= Rattray =

Rattray may refer to:

== People ==
- Rattray (surname)

== Places ==
In Scotland

- Rattray, Aberdeenshire, near Crimond, Aberdeenshire
  - Castle of Rattray
  - RNAS Rattray, Royal Naval Air Station
- Rattray Head, headland in Buchan, Aberdeenshire

"Rattray Briggs", the historical name for the rocks at Rattray Head
"Rattray Bay", to the north of Rattray Head

- Rattray, Perth and Kinross, a settlement in Blairgowrie and Rattray twin burgh

Elsewhere

- Rattray Marsh Conservation Area, Ontario, Canada
- Rattray Park, Kumasi, Ghana
