= Lonmay Castle =

Coordinates: 57°38′16.05″N 1°53′49.14″W

The remains of the Castle of Lonmay are found near Netherton of Lonmay, to the north of Loch Strathbeg in Buchan, Scotland. The remains are not located in the modern village of Lonmay which is approximately 6 km to the south-west. It was described by W. Douglas Simpson as one of the nine castles of the Knuckle, referring to the rocky headland of North-East Aberdeenshire.

== History ==
Dating from the 13th century it was home to the Fraser family.

The castle "may have been a motte". It has long ceased to be in existence and there are very few remains to be found, all of which are buried under constantly shifting sand dunes that have over time engulfed the site.

The castle provided protection to the north shore of the estuary that used to flow into Strathbeg Bay, before it closed off forming Loch Strathbeg around 1720. The south-shore (with Starny Keppie harbour and the village of Rattray) was protected by the Castle of Rattray.

The remains are found "in the Links".. "near the sea" however "all the stones have been carried off, and employed in building farm-houses" and so "except the name, all tradition respecting this building is lost".
