= Castle of Rattray =

Medieval castle in Scotland

Coordinates: 57.61011°N 1.85438°W

- Rattray, Aberdeenshire, Scotland
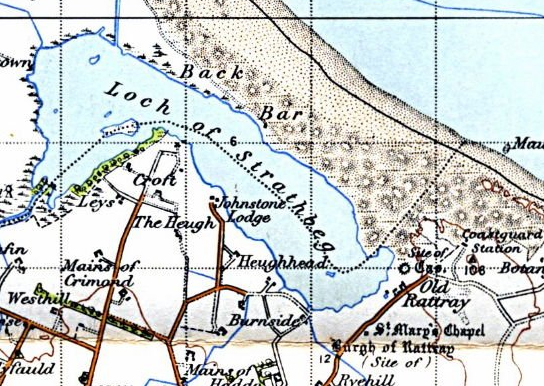
- The castle shown on a 1931 Ordnance Survey map as "Site of Cas" to the south-east of Loch Strathbeg.

Site information
- Owner: Comyn family (early 13th to early 14th centuries)
- Condition: Destroyed, no remains

Location
- Coordinates: NK088578

Site history
- Built: 12th century
- In use: 12th, 13th and early 14th centuries
- Materials: originally timber, then stone
- Demolished: timber structure likely 1308, stone unknown

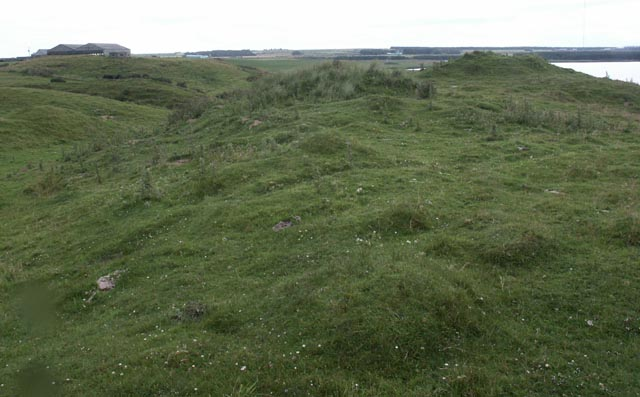
Castle Hill in 2008, all that is left of the original site

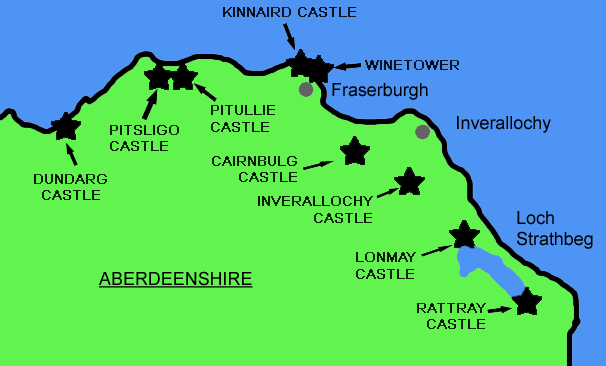
Rattray Castle, one of the nine castles of the Knuckle

The Castle of Rattray was a medieval Scottish castle, with multiple variations on its structure over approximately six centuries. Originally built as a "late 12th- or early 13th century defensive motte" it provided protection for Starny Keppie Harbour and Rattray village. Sometime between 1214 and 1233 it was upgraded by William Comyn, jure uxoris Earl of Buchan before being destroyed in the 1308 Harrying of Buchan. After Comyn's timber castle was burned down, it was replaced by a stronger stone castle which was engulfed during a 1720 sand storm along with nearby Rattray village. After the storm, the castle was not dug out and remains covered to this day. The castle was described by W. Douglas Simpson as one of the nine castles of the Knuckle, referring to the rocky headland of north-east Aberdeenshire.

== Location ==
The castle was sited on Castlehill, on the south bank of the now-closed estuary flowing into Strathbeg Bay – the north bank was protected by the opposite Lonmay Castle. Specifically the castle was "beside an inlet which led from the sea into a sheltered harbour" on "the harbour side" of Rattray village. The later stone castle is known to have had a "harbour-side entrance".

Originally situated on "a rock near the sea", Castlehill is today about 1 mile inland as shifting sands have significantly altered the shape of the coast. Located to the south of Loch Strathbeg it can be seen as a grassy "circular mound" which is "oval & natural with its top slightly dished". A 1791 book states it has a "summit"... [of] "half a Scots acre" (approx. 0.25 hectare) and "rises 38 feet"... (11.6 metres) "above a small plain on the"... north-east "but is only 12 or 14 feet"... (3.7 or 4.3 metres) "above the higher ground" to the south-west.

== History ==
=== 1100 AD to 1200 ===
The first construction of Castlehill was a small keep during the late middle ages, or a 12th century "timber castle or Motte" built to protect the estuary.

=== Comyn period (1200 to 1308) ===
In the 13th century, the Castle of Rattray was "the principal seat of the Cummings"... [alt. spelling of Comyn] "Earls of Buchan" who arrived at the start of that century. Between 1214, when he inherited the Earldom of Buchan, and his own death in 1233, William Comyn, jure uxoris Earl of Buchan built upon the motte but it is unclear whether he upgraded the existing buildings or built an entirely new castle. He is known to have completed a "manor house" with "a fine timber-framed hall" (the castle) which was accompanied by the private St Mary's Chapel which he constructed "a quarter of a mile" (0.4 kilometres) south, in Rattray village itself.

In the mid-1270s, it is reported that "a castle-strengthening programme Rattray" took place.

Comyn's castle survived until the Harrying of Buchan in the summer of 1308, when all the Comyn lands were bloodily burned to the ground after John Comyn, Earl of Buchan was beaten at the Battle of Barra. The timber Rattray Castle was almost certainly attacked by Robert the Bruce or his younger brother Edward after which the "castle fell into ruins" if not burned to the ground.

=== 1308 to ~1720 ===
Following the harrying, the site of Rattray's timber castle was rebuilt with a "stone-built hall". This stone incarnation provided protection for Starnie Keppie Harbour and the village of Rattray, as the previous incarnations did.

The Earldom of Buchan and hence the castle was inherited and divided after the harrying between John Comyn's two nieces. Henry de Beaumont, the husband of one niece; Alice Comyn, claimed the title under her name but was disinherited from the lands in 1314. A 1324 charter from Robert the Bruce then gives the "lordship of Rattray" to Sir Archibald Douglas. The lands again change hands in 1382, when Alexander Stewart was given the Earldom by his father Robert II of Scotland.

Mary, Queen of Scots, declared Rattray a Royal Burgh in 1563 "to put an end to the disputes about superiority over it between William Keith, 4th Earl Marischal and George Hay, 7th Earl of Erroll". The importance of the Burgh is questionable due to the fact "it does not appear to have long enjoyed that privilege not being ranked in the roll of boroughs for many ages" and as it was "said to have had all the privileges of a royal borough, except sending members to parliament."

In later years Rattray was run by a feudal system of superiors who maintained the land for the Crown, some of whom are known due to charters that they granted. "David Rivis"... "superior of the lands of Rattray" granted a charter in 1617; "William Watson of Haddo, bailie of the burgh of Rattray, superior" [of Rattray] granted a charter in 1675 and "Charles".. [Hay, 13th] "Earl of Erroll, superior of the lands of Rattray" granted a charter in 1711.

The destruction of the stone castle and the nearby village of Rattray, is said by "a tradition" to have happened during the great storm of 1720 which cut off Strathbeg Bay. It is believed that the castle was "blown over with sand one Sunday evening while the" inhabitants, "a godless crew". "were engaged in playing cards". "on the Sabbath, [when] they were buried alive."

Another story says that the site was "buried because of the plague." However, there is no date or record of which plague and it is a very unlikely account.

=== ~1720 to 1988 ===
Today there is not much to be seen at the site as the remains have "for a long period [been] covered with a deep soil, and now – the swords of the warlike house beaten literally into ploughshares". In c. 1730, a dig at the south-east "side of the Castle Hill"... "found a great number of stones, supposed to belong to the kitchen of the castle, as"... "workmen found very large hearthstones covered with ashes."

Items recovered include; "a quantity of regularly-laid stones were removed c. 1734 and some silver coins" as well as two kilns stands found in 1829 (today held in Marischal Museum, Aberdeen).

In 1740, "a man who drove his spade through the panel of a door was immediately suffocated" having got caught in the sand and at an unknown date, a "well-made causeway was discovered at the foot of the mound under which the Castle is said to be buried."

=== 1985–1989 Excavations ===
Thorough excavations at Castlehill in 1985–1989 revealed the remains of the stone castle and traces of the previous timber one. Traces of the stone castle revealed a "perimeter wall".. and "two mural buildings". It also ascertained that the later stone castle was approximately "20m by 6.5 m" and "divided into three parts, a central room, and two smaller end rooms". It likely supported more than one storey, due to the "indication of a possible forestair"... and "the wall thickness."

The results of this excavation can be found in the Journal article (available free from the link in the journal citation below) "Excavations at Rattray, Aberdeenshire. A Scottish deserted burgh" by "Murray & Murray" and forms the most complete modern and peer-reviewed academic account of the Castle of Rattray available to historians and archaeologists today.

=== 1989 to present ===
Aberdeen City Council today holds various artefacts from Rattray and the Castlehill site and has previously held a temporary display of artefacts at James Dun's House in Aberdeen.
