= John Comyn, Earl of Buchan =

Scottish nobleman (c. 1260–1308)

John Comyn, 3rd Earl Buchan
- Coat of arms as Earl of Buchan

Personal details
- Born: Buchan, Aberdeenshire
- Died: 1308 England
- Spouse: Isabella MacDuff
- Parent(s): Alexander Comyn, Earl of Buchan; Elizabeth de Quincy

John Comyn, 3rd Earl of Buchan (circa 1260 – 1308) was a chief opponent of Robert the Bruce in the civil war that paralleled the War of Scottish Independence. He should not be confused with the better known John III Comyn, Lord of Badenoch, who was his cousin, and who was killed by Bruce in Dumfries in March 1306. Confusion between the two men has affected the study of this period of history.

Buchan was the representative of a family that had long dominated the politics of Scotland. He was defeated by Bruce at the Battle of Barra and was subsequently forced to flee to England. Bruce's Harrying of Buchan destroyed support for the Comyns in northern Scotland. This defeat, together with Comyn's death that year, produced a significant and lasting shift in the balance of power in Scotland.

== Comyns of Buchan ==
The Comyns, a family of Norman origin, first made their appearance in Scotland during the reign of David I. In 1136 William Comyn, who had formerly been in the service of Henry I of England, became Chancellor of Scotland. William Comyn was part of a new class of French-speaking foreigners whose power and status in Scotland was entirely dependent on their service to the king. They were to be used by David and his successors in extending royal authority to the semi-independent fringes of the kingdom. The Comyns first grants of land were in the south of Scotland. In 1212 they made their most significant advance when William Comyn, Justiciar of Scotia, married Marjory, the only child and heir of Fergus, the "earl" or mormaer of Buchan. The lordship encompassed a large area in the north-east of Scotland. When their son Alexander succeeded them, the Comyns became the first family of Norman origin to acquire comital status in Scotland. This allowed Comyns to gain a head start on the Bruces, also of Norman-French origin, who did not acquire the earldom of Carrick until the later thirteenth century. William also advanced Comyn power by acquiring for his son, Walter Comyn, the southern section of the old earldom of Moray, the Lordship of Badenoch, which also included the more westerly district of Lochaber. By the middle of the thirteenth century Comyn leadership thus extended from the shores of Aberdeenshire westwards all the way to Loch Linnhe. The family remained in power through the successive reigns of Alexander II and Alexander III; but they might be said to have reached the heights of their power and influence during the reign of John Balliol.

== Competitors and kings ==
In 1290 Margaret, Maid of Norway, the last direct descendant of the Canmore dynasty, died, leaving the Scottish throne with no clear successor. Thirteen competitors came forward, including Robert Bruce of Annandale, grandfather of the future king, and John Balliol. Although John Comyn, Lord of Badenoch, sometimes known as the Black Comyn, was one of the minor competitors, the weight of the family was behind the claim of Balliol, Badenoch's brother-in-law. Following the intervention of Edward I, Balliol finally emerged in 1292 as the strongest claimant in terms of feudal law, though the Bruce family was not reconciled to this outcome. Any successful future bid for the crown could only proceed with the co-operation, or by the destruction, of the house of Comyn. By 1292 the great division which was to dominate Scottish politics on and off for over fifty years had taken definite shape.

== John of Buchan ==
John Comyn became third earl of Buchan following the death of his father, Alexander, in 1289. Comyn was some 30 years of age at the time. He was prominent in John Balliol's administration, emerging as Constable of Scotland by 1293. He was one of those summoned by Edward I, in his capacity as the Feudal overlord of Scotland, to serve in the wars in France. When King John agreed to the demands of the English king for Scottish participation in the war, Buchan and others, took management of the kingdom into their own hands. The new government concluded an alliance with France and prepared for war with England. In the first act of that war Buchan, along with his cousin, John, the Red Comyn, son of the Black Comyn and nephew of King John, led an attack on Carlisle. This attack was against Robert Bruce, Earl of Carrick, son of the competitor. Thus it might be said that what was to become the War of Scottish Independence opened with a clash between the Comyns and the Bruces.

The attack on Carlisle was a failure; so too was the whole Scottish campaign of 1296. Edward, having knocked out the main Scottish host at the Battle of Dunbar, moved North in rapid stages. Buchan and King John surrendered at Montrose in July, along with other leading Scottish nobles. John of Buchan was stripped of the symbols of power and taken south to the Tower of London. Buchan was imprisoned in England south of the River Trent. In June 1297, he promised to serve in the army against France. That same year Scotland was engulfed in a widespread rebellion, led by Sir Andrew Moray in the North and Sir William Wallace in the South of the country. Moray's rising was of particular interest to Buchan, because it touched on the borders of his own estates. It was with the intention of bringing Moray under control, that Edward finally sent Buchan back to his home in July, 1297.

== War of the Comyns ==
For Buchan, the task of bringing Moray under control would demand diplomatic skill, involving national politics and family loyalties. Moray was known to him, as the son of his close neighbor Sir Andrew Moray of Petty and Avoch. Andrew Moray, at the time, was still in prison in England. Long political allies, there was also a family association between the Morays and the Comyns. Sir Andrew had taken as his second wife Euphemia Comyn, the daughter of the first Lord of Badenoch. To do nothing, or even to join the rebels, involved risks for Comyn, because the Red Comyn was with Edward in Flanders. In the end the two sides met up on the banks of the Spey. Afterward, Moray retired into a "great stronghold of bog and wood" where he could not be followed, as Buchan later offered Edward by way of excuse. Hugh de Cressingham, the chief agent of the English occupation, expressed his opinion that this was a thinly disguised double-act, writing that "the peace on the other side of the Scottish sea (Firth of Forth) is still in obscurity, as it is said, as to the doings of the earls who are there." The Guisborough Chronicle had little doubt of Comyn's culpability, who "at first pretended to repress rebellion but in the end changed sides and became a thorn in our flesh." However, later that year, shortly before the Battle of Stirling Bridge, Buchan was still believed to be loyal by the English government. The reality is that Wallace and Moray could scarcely have met up, or even recruited sufficient forces in the north, without the tacit approval of Buchan and his associates.

== The noble and the guardian ==
Buchan can be said to have made at least some indirect contribution to the victory at Stirling, though he was not personally present at the battle. Afterwards his career goes through a period of particular obscurity, few details having survived. It seems certain, though, that the death of Moray, either during or shortly after the battle, and the political ascendancy of William Wallace, who emerged as Guardian of Scotland by early 1298, had an effect on his general attitude towards the rising. Few if any of the major players at this time were either the selfless patriots or the dark villains depicted by later history. Personal advantage and self-interest were always significant factors. For Buchan, and many of his fellow nobles, Wallace was less of the great hero and more of the political parvenu, who by the normal order of things would have been a figure of little importance in a conservative feudal society. It would therefore have been particularly galling for Buchan to see the vacant bishopric of St Andrews filled, at Wallace's behest, by William Lamberton in place of the man he had expected to take the position, Master William Comyn, his own brother. Both John Fordun and John Barbour said in their chronicles, although their neutrality could be questioned, that the Comyns abandoned Wallace at the Battle of Falkirk. Their interpretation of events involves some intellectual acrobatics: Fordun condemns the Comyns for losing the battle for Wallace, while in the next breath he commends Robert Bruce, the future king, for winning it for the English. Yet, setting this interpretation of events aside, the evidence suggests Comyn hostility towards Wallace, magnified, perhaps, by Lamberton's known association with the Bruce family.

Shortly after the defeat at Falkirk, Wallace resigned as Guardian. He was replaced by Robert Bruce the younger, who had now joined the patriots, and John Comyn of Badenoch, who had returned to Scotland. This uneasy match was obviously intended to balance the competing interests in Scotland; for though Bruce acted with the Red Comyn in the name of "the illustrious King John", his claim to the throne was openly known. In 1299, the whole delicate structure threatened to fall apart at a meeting of the baronial council at Peebles, a potentially murderous episode reported by an English spy. David Graham, an adherent of the Comyns, made a surprise intervention;

At the council Sir David Graham demanded the lands and goods of Sir William Wallace because he was leaving the kingdom without the leave or approval of the Guardians. And Sir Malcolm Wallace, Sir William's brother, answered that neither his lands nor his goods should be given away, for they were protected by the peace in which Wallace left the kingdom. At this the two knights gave the lie to each other and drew their daggers. And since Sir David was of Sir John Comyn's following and Sir Malcolm Wallace of the Earl of Carrick's following, it was reported to the Earl of Buchan and John Comyn that a fight had broken out without their knowing it; and John Comyn leaped at the Earl of Carrick and seized him by the throat, and the Earl of Buchan turned on the Bishop of St. Andrews, declaring that treason and lesemajestie were being plotted. Eventually the Stewart and others came between them and quitened them.

Lamberton was added to the panel of Guardians with the intention of keeping the peace, an odd arrangement considering the Comyns' hostility towards him. In the end he had to step down when The Red Comyn declared that he no longer wished to serve with him. Bruce himself stepped down in 1300, at a time when the restoration of King John looked like a serious possibility, the chief political aim of the whole Comyn family.

== The Comyns in power ==
From about 1300 to 1304 the war of Scotland was also, in a sense, the war of the Comyns. With his cousin as Guardian, Buchan was occupied as Justiciar North of the Forth, holding court at Aberdeen in early 1300. He was also active on the border, taking part in raids against the English and in Galloway, where, as sheriff of Wigtown, he attempted to win over the local people to the national cause. In 1301 he joined with John de Soules in campaigning against the English army in the valley of the River Clyde. The following year he was chosen to take part in an embassy to Paris to try to prevent a peace treaty between England and France. In his absence his cousin helped beat an English force at the Battle of Roslin, but this was a false dawn, overtaken by ensuing darkness. Edward, preparing for a major offensive against Scotland, persuaded Philip IV to exclude her from the Treaty of Paris, signed in May 1303. Buchan joined with the other ambassadors in writing words of encouragement to his cousin:

For God's sake do not despair...it would gladen your hearts if you would know how much your honour has increased in every part of the world as a result of your recent battle with the English. If you have done brave deeds, do braver ones now. The swiftest runner who falls before the winning post has run in vain.

In the end Edward's invasion in 1303, by far the strongest since 1296, proved too strong to resist. As the English army punched north of the Forth, the first time it had done so since 1296, threatening the Comyn estates in Buchan and Badenoch, the Guardian took the pragmatic step, entering into peace negotiations with King Edward, concluded at Strathord near Perth in February 1304. Paradoxically the Comyns did not fare too badly, still figuring in the government of Scotland even after the conquest. Edward I, despite his fierce reputation, and his implacable hatred for men like Wallace, was by political and economic necessity forced to compromise. In Scotland he could not afford the ruinous cost in men, money and materials that it had taken to secure his earlier conquest of Wales, so time and again he was forced to enter into bonds and alliances with his former enemies. Buchan's lands confiscated at one minute were returned at the next, and he was made a member of the council of regency under the new English governor, John of Brittany, Earl of Richmond; and in September 1305 he was one of the commissioners who attended the union Parliament at Westminster to accept Edward's Ordinances for the government of Scotland.

== Murder and blood feud ==
By 1306 it was plain to all that John Balliol, now in retirement on his French estates, would never return to Scotland. His kingship was dead but the Balliol claim was not. It was best represented by Edward Balliol, the former king's son, but he was still in English captivity and would be for some time to come. The next best candidate was the Red Comyn, King John's nephew. His greatest competitor was, of course, Robert Bruce, who had submitted to the English as long ago as 1302, but had never fully abandoned his own royal ambitions. Since 1286 the threat of civil war between the houses of Bruce and Balliol had haunted and shaped Scottish politics. On 10 February 1306 Bruce and his associates murdered Comyn and his uncle in Dumfries; the threat now became a reality.

We will never know for certain the reasons behind the killing of the Red Comyn: for the Scottish sources it was the justified fate of a traitor and a spy; for the English it was a bloody and premeditated crime. The one thing they both agree on is that the Comyn family in general, and the Red Comyn in particular, was a major obstacle on the path of Bruce's ambition. The killing of 1306 was thus rewriting the judgement of 1292. Seizing the political high ground, Bruce was crowned at Scone on 25 March in an improvised ceremony. The Stone of Scone was missing; so too was the Earl of Fife, who by custom placed all new kings on the throne as the foremost of the Scottish earls. In a surprise move Isabella MacDuff, his sister, who also happened to be Buchan's wife, arrived bringing her husband's war horses and claimed the right for herself. Accordingly, another ceremony was held two days after the first. We have no insight into the precise reasons why she took a different view of matters from her husband. Buchan, as far as we know, took no action to save Isabella from the fate that her actions were shortly to bring upon her, though as Edward's chief Scottish adherent his views on the matter would certainly have carried some weight. Some sources say that he wanted her executed.

With Bruce having gone one way it was inevitable that Buchan and his associates would go the other: men, in other words, whose patriotic credentials had hitherto been impressive were now guaranteed to fight on the side of the English. Setting aside Bruce's obvious skills as a soldier and a political strategist, this was the key to the ultimate failure of the Comyns: people who took no position on the murder in Dumfries would identify themselves with a new and successful King of Scots against a party invariably ranged on the side of the national enemy.

== War and terror ==
At the outset, the combination of forces ranged against Bruce were formidable but widely scattered. He was to deal with them piece by piece, a task made all the easier by the death of Edward I in July 1307 and the accession of the far less capable Edward II. With the main English army absent from the scene Bruce dealt with his enemies in Scotland with ruthless determination. Following successful campaigns in Galloway and Argyll he concentrated all his efforts and resources against the earl of Buchan, his principal domestic enemy.

The campaign against Comyn was to last from late 1307 right through to the spring of 1308, prolonged after the king was overtaken by a bout of serious illness. This was, perhaps, the best opportunity for Comyn to destroy his enemy. With Bruce incapacitated, and the royal army reduced in numbers, an attack was mounted against his camp at Slioch near Huntly; but it was pressed with no great determination, and Buchan withdrew after some desultory arrow fire. Unfortunately the only sources we have for the whole campaign in the north-east are uniformly hostile to Comyn. There are two possibilities here: either Buchan's talents as a soldier were limited, or he could not fully rely on the forces at his disposal. The evidence suggests a combination of both factors. The campaign concluded in December 1307 or May 1308, depending on which source is correct, when Buchan's army collapsed at the Battle of Inverurie. Eventually, Buchan fled to England after his earldom was subjected to systematic devastation.

The Harrying of Buchan was carried out with the aim in mind: to destroy forever Comyn power in north-east Scotland. The devastation was carried out not by the English but by Scots against their fellow Scots, so thorough and effective that it was remembered for some fifty years after the event. As a piece of political terrorism it was supremely effective. A similar herschip in Galloway did not destroy the loyalties of the local people for the Balliol family, which were to resurface in the 1330s. But the earldom of Buchan would never again rise for the Comyns.

In England the fugitive earl was well received by King Edward, who appointed him warden of the west marches in June 1308; but he was not to enjoy his new responsibilities for long, dying sometime before December. Alice Comyn, his niece and heir, married Henry Beaumont, a French nobleman in the English service. Beaumont was to claim the earldom of Buchan in right of his wife, a claim pursued with such relentless determination that it was a major factor in bringing about the Second War of Scottish Independence in the 1330s and beginning anew the war between the Comyns and the Bruces.

== See also ==
- Earl of Buchan

Peerage of Scotland
Preceded by Alexander Comyn	Earl of Buchan; 1289–1308	Succeeded by Forfeit, next held by Alexander Stewart
Legal offices
Preceded by Uncertain, last known was Andreas de Moravia	Justiciar of Scotia c. 1300–1305	Succeeded by Reginald Cheyne, John de Vaux, Robert Keith and William Inge
