= Brechin (disambiguation) =

Brechin is a town in Angus, Scotland, UK.

Brechin may also refer to:

- Brechin, Brechin Beach and Brechin Point, three communities in Ramara, Ontario, Canada
- Brechin (Parliament of Scotland constituency), a former burgh constituency
- Brechin City F.C., a Scottish Association Football Club who play in the Scottish Professional Football League
- Diocese of Brechin, a historic diocese in Scotland
- Diocese of Brechin (Episcopal), an active diocese of the Scottish Episcopal Church

== People with the surname ==
- Gray Brechin, geographer, architectural historian and writer
- Sir David de Brechin, Scottish knight.

== See also ==
- Brecheen, a surname
