= Jardine Comyn =

Lord of Inveralloch

Jardine Comyn Lord of Inverallochy
- Children: Philip Comyn
- Parent(s): William Comyn, Lord of Badenoch; Sarah Fitzhugh

Jardine Comyn, Lord of Inverallochy, also known as Jordan, was a son of William Comyn, Lord of Badenoch later the Earl of Buchan and was granted the lands of Inverallochy from his father upon William becoming the Earl of Buchan, jure uxoris of his second wife Margaret, Countess of Buchan.

== Life ==
Jardine was a son of William Comyn, Lord of Badenoch and his first wife Sarah Fitzhugh. He received Inverallochy in Buchan from his father William Comyn, Earl of Buchan jure uxoris in 1225, confirmed in a charter in 1277, by his half brother Alexander Comyn, Earl of Buchan.

== Marriage and issue ==
Jardine, is known to have had the following issue:

- Philip, married Marjory, the daughter of Adam Wauchope of Culter.
