= Sir David de Brechin =

Scottish knight

Coat of arms of the Lord of Brechin

Sir David de Brechin (died 1320) was a Scottish knight who fought on both sides during the Wars of Scottish Independence.

== Life ==
He was the son of Sir William de Brechin by Elena Comyn, daughter of Alexander Comyn, Earl of Buchan and Elizabeth de Quincy. Sir William was the son of Henry of Brechin, an illegitimate son of David of Scotland, Earl of Huntingdon. Brechin is first attested to as a ward of a Sir John de Callendar in 1292.

Brechin fought in the Earl of Surrey's army at the Battle of Dunbar, and was granted lands previously owned by Alan Durward.

He name appears twice on the 1296 Ragman Rolls for Forfarshire.

In the train of Robert the Bruce, he was present at Peebles when the Bruce, John Comyn, and William Lamberton were sworn in as Guardians of Scotland. Brechin returned to Galloway with Bruce.

By 1301, Sir David was still active in southwestern Scotland. On 8 September Brechin was in a force led by Sir John de Soulis and Sir Ingram de Umfraville, that attacked Lochmaben Castle, and was wounded in the fight.

Brechin returned to English service when he did homage to Edward I of England at the Siege of Stirling Castle.

Continuing in English service, Brechin was present at the Battle of Inverurie, and according to John Barbour, he retired after the battle to Brechin Castle where he was besieged by David Earl of Atholl. However this is contested by the historian and genealogist Sir James Balfour Paul. According to all records, Strathbogie was still in the service of the English, so the capture of Brechin Castle must have been accomplished by another of King Robert's following.

On 6 April 1320, Brechin appended his seal to the Declaration of Arbroath.

At a parliament at Scone (later known as the Black Parliament) in August that year, Brechin was found complicit along with William de Soules, the Countess of Strathearn and others in a conspiracy to depose the king. For this offence Brechin was executed.

Although there is no reason to doubt his guilt, his execution surprised many people, as he was seen as a "flower of chivalry", having acquitted himself well in battle against the Saracens during the crusades.

== Marriages and issue ==
Brechin appears to have married Margaret de Bonkyll, widow of Sir John Stewart of Bonkyll, by 1304 when she is recorded as his wife. and had issue.

- Margaret de Brechin, married in 1315 to Sir David de Barclay

David de Brechin appears to have married secondly a Margaret Ramsay.
