= Hostarius =

Medieval Scottish title

The Hostarius (alternatively, Usher, Doorward or Durward) was an office in medieval Scotland. Its holders who eventually became hereditary, had the theoretical responsibility of guarding the king's door, thereby protecting the king's property. This is a list of hostarii.

- Malcolm de Molle, uncle of Alan fitz Walter, 2nd High Steward of Scotland
- Jocelin, reign of William the Lion
- Thomas de Lundin (son of Máel Coluim son of Gille Críst, Earl of Mar), d. 1231
- Alan Durward (son of Thomas), d. 1275

The family of "Durward" (a later name for hostarius) may have held the office hereditarily after Thomas of Lundie, and certainly kept the title as a surname (in Norman French, l'Ussier ("the Usher"); in English, Durward). However, by the second half of the 13th century, the office was no longer hereditary. This led to many individuals serve as hostarii during this period. Unlike many other hereditary royal office holders, the "Durward" family were not of Anglo-Norman or French origin but native Gaelic origin. It was a sept of the native comital dynasty of Mar. The Mar's serve as the Lord High Constables of Scotland and command a guard known as the Doorward Guard of Partizans, the oldest still extant bodyguard in Britain.

== See also ==
- Clann-an-oistir
- Ostiarius
