= John de Keith =

13th-century Scottish noble

Sir John de Keith, Marischal of Scotland (died c. 1270), was a Scottish noble. He was a son of Hervey de Keith (died 1249) and Margaret de Douglas.

John inherited the position of Marischal of Scotland in 1249, which was charged with the safety of the king's person within Parliament and was also custodian of the royal regalia.

== Marriage and issue ==
John married Margaret Comyn, daughter of William Comyn, Lord of Badenoch, Justiciar of Scotland and Marjory, Countess of Buchan, they are known to have had the following issue:

- William de Keith (died c. 1290), married Barbara de Seton, had issue.
- Robert de Keith (died 1343), married Joanna Galbraith, had issue.
- Edward de Keith
- Richard de Keith
- Philip de Keith, Rector of Biggar.
