= Uilleam, Earl of Mar =

13th-century Scottish nobleman

William of Mar, also known by the name Uilleam mac Dhonnchaidh (Anglicised as "William, Duncan's son"), was the mormaer of Mar in medieval Scotland from 1244 to 1276. His father was Donnchadh of Mar.

Uilleam was responsible for the construction of Kildrummy Castle, the greatest castle to have been built in 13th-century northern Scotland. It is one of the few examples where a native Scottish magnate built a large-scale fortification, something normally practiced by the incoming Normans.

Uilleam, more than any of his predecessors, participated in Scottish and even British-wide politics, becoming a leading figure in the royal regime of Alexander II, and the minority of Alexander III. By 1244, Uilleam had married into the Comyn house, the fastest-rising Scoto-Norman family in the Scottish kingdom. He married Elisabeth Comyn, the daughter of William Comyn, jure uxoris Earl of Buchan and Marjory, Countess of Buchan. The Comyn–Mar alliance helped fight off the ambitions of the Durwards, who were then in prime favour with the king.

Alan Durward used his descent from a daughter of Gille Críst to contest Uilleam's right to the mormaerdom, but Uilleam successfully held off these claims. Uilleam and the Comyn Earl of Menteith then launched accusations of treason towards Alan while at the court of Henry III of England at York.

Uilleam engaged in supplementing his power on a nationwide basis. He held the post of Sheriff of Dumbarton between 1264 and 1266, a post which opened up connections in the western Highlands. Uilleam was able to marry his younger son Donnchadh to Cairistíona Nic Ruaidhrí, daughter of the Hebridean chief Ailéan mac Ruaidhrí, a man who had been one of the principal supporters of the Norwegian cause against the Scottish Crown in the 1260s.

When his wife Isabel (also called Elizabeth) died in 1267, Uilleam married Muriel, the daughter of Maol Íosa II, Mormaer of Strathearn. Uilleam died in 1276, and was succeeded by his son Domhnall.

== Bibliography ==
- Oram, Richard D., "The Earls and Earldom of Mar, c1150-1300," Steve Boardman and Alasdair Ross (eds.) The Exercise of Power in Medieval Scotland, c.1200-1500, (Dublin/Portland, 2003).

Preceded by Donnchadh	Mormaer of Mar; 1244–1276	Succeeded by Domhnall
