= Harrying of Buchan =

Military raids in Scotland

- Part of First War of Scottish Independence
Date	May – late 1308
Location	Buchan, Scotland
Result	Scottish Royal Victory

Belligerents
Scottish Royal Army	Scottish Rebels

Commanders and leaders
Edward Bruce, Earl of Carrick; Robert the Bruce	John Comyn, Earl of Buchan

Strength
Unknown	Unknown

Casualties and losses
Unknown	Heavy; John Comyn, Earl of Buchan fled

The Harrying of Buchan, also known as the Herschip (hardship) or Rape of Buchan, took place in 1308 during the Wars of Scottish Independence. It saw vast areas of Buchan in northeast Scotland, then ruled by Clan Comyn, burned to the ground by Robert the Bruce and his brother Edward, immediately following their success at the Battle of Barra.

== Bruce's campaign ==
After his victory at the Battle of Barra in May 1308, King Robert the Bruce's men chased the forces of John Comyn, Earl of Buchan as far as Fyvie Castle. As this was a strong fortress, the pursuit ended there. King Robert then commanded his only living brother, Edward de Bruce to lay waste to the Earldom of Buchan, from end to end, including all the castles and strongholds, principally Slains Castle, Rattray Castle and Dundarg Castle as well as the castles that were in English hands such as Fyvie Castle and Aberdeen Castle. At some point after his defeat at Barra, John Comyn fled Scotland for England.

Edward de Bruce proceeded for several months to harry Buchan and to kill those who resisted King Robert's rule, homesteads destroyed, livestock slaughtered, stores of grain destroyed, and reducing the castles. By destroying the Comyn's power base, King Robert prevented any possible chance of future violent hostility towards his rule. There is no trustworthy account of the Harrying of Buchan, but it was undoubtedly a prolonged and fiercely contested campaign. After the completion of the Harrying of Buchan, in June 1308 King Robert turned his attention to Aberdeen Castle to which he laid siege and destroyed.

== Aftermath ==
The Comyns had ruled Buchan for nearly a century, from 1214, when William Comyn inherited the title from his wife. Such was the destruction that the people of Buchan lost all loyalties to the Comyns and never again rose against King Robert's supporters. It took thirty years before John Comyn's successor to the Earldom, Henry Beaumont, made an appearance in the area. Between 1333 and 1334, he repaired Dundarg Castle which King Robert had destroyed during the harrying, only for it to be laid siege to and destroyed by Sir Andrew Murray of Bothwell in December 1336. Finding little support, he left after the siege to England where he died in 1340. His son John refused the earldom, ending the Comyn lineage and the first creation, Mormaers of Buchan.
