= Desert wheatear =

- Adult male Oenanthe deserti – Tal Chhapar Sanctuary, Rajasthan, India
- Female, same location

Conservation status
- Least Concern (IUCN 3.1)

Scientific classification
- Kingdom: Animalia
- Phylum: Chordata
- Class: Aves
- Order: Passeriformes
- Family: Muscicapidae
- Genus: Oenanthe
- Species: O. deserti

Binomial name
- Oenanthe deserti (Temminck, 1825)
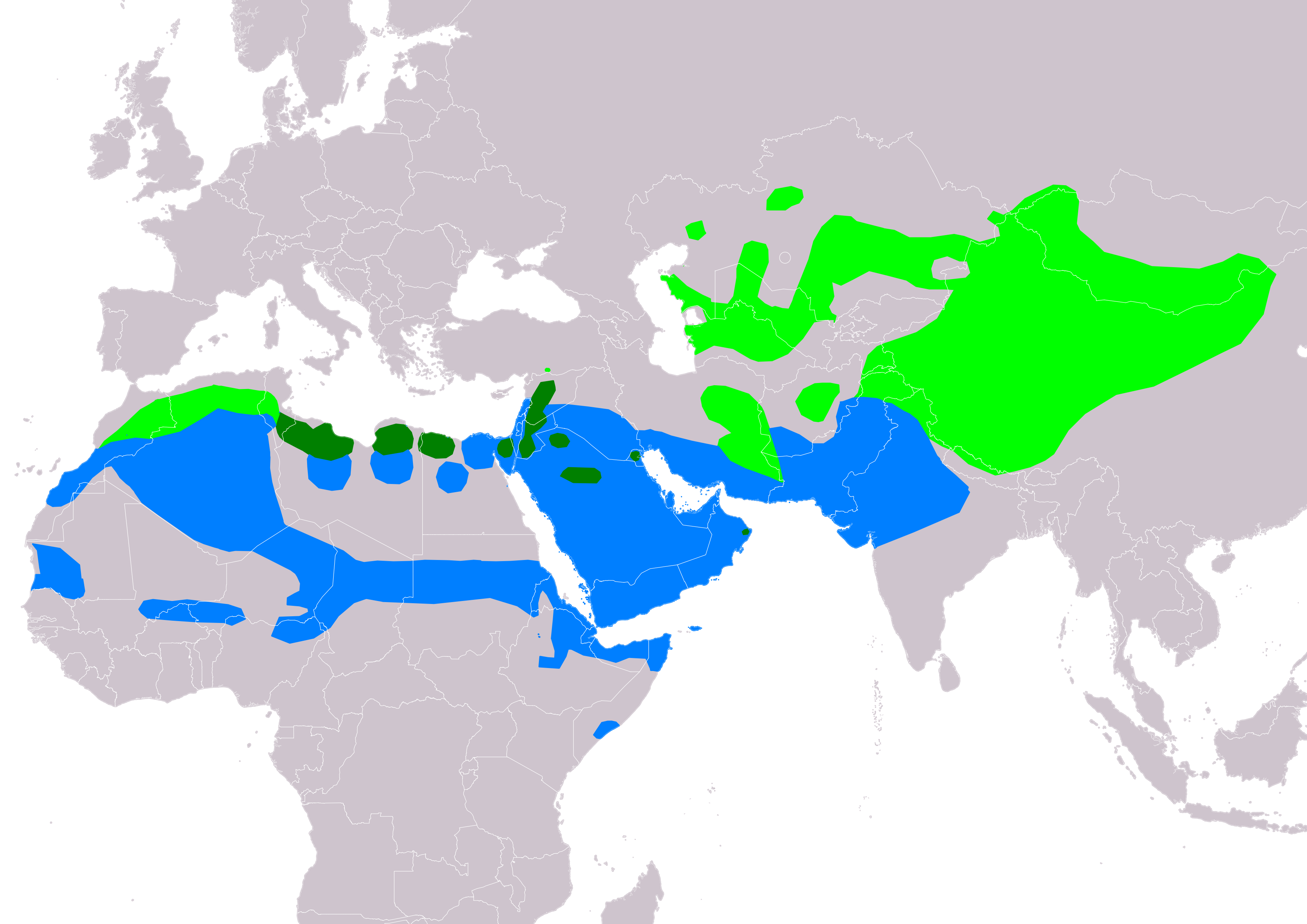
- Range of O. deserti Breeding Resident Non-breeding

Species of bird

The desert wheatear (Oenanthe deserti) is a wheatear, a small passerine bird that was formerly classed as a member of the thrush family Turdidae, but is now more generally considered to be an Old World flycatcher (Muscicapidae). It is a migratory insectivorous species, 14.5 to 15 cm (5.7 to 5.9 in) in length. Both western and eastern forms of the desert wheatear are rare vagrants to western Europe. The western desert wheatear breeds in the Sahara and the northern Arabian Peninsula. The eastern race is found in the semi-deserts of Central Asia and in winter in Pakistan and northeast Africa.

The plumage of the upper parts of the male in summer is buff. The underparts are white with a buff tinge on the breast. The black on the face and throat extends to the shoulders, and there is distinct white superciliary stripe. The female is greyer above and buffer below and has no black on the throat, and in the winter plumage the black on the throat of the male is partially obscured by the white tips of the feathers. A distinguishing characteristic, in both sexes of all ages, is that the entire tail is black to the level of the upper tail-coverts.

The desert wheatear feeds largely on insects which it picks up off the ground. It breeds in the spring when a clutch of usually four pale blue, slightly speckled eggs is laid in a well-concealed nest made of grasses, mosses and stems.

== Taxonomy and etymology ==
The genus name Oenanthe is derived from the Ancient Greek oenos (οίνος) "wine" and anthos (ανθός) "flower". It refers to the northern wheatear's return to Greece in the spring just as the grapevines blossom. The specific deserti is Latin for "desert". "Wheatear" is not derived from "wheat" or any sense of "ear", but is a 16th-century linguistic corruption of "white" and "arse", referring to the prominent white rump found in many species.

Four subspecies are recognised; Oenanthe deserti deserti is found in the Levant; Oenanthe deserti atrogularis is found in Transcaucasia, Iran, Afghanistan and Mongolia; Oenanthe deserti homochroa is found from Western Sahara to the west part of Egypt; Oenanthe deserti oreophila is found in West China, Kashmir, Tibet, and Pakistan and north eastern Africa.

== Description ==
The head and nape of the adult male desert wheatear are a pale sandy-grey colour with the feathers tipped grey. The mantle, scapulars and back are a similar but rather richer colour. The rump and upper tail-coverts are pale buff. The basal third of the tail feathers are white and the rest black with a pale buff tip. A curved stripe over the eye is pale buff and extends backwards. The feathers of the chin, throat, lores and ear-coverts are black tipped with white. The breast and flanks are sandy-buff and the belly and under tail-coverts are creamy-white tinged with buff. The axillaries and under wing-coverts are black tipped with white. The primaries have black outer webs, tipped and edged with white and inner webs pale brown edged with white. The secondaries are similar but have broader white edges to both webs. Its length is about 15 centimetres (5.9 in) and it weighs between 15 and 34 grams (0.53 and 1.20 oz).

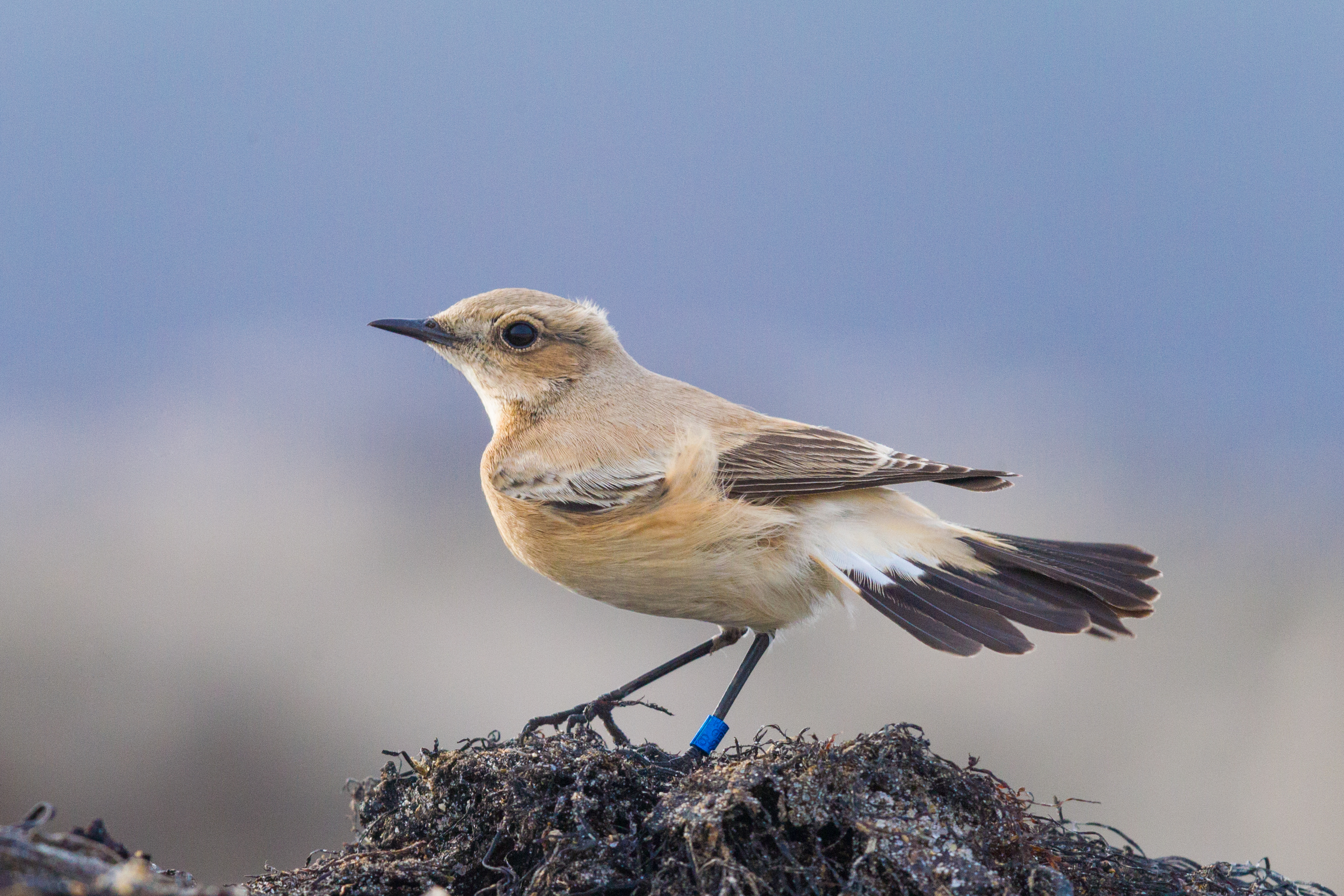
Female desert wheatear

The female has similar plumage but the rump and upper tail-coverts are more sandy brown, the lores, chin and throat pale buff and the dark parts of the tail brownish-black. The juvenile is similar to the adult female but the feathers on the upper parts of the body have pale centres and brown tips which gives the bird a more speckled appearance. There is a single annual moult in late summer and by the following spring the feathers have become rather abraded, with the white tips tending to be worn away, leaving the bird with rather richer colouring. The beak, legs and feet are black and the irises of the eyes dark brown.

== Distribution and habitat ==
The eastern race of the desert wheatear breeds in a great swathe of Asia extending from the Middle East and Saudi Arabia through Iran, Baluchistan, Afghanistan, the south Caucasus, Turkestan, the Tarbagatai Mountains, the Altai Mountains and north western Mongolia. Birds from this region migrate southwards to overwinter in northeastern Africa, the Arabian peninsula, Iraq and Pakistan. The western race breeds in North Africa from Morocco and Rio de Oro to the part of Egypt west of the River Nile. This population is largely resident but in Morocco, birds in the south and east part migrate while those in the south west tend not to.

The habitat of the desert wheatear is barren open countryside, steppes, deserts, semi-arid plains, saltpans, dried up river beds and sandy, stony and rocky wasteland. It is found at altitudes of up to 3,500 metres (11,500 ft). During the winter it may also visit cultivated land when this is interspersed with bare areas of countryside.

The desert wheatear is an occasional vagrant to the United Kingdom, and a female got blown off course in October 2012 during its autumn migration and was seen in a sandpit in Essex. Only a few weeks later, another was seen in the RSPB Loch of Strathbeg reserve in Scotland.

== Behaviour ==
The desert wheatear tends to perch on a bush, tussock or grass or other eminence and dart to the ground beneath to pounce on insects and other small invertebrates, though it can also catch insects in the air. The diet usually consists of ants, beetles, caterpillars and flies and the larvae of various insects including ant-lions. In addition to these, seeds have also been found in its stomach. It is able to hover for short periods and when it finds a large prey insect, with which it is unable to cope, it sometimes displays in front of it by fluttering its wings.

The desert wheatear breeds during late April or May over most of its range. It nests on rocky hillsides, on steppes, on sandy plains, in crevices in walls or in hollows under rocks. The nest is often concealed behind gorse (Ulex europaeus) bushes or other bushy vegetation and is a tidily-built cup made of grasses, mosses and stems, lined with fine roots and hairs, and sometimes small feathers. A clutch of four (occasionally five) eggs are laid. These are pale bluish with fine rusty speckles, usually forming a distinct zone at the wider end. They measure approximately 20.1 by 15 millimetres (0.79 in × 0.59 in). Incubation is done mainly by the female and both sexes help care for the young.

== Status ==
The desert wheatear has a very large range breeding range, estimated as nearly 10 million square kilometers (3.9 million square miles), and the population appears to be stable. For this reason, the bird is listed as being of least concern on the IUCN Red List of Threatened Species.

== Gallery ==
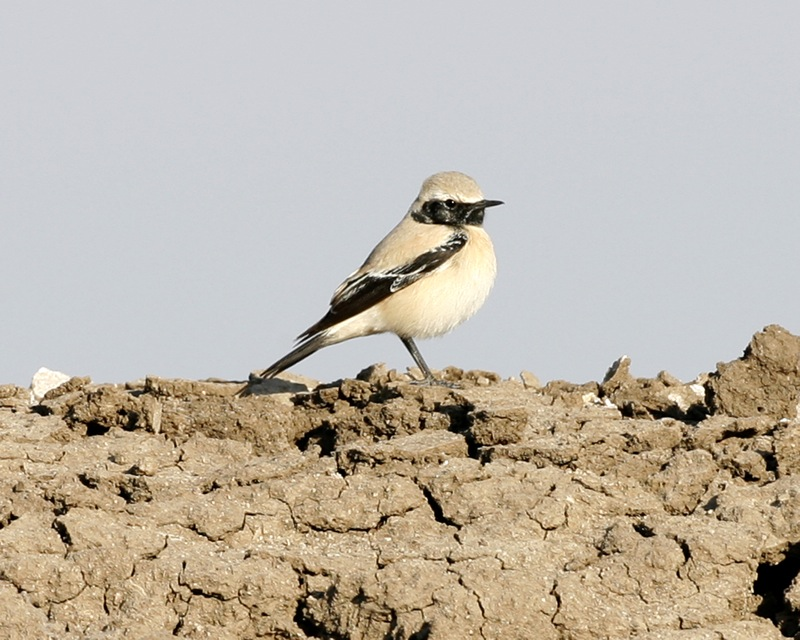
Male in winter

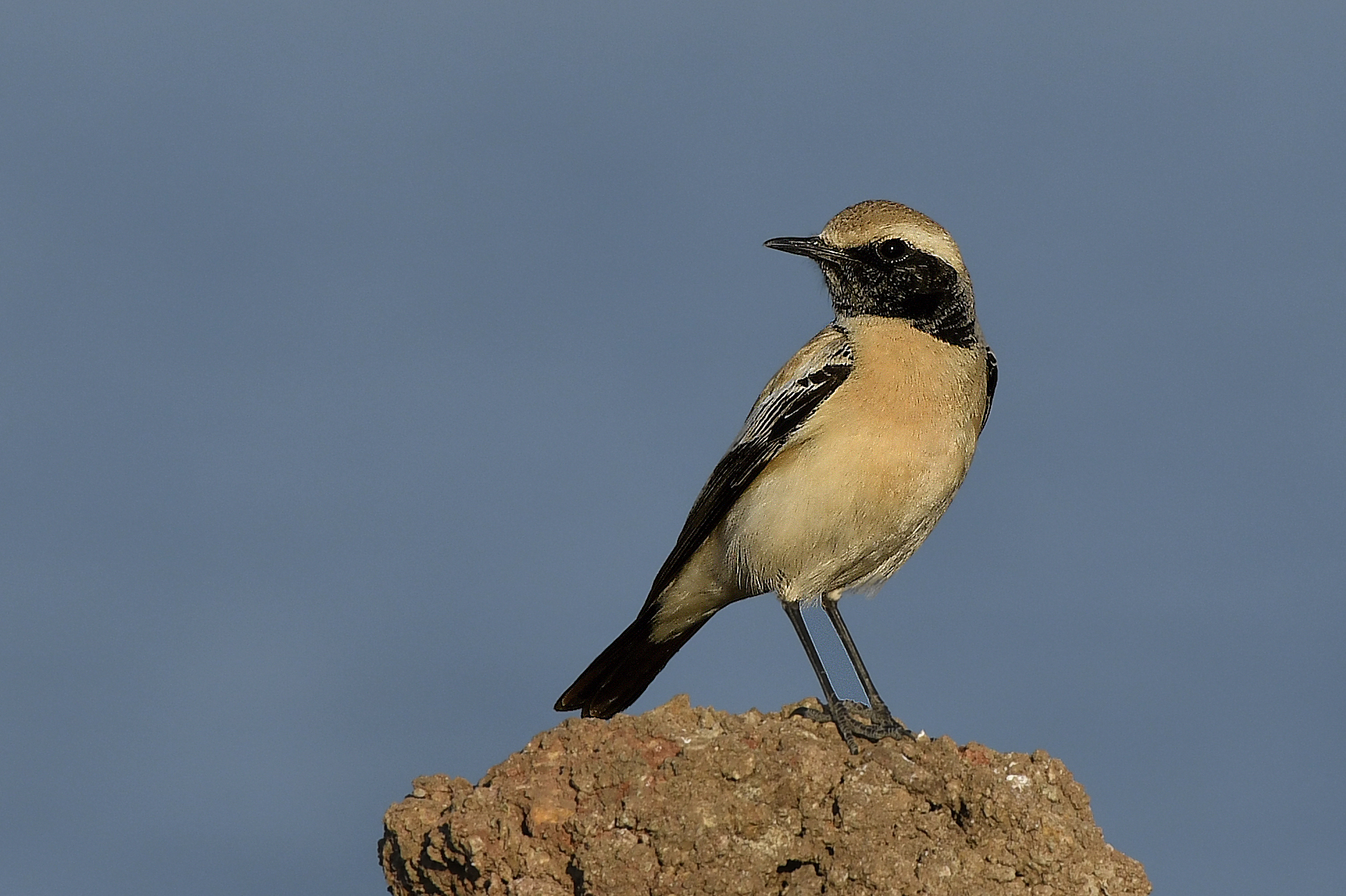
Male in Gujarat, India

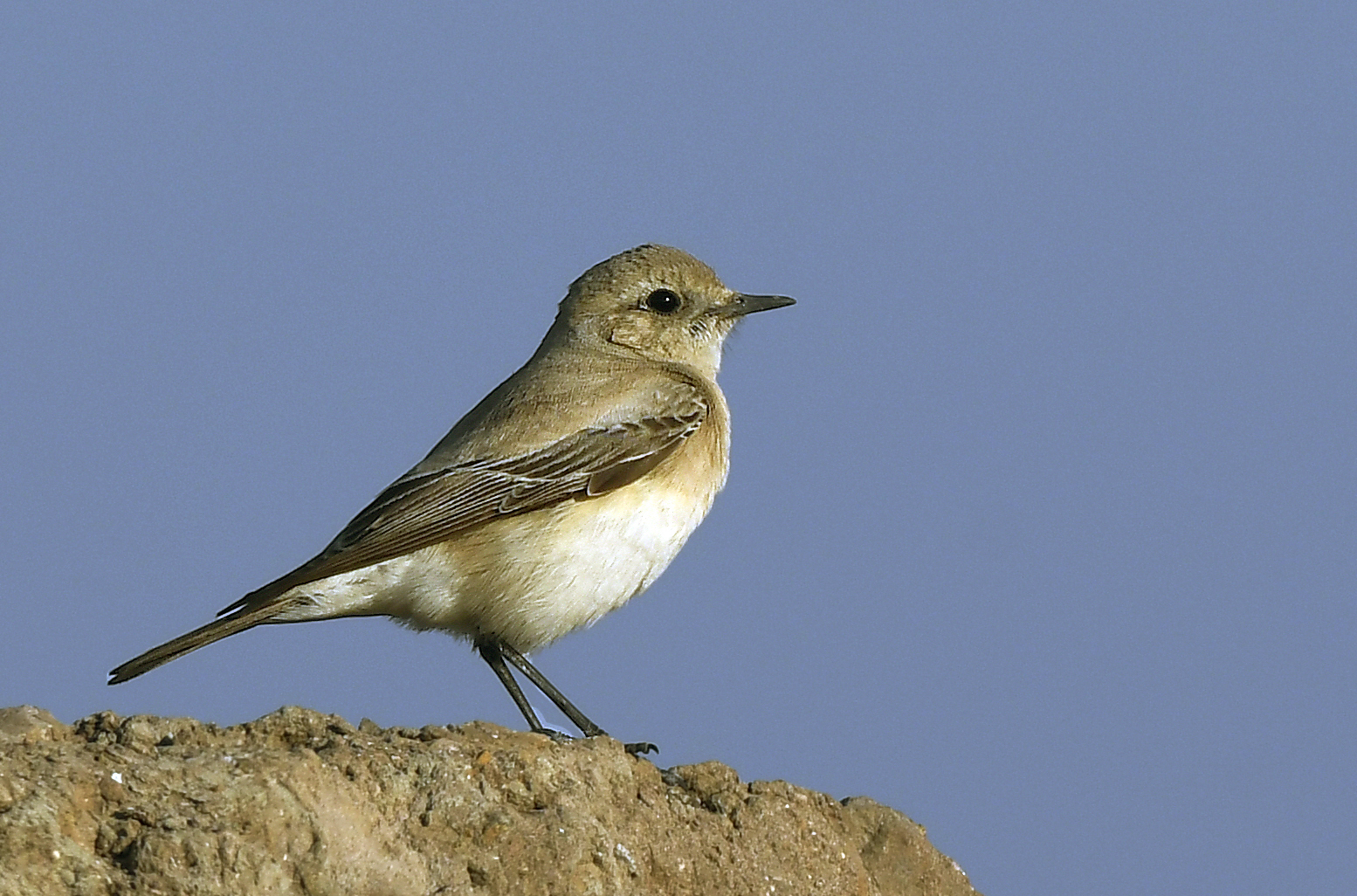
Female in Gujarat, India

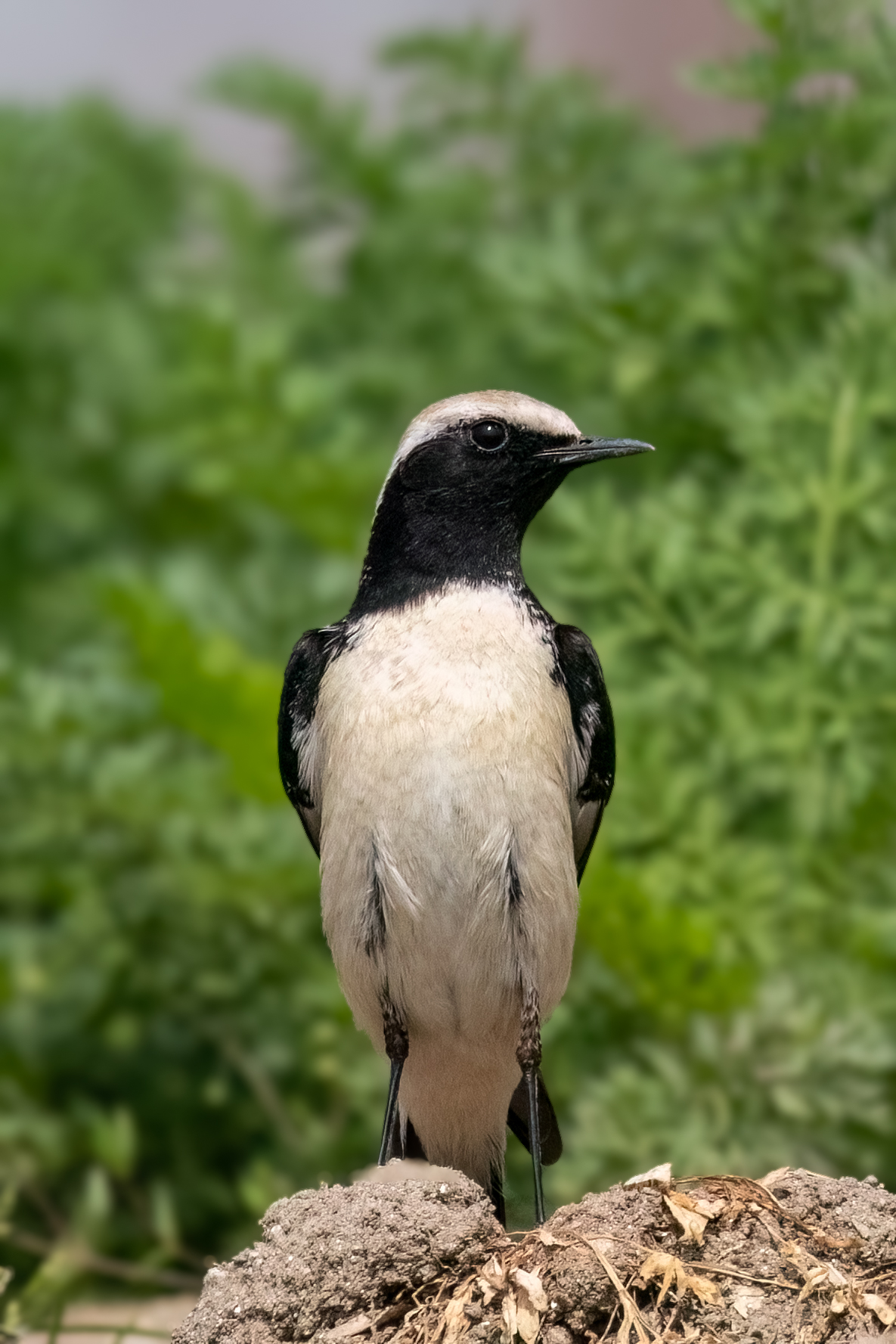
Male in Nepal

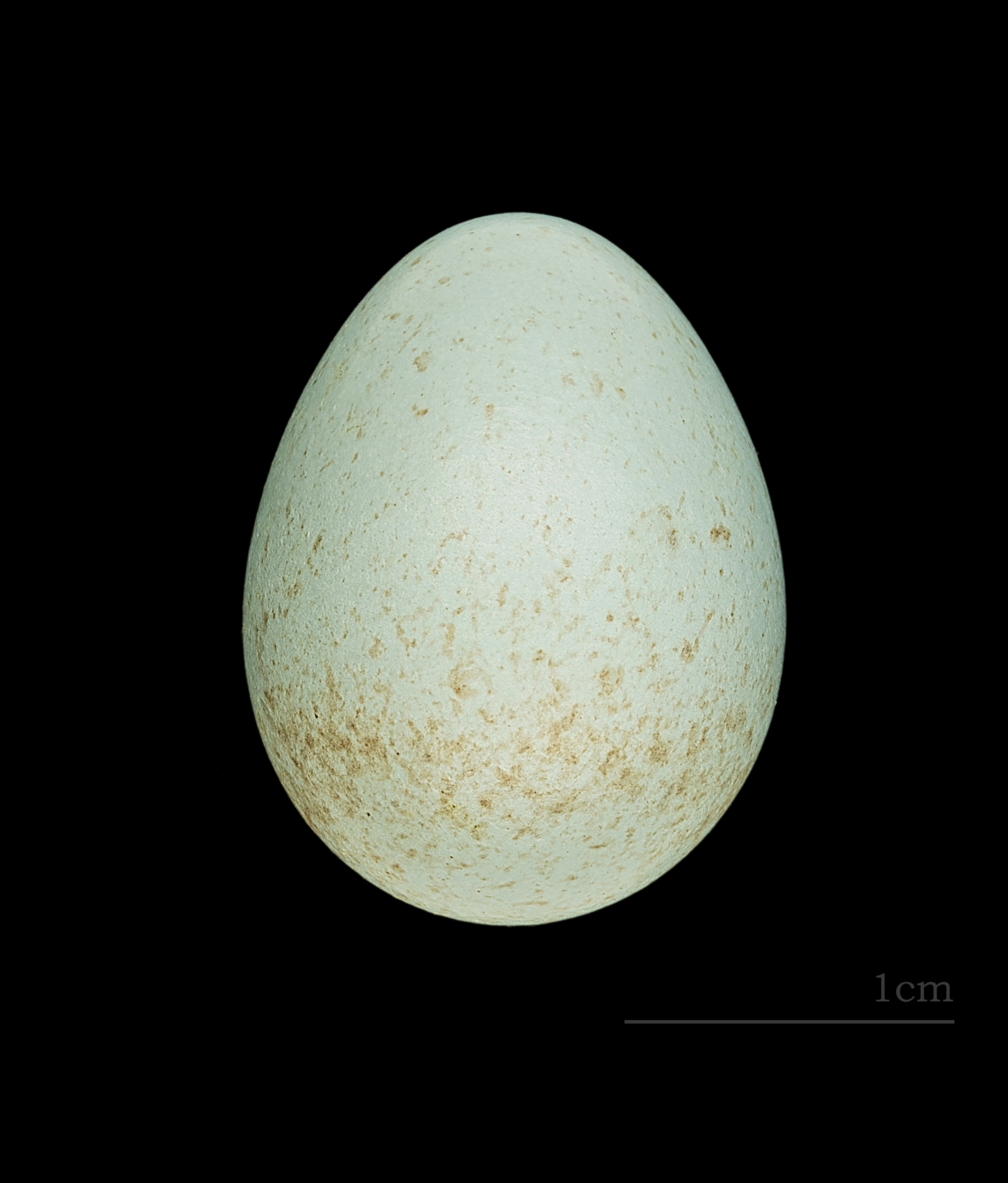
Oenanthe deserti homochroa egg MHNT
