= Provinces of Scotland =

Historical subdivisions of Scotland

The provinces of Scotland were the primary subdivisions of the early Kingdom of Alba, first recorded in the 10th century and probably developing from earlier Pictish territories. Provinces were led by a mormaer, the leader of the most powerful provincial kin-group, and had military, fiscal and judicial functions. Their high degree of local autonomy made them important regional powerbases for competing claimants to the throne of Alba.

Provinces declined in importance during the late 12th and early 13th centuries as expanding royal power saw feudal landholding rather than local kinship established as the dominant basis of secular authority. The power of mormaers became increasingly focused on their earldom, the territory that they controlled directly, rather than their leadership of the broader provincial community, and large provincial lordships were established that often rivalled earldoms in size and were granted to loyal supporters of the king. Local justice and administration became increasingly dominated by sheriffdoms, which were more directly under royal control.

== Geography ==
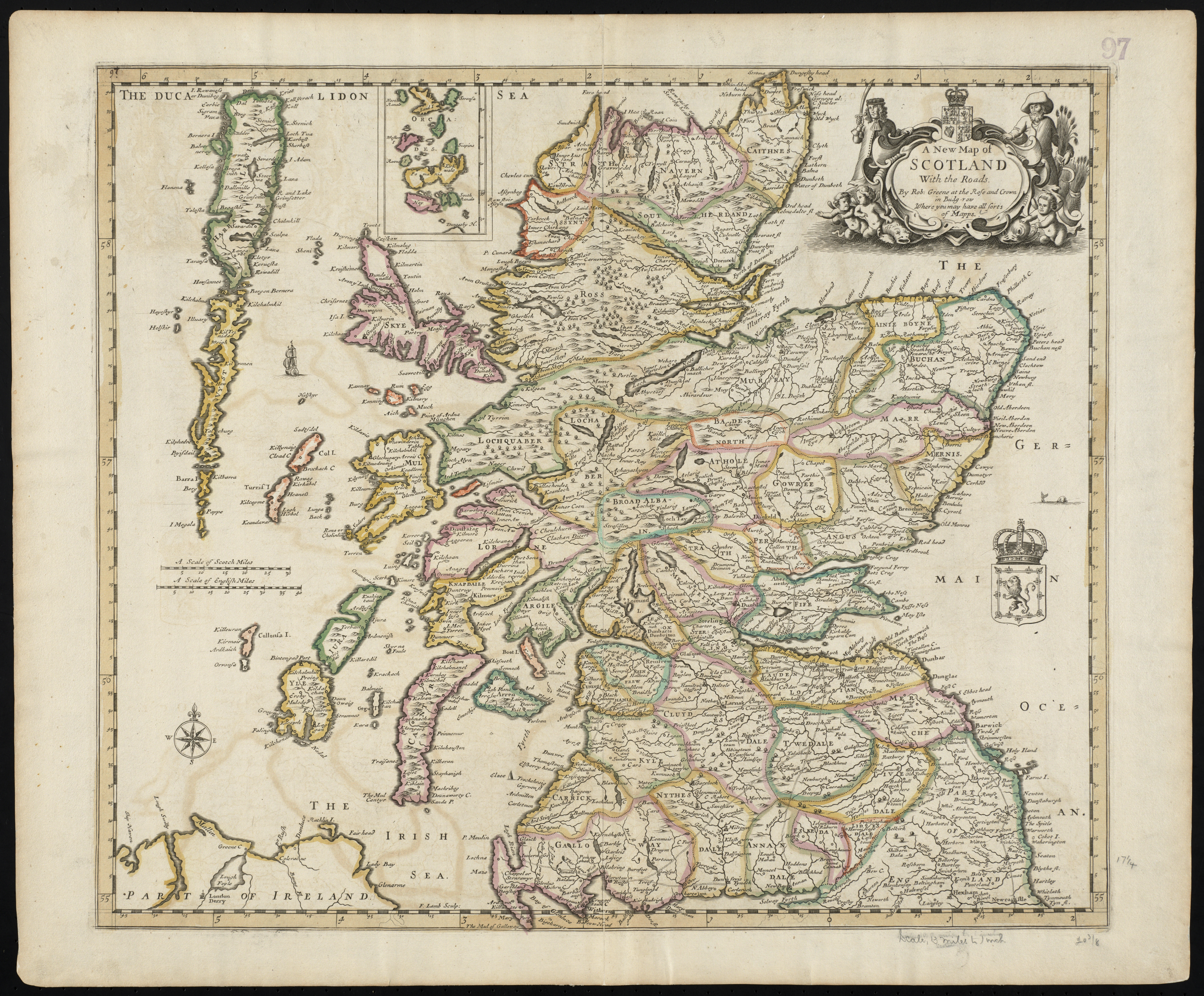
Map of Scottish provinces in 1689.

Before the early 13th century "Scotland" (Latin: Scotia, Old Irish: Albu) was considered to extend only between the Firth of Forth and the River Spey. Within this area the provinces directly subject to the kings of Alba by the 12th century were Fife, Strathearn, Atholl, Gowrie, Angus, the Mearns, Mar, and Buchan.

To the north of the Spey were territories also referred to as provinces, but whose status was more uncertain. Moray may at times during the 11th century have operated as a separate kingdom or as a base for competing claimants for the throne of Alba, and control by the kings of Alba remained variable until 1230. Ross occupied an ambiguous and shifting status between the Gaelic-speakers to the south and the Norse inhabitants to the north until it was established as an earldom in the reign of Malcolm III, remaining an area of fluctuating royal control until 1215. Caithness remained under the control of the Norse earls of Orkney, who were subject to the king of Norway, until 1231.

To the south of the Forth, in formerly Northumbrian or British areas controlled by the kings of Alba but still administered as separate territories, the Earldoms of Dunbar, The Lennox and Carrick were also sometimes referred to as provinces, but were much later creations of the late 12th century and were always explicitly feudal landholdings.

== History ==
=== Origins and function ===
The names of provinces begin to appear in contemporary records of events in the Kingdom of Alba from about 900; before this date sources instead refer to earlier Pictish territories such as Fortriu, Circin and Cé. The degree of continuity between provinces and these earlier territories is uncertain. Some names of earlier units such as Cait, Fife and Atholl survived as the names of later provinces, and it is possible that some of the other provinces had existed before 900 as subdivisions of wider territories, but increased in prominence as the importance of these wider territories declined.

By the late 10th century the Mormaer (Latin: Comes, Scots: Earl) was established as the leading figure in each province. This transition is most clearly seen in the case of Atholl, which is recorded having a king in 739, but a mormaer in 965. The mormaer of a province raised and led the army of the province in battle, oversaw the exercise of justice within the province, and was supported by tribute raised from defined areas within the province. Although the mormaer was the ultimate head of a provincial community their power was only exercised in conjunction with other local potentates. Provincial assemblies would include a wide range of men from a province with the mormaer as only one of a number of influential local figures. The position of mormaer does not appear to have been hereditary before the late 12th century, instead being held by the most powerful head of kin within a province and sometimes alternating between different kin-groups. Provinces could also function without mormaers: King Edgar took the mormaership of Mearns directly into his own hands in 1097, and the mormaership of Gowrie was in the hands of the crown by the reign of Alexander I, though as late as the reign of Malcolm IV charters were still distinguishing between manors within Gowrie held by the king in his capacity as king and those held by virtue of his control of the mormaerdom.

Each province had at least one Brithem (Latin: Iudex, Scots: Dempster) a hereditary legal expert charged with upholding the laws, appointed not by the king but locally from within the province. A province's brithem made and transmitted new law in accordance with local custom; settled cases, particularly land disputes, witnessed charters and witnessed and took part in the perambulation of boundaries. Minor legal disputes were settled at local cuthill courts, but major disputes were settled by summoning provincial assemblies that also included the provincial army. Each province also had a specific location where stolen property and warrantors could be taken for hearings, and at least one toiseachdeor, whose job was to be the custodian of holy objects for the swearing of oaths.

At this stage the provinces of Alba retained many "national" characteristics, with their own networks of clientage and kinship, their own assemblies and their own ecclesiastical hierarchies. Although kings of Alba maintained extensive royal territory within provinces, control of provinces by kings was on the basis of reciprocal relationships and accommodations with local power-groups. Provinces could form the basis for powerful regional hegemonies, often varying in their support for different royal lines. This system of competing royal lineages with different provincial powerbases led to a pattern of violent royal succession, with twelve of the twenty kings ruling between 858 and 1093 being killed in internal violence by their own subjects. In turn kings defeating mormaer-led provincial rebellions could respond by taking more provincial territory into their own direct control. The crown held far more land than the mormaer within Angus, possibly as a result of conflict between the Mormaers of Angus and the kings Kenneth II and Malcolm II, and the Mearns was taken entirely into royal hands by King Edgar in response to the killing of his father Duncan II by the Mormaer of Mearns in 1094.

=== Decline ===
De Situ Albanie, a document written between 1202 and 1214, envisaged Scotland north of the Forth being made up entirely of provinces, mentioning no other contemporary land units, but in reality this structure was already beginning to fragment by this date. From the 1160s onwards aristocratic power and jurisdiction moved away from being seen as having a provincial and social basis, instead coming to be seen within a framework of individual territorial landholdings, while centralised royal power over territory increased and came to be exercised through formal institutions of local government known as sheriffdoms.

The 12th and early 13th centuries saw major changes to the role of the mormaer, increasingly called an earl as Scots replaced Gaelic as the dominant vernacular language. During the late 12th century an explicit distinction began to made between the provincia or province, the broad territory and community from which an earl took their name, and the comitatus or earldom, the smaller landholdings within the province that the earl directly controlled and held from the king. By the early 13th century the earl's power had become increasingly focused on this territorial earldom rather than on their leadership of the wider province, and the earldom became a position that was directly inherited in the male line, as landholding replaced kinship as the dominant basis for secular power. Royal thanages, landholdings held by a thane directly of the king and independently of the provincial community, appear within provinces from the early 13th century, and royal control within provinces was further strengthened by the alienation of royal land to a king's supporters, including large provincial lordships such as Garioch that rivalled earldoms in size. By 1221 earls were forbidden from entering the land of any other lord and had lost control over raising the provincial army, with individual landowners having responsibility for raising the army from their own territories.

The provincial brithem, who had been prominent in legal documents in the 12th century, appears in a much more subordinate position by the end of the 13th century, eventually sinking to the point of virtual insignificance. A law enacted under David I required every brithem in a province to attend when the king entered that province and between the reigns of David I and William I kings sought to link brithem more closely to their authority. By the end of the 12th century kings increasingly saw themselves rather than brithem as the main source of lawmaking. Sheriffs are recorded in the former Northumbrian areas south of the Forth from the 1120s, spreading north of the Forth over the following century. The role of the sheriff seems initially to have been limited to the collection of revenue from burghs and other royal lands, but by the 1180s sheriffs had authority over defined geographical areas and were expected to hold regular courts, as well as having the right to attend the courts of all nobles, including earls, within their area. By the mid 13th century a uniform system of sherriffdoms covered the country, supervised by a Justiciar of Scotia, unlike the brithem explicitly an agent of the king.

By the 1260s the sheriffdom was the cornerstone of Scottish government, collecting the revenue that funded central royal government and extending the reach of royal power into aristocratic jurisdictions, while over the course of the 14th and 15th centuries the role of the earl became increasingly honorific, with many having even fewer direct associations with the provinces after which they were named. The provinces did not become obsolete, however, retaining at least a symbolic unity and continuing to be referred to by writers over following centuries.

== Bibliography ==
- Barrow, G. W. S. (1966). "The Scottish "Judex" in the Twelfth and Thirteenth Centuries". The Scottish Historical Review. 45 (139): 16–26.
- Broun, Dauvit (2007). Scottish Independence and the Idea of Britain From the Picts to Alexander III. Edinburgh: Edinburgh University Press. ISBN 9780748623617.
- Broun, Dauvit (2015). "Statehood and lordship in 'Scotland' before the midtwelfth century". Innes Review. 66 (1): 1–71. doi:10.3366/inr.2015.0084.
- Evans, Nicholas (2019). "A historical introduction to the northern Picts". In Noble, Gordon; Evans, Nicholas (eds.). The King in the North: The Pictish realms of Fortriu and Ce. Collected essays written as part of the University of Aberdeen's Northern Picts project. Edinburgh: Birlinn. pp. 10–38. ISBN 9781780275512.
- Grant, Alexander (2000). "The construction of the early Scottish state". In Maddicot, J. R.; Palliser, D. M. (eds.). The Medieval State: essays presented to James Campbell. London: Hambledon Press. pp. 47–72. ISBN 9781780275512.
- Grant, Alexander (2012). "The Province of Ross and the Kingdom of Alba". In Cowan, Edward J.; McDonald, R. Andrew (eds.). Celtic Scotland in the Middle Ages. Edinburgh: John Donald. pp. 88–126. ISBN 9781906566579.
- Taylor, Alice (2016). The Shape of the State in Medieval Scotland, 1124–1290. Oxford: Oxford University Press. ISBN 9780198749202.
- Woolf, Alex (2007). From Pictland to Alba 789–1070. Edinburgh: Edinburgh University Press. ISBN 9780748612345.
