= St Mary's Chapel, Rattray =

Coordinates: 57.610521°N 1.853857°W

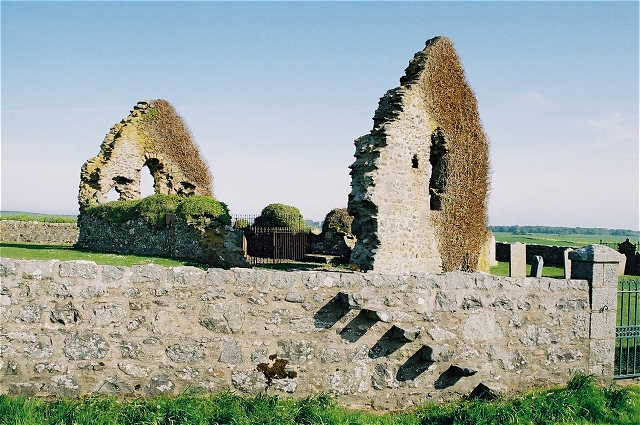
St Mary's Chapel

St Mary's Chapel (known also as "the Chapel of the Blessed Virgin") is a late 12th/early 13th century chapel found in Rattray, Aberdeenshire, Scotland. It was built by William Comyn, jure uxoris Earl of Buchan during the same period as the Castle of Rattray and was "private chapel for the castle" and its residents. "Dedicated to the Virgin Mary" it was possibly constructed after the "drowning of a"... [unknown] "son of Comyn in the well near by."

There is some controversy as to the date of the chapel's construction. There is a wall plaque with the date 911, but this is certainly a fake as the style of the church and its windows did not appear in Scotland until the late 12th century, which coincides with an account that states it "probably dates back to the late 1100s." William Comyn did not inherit the Earldom of Buchan until 1212, so the chapel's construction almost certainly did not begin prior to this date.

William Comyn is recorded as giving the chapel "a gift of wax" on a yearly basis "between 1214 and 1233" so it must have at least been under construction as early as 1214. The gift "derived from bees" had a weight of "two stones" (approx. 10.8 kg) and was the full amount that Comyn received from "Cospatric Macmadethyn"... "at Whitsunday yearly" for the rent of the "lands and mill of Stratheyn and Kyndrochet".

One account gives the specific date of construction as 1220.
