= Sylvester Rattray =

Scottish medical writer

- Occupation: Medical writer

Sylvester Rattray (fl. 1650–1666) was a Scottish medical writer.

== Biography ==
Rattray was a native of Angus, Scotland. He was descended from Sir Sylvester Rattray, of Rattray Castle, Perthshire, who was in 1463 one of the ambassadors sent to London to treat with Edward IV, and exerted great influence at the Scottish court.

Sylvester may have been son of a later Sylvester Rattray who had two sons, David and Sylvester. The latter is said to have been "bred to the church". On the title-page of the second book mentioned below he is, however, credited with a theological degree as well as with that of M.D.

He was author of Aditus novus ad occultas Sympathiæ et Antipathiæ causas inveniendas, per principia philosophiæ naturalis, ex fermentorum artificiosa anatomia hausta, patefactus (Glasgow, 1658), dedicated to Johannes Scotus. The Aditus novus was reprinted in Theatrum Sympatheticum variorum Authorum de Pulvere Sympathetico (Nuremberg, 1662). Rattray's second book, Prognosis medica ad usum Praxeos facili methodo digesta, was dedicated to Dr. John Wedderburn (Glasgow, 1666).

In May 1652 Rattray married at Cupar, Fifeshire, "Ingells, King-gask's daughter".

He had a son Sylvester, a student of medicine at Glasgow in 1680.
