= Marjory, Countess of Buchan =

13th-century Scottish noblewoman

Marjory of Buchan
- Countess of Buchan
- Spouse: William Comyn, Lord of Badenoch
- Issue: est. 7 (see family section at bottom)
- Father: Fergus, Earl of Buchan

Marjory, Countess of Buchan, also known as Margaret of Buchan, was a Scottish noblewoman.

== Biography ==
She inherited the earldom from her father, Fergus, Earl of Buchan, who died without male issue. Marjory was married to William Comyn, Lord of Badenoch, the son of Richard Comyn and his wife Hextilda of Tynedale. The marriage was William's second marriage, with William becoming jure uxoris Earl of Buchan.

During 1219, Marjory and William founded the Cistercian Abbey in Deer, dedicated to Mary. William died in 1233, Marjory being Countess in her own right until she was succeeded by her son Alexander, at her death.

== Children ==
Marjory and William are known to have had at least seven children:

- Idonea Comyn, married Gilbert de la Hay of Erroll
- Alexander Comyn, married Elizabeth de Quincy
- William Comyn
- Margory Comyn, married John de Keith
- Fergus Comyn, Lord of Gorgyn
- Elizabeth Comyn, married Uilleam, Earl of Mar
- Agnes Comyn, married Philip de Meldrum
