= John de Vaux (justiciar of Scotia) =

Arms of John de Vaux: Argent, a bend gules

Sir John III de Vaux of Dirleton, was a Scottish knight, who served between 1304 and 1305 as Justiciar of Scotia.

== Life ==
John was the eldest son and heir of Alexander de Vaux. In 1291, he was among the Scottish nobles who swore fealty to King Edward I of England at Berwick during the competition for the Scottish crown.

In 1298, he defended Dirleton Castle against a siege by Anthony Bek, Bishop of Durham. During 1304, Scottish resistance to English oversight waned, with de Vaux a principal party alongside John "the Red" Comyn in negotiating the terms of a peace treaty with Edward I at Strathord. Between 1304 until 1305, he served as joint Justiciar of Scotia and from 1306.supported Robert de Brus during the first few years of First War of Scottish Independence, before his death circa 1309. He was succeeded by his son Thomas.

== Marriage and issue ==
John married Elizabeth, they had the following issue:

- Thomas de Vaux, killed at the Battle of Neville's Cross in 1346. Died without issue.
- William de Vaux, married Catherine Douglas, had issue.
