= Thomas de Lundin =

Scottish noble

- Noble family: de Lundin
- Spouse: daughter of Máel Coluim, Earl of Atholl
- Issue: Alan de Lundin (The Durward); Colin de Lundin
- Father: Máel Coluim of Lundie
- Mother: daughter of Gille Críst, Earl of Mar

Thomas de Lundin, often referred to as Thomas l'Ussier or Thomas Durward (Scottish Gaelic: Tomhas Dorsair), was a 13th-century Scottish nobleman.

Thomas takes his name from the villa of Lundie in Angus (not to be confused with Lundie in Fife), and was one of two known sons of Máel Coluim (Malcolm) of Lundie (the other was Eóghan). His father had married a daughter of Gille Críst, Earl of Mar. It was for this reason that, after the death of Gille Críst, Thomas challenged the right of his successor Donnchad. The dispute resulted in a division of the earldom. Although Donnchad kept the title and most of the territory, Thomas and his family received much of the lowland part of the earldom in compensation.

Thomas was the hostarius of King Alexander II of Scotland until his own death. It was for this reason that his descendants took the surname "Hostarius" (or Durward). He married a daughter, whose name is not known, of Máel Coluim, Earl of Atholl, and by her he sired at least two sons, Alan and Cailean. Thomas appears for the last time in a document dated to 1228.

"Thomas, son of Malcolm of Lunden" who gave the church of Echt (and its revenues) to "God, St. Mary, St Michael and all Saints and to the Abbot and Convent of Scona" at some time between 1214 and 1227. Echt is not far from Birse. "Scona" is Scone, where the kings of Scots were crowned at that time, so it was arguably the most prestigious abbey in Scotland, which would confirm that Thomas had influential connections. Walter of Lundin was granted the barony of Benvie (near Dundee) by King David I (1124–53).

Alan Durward, whose lands of Fichlie were forfeited by King Edward I of England in 1306–7 because of his (Alan's) support for Robert the Bruce. Fichlie is in Aberdeenshire, but in Strathdon, near Kildrummy. Kildrummy was the seat of the earls of Mar, and Thomas the Durward failed in his claim to the earldom. There is also a "motte" (the site of a mediaeval castle) at Fichlie. Alan Durward must have been at least an ally if not a follower.

Thomas de Lundin, became Door-ward or Usher to King William the Lion, and was granted large estates in Aberdeenshire. His son Alan the Durward owned even larger estates, which were divided among his three daughters after his death in 1275.

Thomas de Lundin was the son of Malcolm of Lundie. Whoever he was, he was already important enough to marry the daughter of Gille Críst, Earl of Mar, one of only about a dozen earls existing at that time. Gille Críst is described as "mysterious", and after his death in 1203 his sons did not succeed to the earldom of Mar but, after some time, a son of the earl previous to Gille Críst did. Thomas de Lundin subsequently claimed the earldom without success, but was allocated a large part of its territory. His son Alan, as well as the estates in Aberdeenshire, was granted Urquhart on the west side of Loch Ness and probably built the oldest-surviving part of Castle Urquhart. And "Gilbert Durward, as yet another member of the Durward family, was granted the lands of Boleskin on the eastern shores of Loch Ness around the same time as Alan was granted Urquhart".
