= Justiciar of Scotia =

Legal office in medieval Scotland

The Justiciar of Scotia (in Norman-Latin, Justiciarus Scotie) was the most senior legal office in the High Medieval Kingdom of Scotland. Scotia (meaning Scotland) in this context refers to Scotland to the north of the River Forth and River Clyde. The other Justiciar positions were the Justiciar of Lothian and the Justiciar of Galloway.

The institution has some Anglo-Norman origins, but in Scotland north of the Forth it represented some form of continuity with an older office, a senior version of a Judex or Brithem, a native Scottish lawman often with province-wide responsibilities. Mormaer Causantín of Fife was styled judex magnus (i.e. "great Brehon") in Scotia, and it is probable that the Justiciarship of Scotia was just a further Latinisation/Normanisation of that position. By the middle of the 13th century, the responsibilities of the Justiciar became fully formalised. He supervised the activity and behaviour of royal sheriffs and sergeants, held courts and reported on these things to the king personally.

== List of Justiciars of Scotia, from 1128x1130 to 1449 ==
The following list, going up to 1449, consists of names who appear as Justiciar of Scotia in sources. The sources, especially in the 12th century, are far from exhaustive, and so many names are doubtless missing. In the earliest period, there could be more than one Justiciar in operation at the same point in time.

- Causantín, Mormaer of Fife, judex magnus in Scotia, 1128x1130
- William Cumin, Bishop of Durham (d. c. 1159)
- Duncan II, Mormaer of Fife, 1154x1164-1203
- Matthew, Bishop of Aberdeen, 1172x1199
- Gille Brigte, Mormaer of Strathearn, 1172x1199
- William Comyn, Earl of Buchan, 1205–1232
- Walter fitz Alan, High Steward, appointed 2 Feb 1231/2 to 1241
- Philip de Melville and Robert de Monte Alto [ Robert de Mowat, elder, was appointed April 1241], 1241–1244.
- Alan Durward, Royal Hostarius, 1244–1251
- Philip de Meldrum or Ferdarg (Feradach) and Michael de Monte Alto [ Michael de Mowat ], 1251–1253
- Alan Durward, Royal Hostarius, 1255–1257
- Alexander Comyn, Earl of Buchan, 1258–1289
- Andrew Moray (father of the famous Andrew Moray), 1289x1293-1296x
- William de Mortimer (1296–1297)
- John Comyn, Earl of Buchan, 1300-x1305
- English Tetrarchy, 2 North and 2 South of the Mounth, 1305-1306:
- Reginald Cheyne and John de Vaux, 1305-1306., William Inge, Robert Keith
- Sir William de Montifex or Montfichet of Auchterarder, of Stobhall and of Cargill, before 1328.
- Sir Robert de Lawedre (Lauder), Knt., of Quarrelwood, Edrington, and the Bass (d. 1370), appointed 1328.
- Sir Malcolm Drummond, Earl of Mar, before 1400.
- Sir John Drummond, Thane of Lennox, of Cargill and of Stobhall, and Chief of Clan Drummond (Drymen, 1356-1428), brother of Anabella Drummond
- Alexander of Islay, Earl of Ross and Lord of the Isles, 1437-1449.
