= Northallerton Castle =

Ruined castle in North Yorkshire, England

- Northallerton, North Yorkshire in England
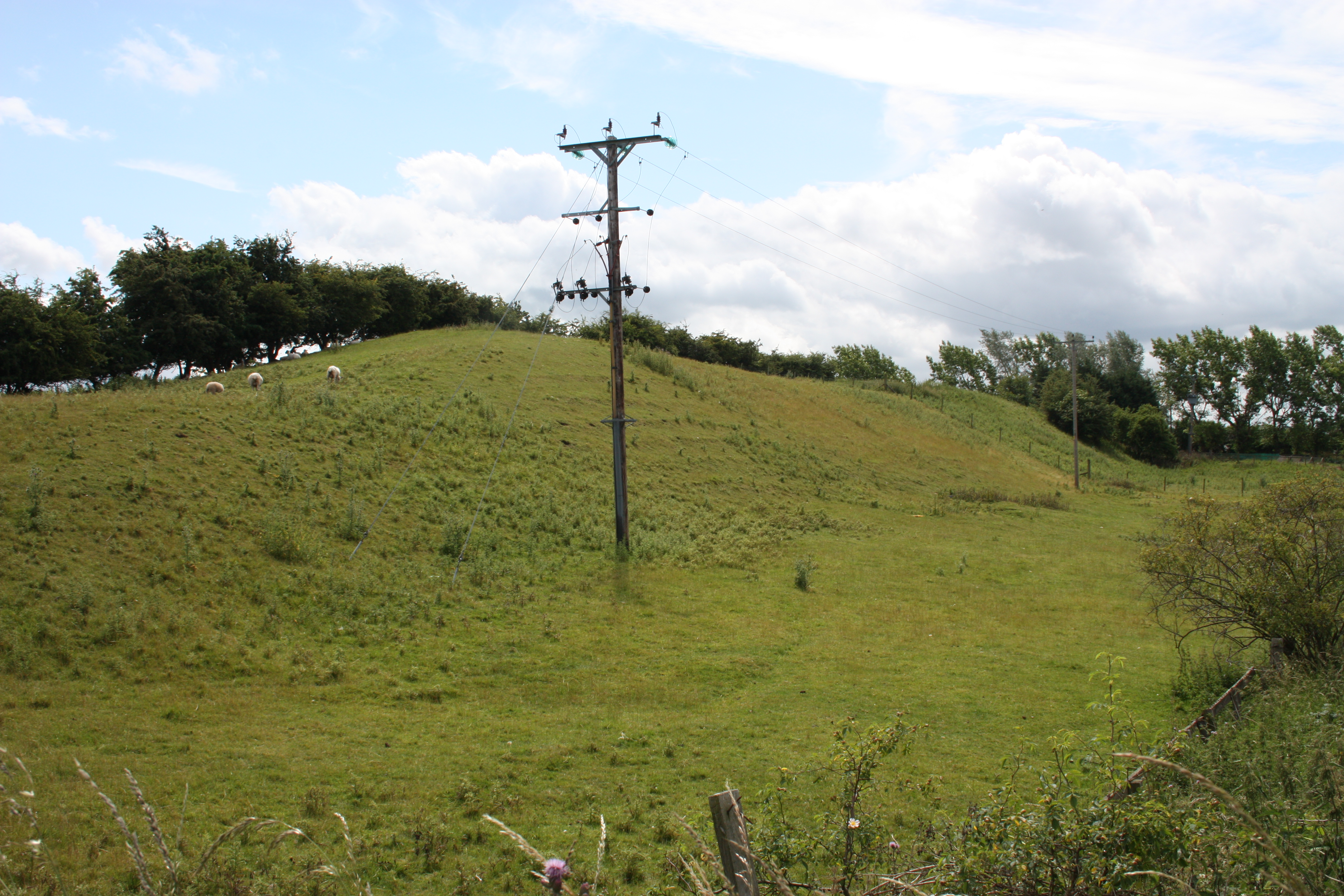
- Mound at Castle Hills in Northallerton

Site information
- Type: Motte and Bailey castle

Location
- Location within North Yorkshire
- Coordinates: 54.341°N 1.446°W
- Grid reference: SE365940

Site history
- Built: c. 1068
- Materials: Timber
- Fate: Demolished c. 1178

Northallerton Castle was a defensive structure in Northallerton in North Yorkshire, England. The structure is thought to have been constructed c. 1068 and was largely made out of timber with a palisade wall. It was destroyed by order of King Henry in 1178. The ground outlines of the site were removed by railway building in the first half of the 19th century.

== History ==
Northallerton Castle, located at what would become known as Castle Hills in the town, was also the site of a possible Roman camp. It was the first of two castles built in Northallerton, though the Bishop's Palace site, the later castle, was more of a fortified manor house. A motte and bailey south-west of the church is recorded as far back as 1068, and a castle was also recorded in the 1140s, (Note: Ingledew describes a castle built in the reign of Henry I (1133–140) which had a moat.) as a property of the Bishop of Durham, being seized by William Cumin as a way of extending the Scottish border southwards. Edwards and I'Anson state that the castle was built by King William in 1068, who was known to have encamped at Northallerton whilst conducting the Harrying of the North.

In 1143, Cumin surrendered the castle to his nephew, Richard Comyn. However, a castle is thought to have been built by Bishop Hugh Pudsey in 1174, who took part in a rebellion against Henry II, leaving the castle in the safe keeping of his nephew, Hugh Count of Bar. Pudsey is also referred to as having "greatly enlarged" the castle at Northallerton around 1174 (the time mentioned above when he was also attributed with its initial building) as a way of providing security for his estates in Allertonshire.

It is known that the location of Castle Hills (SE365940) was the site of some defensive structure made from timber. The great tower and a palisade wall are thought to have been made from wood, but the rest of the castle is undetermined in its structure.

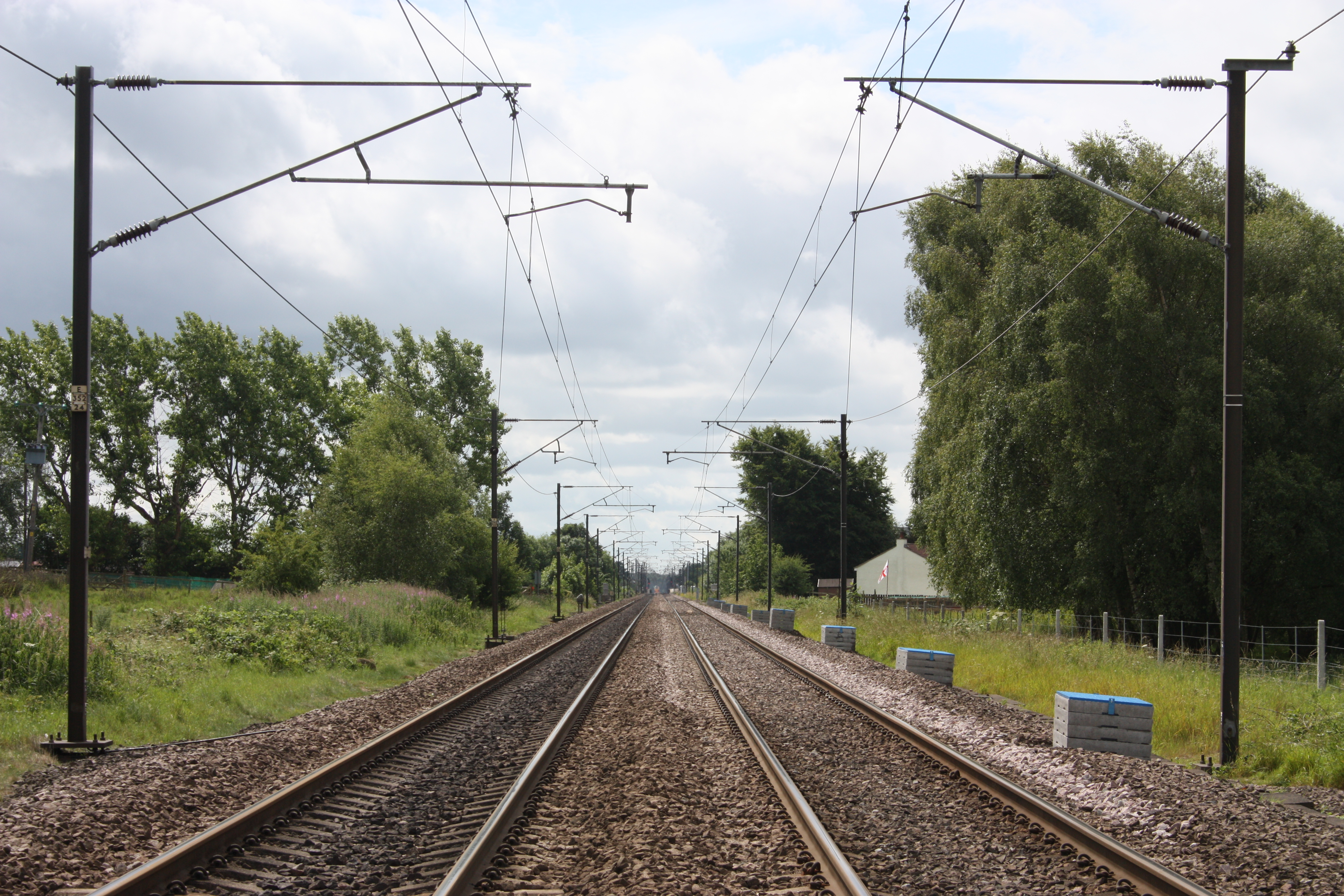
ECML, Castle Hills, Northallerton

A castle was mentioned near to Northallerton during the Battle of the Standard (1138) and since neither of the subsequent castles in Northallerton were in use at that time, it is thought to be the Norman motte at Yafforth, the mound of which is still obvious in modern times. In 1177, Bishop Hugh Pudsey was required to appear before Henry II and account for his actions, having been suspected of allowing Scottish troops free access across his lands in years previous. Pudsey paid a retainer into the royal coffers and surrendered all his castles, however, some reports state that the castle at Northallerton (castellum novum de alverton) was spared, but later destroyed on the wish of the king.

Only the north-eastern arc of the castle edge remains - the rest of the site was destroyed when the railway was built through the location in 1838. Whilst it was being dug out for the tracks, a selection of stones were found, one bearing the inscription INSTANE FLA. HYRO LEG. VI V. However, the stone was lost in 1877.
