= Donnchadh, Earl of Mar =

Scottish noble

Donnchadh

Earl of Mar
- In office 1203–1244

Donnchadh of Mar (Anglicized as Duncan) is the fifth known Mormaer of Mar, 1203–1244.

Donnchadh was the son of Morggán and Agnes. Donnchadh benefited from the introduction of feudal primogeniture as a custom, as it enabled him and his kin to exclude the descendants of Gille Críst, whose contemporary leader was Thomas de Lundin, from the succession. Perhaps in gratitude, he named his oldest son William after King William I, the probable source of the innovation in Mar's inheritance custom. He married Orabillis of Nessius, by whom he fathered William, and died in 1244.

== Bibliography ==
- Anderson, Alan Orr, Early Sources of Scottish History: AD 500-1286, 2 Vols (Edinburgh, 1922), p. 493, n. 1
- Oram, Richard D., "The Earls and Earldom of Mar, c1150-1300," Steve Boardman and Alasdair Ross (eds.) The Exercise of Power in Medieval Scotland, c.1200-1500, (Dublin/Portland, 2003), pp. 46–66
- Roberts, John L., Lost Kingdoms: Celtic Scotland in the Middle Ages, (Edinburgh, 1997), pp. 55–6

Preceded by Gille Críst	Mormaer of Mar; 1203–1244	Succeeded by Uilleam
