= Brithem =

Hereditary legal expert in medieval Scotland

A Brithem (Latin: Judex, Scots: Dempster) was a hereditary legal expert in medieval Scotland, charged with upholding the laws within one of the provinces of Scotland. The role is thought to long predate its first documentary record in the 12th century. At least one brithem was attached to each province, and the role was not a royal appointment, but one that took place within the province. There is no record of any brithem in Lothian, though they are recorded in Galloway.

Brithems oversaw justice at a higher level than would have been dealt with by local cuthill courts: conducting perambulations to settle land disputes, witnessing charters, conducting inquests, supervising legal assemblies and seigneurial courts, and overseeing compensation to the kin of victims of interpersonal violence. Up to the 12th century brithems are also recorded making laws, giving judgements to the exclusion of bishops and abbots, and even over-ruling all other elite attendees of provincial assemblies.

From the reign of William the Lion kings began to see themselves rather the brithem as the main source of law-making, and the role of the brithem gradually sank from a prominent position to one of almost insignificance. From the 1180s a "King's Brithem" (Latin: Judex Regis) starts to appear in charters, a legal expert whose primary connection was not to a province but to the King. The last record of a group of brithems making law is from 1221, and by the end of the 13th century the decline in the status of the brithem was clearly apparent, with brithems appearing in more subordinate positions on witness lists, and appearing only in charters issues by earls, rather than ecclesiastic and royal acts.

== Bibliography ==
- Barrow, G. W. S. (1966). "The Scottish "Judex" in the Twelfth and Thirteenth Centuries". The Scottish Historical Review. 45 (139): 16–26.
- Broun, Dauvit (2015). "Statehood and lordship in 'Scotland' before the midtwelfth century". Innes Review. 66 (1): 1–71. doi:10.3366/inr.2015.0084.
- Grant, Alexander (2000). "The construction of the early Scottish state". In Maddicot, J. R.; Palliser, D. M. (eds.). The Medieval State: essays presented to James Campbell. London: Hambledon Press. pp. 47–72. ISBN 9781780275512.
- Taylor, Alice (2016). The Shape of the State in Medieval Scotland, 1124–1290. Oxford: Oxford University Press. ISBN 9780198749202.
