= Clann-an-oistir =

Doorkeepers to the monastery of Iona

- Type: Doorkeepers of the Monastery of Iona
- Location: Iona, Scotland

The 'Clann-an-oistir' (from the Latin ostuarii) were the doorkeepers to the monastery of Iona.

The first of the family came over from Ireland with Colum Cille, but when they caused the displeasure of that saint, he invoked a curse on them, by which it was decreed that never more than five of his clan should exist at the same time. Accordingly, when a sixth was born, one of the five was to look for death, which always happened until the race was extinguished. A female who died about the middle of the 18th century in Iona was the last person who could trace a lineage to the doorkeepers of this monastery.

== See also ==
- Hostarius (Scotland)
