= Rattray (surname) =

Rattray is a surname of Scottish origin. It was first used by the descendants of Alanus de Ratheriff and is derived from Rattray in Perth and Kinross.

The Rattray Tartan was formally catalogued on 27 March 1969. Notable people with the Rattray surname include:

- Arthur Rullion Rattray (1891–1966), British naval officer
- Cathy Rattray-Williams (born 1963), Jamaican track and field sprinter
- Celine Rattray (born 1975), English film producer
- Charlie Rattray (1911–1995), English footballer
- Colin Rattray (1931–2009), Australian politician
- David Grey Rattray (1958–2007), South African historian
- David Rattray (born 1970), Scottish sport shooter
- James Rattray (1818–1854), British Army officer and war artist
- Jamie Lee Rattray (born 1992), Canadian ice hockey player
- Robert Sutherland Rattray (1881–1938), British anthropologist and Africanist
- Sylvester Rattray (fl. 1650–1666), Scottish medical writer
- Tania Rattray (born 1958), Australian politician, daughter of Colin Rattray
- Thomas Rattray (1684–1743), Primus of the Scottish Episcopal Church

== See also ==
- Clan Rattray
- Devin Ratray (born 1977), American actor
