= Brecheen =

Brecheen is a surname. Notable people with the surname include:

- Harry Brecheen (1914–2004), American baseball player
- Josh Brecheen (born 1979), American politician
