= Battle of Inverurie (1308) =

Battle in the north-east of Scotland in May 1308 according to Fordun

Coordinates: 57.335°N 2.318°W

- Part of Wars of Scottish Independence
Date	23 May 1308
Location	Oldmeldrum, Aberdeenshire, Scotland
Result	Royalist Victory

Belligerents
Scottish Royal Army	Scottish Rebels

Commanders and leaders
Robert the Bruce	John Comyn, 3rd Earl of Buchan; David, Lord of Brechin

Strength
Unknown	Unknown

Casualties and losses
Unknown	Unknown

Registered battlefield
- Official name: Battle of Barra
- Designated: 30 November 2011
- Reference no.: BTL18

The Battle of Inverurie, also known as the Battle of Barra, was fought in the north-east of Scotland and was a victory for the Scottish king Robert Bruce over his chief domestic enemy, John Comyn, 3rd Earl of Buchan. Though part of the wider Wars of Scottish Independence, it is more properly viewed as an episode in a brief but bitter civil war. It was followed by the Harrying of Buchan, a violent act of destruction of property long remembered with bitterness in Buchan. The battle was fought in May 1308 according to Fordun. However, Barbour states clearly that it was fought at Christmas of 1307. Many current historians accept Fordun's date, but Barron and some others believe that Bower misinterpreted Fordun's notes. The battlefield was added to the Inventory of Historic Battlefields in Scotland in 2011.

== Background ==
In February 1306, Robert Bruce and his supporters killed John III Comyn, Lord of Badenoch, also known as the Red Comyn. Comyn was a nephew of the former king John Balliol and had been a leading player in the wars against the English. His death automatically meant that his extensive network of family and associates would regard Bruce as an enemy. Chief among these was Comyn's cousin and namesake, John Comyn, Earl of Buchan. Edward I of England died in July 1307. His son, Edward II, preoccupied with political problems at home, left his Scottish allies unsupported at a critical time. Bruce acted quickly, on the assumption that the English were bound to return in strength for the campaigning season in 1308.

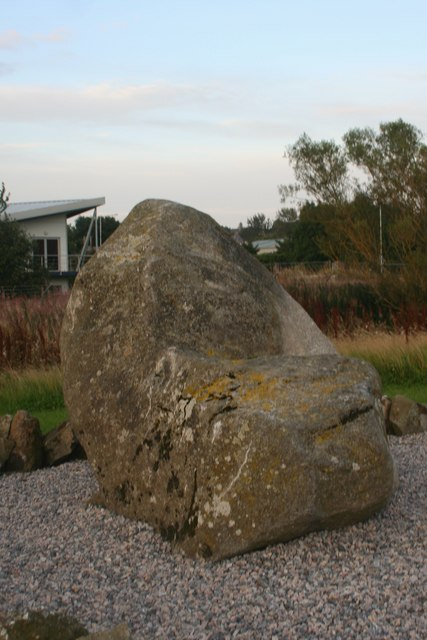
Bruce's Seat, the stone from which King Robert is reputed to have directed the battle

== Prelude ==
One by one King Robert confronted his domestic enemies, beginning with the Balliol party in Galloway. From the south of the country he moved through the English-held central lowlands, making his way by the western route through Argyllshire through the Great Glen towards Inverness and the north-east, towards the territory held by Buchan. He had under his command as many as 3,000 men according to a letter sent by the Earl of Ross to King Edward. However, that number may have been an exaggeration in order for the earl to justify his inaction against King Robert. However, King Robert was overtaken by an unknown illness, which kept him out of action for a considerable time, and he had with him no more than about 700 men by the time of the Battle of Inverurie.

Unfortunately the only accounts of the whole campaign in Aberdeenshire are from sources uniformly hostile to Buchan. Although Buchan made some attempt to take advantage of the situation by an attack by archers on the king's camp at Slioch, which was repulsed. Edward Bruce shifted his camp to Strathbogie, and the king was carried there on a litter.

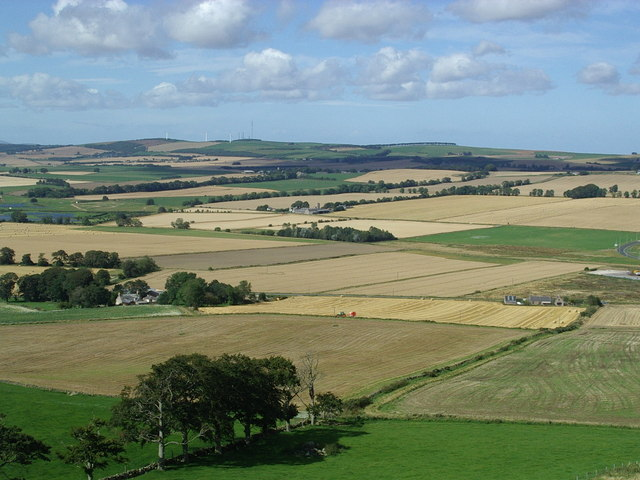
View of the Bruce Field, the site of the battle

== Battle ==
During his illness, King Robert was carried from place to place by his supporters. In either December 1307 or May 1308 depending on which account is correct, his army made camp on the far side of Inverurie near Oldmeldrum. Buchan gathered his forces, ready to attack King Robert the following day. His army made camp at Meldrum, to the north-east of King Robert. At dawn, David, Lord of Brechin made a surprise attack on one of King Robert's outposts, killing many; the rest fled to the main force on the far side of Inverurie.

King Robert, who was still ill, rose from his bed and prepared a counter-attack. As he approached, Buchan hastily drew up his forces astride the road to Inverurie, between Barra Hill and the marshes of the Lochter Burn. His unreliable feudal levies were placed to the rear, with the knights and men-at-arms taking up a position to the front. The levies seem to have been given the assurance that King Robert was too ill to take to the field in person, and their shocked reaction when he came into sight explains in part why Buchan's army collapsed so quickly. John Barbour describes the scene in his rhyming narrative:

The king came on in fine array

With much display his foes stood set
Until the ranks were ne[a]rly met.
But when his foemen saw the king
Advancing without lingering,
A little on their reins they drew.
The king by this time right well knew
That in their hearts they were distressed,
And with his banners forward pressed.
Thus they retreated more and more.
And when the small folk with them saw
Their leaders all retreating so,
They quickly turned their backs to go,
And fled and scattered far and wide.
Their lords, that still were side by side,
When they beheld the small folk flee,
And the king advancing steadily,
Themselves became disheartened so
That they, too, turned their backs to go.
A short while stayed they side by side,
And then they scattered far and wide.

Buchan made some attempt to steady the line, but he too soon joined the flight, pursued by the King's men as far as Fyvie. Later that year, probably after the fall of his castles, the fugitive earl took his flight to England, where he died the same year. The Battle of Inverurie and the Harrying of Buchan ended active resistance to King Robert in Aberdeenshire. He was not, however, prepared to risk leaving a potentially hostile district in his rear, and took drastic action which was to last in living memory for some fifty years beyond the event.

Immediately following the battle, King Robert ordered his men to burn to the ground farms, homes, and strongholds associated with the Comyns in the violent Harrying of Buchan.
