= Richard Comyn =

Scottish noble, died c. 1179

Richard Comyn (died c. 1179) was a Scottish noble of unknown parentage who is known to have been the nephew of William Cumin.

== Biography ==
Richard was probably born between 1115 and 1123. In 1144, William Comyn gave him Northallerton Castle, which he had re-built a few years earlier. Shortly after, he received the castle and honour of Richmond as part of his uncle's settlement to renounce to Durham bishopric. In 1145, Richard married Hextilda of Tynedale, the daughter of Uchtred (or Hadrian) of Tynedale, Lord of Tynedale, and wife Bethóc ingen Domnaill Bain, the only known child and daughter of King Donald III of Scotland.

In Scotland, he acquired the position of Justiciar of Lothian: he witnessed 6 charters for King Malcolm IV and 33 for King William I. He was captured with King William in 1174 and was a hostage for him in the Treaty of Falaise. He gave, with Hextida's consent, lands to the monks at Hexham, Kelso and Holyrood. He died between 1179 and 1182. Hextilda remarried to Máel Coluim, Earl of Atholl (also called Malcolm).

== Children ==
Richard had four sons and three daughters by Hextilda:

- John, died between 1152 and 1159, and buried at Kelso Abbey
- William, jure uxoris Earl of Buchan
- Odinel (also called Odo), a priest, witness to Richard's charters to religious houses in 1162 and 1166
- Simon, mentioned in the 1166 charter to the Augustinians in Holyrood
- Idonea
- Ada
- Margaret - Countess of Atholl by marriage to Henry, Earl of Atholl

His daughters were witnesses to a donation made by Máel Coluim, Earl of Atholl and their mother Hextilda to the Church of St Cuthbert in Durham.
