= James Dun's House =

House in Aberdeen City, Scotland

Coordinates: 57.1478°N 2.1010°W

James Dun's House is located in Aberdeen, Scotland. It is located at Schoolhill and was a popular museum and gallery with changing exhibitions, but in 2001 was converted into a hairdresser and cafe.

It was built in 1769 and was owned by James Dun who was the rector of Aberdeen Grammar School which used to be located on Schoolhill before being moved in the 19th century.
