= Alexander Comyn, Earl of Buchan =

Scoto-Norman magnate in 13th century Kingdom of Scotland

Alexander Comyn, 2nd Earl Buchan
- Coat of arms as Earl of Buchan
- In office 1286–1289

Guardian of Scotland
- Preceded by: Donnchadh IV, Earl of Fife
- Succeeded by: James Stewart, 5th High Steward of Scotland

Justiciar of Scotia
- In office 1258–1289
- Preceded by: Alan Durward
- Succeeded by: Andreas de Moravia

Constable of Scotland
- In office 1275–1289
- Preceded by: Marjory, Countess of Buchan
- Succeeded by: John Comyn, Earl of Buchan

Personal details
- Born: Unknown (circa 1218) Buchan, Aberdeenshire
- Died: Unknown (late 1289) Northern Scotland
- Spouse: Elizabeth (or Isabel or Isabella) de Quincy
- Children: Roger, Marjorie, Elisabetha, William, Emma, John, Elena
- Parent(s): William Comyn, Lord of Badenoch; Marjory, Countess of Buchan
- Occupation: Sheriff, Baillie
- Also served as Sheriff of Wigtown and Dingwall and Baillie of Inverie. Dates of rule unknown.

Alexander Comyn, 2nd Earl of Buchan (died 1289) was a Scoto-Norman magnate who was one of the most important figures in the 13th century Kingdom of Scotland.

== Life ==
He was the son of William Comyn, Lord of Badenoch, and wife Marjory, Countess of Buchan, the heiress of the last native Scottish Mormaer of Buchan, Fergus. He was the chief counsellor of Alexander III, King of Alba (Scotland) for the entire period of the king's majority and as Scotland's leading magnate, played a key role in safeguarding the independence of the Scottish monarchy. During his long career, Alexander Comyn was Justiciar of Scotia (1258–1289), Constable of Scotland (1275–1289), Sheriff of Wigtown (1263–1266), Sheriff of Dingwall (1264–1266), Baillie of Inverie (in Knoydart) and finally, Guardian of Scotland (1286–1289) during the first interregnum following the death of Alexander III. In 1284 he joined with other Scottish noblemen who acknowledged Margaret of Norway as the heiress to King Alexander. He died sometime after 10 July 1289.

== Marriage and issue ==
Alexander had at least nine children with his wife, Elizabeth (or Isabel or Isabella) de Quincy, daughter of Roger de Quincy, 2nd Earl of Winchester, and wife Helen of Galloway:

- John Comyn, Earl of Buchan, Alexander's successor as Earl of Buchan;
- Roger;
- Lord Alexander Comyn, sheriff of Aberdeen, married Joan, sister of William Latimer, 4th Baron Latimer, and had issue. Henry de Beaumont would claim the Earldom of Buchan through marriage to their daughter, Alice;
- Lord William Comyn, Provost of St. Mary's Church, St Andrews;
- Lady Marjorie Comyn married Patrick IV, Earl of March;
- Lady Agnes Egidia Comyn married Malise III, Earl of Strathearn;
- Lady Elisabetha Comyn married Gilbert de Umfraville, Earl of Angus;
- Lady Elena Comyn married Sir William de Brechin;
- Lady Annora Comyn married Nicholas I de Soules.

== Sources ==
- Rymer, Thomas;Foedera Conventiones, Literae et cuiuscunque generis Acta Publica inter Reges Angliae, London, 1745. (Latin)
- Young, Alan; Robert the Bruce's Rivals: The Comyns, 1213–1314, (East Linton, 1997).
- Young, Alan and Cumming, George; The Real Patriots of Early Scottish Independence, Birlinn, (Edinburgh, 2014).

Peerage of Scotland
Preceded by Marjory m. William Comyn	Earl of Buchan; 1244–1289	Succeeded by John Comyn
Legal offices
Preceded by Alan Durward	Justiciar of Scotia; 1258–1289	Succeeded by Andreas de Moravia
