= Philip de Meldrum =

13th-century Scottish noble

Philip de Meldrum, (Note: Also known as Philip de Fedarg or Philip de Melgarum) Lord of Meldrum, Justiciar of Scotia, was a Scottish noble. He was a son of Philippe de Fedarg.

Philip was granted the position of Justiciar of Scotia in 1251, which was the most senior legal office in the Kingdom of Scotland. This position covered the area of Scotland north of the River Forth and River Clyde.

== Marriage and issue ==
Philip married Agnes, daughter of William Comyn, Lord of Badenoch, Justiciar of Scotland and Marjory, Countess of Buchan, they are known to have had the following issue:

- William de Meldrum
- Thomas de Meldrum
- Alexander de Meldrum
