= Rattray, Aberdeenshire =

Historic settlement on the coast of east Scotland

Coordinates: 57°36′33″N 1°51′27″W

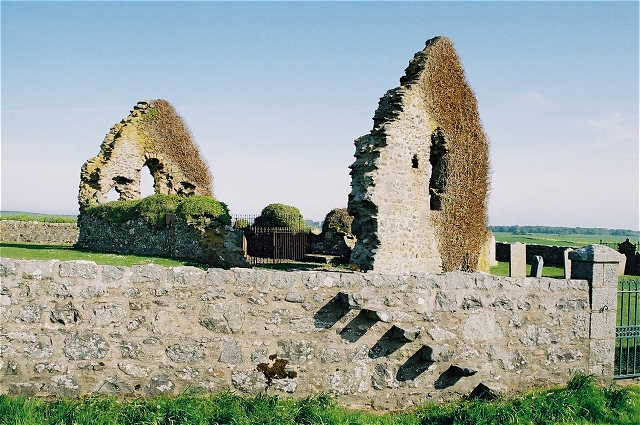
Ruins of St Mary's Chapel, Rattray

Rattray was a burgh on the coast of Buchan in Aberdeenshire, Scotland, near Rattray Head and the modern village of Crimond. It lay upon a natural harbour in the Loch of Strathbeg, which in former times was an inlet of the sea. Overlooking the harbour entrance was the Castle of Rattray, built by the Comyn family (earls of Buchan). The burgh may have been laid out by the Comyns in the 13th century. It was made a royal burgh by Mary, Queen of Scots in 1564. The harbour entrance began to silt up in the next century, however, and it was finally closed by a storm in 1720. This caused the burgh, which had never been much larger than a village, to enter a terminal decline. By 1732, "there was hardly a vestige of [it] remaining". All that survives of the burgh today is the ruined Chapel of St Mary and the motte of the old castle, now known as Castle Hill.
