= Loch of Strathbeg =

Loch in Aberdeenshire, Scotland

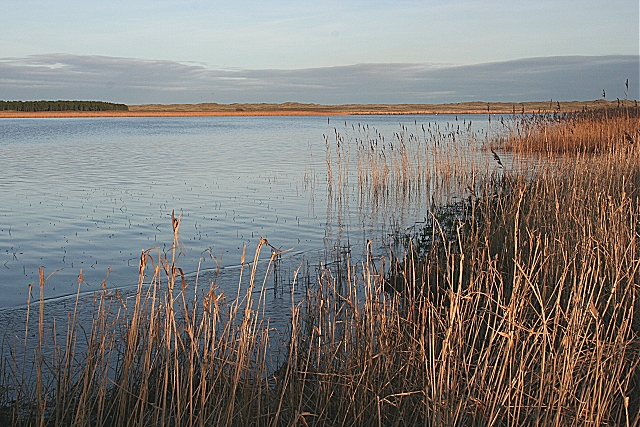
- Looking south-east across the loch

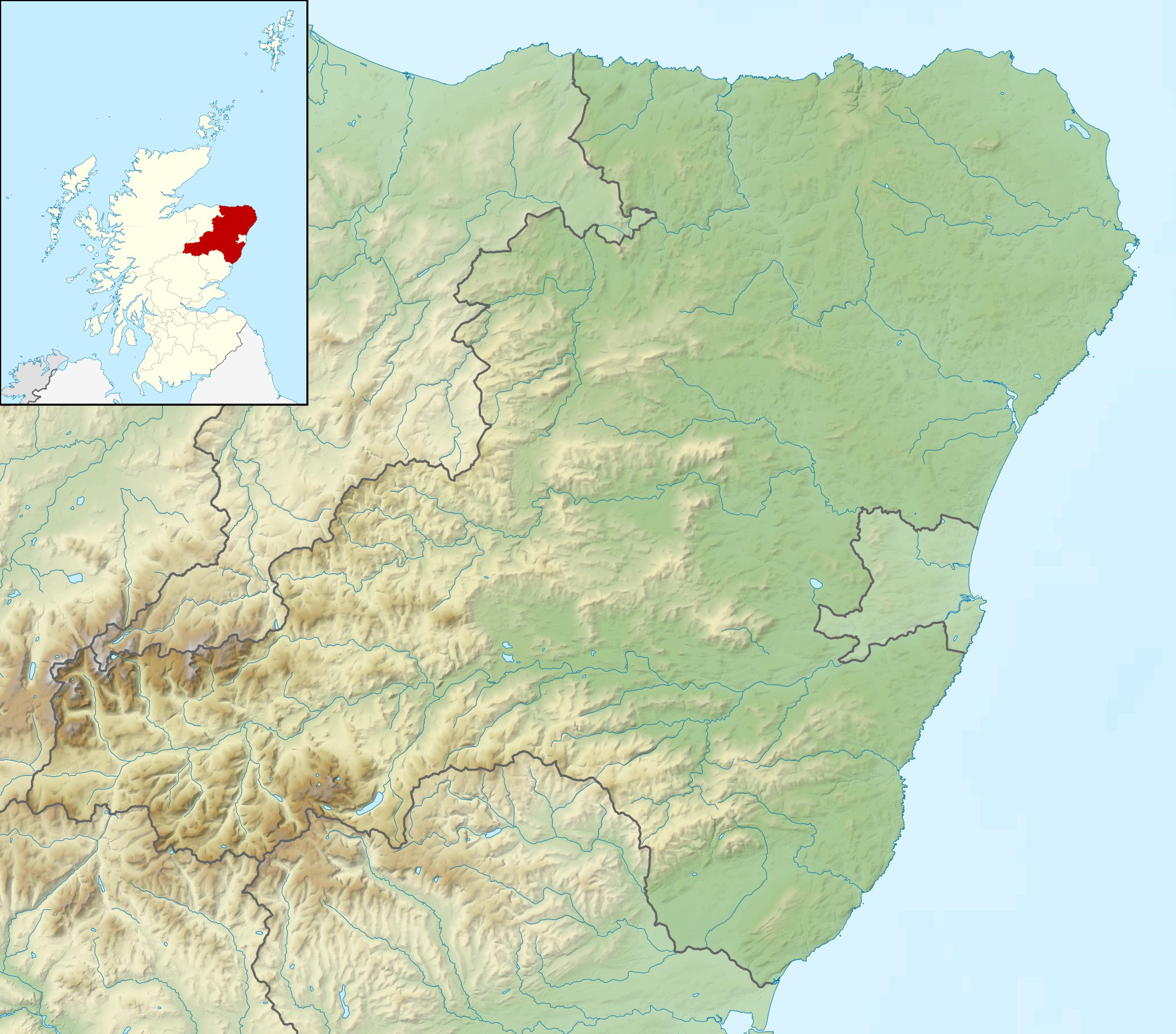
- Location within Aberdeenshire
- Location: Aberdeenshire, Scotland
- Coordinates: 57°37′11″N 1°52′37″W
- Primary inflows: Burn of Savoch
- Surface area: 220 hectares (540 acres)
- Max. depth: 2 metres (6.6 ft)

Ramsar Wetland
- Designated: 27 November 1995
- Reference no.: 778

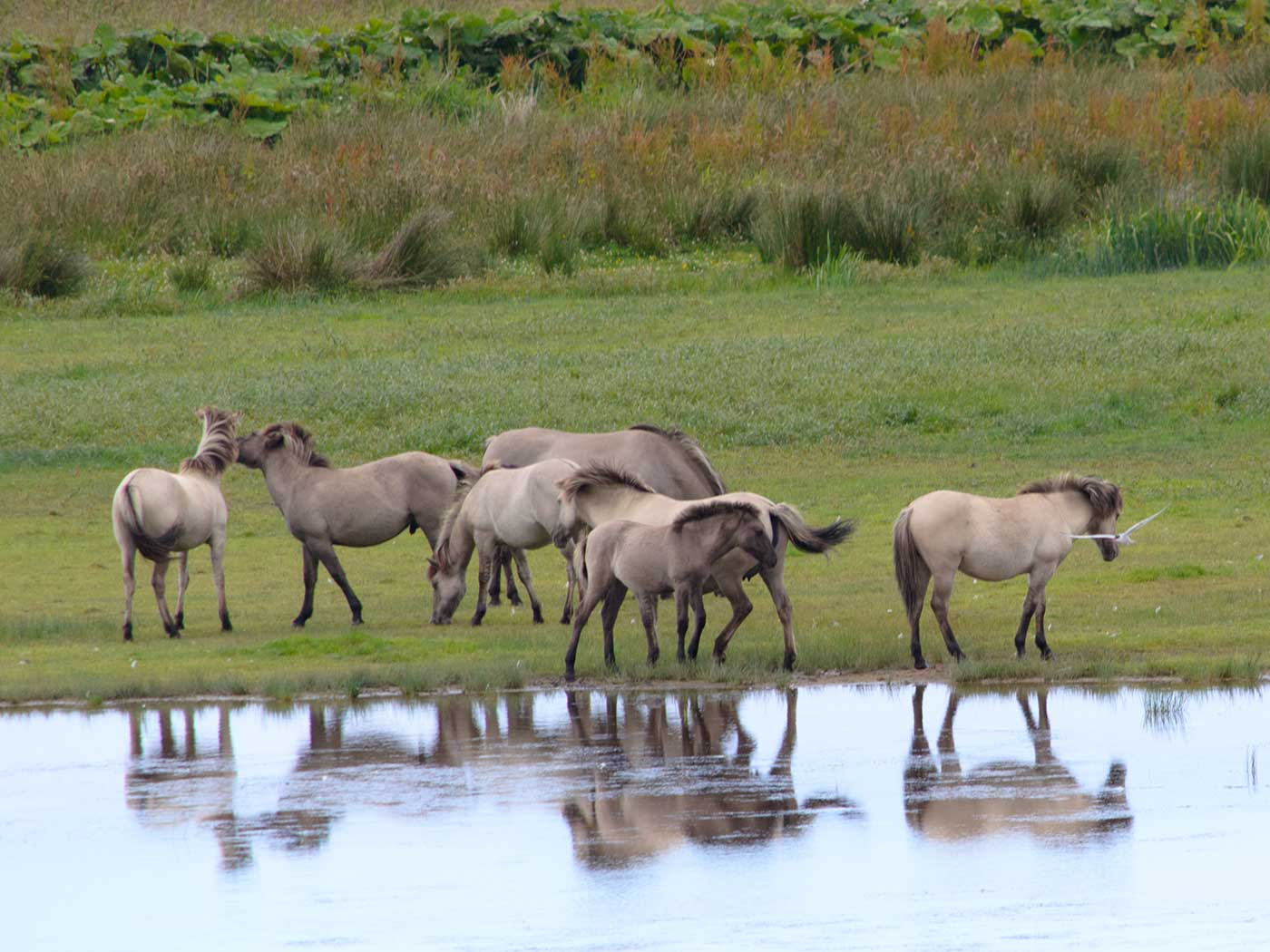
Free-roaming konik horses on the shore of the loch

The Loch of Strathbeg (Note: The name Strathbeg comes from Gaelic and means "small strath or valley". According to James Cumine of Rattray, writing in 1888, it referred originally to "a perfect little strath, about three quarters of a mile long, stretching from the Bridge of Savock at Crimonmogate to a steep bank at the west end of the Loch, called Stor-na-fin".) is a shallow freshwater loch on the coast of Buchan in Aberdeenshire, Scotland. It lies within the parishes of Lonmay and Crimond. The loch is a designated special protection area because of its importance to birdlife and is managed by the Royal Society for the Protection of Birds, which operates a visitor centre at Starnafin. It is visited in the winter months by at least 20,000 birds, including pink-footed geese, whooper swans, and teals.

== History ==
The Loch of Strathbeg was formerly an inlet of the sea, sheltered by a shingle bar. A channel at the east end of the bar gave access to the port of Rattray. This channel began to silt up in the 17th century, however, which proved fatal for the port. It was finally sealed by a storm around the year 1720. Writing in 1794, the minister of Crimond remarked:

At the beginning of the present century, this lake was of much smaller extent than it is now. It was confined to a small part of the E. end, and had a communication with the sea, so that vessels of small burthen could enter it. People born about the beginning of the century well remembered the first overflowing of the W. part of the loch, though the particular year is not now known, but it must have been about 1720. Previous to that time there was a hill of sand, between the hill above mentioned [Castle Hill] and the sea, and still higher than it. A furious E. wind blew away this hill of sand in one night, which stopped the communication between the loch and the sea by forming a sand bar. The low lying ground to the W. was soon overflowed, and the extent of the loch much increased.

Attempts were made in the 18th century to drain the loch, but these were doomed to end in failure. The ruined windmill on the shore of the loch and the drainage channel linking it to the sea are relics of this time.

During the First World War, the loch was used as a seaplane base. The disused aerodrome on its shore dates from the Second World War.
