= Fergus, Earl of Buchan =

Scottish noble

Fergus of Buchan was the last native Gaelic Mormaer of Buchan, and only the third to be known by name as Mormaer.

== Biography ==
Fergus appears to have had strong connections in Fife, and it is possible that his father (if he was his father) Colbán was a Fifer. A charter issued by Fergus appears to have survived. The charter is a feudal charter granting lands to a subordinate. The charter had a few witnesses with French names, presumably a phenomenon related to his Comyn connections. Fergus had no male heirs, and married his only daughter Marjory to William Comyn, bringing Gaelic control of the Mormaership to an end. On Fergus' death, Buchan became the first native Mormaerdom to pass into the hands of a foreign family.

He died sometime before 1214, possibly much earlier.

== Bibliography ==
- Roberts, John L., Lost Kingdoms: Celtic Scotland in the Middle Ages, (Edinburgh, 1997), pp. 55–6
- Young, Alan, "Buchan in the 13th century" in Alexander Grant & Keith J. Stringer (eds.) Medieval Scotland: Crown, Lordship and Community Essays Presented to G.W.S Barrow, (Edinburgh, 1993)

== See also ==
- Earl of Buchan

Preceded by Colbán	Mormaer of Buchan d. before 1214	Succeeded by Marjory of Buchan, m. William Comyn
