= Comhdhail =

Popular court in medieval Scotland

A comhdhail or couthal was a popular court in medieval Scotland. The word derives from Old Gaelic comdal, "tryst" or "assembly". Distinct from courts of the king, mormaers and senior barons, such courts were organized at a lower level of society, by peasant communities for themselves. It was probably similar to the English hundred or tithing court.

Although most of the details of how it functioned are lost, enough evidence of it exists to be sure of its importance. In 1329, Geoffrey, abbot of Arbroath, made an agreement with one of its senior tenants, Fergus mac Donnchaidh (Fergus son of Duncan). Abbot Geoffrey leased the land of Tulloes and Craichie (near Dunnichen) to Fergus, allowing him to introduce his own men. The agreement specified the abbot's legal rights, but allowed that "the aforesaid Fergus and his heir ... have the court which is called couthal for the men residing within the said land, to deal with the countless acts arising amongst themselves only, and they shall have the fines arising therefrom". Historian Geoffrey Barrow also noted that in a charter of 1317, by which Robert "janitor of Kincardine" granted Donnchadh Kymbdy burgess of Aberdeen land at Achichdonachy ("Donnchadh's field") cum curia et conthal, "with court and comhdhail".

Barrow further noted that Andrew of Wyntoun appears to have translated the Latin word lucos ("groves"), as kwthlys. Gavin Douglas' translation of Virgil used cythyll and cuthyll, implying that the word connoted a woodland clearing as well as an assembly.

Records of such assemblies are preserved in place-names. Over thirty modern place-names deriving from comhdhail survive in Ordnance Survey 1:50,000 maps, with a similar number recorded in pre-modern documentary sources, but now lost. Examples come almost entirely from eastern and lowland Scotland, stretching from Peeblesshire to Sutherland. Instances include various locations called "Cothill", "Cuttyhill", "Cuthill", and others like Glenquithle and Cuttieshillock.
