= Gille Críst, Earl of Mar =

Scottish mormaer of Mar from 1183 to 1203

Gille Críst
- Mormaer of Mar
- Reign: 1183–1203
- Predecessor: Morggán
- Successor: Donnchad
- Died: 1203
- Spouse: Orabilis
- Issue: Máel Coluim and Eoin

Gille Críst of Mar is the fourth-known mormaer of Mar, from 1183 to 1203.

His relationship to the previous mormaer, Morggán, is not totally clear, but Gille Críst was not the son of Morggán, and so his succession could probably be explained by operations of Gaelic succession, but scholars know almost nothing about the internal functions of Mar in this period.

He had two sons, Máel Coluim and Eoin. He also had a daughter, whose name is unknown. Her importance, though, is high, because she married Máel Coluim of Lundie, and their son Thomas Durward eventually contested the inheritance of Mar by the line of Morggán.

His wife was Orabilis, a daughter of Ness fitzWilliam, Lord of Leuchars. Her marriage to Gille was her third. She had previously been married to Robert de Quincy, Constable of Leinster, and, secondly, Adam, the son of Duncan I, Earl of Fife.

== Bibliography ==
- Oram, Richard D., "The Earls and Earldom of Mar, c1150-1300," Steve Boardman and Alasdair Ross (eds.) The Exercise of Power in Medieval Scotland, c.1200-1500, (Dublin/Portland, 2003), pp. 46–66

| Preceded by Morggán | Mormaer of Mar; 1183–1203 | Succeeded by Donnchad |
