= William Comyn, Lord of Badenoch =

Scottish Nobleman

William Comyn
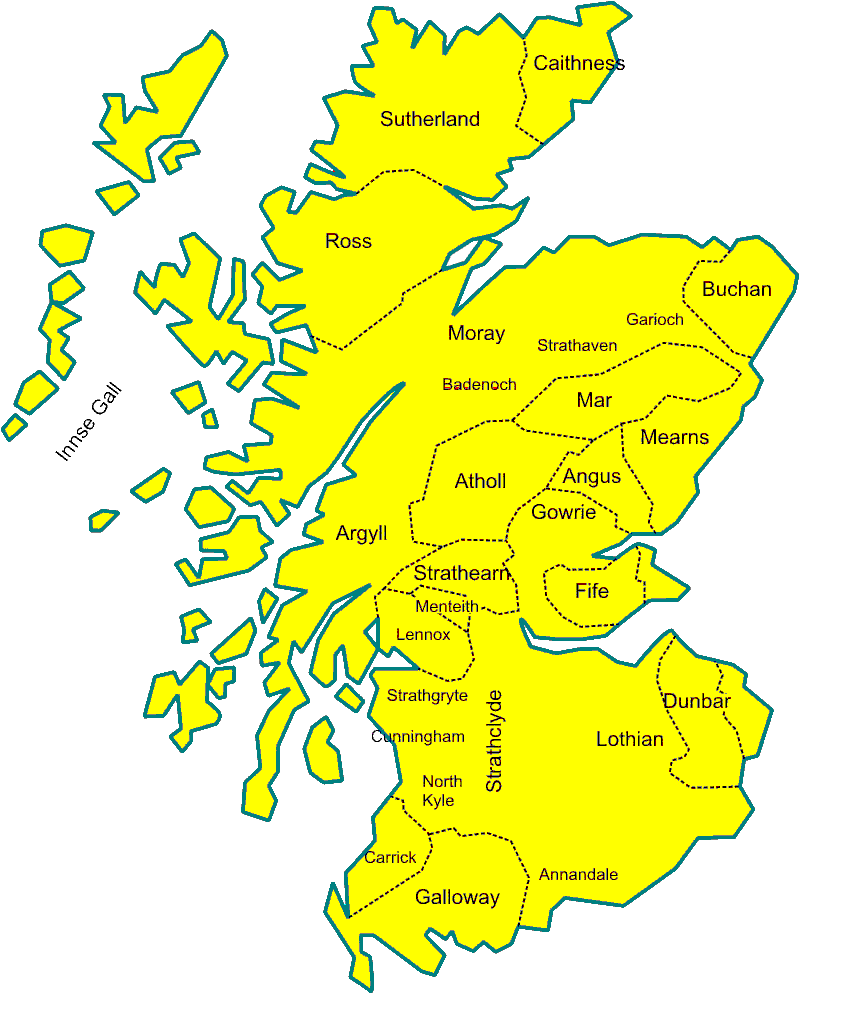
- Map of Scotland, showing the area of Buchan which Comyn ruled over, on the north-east coast, c. 1230

Sheriff of Forfar
- In office 1195–1211

Justiciar of Scotia
- In office 1205–1233
- Preceded by: Gille Brigte, Earl of Strathearn
- Succeeded by: Walter Stewart, 3rd High Steward of Scotland

Warden of Moray / Guardian of Moray
- In office 1211–1212

Personal details
- Born: c. 1163 Altyre, Moray
- Died: 1233 Buchan, Aberdeenshire
- Spouse(s): Sarah Fitzhugh (1193–1204); Marjory, Countess of Buchan (1212–death)
- Children: est. 13 (see family tree at bottom)
- Parent(s): Richard Comyn; Hextilda of Tynedale

William Comyn (1163 - 1233) was Lord of Badenoch and 1st Earl of Buchan. He was one of the seven children of Richard Comyn, Justiciar of Lothian, and wife Hextilda of Tynedale. Born in Altyre, Moray, Scotland, he died in Buchan and is buried in Deer Abbey.

William made his fortune in the service of King William I of Scotland fighting the Meic Uilleims in the north. William witnesses no fewer than 88 charters of the king. William was sheriff of Forfar (1195–1211), Justiciar of Scotia (1205–1233) and warden of Moray (1211–12). Between 1199 and 1200, William was sent to England to discuss important matters on King William's behalf with the new king, John.

William was appointed to the prestigious office of Justiciar of Scotia, the most senior royal office in the kingdom, in 1205. Between 1211 and 1212, William, as Warden of Moray (or Guardian of Moray) fought against the insurgency of Gofraid mac Domnaill (of the Meic Uilleim family), whom William beheaded in Kincardine in 1213. Upon finally destroying the Meic Uilleims in 1229, he was given the Lordship of Badenoch and the lands it controlled.

His younger son David married Isobel, the daughter of Roger de Valognes, becoming Lord of Kilbride which formed a third branch of the Comyn family.

William helped oversee the construction of St Mungo's Cathedral in Glasgow and after his death, Marjory continued his work there.

== Earl of Buchan ==
During his time as Warden of Moray, Comyn's success may have been a reason for his marriage to Marjory (a.k.a. Margaret), Countess of Buchan, sometime between 1209 and 1212. Her father, Fergus, Earl of Buchan (died c.1214), had no male heirs and so in marrying his daughter to William he ensured a suitable line for his titles before his death. Through this marriage, William took management of the mormaerdom (earldom) of Buchan.

== Deer Abbey ==
Founded in 1219 by Comyn as a Cistercian house, Deer Abbey, later a monastery, bringing "Cistercian monks from Kinloss Abbey near Elgin to establish the new monastery." After the Reformation of 1560 the abbey was secularized, becoming the barony or Altrie.

== Family tree ==
The marriage of William and Sarah Fitzhugh, William's first marriage, is believed to have produced six children. This marriage is associated with the Lordship of Badenoch. The marriage of William and Marjory, Countess of Buchan, produced seven children and is associated with the Earldom of Buchan. For the historian Alan Young, William's life, and particularly his marriage to the Countess of Buchan, marks the beginning of the "Comyn century".

NB. Children are ranked according to either accounts showing a specific rank in the order of Williams children's birth or according to the earliest available date the child was thought to have been born.

1. Father: Richard Comyn (b.c.1115–1123 d.c.1179);
2. Mother: Hextilda of Tynedale (a.k.a. Hextilda FitzUchtred or Hextilda FitzWaldeve) (b.1112–1122 d.c. 1149–1189). First married Malcolm, 2nd Earl of Atholl, making their son Henry, 3rd Earl of Atholl, William Comyn's half-brother.
  1. William
    - First marriage, 1193. Sarah Fitzhugh (a.k.a. Sarah filia Roberti) (b.1155–1160 d.c.1204).
      1. Richard (b.c.1190–1194 d.c.1244–1249). Marriage, name unknown, father of John I Comyn, Lord of Badenoch (b.c.1220 d.c.1277)
      2. Jardine Comyn, Lord of Inverallochy (b. during or before 1190)
      3. Walter, Lord of Badenoch (b.1190 d.c.1258). Married Isabella, Countess of Menteith
      4. Johanna (a.k.a. Jean) (b.c.1198 d.c.1274). Married c.1220, William I, Earl of Ross (a.k.a. William de Ross) (b.c.1194–1214 d.1274)
      5. John Comyn, jure uxoris Earl of Angus (died 1242). Married (c.1242) Matilda, Countess of Angus (aka. Maud) (b.c.1222, d.1261)
      6. David Comyn, Lord of Kilbride (died 1247). Married Isabel de Valoigne (d.1253)
    - Second marriage, c.1209–1212. Marjory (aka. Margaret), Countess of Buchan (a.k.a. Margaret Colhan of Buchan) (b.c.1184 d.c.1243–1244)
      1. Idonea (a.k.a. Idoine) (b.c.1215–1221). Married 1237 Gilbert de Haya of Erroll (a.k.a. Gilbert de la Hay) (d.1262)
      2. Alexander, Earl of Buchan (b.c.1217 d.c.1289–1290). Married Elizabetha de Quincy (a.k.a. Isabel) (b.1220 d.1282)
      3. William (b.c.1217)
      4. Margaret (b.c. 1218–1230). Married Sir John de Keith, Marischal of Scotland (b.1212 d.1270)
      5. Fergus, Lord of Gorgyn (b.c.1219–1228 d.). Married 1249, unknown wife.
        1. Margaret Comyn (b.c.1270)
      6. Elizabeth (b.c. 1223 d.1267). Married Uilleam, Earl of Mar (d.1281)
      7. Agnes (b.c.1225). Married 1262, Sir Philip de Meldrum, Justiciar of Scotia (a.k.a. Philip de Fedarg or Philip de Melgarum)

== Death ==
Comyn died in 1233 in Aberdeenshire, Scotland and was buried in the new church at Deer Abbey.

== Notes ==
Peerage of Scotland
New title	Lord of Badenoch; 1229–1233	Succeeded by Walter Comyn
Legal offices
Preceded by Duncan II of Fife as last known holder	Justiciar of Scotia; 1205–1233	Succeeded by Walter Stewart
