= Malise IV, Earl of Strathearn =

Scottish noble (died c. 1329)

Coat of arms of the Earls of Strathearn

Malise IV of Strathearn (Gaelic: Maol Íosa; died c. 1329) was a Scottish nobleman, the seventh known ruler of Strathearn.

== Biography ==
He was an ardent supporter of King Robert the Bruce, in contrast to his father, Malise III, who sided with Edward I of England.

He is first recorded in January 1306, when he and his mother petitioned King Edward to release his father, who had been mistakenly imprisoned. In 1309 he is noted as having received gifts of money and wine from Edward; nevertheless, he joined King Robert's side, and fought with him at the siege of Perth Castle in 1312, while his father fought for the English defenders. On the fall of the castle, the elder Malise was captured by his son, who then took control of the earldom of Strathearn.

Little more is known of him, as his name does not often appear on record. He was one of the earls who signed the Declaration of Arbroath in 1320, and married at least twice. Though the identity of his first wife is not known, we know that by her he had a son and a daughter: Malise, who succeeded his father as eighth Earl, and Mary or Maria, who married John de Moray of Drumsargard. His second wife, whom he married around 1323, was Jean or Joanna, daughter of Sir John Menteith of Ruskie. They had no issue. After the Earl's death around 1329, the Dowager Countess would go on to marry three more times. Her third husband, Maurice Murray, was granted the earldom of Strathearn after it was lost by the eighth Earl.

== Ancestry ==
Ancestors of Malise IV, Earl of Strathearn

16. Gille Brigte, Earl of Strathearn
8. Robert, Earl of Strathearn
17. Matilda D'Aubigny
4. Malise II, Earl of Strathearn
2. Malise III, Earl of Strathearn
20. Magnus, Earl of Orkney and Caithness
10. Gilbert / Gille Brigte, Earl of Orkney and Caithness
5. Matilda
1. Malise IV, Earl of Strathearn
24. Richard Comyn
12. William Comyn
25. Hextilda
6. Alexander, Earl of Buchan
26. Fergus, Earl of Buchan
13. Marjory, Countess of Buchan
3. Agnes Comyn
28. Saer, Earl of Winchester
14. Roger, Earl of Winchester
29. Margaret de Beaumont
7. Elizabeth Quincy
30. Alan, Lord of Galloway
15. Helen of Galloway

== Bibliography ==
- The Scots Peerage, ed. James Balfour Paul, Vol VIII (Edinburgh: David Douglas, 1911), pp. 251–2
- Neville, Cynthia J., Native Lordship in Medieval Scotland: The Earldoms of Strathearn and Lennox, c. 1140-1365, (Portland & Dublin, 2005)

Preceded by Malise III	Earl of Strathearn; 1317–1329	Succeeded by Malise V
