= Malise V, Earl of Strathearn =

Malise V
- Malise V, Earl of Strathearn and Caithness, Jarl of Orkney
- Tenure: 1330–1334
- Other names: Maol Íosa
- Known for: Last of the native Gaelic Earls of Strathearn.
- Died: c. 1357
- Spouses: unknown Marjory of Ross
- Issue: Four daughters
- Parents: Malise IV, Earl of Strathearn

Coat of arms of the Earls of Strathearn

Malise V, Earl of Strathearn and Caithness, Jarl of Orkney (Scottish Gaelic: Maol Íosa; died c. 1357) was the last of the native Gaelic Earls of Strathearn.

== Biography ==
He succeeded to the Earldom of Strathearn in 1329, on the death of his father Malise IV, Earl of Strathearn.

After the death of Magnus, Earl of Orkney, he inherited the Norwegian Jarldom of Orkney (including Caithness) in right of his great-great-grandfather Earl Gilbert. Despite the similarity of title, and related etymology, a Norwegian jarl is not the same as a Scottish earl; the position of jarl of Orkney was the most senior rank in mediaeval Norway except for the king himself.

In 1330, King Edward III of England wrote to King David II of Scotland and his councillors, including Malise, requesting that certain forfeited noblemen have their lands restored. This request was evaded, if not outright refused, and consequently Edward allowed Edward Balliol to march into Scotland with the dispossessed knights. Malise took an active part in opposing the invaders, commanding the third division of the Scots army at the Battle of Halidon Hill, and was referred to as a "notorious rebel" by Edward III. He had his earldom forfeited by Balliol, who bestowed it on John de Warenne, Earl of Surrey. Malise made strenuous efforts to recover Strathearn, but without success, and he went to dwell on his estates in Caithness.

By 1340 the influence of Balliol and Edward III had waned, but Malise still did not get back his earldom. During King David's absence in France, he was arraigned before the High Steward and accused of felony and treason, in that he had supposedly resigned the earldom of his own free will by reason of a contract between him and the Earl of Surrey. The jury acquitted him, but the earldom remained in David's hands, who in 1344 bestowed it on Malise's nephew Maurice de Moravia.

In 1344 he was summoned before King and Parliament on the same charge. He did not attend in person, but was represented by his brother-in-law William III, Earl of Ross, along with the Bishop of Ross and a lawyer named William Meldrum. He pleaded that he had already been found innocent; this was partly acknowledged by Parliament, though they judged that the earldom should continue to be held by the King.

After this, Earl Malise passes from history; his date of death is not known. Barbara E. Crawford has suggested that he may have died of the plague.

== Marriage and children ==
He is said to have been married twice, his first wife being a daughter of the Earl of Menteith, though no evidence has been found of her existence. His second wife was Marjory of Ross, daughter of Hugh, Earl of Ross, by his first wife Matilda (Maud) de Brus, sister of Robert the Bruce, whom he probably married between 1325 and 1328. By her he had four daughters:

- Matilda, married Wayland de l'Ard. Her son Alexander de l'Ard, was made Captain of Orkney in 1375, by the Norwegian king. This was a probationary position, and if passed, Alexander would have been made Jarl the following year; however, he was uninterested in the role, and was soon sacked. Alexander sold his lands in Caithness to Robert II of Scotland; he is sometimes referred to as Earl of Caithness as a result.
- Isabella/Isabel, married Sir William St Clair, 8th Baron of Roslin. Their only son Henry was made Jarl of Orkney in 1379
- Agneta, married Erengisle Sunesson, who was briefly Jarl of Orkney
- An unknown daughter, who married Guttorm Sperra

== Ancestry ==
Ancestors of Malise V, Earl of Strathearn

16. Robert, Earl of Strathearn
8. Malise II, Earl of Strathearn
4. Malise III, Earl of Strathearn
18. Gilbert / Gille Brigte, Earl of Orkney and Caithness
9. Matilda
2. Malise IV, Earl of Strathearn
20. William Comyn
10. Alexander, Earl of Buchan
21. Marjory, Countess of Buchan
5. Agnes Comyn
22. Roger, Earl of Winchester
11. Elizabeth Quincy
23. Helen of Galloway
1. Malise V, Earl of Strathearn
3. Unknown

Preceded by Malise IV	Earl of Strathearn; 1330–1334	Succeeded by Forfeit; to Maurice de Moravia
Preceded by Magnus	Jarl of Orkney; 1331–1350	Succeeded by Erengisle
