= John de Menteith =

Scottish nobleman

John de Mentieth
- Coat of arms

Personal details
- Born: c.1274
- Died: c.1329

Sir John Menteith of Ruskie and Knapdale (c. 1275 – c. 1329) was a Scottish nobleman during the Wars of Scottish Independence. He is known for his capture of Sir William Wallace in 1305 and later joined with King Robert the Bruce and received large land grants in Knapdale and Kintyre for his service. He is described as "guardian" of the Earldom of Menteith, as his great-nephew Alan II, Earl of Menteith was a child at the time of the death of Alan I, Earl of Menteith.

== Life ==
John was the younger son of Mary I, Countess of Menteith, the daughter of Muireadhach II, Earl of Menteith, and Walter Bailloch Stewart. John possessed the land of Ruskie in Stirlingshire. John was a party to the Turnberry Bond with his father, Walter Stewart and the Bruces, which was signed at Turnberry Castle on 20 September 1286.

With his older brother Alexander, John was involved in the resistance against King Edward I of England and were both captured after the Battle of Dunbar on 27 April 1296. While Alexander was released after swearing fealty, John remained a prisoner at Nottingham Castle in England until August 1297, when Edward released John from prison, on his taking oath and giving security to serve with the king in the campaign of 1297 in Flanders.

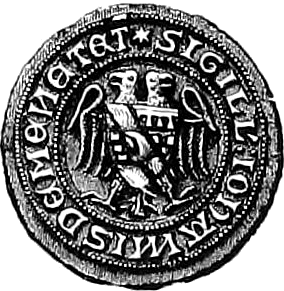
Seal of John de Monteith (c.1297)

He was appointed the Constable of Lennox and was ravaging the lands of Edward's partisans in Lennox in 1301. John was sent in 1303 to negotiate peace with the English, but refrained from pressing his mission. By 1303 John submitted and had been restored to Edward's favour, for on 20 March 1304 John was appointed Warden of the castle, town, and sheriffdom of Dumbarton. Edward was keen to secure the fortification as a major access route into Scotland by sea.

As sheriff of Dumbarton, in August 1305 John is alleged to have conspired with Aymer de Valence, 2nd Earl of Pembroke and Robert Clifford, 1st Baron Clifford, at the Parish Church in Rutherglen in Lanarkshire, to capture Sir William Wallace and have him handed over to the Captain of Scotland, below the Forth, John Segrave, 2nd Baron Segrave., a service for which he was to be rewarded with land, and titles. For this John was labelled traitorous and was given the contemporary nickname Fause Menteith ("Menteith the treacherous, false").

The little gargoyle head of the Fause Menteith on the 16th-century guard house at Dumbarton Castle

Wyntoun, whose Metrical Chronicle was written in 1418, says:

Schyre Jhon of Menteith in tha days
Tuk in Glasgow William Walays;
And sent hym until Ingland sune,
There was he quartayrd and undone.

The English chronicler Piers Langtoft states that Menteith discovered the retreat of Wallace through the treacherous information of Jack Short, Wallace's servant, and that he came under cover of night and seized him in bed. A passage in the Scalachronica, quoted by John Leland, notes, "William Walleys was taken of the Counte of Menteith, about Glasgow, and sent to King Edward, and after was hanged, drawn, and quartered at London."

Menteith was nominated one of the representatives of the Scots barons in the parliament of both nations which assembled at London in September 1305 and was chosen upon the Scottish council, which was appointed to assist John of Brittany, the new Guardian of Scotland, in the English interest. John received on 1 June 1306 from Edward the Earldom of Lennox, while on 15 June he received the Warden of the castle, town, and sheriffdom of Dumbarton office for life. John returned to Scotland in October.

Edward appealed to John in December 1307 to join him in resisting the revolt by Robert the Bruce, however John abandoned his earldom of Lennox, joining Bruce's side. Bruce rewarded John with large grants in Knapdale and Kintyre. In March 1308, John was among the Scottish magnates who wrote to the King Philip IV of France on behalf of the nation and in 1309, he was sent with Sir Nigel Campbell to treat with Richard de Burgh, Earl of Ulster, receiving a safe-conduct on 21 August, from King Edward II of England. John's English lands were forfeited for his treason. In 1316 he was commissioned with Thomas Randolph, Earl of Moray to treat on behalf of Bruce for a truce with the English. John remained closely attached to the royal court, as is shown by the numerous charters he attested and was at the Arbroath parliament in April 1320, and signed the Declaration of Arbroath sent by the barons of Scotland to Pope John XXII.

John was one of the negotiators of the thirteen years' truce between Bruce and the English, signed on 30 May 1323 and was present at a Scottish council at Berwick-upon-Tweed in June. The last recorded grants to him are in 1329, during the minority of King David II of Scotland.

== Issue ==
Menteith, by an unknown spouse, had issue:

- Sir John de Menteith the younger, married Helen daughter of Gartnait, Earl of Mar
- Walter Menteith
- Johanna Menteith, married (1) Malise, 7th Earl of Strathearn, (2) John Campbell, Earl of Atholl, (3) Maurice de Moravia, Earl of Strathearn, (4) William de Moravia, 5th Earl of Sutherland
