= Duke of Strathearn =

The title Duke of Strathearn has never existed, but there have been three dukedoms with "Strathearn" in the title:

- Duke of Cumberland and Strathearn
- Duke of Kent and Strathearn
- Duke of Connaught and Strathearn

Strathearn is an area in Perthshire central Scotland. The river Earn which runs through the heart of the strath and is a tributary to the river Tay.

William, Prince of Wales, first-in-line to the throne of the United Kingdom, was created Duke of Cambridge and Earl of Strathearn on his wedding day.
