= Ferteth, Earl of Strathearn =

Scottish earl

Coat of arms of the Earls of Strathearn

Ferteth of Strathearn (fl. 1160), sometimes referred to as Ferchar or Ferquhard, is the second-known earl or mormaer of Strathearn, a region in central Scotland.

== Biography ==
Ferteth was the son of his predecessor Malise I, and wife Rosabella of Forteith. His name likely derives from the Gaelic Fer Téid, "Teith Man". He first appears in history in 1160, when he came to the Parliament at Perth. On this occasion he, with the help of five other earls, besieged King Malcolm in Perth Castle. The reason for this is not clear, but it may have been a protest against Malcolm's friendship with Henry II of England, which they believed might lead to Scotland becoming an English vassal. The king and the earls were later reconciled, and Earl Ferteth was not punished for his actions.

Ferteth took a great interest in ecclesiastical affairs, and it was largely due to his influence that Strathearn was made a separate diocese, headed by the Bishops of Dunblane. He died in 1171, having married a woman named Ethen, of unknown parentage. Ferteth and Ethen had two sons and a daughter:

- Gille-Brigte (Gilbert)
- Malise, who held Muthil, Ogilvy, Kincardine, Rossie and other lands in Perthshire, and married Ada, illegitimate daughter of David, Earl of Huntingdon
- Christian, who married Sir Walter Olifard, Justiciar of Lothian and son of Sir David Olifard.

== Bibliography ==
- Anderson, Rev'd John, "The Ancient Earls of Strathearn", in Sir James Balfour Paul (ed.) The Scots Peerage, Volume VIII, (Edinburgh, 1911), pp. 240-1
- Neville, Cynthia J., Native Lordship in Medieval Scotland: The Earldoms of Strathearn and Lennox, c. 1140–1365, (Portland & Dublin, 2005)

Preceded by Malise	Earl of Strathearn fl. 1160	Succeeded by Gilbert
