= David Wemyss =

David Wemyss may refer to:

- David Wemyss (died 1332), Scottish noble
- David Wemyss, 2nd Earl of Wemyss (1610–1679), army officer
- David Wemyss, 4th Earl of Wemyss (1678–1720), Scottish peer and Member of Parliament
- David Wemyss, Lord Elcho (1721–1787), Scottish peer and Jacobite army officer
- David Douglas Wemyss (1760–1839), British Army officer
