= Muireadhach III, Earl of Menteith =

Muireadhach III, Earl of Menteith (died 11 August 1332) was a Scottish nobleman.

== Life ==
He was the third son of Alexander, Earl of Menteith. Like his father and brothers, his surname was "Menteith" rather than Stewart, even though he could claim agnatic descent from the Stewarts. He was the third Earl or Mormaer of Menteith to bear the name "Muireadhach", which occurs in non Gaelic sources in various corrupt forms, such as Muretach, Murdoc, Murdoch, Murdach, Murdo and even Maurice.

He was an uncle of the previous earl, and a nephew of John de Menteith, an important figure during the Wars of Scottish Independence most famous for handing William Wallace over to the English crown.

He is first referred to in 1311 as a valet in the service of William Ferrers, 1st Baron Ferrers of Groby in England. He was knighted in early 1317–1318, when he is referred to as "Sir Murdac de Mentethe" in a charter. Menteith returned to Scotland by 1318 where he witnessed a charter of Robert the Bruce as Earl.

Menteith is alleged to have uncovered the plot of William de Soules and others to depose the Scots King, and in return was granted lands of those then declared forfeit.

He was killed at the Battle of Dupplin Moor.

== Notes ==
| Preceded by Alan II | Mormaer/Earl of Menteith (d. 1332) | Succeeded by Mary |
