= John Campbell, Earl of Atholl =

Scottish nobleman

John Campbell, Earl of Atholl (died 1333) was a Scottish nobleman.

== Background ==
John, also known as Iain, was the son of Sir Neil Campbell by his wife Mary Bruce. His grandparents were Sir Cailean Mór Campbell, Afraig of Carrick, Robert de Brus, 6th Lord of Annandale and Marjorie, Countess of Carrick. In 1316, he inherited from his father the lands confiscated from David Strathbogie, and in about 1320 he was created Earl of Atholl, though Strathbogie's son also claimed the title.

He was married to Joan, former wife of Malise IV, Earl of Strathearn and daughter of Sir John de Menteith. Her paternal grandparents were Walter Bailloch and Mary I, Countess of Menteith. They had no children, so when he was killed at Halidon Hill on 19 July 1333 (one of five Scottish earls to die in the battle), his earldom became extinct. David III Strathbogie, a disinherited noble, thus claimed the Earldom of Atholl outright.

His widow Johanna Menteith, daughter of the infamous John de Menteith, later married Maurice de Moravia, Earl of Strathearn and then William de Moravia, 5th Earl of Sutherland.
