= Malise III, Earl of Strathearn =

Coat of arms of the Earls of Strathearn

Malise III of Strathearn (Gaelic: Maol Íosa; c. 1257 – 1312) was a Scottish nobleman, the ruler of the region of Strathearn.

== Biography ==
He was the son of Malise II and his second wife Matilda, daughter of Gilbert, Earl of Orkney and Caithness. He succeeded his father on the latter's death in 1271, though for some reason he does not refer to himself as Earl until 1283, perhaps because he had not been formally infeft in the earldom.

Malise helped to keep the Kingdom of Scotland stable after the death of King Alexander, and in an example of his behaviour, he is recorded as levying the tenants of the land belonging to Inchaffray Abbey to help preserve the peace. In 1284 he had joined with other Scottish noblemen who acknowledged Margaret, Maid of Norway as the heir to Alexander.

In the interregnum following Margaret's death, Malise took a prominent part in state affairs, and was involved in most of the political events of the time. Perhaps because of his marriage into the House of Comyn, he took the side of John Balliol in his competition for the throne with Robert Bruce, and accompanied John at the Battle of Dunbar in 1296. Later he swore fealty to Edward I of England, and two of his sons were taken as hostages by that king, to ensure their father's good behaviour.

In 1297 he took the Earl of Fife's uncle as a prisoner for King Edward, along with his two sons. A close friend of the Prince of Wales (later King Edward II), he was invested in 1305 as Lieutenant of the Warden north of the Forth.

In 1306 he was ordered to take the sons of the Steward of Scotland and the Earl of Atholl as hostages, but before he could complete this task, he was imprisoned in Rochester Castle because of his alleged surrender to King Robert Bruce. According to Malise, King Robert and the Earl of Atholl had marched into Strathearn and deceived and coerced him into paying Robert homage. Notwithstanding this explanation, he remained imprisoned. On petition from the Earl's wife and sons, King Edward ordered an inquiry to be made, but nothing came of this. After having been transferred to York in 1307, he was finally acquitted and set free in 1310.

Malise was present on the English side when King Robert stormed Perth Castle in 1312. He died later the same year, and was entombed in Inchaffray Abbey, to the right of the high altar.

== Marriage and issue ==
The Earl married a lady named Agnes Egidia Comyn, the second daughter of Alexander Comyn, Earl of Buchan, and wife Elizabeth (or Isabel or Isabella) de Quincy. The Countess Agnes would later be imprisoned for life for conspiring against King Robert with her nephew William Soules. Malise and Agnes had three sons and one daughter:

- Malise IV, succeeded as Earl
- Gilbert, went with King Edward to Flanders in 1297, and may have died or been killed there
- Robert, is recorded as having been imprisoned in the Tower of London with other Scottish youths in 1297. Nothing further is known of him
- Matilda, married Robert de Toeni, Lord Toeni of Flamsted (1276–1309), son of Ralph de Toeni.

Preceded by Malise II	Mormaer of Strathearn; 1271–1317	Succeeded by Malise IV
