= John Graham, Earl of Menteith =

Scottish nobleman (died 1347)

John Graham, Earl of Menteith (died 28 February 1347) was a Scottish nobleman. Graham became Earl of Menteith by courtesy of his wife, Mary Menteith, Countess of Menteith in her own right, daughter of Alan Menteith, 7th Earl of Menteith.

== Life ==
John was a son of John de Graham and Marjory Halliday.

He accompanied David II in his invasion of England in 1346. He was present at the battle of Neville's Cross and, when the archers were almost within bowshot, earnestly urged the King to send a body of cavalry to charge them in flank. His advice was unhappily disregarded and when the archers were about to direct their deadly volleys on the serried ranks of the Scottish spearmen, the Earl exclaimed, 'Give me but a hundred horse and I engage to disperse them all; so shall we be able to fight more securely.'

His appeal was, however, unheeded and hastily leaping upon his horse, and followed only by his own retainers, he rushed upon the advancing bowmen but his gallant attack was not supported.

His horse was killed under him and after bravely, but vainly, striving to arrest the advance of the enemy, he was compelled to retire to the main body of the Scottish army. After a stout battle, which lasted for three hours, the Earl was taken prisoner, along with his sovereign, and was imprisoned in the Tower of London.

By the direct orders of the English King, Edward III, he was tried and condemned as a traitor, on the plea that he had at one time sworn fealty to the English King, and was drawn, hanged, beheaded and quartered. This is mentioned in Bernard Cornwell's novel, Vagabond.

== Marriage and issue ==
By his wife the countess of Menteith, Graham had issue:

- Margaret Graham, Countess of Menteith
