= Gille Brigte, Earl of Strathearn =

Scottish earl (1150–1223)

Gille Brigte
- Earl of Strathearn
- Reign: 1171–1223
- Predecessor: Ferteth
- Successor: Robert
- Born: 1150
- Died: 1223 (aged 72–73)
- Spouses: Matilda d'Aubigny; Ysenda
- Issue: 10
- Father: Ferteth, Earl of Strathearn
- Mother: Ethen

Coat of arms of the Earls of Strathearn

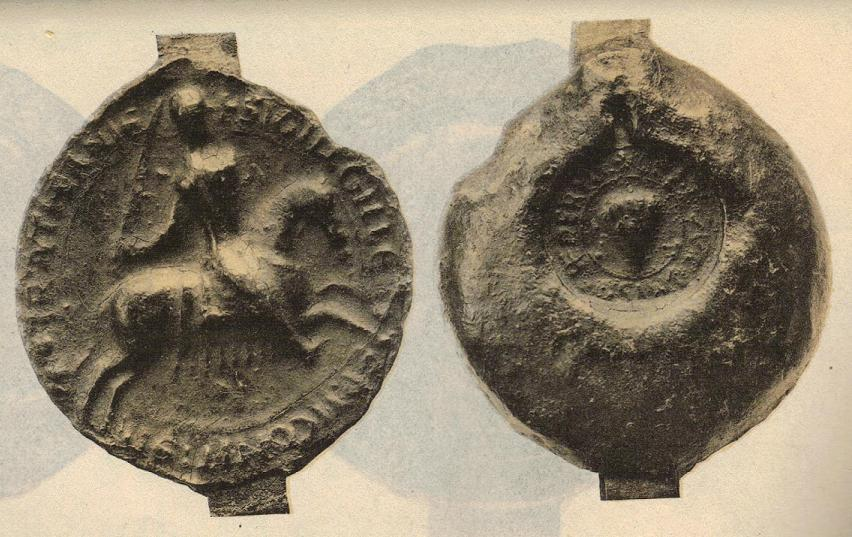
The second seal of Gille Brigte, from a charter to the Abbey of Inchaffray

Gille Brigte of Strathearn (1150–1223), sometimes also called Gilbert, was the 3rd Earl or Mormaer of Strathearn.

== Biography ==
He was the son of Ferteth, Earl of Strathearn and his wife Ethen, and first appears on record in 1164, as a witness to a charter by King William to the monks of Scone. He succeeded his father in 1171, and around this time was made Justiciar of Scotia, the highest legal official in the realm.

He does not seem to have taken a large role in public affairs, and does not often occur in public records. A number of royal charters do exist, granting him certain lands in Perthshire. He was more active in ecclesiastical affairs. He took an interest in the newly founded Abbey of Lindores, and in 1200 he and his wife founded an abbey at Inchaffray, dedicated to the memory of their eldest son Gille Críst, who had died two years previously. He was also a benefactor to Dunblane Cathedral.

Gille Brigte (Gilbert) died in 1223, perhaps in his 70s, a very long life for the period, a testimony to his comparatively peaceful career.

== Marriage and issue ==
Gille Brigte married twice. His first wife was Matilda D;Aubigny, daughter of William d'Aubigny. His second wife was Ysenda, a lady who held lands in Abercairny and had two brothers, Sir Richard and Galfric of Gask. By his first wife Matilda, he had seven sons and three daughters:

- Gille Críst, held the lands of Kinveachy and Glencarnie, died 5 October 1198
- William, died c. 1208
- Ferchar, died c. 1208
- Robert, 1176–1245, succeeded his father as the 4th Earl of Strathearn
- Fergus, held the lands of Auchtermuchty, died c. 1247
- Malise (Máel ĺsu), held the lands of Rossie. His wife is not known, but he had two sons, Malise and Nicholas.
- Gille Brigte/Gilbert of Glencarnie, held the lands of Glencarnie, and had a son of the same name. His line ended in an heiress, Matilda, who was the mother of Duncan (Donnchad) Grant of Freuchie, ancestors of the Earls of Seafield
- Matilda or Maud, married Malcolm (Máel Coluim), who became Earl of Fife
- Cecilia, married Walter Ruthven, ancestor of the Earls of Gowrie
- Eithne, married David de la Hay, 7th Earl of Erroll, ancestor of the Earls of Erroll

== Sources ==
- Neville, Cynthia J. (2002). "Native Lords and the Church in Thirteenth-Century Strathearn, Scotland". The Journal of Ecclesiastical History. 53 (3 (July)). Cambridge University Press.
- Neville, Cynthia J., Native Lordship in Medieval Scotland: The Earldoms of Strathearn and Lennox, c. 1140–1365 (Portland & Dublin, 2005).
- The Scots Peerage, ed. James Balfour Paul, Vol VIII (Edinburgh: David Douglas, 1911), pp. 241–4

Regnal titles
Preceded by Ferteth	Earl of Strathearn; 1171–1223	Succeeded by Robert
Legal offices
Preceded by Donnchad II, Earl of Fife	Justiciar of Scotia; 1172–1199 with Donnchad II, Earl of Fife (c. 1172–1199); Matthew, Bishop of Aberdeen (c. 1172–1199)	Succeeded by Donnchad II, Earl of Fife
