= Malise I, Earl of Strathearn =

Coat of arms of the Earls of Strathearn

Malise (Gaelic: Maol Íosa; fl. 1099–1141) is the earliest-known earl, or mormaer, of Strathearn in central Scotland.

== Biography ==
In 1138, Malise participated in King David's invasion of England, and he fought in the vanguard at the Battle of the Standard. Like his son and successor Ferquhard, Malise is largely absent from the witness lists of Scottish royal charters, indicating a lack of involvement in royal government. He was, however, a witness to a charter of David, confirming certain gifts and grants to Dunfermline Abbey, dated about 1128.

Aelred of Rievaulx portrays Malise as the chief representative of the native Scottish faction at the royal court, opposed to the faction of Normans led by Robert de Brus.

He married Rosabella of Forteith, by whom he had his son Ferteth, his only known issue.

== Bibliography ==
- Neville, Cynthia J., Native Lordship in Medieval Scotland: The Earldoms of Strathearn and Lennox, c. 1140-1365 (Portland & Dublin, 2005)

| Preceded by ? | Earl of Strathearn fl. 1138 | Succeeded by Ferquhard |
