= Earl of Menteith =

Ruler of the province of Menteith

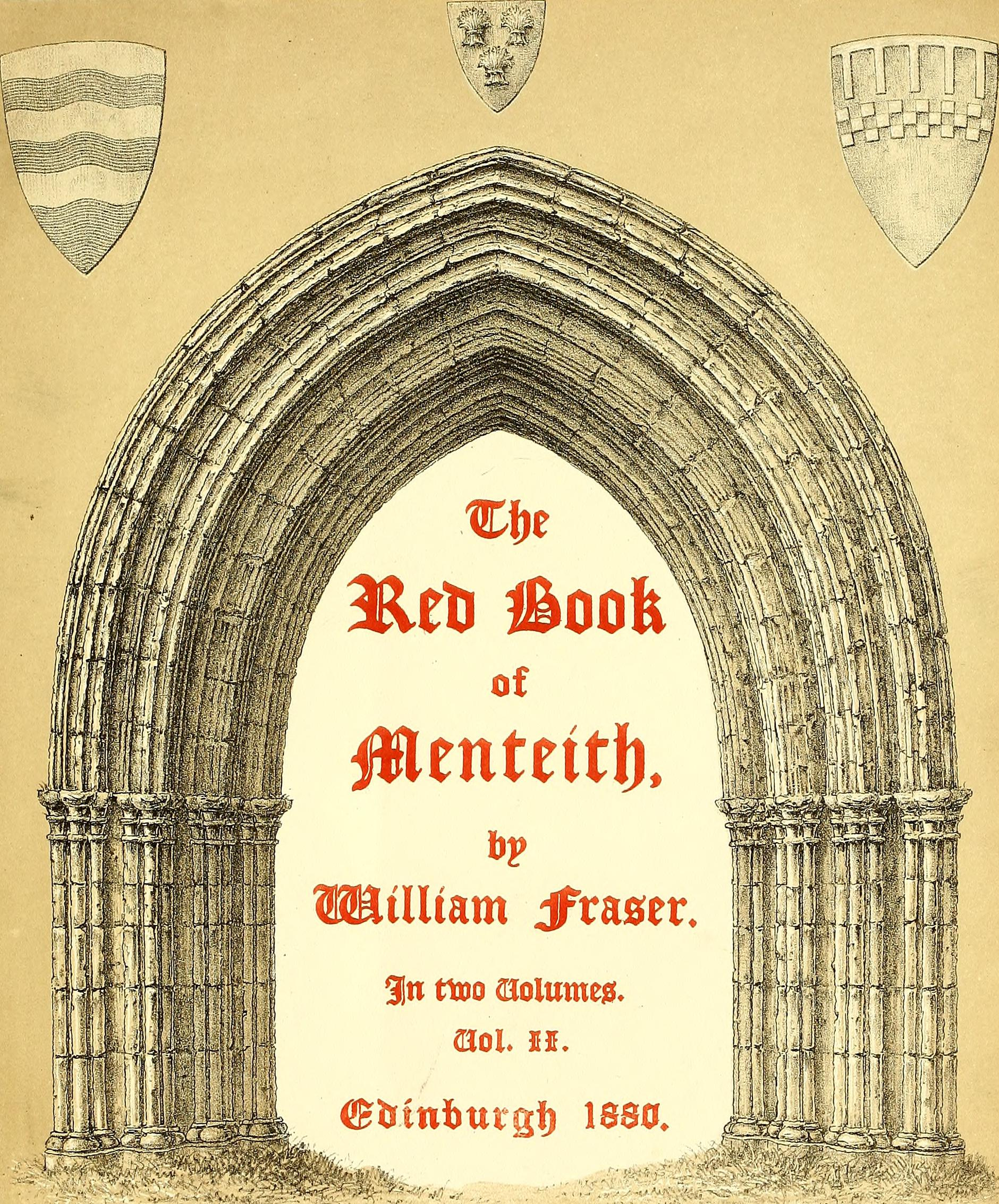
Arms of the earls, from left to right: arms of Muireadhach I, Earl of Menteith (d. 1213), the Earl at the start of the age of heraldry (c.1200-1215); Walter Comyn (jure uxoris Earl): Azure, three garbs or; Stewart of Menteith

Arms of Muireadhach I, Earl of Menteith (d. 1213), the Earl at the start of the age of heraldry (c.1200-1215): Barry wavy of six or and gules

Arms of Stewart of Menteith: Or, a fess chequy azure and argent, over all a label of five points gules in chief

The Mormaer or Earl of Menteith was the ruler of the province of Menteith in the Middle Ages. The first mormaer is usually regarded as Gille Críst (or Gilchrist), simply because he is the earliest on record. The title was held in a continuous line from Gille Críst until Muireadhach IV (a.k.a. Murdoch Stewart, Duke of Albany), although the male line was broken on two occasions. A truncated version of the earldom was given two years later to Malise Graham, 1st Earl of Menteith, in compensation for loss of the Earldom of Strathearn, which was a likely result of the execution of the Duke of Albany.

== List of holders ==
=== First line of mormaers/earls ===
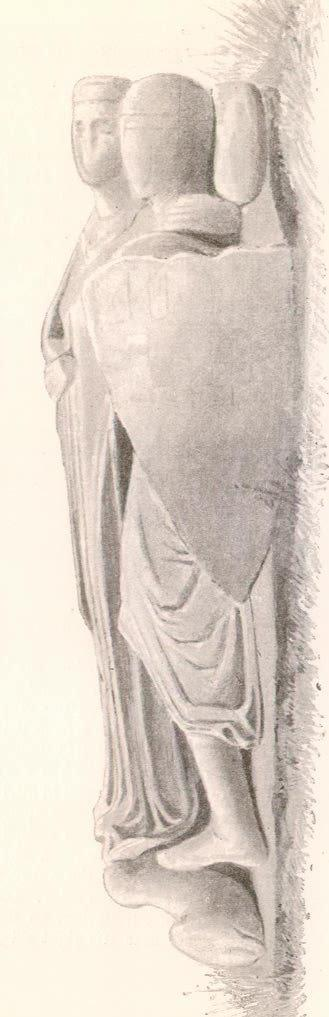
Effigy of Mary Menteith and Walter Bailloch Stewart. The arms depict Stewart distinguished by a label of five.

- Gille Críst, Earl of Menteith (Gilcrist) (d. 1189)
- Muireadhach I, Earl of Menteith (d. 1213)
- Muireadhach II, Earl of Menteith (d. 1234)
- Isabella, Countess of Menteith
  - m. Walter Comyn, Lord of Badenoch assumed the peerage in her right.
- Mary I, Countess of Menteith
  - m. Walter "Bailloch" Stewart

=== Second line, Stewarts of Menteith ===
- Alexander, Earl of Menteith
- Alan, Earl of Menteith
- Alan II, Earl of Menteith
- Muireadhach III, Earl of Menteith (d. 1332)
- Mary Menteith, Countess of Menteith
  - m. Sir John Graham assumed the peerage in her right.
- Margaret, Countess of Menteith
  - m. Robert Stewart, Duke of Albany
- Muireadhach IV Stewart, Earl of Menteith, executed in 1425 and the peerages forfeited.

=== Third line, Grahams of Menteith ===
- Malise Graham, 1st Earl of Menteith (1406–1490)
- Alexander Graham, 2nd Earl of Menteith (c. 1475–c. 1537)
- William Graham, 3rd Earl of Menteith (c. 1500–c. 1543)
- John Graham, 4th Earl of Menteith (c. 1529–c. 1565)
- William Graham, 5th Earl of Menteith (c. 1555–c. 1578)
- John Graham, 6th Earl of Menteith (c. 1571–c. 1598)
- William Graham, 7th Earl of Menteith (c. 1591–1661), also created Earl of Airth in 1633
- William Graham, 8th Earl of Menteith (c. 1634–1694), extinct or dormant after his death on 12 September 1694

== See also ==
- Stuart-Menteth Baronets

The Stuart-Menteth Baronetcy, of Closeburn in the County of Dumfries and Mansfield in the County of Ayr, is a title in the Baronetage of the United Kingdom. It was created on 11 August 1838 for Charles Stuart-Menteth. The Stuart-Menteth family traces its descent from Walter Comyn (third son of Walter Comyn, Justiciar of Scotia), who in 1258 married Isabella, Countess of Menteith (or Menteth).
