= Malise II, Earl of Strathearn =

Coat of arms of the Earls of Strathearn

Máel Ísu or Malise II (Modern Gaelic: Maol Íosa; died 1271) is the fifth known mormaer, or earl, of the Scottish region of Strathearn. He was the son of Robert, 4th Earl of Strathearn.

== Biography ==
Malise first appears on record in 1244, when he promised to observe the Treaty of York, the signing of which had been witnessed by his father. By this treaty, the King of Scots had dropped his claims to the northern shires of England. He was present in parliament from 1244 to 1245, and took part in the inauguration of King Alexander III in 1249. He was a friend of King Henry III of England, and was tasked by him to attend his daughter Margaret, when she became Queen of Scots as the wife of Alexander. In 1259 he obtained safe conduct from King Henry to go abroad, and had returned the following year.

Malise was an intelligent man who managed to retain the favor of both the Scottish and English kings. Said to have been "munificent above all his compatriots", he was also much noted for his generosity. Throughout his life he made considerable gifts to Inchaffray Abbey, giving the monks command of several of his serfs, and the right to take stone from the quarry of Nethergask, as well as donating several monetary sums.

== Death and burial ==
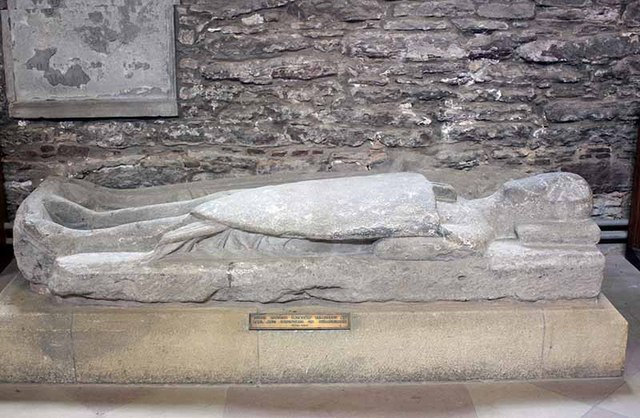
The grave of Malise II, Dunblane Cathedral

Malise is believed to have died in 1271, while in France. His body was brought back to Scotland, and he was buried at Dunblane Cathedral, the religious centre of Strathearn. In 1817, during reconstruction of Dunblane Cathedral, two sarcophagi were discovered with life-size effigies of a warrior and his lady. Since the fourteenth-century chronicler John of Fordun had recorded Dunblane as the burial site of Malise, these were determined to be the tombs of Malise and his countess, though which one is uncertain. It was marked with the date 1271. In addition, Sir Robert Sibbald once mentioned that in the late 17th century, there was a picture in the church which represented the Countess of Strathearn and her children kneeling for a blessing to St. Blane, though its whereabouts today are unknown.

== Marriages and children ==
Earl Malise married four times:

- Firstly, around 1245, to Marjory de Muschamp, daughter and coheiress of Sir Robert de Muschamp by his wife Isabel. They had two daughters:
1. Muriel, born before 1245, married William, Earl of Mar
2. Mary, born about 1251, married Sir Nicholas de Graham of Dalkeith and Abercorn.
- Secondly, before December 1257, Matilda, daughter of Gilbert, Earl of Orkney and Caithness. They had two sons and one daughter:
1. Malise III, Earl of Strathearn, who succeeded him
2. Robert
3. Cecilia
- Thirdly it appears he married a woman named Emma, though her parentage is unknown and they evidently had no issue
- Fourthly, in or after 1265, he married Maria, daughter of Ewan, Lord of Argyll and widow of Magnus, King of Mann. She survived Earl Malise and married Sir Hugh Abernethy, by whom she was the mother of Alexander Abernethy

== Bibliography ==
- Neville, Cynthia J., Native Lordship in Medieval Scotland: The Earldoms of Strathearn and Lennox, c. 1140-1365, (Portland & Dublin, 2005)

Preceded by Robert	Earl of Strathearn; 1245–1271	Succeeded by Malise III
