= Erengisle Sunesson, Earl of Orkney =

Swedish magnate

Erengisle Sunesson of Hultboda, jarl of Orkney (died 26 December 1392) was an important Swedish magnate in the 14th century. In his later life, he was known as Jarl Erengisle in Sweden. He was knight, high councillor, and titular (Norwegian) jarl.

== Family ==
He was born in a noble family later called Bååt (Old Swedish for boat) originally from Småland, as son of Sune Jonsson, the lawspeaker of Tiohärad, and his first wife Cathrine Henriksdatter Glysing. In 1320, Erengisle's father Sune and uncle Peter obtained the effectively hereditary position of chatelain of Viipuri castle in easternmost coast of Finland by purchasing it from the governor. It was set there by the deposed king Birger of Sweden. Peter and Sune recognized the new king, Magnus Eriksson of Sweden, and received important privileges, which effectively turned their holding of Viipuri as an independent feudal fief, the start of a veritable margraviate (see fief of Viipuri).

== Life ==
Erengisle possessed immense wealth in several provinces of Sweden. In Viipuri province, his patrimony included Kymenkartano manor, on which spot the later town of Kotka became erected. His chief seat was the medieval castle of Hultaboda (now Hultaby) in Näsby outside of Vetlanda. Also Flishult manor in the same district belonged to him.

He was usually a supporter of his king, Magnus Eriksson of Norway and Sweden, although in some instances he was in alliance with king's rivals. The king's Norwegian tasks for him led to his marriage with an unnamed daughter (possibly Agnes) of Maol Íosa, the Jarl of Orkney (including Caithness), and Earl of Strathearn. Because Maol Íosa did not have sons, families of his daughters divided or competed over his inheritance. Erengisle became the Orkney Jarl, although there is little evidence that he ever treated it as anything other than a high title, bringing him prestige over the then titleless Swedish nobility; he doesn't even seem to have ever visited his jarldom.

In 1357 Erengisle was among magnates who proclaimed Eric, the eldest son of king Magnus, as king in place of the father. He then led negotiations which resulted in reconciliation between father and son, with them splitting the kingship. The marriage of Haakon VI of Norway to the daughter of Valdemar IV of Denmark, and Eric's sudden death (from The Plague), drastically changed the political dynamic of Scandinavia, leading Erengisle to be ejected from the Jarldom in 1359.

The Jarldom lay vacant until Valdamar's death, in 1375. Haakon chose Alexander de l'Ard, a son-in-law of Maol Iosa, but he proved a disappointment, and was ejected after a few months. In 1379 Haakon granted the jarldom to Maol Iosa's (youngest) grandson, Henry Sinclair. Nevertheless, Erengisle continued to use the title of jarl of Orkney until his own death (as evidenced by e.g. his appellation in the text of his last will and testament).

== Death and will ==
Erengisle died childless, "at a great age", many years later. He was buried in Vadstena monastery church.

His last wife, Countess Ingeborg had several children from her first marriage with lord Bengt Turesson of the family of Kraakerum.

Erengisle's own nephews and nieces (and sisters) were already dead, without further issue, the last of them, Christina Ulvsdotter of Rickeby, having died in c 1389. His paternal family had only first cousins to continue the line (the Trolle, the Pipa, the Hammersta and the Snakenborg of Flishult presumably were lineages descending from such cousins).

His possessions were divided by his last will and testament, the church receiving much.

Marriages:

1. Margareta
2. Agnes (Annot), daughter of Maol Íosa, Earl of Strathearn and Jarl of Orkney
3. before 1377 with Ingeborg Magnusdotter of Loholm, close relative of royals (and niece of St.Bridget of Sweden)

== Coat of arms ==
Erengisle's family's hereditary shield depicted a boat. He thus belonged to the extensive clan of the Bonde. Well-known Bonde magnates, such as High Constable Tord and king Charles VIII, appear to have regarded Erengisle's family as their kinsmen. He belonged to the Haak-Bååt branch of the Bonde clan (the byname Haak was even used of his well-known uncle), mentioned as agnates of the Bonde. Erengisle's close kinsman was also bishop Charles of Linköping, but it is not known how exactly they were related. Also knight Erengisle Jonson 'the younger' (flourished 1335), was their kinsman.

His crest depicts, like those of families Bååt and Bonde, a boat.

Preceded by Maol Íosa	Jarl of Orkney; 1353–1357	Succeeded by Henry Sinclair the Elder
