= Margaret Graham, Countess of Menteith =

Scottish noblewoman (c.1334–1376)

Margaret Graham
- Countess of Menteith
- Born: 1334; Doune Castle, Perthshire, Scotland
- Died: c. 1376; Scotland
- Spouse: Sir John Moray, Lord of Bothwell; Thomas, 9th Earl of Mar; Sir Malcolm Drummond; Robert Stewart, Duke of Albany
- Issue: John Drummond; Janet; Mary; Margaret; Joan; Beatrice; Isabella; Marjorie; Murdoch Stewart

Margaret Graham, Countess of Menteith (c. 1334 – c. 1376) was a Scottish noblewoman. She held the title Countess of Menteith in her own right, having inherited the title c. 1360 from her mother, Mary, Countess of Menteith, who was married to Sir John Graham. Graham was styled Earl of Menteith during his marriage with Mary, whom he predeceased. The Menteith region was situated partially in southwest Perthshire and partly in Stirlingshire.

== Marriages and Children ==
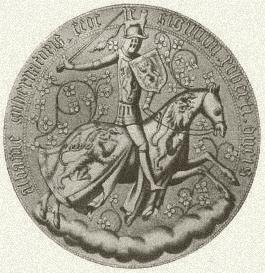
Seal of Margaret's fourth husband, Robert Stewart, Duke of Albany.

Margaret Graham was married four times, two of her marriages occurring before the age of twenty. First, she married Sir John Moray, Lord of Bothwell, (son of Sir Andrew Moray and Lady Christina Bruce). Because she and Moray were related within the forbidden degree of kinship, a papal dispensation was sought and received in 1348. Lady Margaret took her husband's surname and was known as Margaret of Moravia. Sir John died, probably in late 1351. The couple had no children.

Margaret married secondly Thomas, 9th Earl of Mar, and once again a papal dispensation was needed due to kinship. However, charging that Margaret was unable to have children, Earl Thomas divorced her after four years, and she returned to live with her mother.

Around 1360, she married thirdly Sir John Drummond of Concraig, a marriage intended to relieve a long-standing feud between their respective clans. Once again, Margaret took the surname of her husband. As before, the degree of kinship required a papal dispensation, but since their son John had been born before the couple sought the dispensation, they were required to do penance. Sir John died quite soon after the dispensation was granted, probably before the year was out.

Margaret’s fourth marriage was to Robert Stewart, 1st Duke of Albany, a son of King Robert II of Scotland and Elizabeth Mure of Rowallan. Sources disagree on both the number of Duke Robert’s children and their respective mothers, leaving a definitive statement regarding Margaret’s children by Robert unresolved. The Scots Peerage acknowledges her to be the mother of only Murdoch, 2nd Duke of Albany (1362-1425) Cracroft’s Peerage records her as the mother of six children, one son and five daughters:

- Murdoch Stewart, Duke of Albany, who married Lady Elizabeth, Countess of Lennox.
- Mary (d. 1420), who married Sir William Abernethy of Saltoun.
- Margaret (d. 1402), who married Sir John Swinton of Swinton.
- Joan, who married her third cousin, Robert Stewart, 1st Lord of Lorne.
- Beatrice (d. 1424), who married James Douglas, 7th Earl of Douglas and 1st Earl of Avonmore.
- Isabella, who married firstly Alexander Leslie, 9th Earl of Ross, before 1398, and secondly Walter de Haliburton, 1st Lord Haliburton of Dirleton between 1402 and 1408.

The Scots Peerage names a seventh child:

- Janet, who was contracted to wed David de Leon in 1372

== Titles ==
Margaret Graham became Countess of Menteith upon the death of her mother, the previous Countess, who had held the title before her marriage to Sir John Graham, who predeceased her. Margaret held the title in her own right, but upon her marriage to Robert Stewart, her husband was called Duke of Albany and Earl of Monteith. The title Earl of Menteith passed to Margaret’s son, Murdoch, 2nd Duke of Albany, when Robert Stewart died in 1420.

The wife of an earl uses the title countess. Therefore, when married to Thomas, Earl of Mar, Margaret was called Countess of Mar.

Margaret was called Countess of Fife during her marriage with Robert Stewart, who received the title via an agreement between himself and Isabella, the wife of his deceased brother Walter. Margaret did not hold this title in her own right. However, since her husband was a member of the royal family, the title Countess of Fife made her “the senior Countess in the realm.”

Margaret was never styled Duchess of Albany because she died before her husband received the title Duke of Albany in 1398.

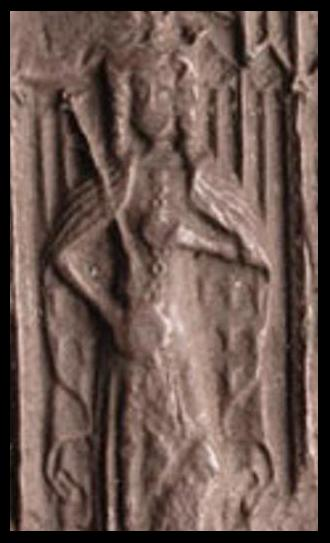
Margaret's son, Murdoch Stewart, Duke of Albany.

== Death and Burial ==
Margaret Graham died between 20 July 1372 and 4 May 1380, and was at buried Inchmahome Priory, Perthshire, Scotland.

== Notes ==
Preceded by Mary II	Mormaer/Earl of Menteith (d. c. 1380)	Succeeded by Murdoch Stewart
