= Alan II, Earl of Menteith =

Scottish nobleman

- Predecessor: Alan, Earl of Menteith
- Successor: Mary II, Countess of Menteith
- Died: after 23 August 1315
- Issue: Mary II, Countess of Menteith
- Father: Alan, Earl of Menteith
- Mother: Marjory

Alan II, Earl of Menteith (d. after 23 August 1315) was a Scottish nobleman.

== Life ==
Menteith was the son of Alan, Earl of Menteith and Marjory or Margery, and is first noted in an order dated at Carlisle in 1307 to provide foodstuffs "to the two sons of the Earl of Menteith, and the son of the Earl of Stratherne". He evidently was an English prisoner, but he either escaped to the Scottish camp or was exchanged for an English nobleman held by the Scots. "Alan, son of Earl Alan of Menteith" was the beneficiary of the entail by his cousin Duncan of the Earldom of Fife in the event of the failure of lawful heirs in an agreement dated at Crichton, 23 August 1315. He died some time before 1 August 1323, on which date his uncle Muireadhach III witnessed a charter as Earl of Menteith.

== Marriage and issue ==
Alan II, Earl of Menteith married an unknown lady, by whom he had a daughter Mary II, Countess of Menteith.

== Notes ==
Preceded by Alan	Mormaer/Earl of Menteith (d. after 23 August 1315)	Succeeded by Muireadhach III
