= John de Moray of Drumsargard =

13th-14th century Scottish noble

John de Moray
- Lord of Drumsagard
- Died: c. 1322
- Noble family: Moray family
- Father: William de Moray

John de Moray (died c. 1322), Lord of Drumsagard, was a Scottish noble.

He was the eldest son of William de Moray of Drumsagard. He obtained the lands of Abercairney, Aberrochil, Rossiechill, Eggie and Egglesmachan upon his second marriage.

== Marriages and issue ==
From his first marriage, he is known to have had the following issue:

- unknown de Moray, killed during a fight with Godfrey Ross, Sheriff of Ayr and Lanark.
- Maurice de Moray, married Johanna, Countess of Strathearn, had issue.

John married secondly Mary, daughter to Malise, Earl of Strathearn, they are known to have had the following issue:

- Alexander de Moray of Ogilvy and Abercairny
- Walter de Moray of Glasswell
