= Alexander, Earl of Menteith =

Scottish nobleman

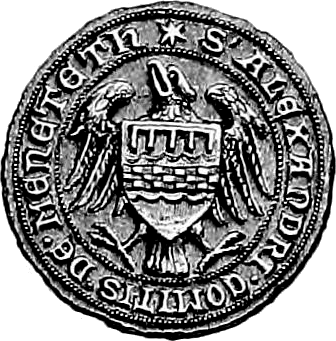
Seal of Alexander Stewart, Earl of Menteith

Alexander of Menteith (d. bef. 1306), a Scottish nobleman and member of the Stewart family, he was the Earl of Menteith.

== Life ==
Alexander was the eldest son and heir of Walter Bailloch Stewart and Mary I, Countess of Menteith and was the Mormaer or Earl of Menteith succeeding his mother the de jure countess. The first mention of him in records is with his brother John de Menteith in a compact dated on 20 September 1286, at Turnberry, Carrick, between Bruce and the Stewarts. In another writ, of uncertain date, granted by their father to Kilwinning Abbey, he and his brother are styled Alexander and John de Menteith. Alexander joined with his father in a charter granting the church of Kippen to the Cambuskenneth Abbey situated within the earldom as a place of burial; the writ being dated 1286. He was appointed the Sheriff of Dumbarton in 1288. Prior to succeeding his father, Alexander was at Norham in 1291, and was among those who swore fealty to Edward I. Alexander was with his brother John at the Battle of Dunbar on 27 April 1296, and fled to Dunbar Castle where he and others were taken prisoner and he was committed to the Tower of London. His detention was not long, however, and he was liberated after promising to serve the English King, meeting with him at Elgin 27 July 1296. He repeated this promise, and swore fealty at Berwick a month later, on 28 August, as Alexander Comes Meneteth. Alexander then gave over two of his sons, Alan and Peter, as hostages. Alexander seems to have retired from public life after this, tending only to his family affairs. He died before 1306.

== Family ==
He married a lady named Matilda (Maud), a daughter of Robert, Earl of Strathearn, and Matilda, and together they had the following children:

- Alan, Earl of Menteith, who succeeded his father as Earl.
- Peter, who in 1296 was a hostage in England with his brother Alan. He accompanied King Edward to Flanders, and took part in the French campaign of 1297, where he may have been killed.
- Murdach, who became Earl of Menteith.
- Alexander, styled as brother of Murdach in a charter to Gilbert Drummond.
- Malise, who had a charter from Robert I of the lands of Ballygillachy, married Margaret Mar with issue
- Margaret de Menteith, wife of Alexander de Abernethy.
- Ellen, recently identified as the wife of William Ferrers, 1st Baron Ferrers of Groby (d. 20 March 1324/5).

        Alan Durward  =  Margery of
          E of Athol  I   Scotland
                      I
                      I
       Colban     =  Anne      =  Sir William
      E of Fife   I  Durward   I   de Ferrers
        d. 1270   I            I   (2nd husband)
   _______________I            I___________________________________________________________
   I                                                                                      I
   I              ______________________________________________________                  I
   I              I                            I                       I                  I
   I          Alexander   =    Matilda      Sir John de Menteith     Elena  = John        I
   I       E of Menteith  I of Strathearn      I                        de Drummond       I
   I                      I                  __I______________________                    I
   I                      I                  I      I        I       I                    I
   I                      I                 John   Walter   Elena  Joanna                 I
   I                      I                              = Gillespie                      I
   I                      I                                Campbell                       I
 __I________            __I____________________________________________________           I
 I         I            I         I             I              I              I           I
Duncan   Margery  =   Alan      Murdoch     Margaret         Malise         Elena = Sir William
E of              I   E of        E of     = Alexander    de Menteith of          I  de Ferrers
Fife (d. 1289)    I  Menteith   Menteith   de Abernethy     Methlick              I   d. 1325
 I                I                                            I                  I
 I             ___I                                            I                  I
 I             I                                               I                  I
Duncan       Alan                                      Walter de Menteith        Anne
 E of     E of Menteith                                    of Methlick           de Ferrers
 Fife    heir of Fife, 1315                            d. aft 13 Jul 1364       = Edward le
               I                                               I                  Despenser
               I                                               I
             Mary   =  Sir John                           John de Menteith
             C of      de Graham                           d. bef 1394
           Menteith     d. 1346

== See also ==
- Brown, Michael, The Wars of Scotland, 1214-1371, (Edinburgh, 2004)
- J. Ravilious, The Earls of Menteith: Alexander, Earl of Menteith and Sir Alexander de Abernethy, The Scottish Genealogist (September 2010), Vol. LVII, No. 3, pp. 130–139.
- J. Ravilious, The Earls of Menteith: Murdoch, Earl of Menteith and the Ferrers family of Groby, The Scottish Genealogist (March 2013), Vol. LX, No. 1, pp. 12–25.

Preceded by Mary with Walter Bailloch Stewart	Mormaer/Earl of Menteith x 1295–1297 x 1304	Succeeded by Alan
