= Maurice de Moravia, Earl of Strathearn =

Scottish noble

Maurice de Moravia, Earl of Strathearn (1276–1346), also known as Maurice Moray or Murray, was a Scottish nobleman.

Moray was the eldest son of Sir John de Moray of Drumsargard and his wife Mary, daughter to Malise, 7th Earl of Strathearn. He appears in sources for the first time in 1335 as one of the leaders of the patriotic party in Scotland. By this point he had become a powerful military leader, being styled by Walter Bower "Lord of Clydesdale". In 1335, Moray met with other Scottish nobles to reject the terms of peace offered by Edward III of England, and to reaffirm their resistance to English rule. He consequently had his lands forfeited by Edward Balliol, who bestowed them on English knight Anthony de Lucy.

According to Bower, he was present at the siege and taking of Perth in 1339 where he is styled Lord of Clydesdale.

The same year, Moray is recorded as having slain a knight named Godfrey Ross, the Sheriff of Ayr and Lanark, who had killed his brother. In 1341 he was present at the parliament held at Scone, which was the first after the return of King David from France. In 1342, the English surrendered Stirling Castle to the Scots, and Moray was appointed as its keeper. He substantially strengthened and provisioned the castle, spending the then enormous sum of £150 on equipment. In the words of Andrew of Wyntoun, he "inforyst it grettumly, for riche he was and full mychty".

Moray received considerable grants of land for his services, and was evidently a favourite of King David. In 1344, David assigned Moray the earldom of Strathearn, which had been forfeited by Moray's uncle Earl Malise.

Earl Maurice was killed at the Battle of Neville's Cross on 17 October 1346.

== Marriage and issue ==
Earl Maurice married Joan de Menteith, the daughter of Sir John Menteith of Ruskie, who had been married twice before; firstly to Moray's grandfather Malise, 7th Earl of Strathearn, and secondly to John Campbell, Earl of Atholl. They had only one daughter, Joan, who married firstly Thomas de Moray, Knt., of Bothwell, and secondly Archibald, 3rd Earl of Douglas, a.k.a. "Black Archibald the Grim". After Maurice's death Joan married William, 5th Earl of Sutherland.

Vacant Title last held by Malise	Earl of Strathearn; 1343/4–1346	Vacant Title next held by Robert Stewart
