= William de Abernethy, 2nd Baron of Saltoun =

Sir William de Abernethy, 2nd Baron of Saltoun was a 13th-14th century Scottish baron and noble.

William was the son of William Abernethy, 1st Baron of Saltoun. He swore fealty to King Edward I of England at Birgham in 1290 and again at Berwick in 1296. He was a signatory of the Declaration of Arbroath in 1320.

== Family and issue ==
William is known to have had the following known issue:

- William (d.1333)
