= Eustace de Maxwell =

14th-century Scottish noble

- Died: 3 March 1342; Caerlaverock, Scotland

Arms of Sir Eustace de Maxwell: Argent, a saltire sable.

Sir Eustace de Maxwell (died 3 March 1342), Lord of Caerlaverock, was a 14th-century Scottish noble.

== Life ==
Maxwell was the heir of John de Maxwell, Lord of Caerlaverock. He was holding Caerlaverock Castle in 1312 for the English, before changing allegiances to King Robert I of Scotland. His castle of Caerlaverock was then placed under siege by the English, who could not take the castle. He was a signatory to the Declaration of Arbroath and his seal was attached to the declaration. He was later tried for complicity in the Soules conspiracy, however was acquitted. Eustace allegiance was swayed to Edward Balliol, following Robert I's death. He fought at the Battle of Dupplin Moor and was at Balliol's Coronation at Scone on 24 September 1332. Maxwell continued in active service with the English, when Balliol fled. Eustace then rebelled against the English in 1338, however was pardoned by King Edward III of England in 1339. He died at Caerlaverock on 3 March 1342. Eustace had married Helen, daughter of Robert Maxwell of Pollok. They had no surviving issue and upon Eustace's death he was succeeded by his brother John Maxwell of Pencaitland.
