= Jack Short (betrayer of William Wallace) =

Betrayer of William Wallace

Jack Short was the betrayer of Scottish legend Sir William Wallace. He was Wallace's servant, and relayed information to the Scottish baron John de Menteith, resulting in Wallace's capture and execution. According to the chronicler Piers Langtoft, Wallace had slain Jack's brother.
