= William de Moray of Drumsagard =

13th-14th century Scottish noble

William de Moray
- Lord of Drumsagard
- Died: c. 1304
- Noble family: Moray family
- Father: Andrew Moray

William de Moray (died c. 1304), Lord of Drumsagard, was a Scottish noble.

He was a son of Andrew Moray, Justiciar of Scotia. He was a signatory to the Treaty of Salisbury and swore fealty to Edward I of England in 1296 and 1304. He was succeeded by his son John.
