= Lord of Knapdale =

The Lord of Knapdale was a title for the lord of Knapdale, Scotland in High Medieval Scotland.

== Lords of Knapdale ==
- Suibhne MacDunslebh
- Dubhghall mac Suibhne ??–1262
- Walter Stewart, Earl of Menteith 1262–
- John de Menteith
- John Monteith
