= Nicholas de Graham =

Sir Nicholas de Graham of Dalkeith and Abercorn, was a 13th-14th century Scottish noble.

Nicholas was the son of Henry de Graham. He was part of the Treaty of Salisbury in 1289. He was one of Robert de Brus, Lord of Annandale's auditors during the arbitration for the Crown of Scotland between 1291 and 1292.

He performed homage to King Edward I of England at Berwick-upon-Tweed on 28 August 1296. Nicholas died in 1306.

His escutcheon is described as "On a chief, three escallops".

== Family and issue ==
He married Mary de Strathearn, daughter of Malise, Earl of Strathearn, and Marjory de Muschamp, and is known to have had at least the following issue:

- John de Graham

Nicholas and Mary may be the parents of William Muschamp.
