= John de Graham (died 1337) =

Sir John de Graham of Dalkeith, Abercorn & Eskdale (1278–1337) was a 13th-14th century Scottish noble.

John, born in 1278, was the son of Nicholas de Graham of Dalkeith and Abercorn and Mary de Strathearn.

He fought at the Battle of Bannockburn against the English on 23–24 June 1314 and as a result had his Northumberland estates confiscated. King Edward II of England denounced John as an enemy and rebel, and granted his Scottish lands to Hugh le Despenser. He signed the Declaration of Arbroath in 1320.

John died on 25 April 1337.

== Family and issue ==
John married Isabella, and had the following known issue:

- Sir John de Graham, last of Dalkeith, Abercorn, and Eskdale, died without issue; resigned Dalkeith in favor of William Douglas of Laudonia 6 Jan 1343
- Sybilla de Graham, married Reginald de Mure, had issue. Abercorn passed to the Mure family.
- Isabel de Graham, married Walter Stewart, 6th High Steward of Scotland as his second wife, had issue.
- Margaret de Graham, married William Douglas, Lord of Liddesdale as his 1st wife.
