= Spey Tower =

Mediaeval tower in Scotland

General information
- Location: Scotland

Spey Tower, also known as Spy Tower, was a medieval gatehouse in Perth, Scotland. The tower was part of the Perth city walls (Perth being the only walled city in Scotland) and was located near to Gowrie House. It guarded the south gate of the city, close to the River Tay.

The tower contained a strong prison. Cardinal David Beaton confined people whom he had condemned for heresy, and witnessed their execution from the tower. The hereditary keepers of the tower were at one time the Rosses of Craigie.

The tower stood near the site of the Perth Sheriff Court, and was demolished in 1766.

== See also ==
- Perth Castle
