= Mary II, Countess of Menteith =

Scottish noblewoman

Mary II, Countess of Menteith was a Scottish noblewoman. Her father was Alan II, 7th Earl of Menteith, who died c. 1330 and her mother is known only as Marjory. She is believed to have agreed with her kinsman Muireadhach III, in 1330, that he should hold the Earldom, but when he was killed in August 1332, Mary assumed the title.

== Marriage ==
Mary married Sir John Graham (d. 28 February 1347), who in her right became 9th Earl of Monteith and assumed the title in May 1346. Mary was the mother of Margaret Graham, Countess of Menteith who married firstly Sir John Moray, Lord of Bothwell, secondly Thomas, 9th Earl of Mar, thirdly Sir John Drummond of Concraig, and fourthly Robert Stewart, 1st Duke of Albany.

Mary died sometime prior to 29 April 1360.

Preceded by Muireadhach III	Mormaer/Earl of Menteith (d. in or before 1360)	Succeeded by Margaret Graham
