= Magnús Jónsson, Earl of Orkney =

Magnús Jónsson
- Born: Magnús Jónsson; January 1, 1291; Kirkwall, Orkney, Scotland
- Died: January 1, 1329

Magnús Jónsson, sometimes styled Magnus V, was Jarl of Orkney (covering the whole of Norðreyjar Which includes not only the Orkney Islands, but the Shetland (Hjaltland) Islands c. post Hjaltland 1300–1321.

The Shetland isles were officially transferred to the Scottish from the Norwegians in 1472. Scots soon emigrated there between the 16th and 17th century.

He was a signatory to the Declaration of Arbroath, which describes him as Earl of Caithness and Orkney.
