= Gowrie House (Perth, Scotland) =

House in Perth and Kinross, Scotland

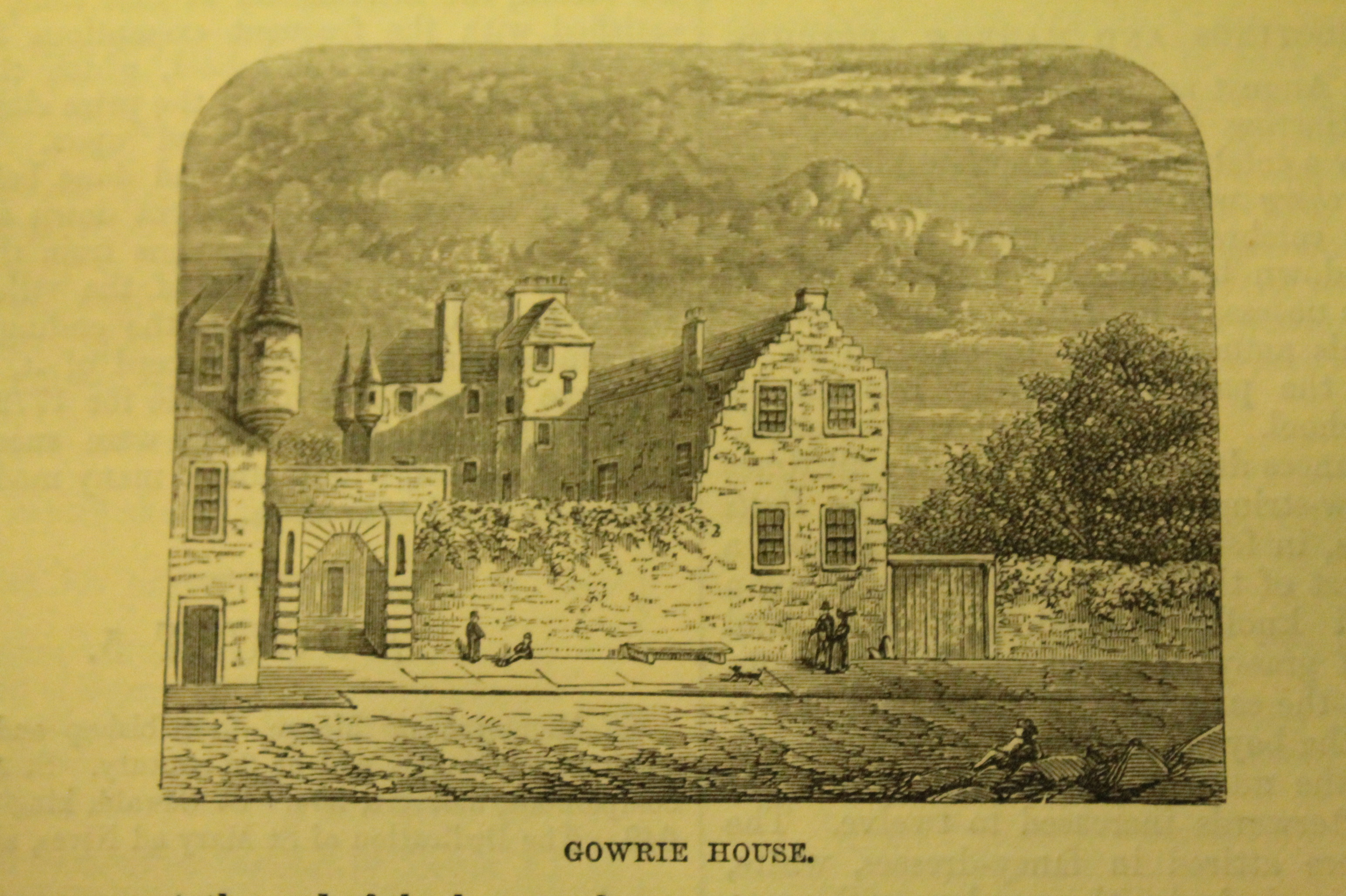
- Gowrie House, around 1650

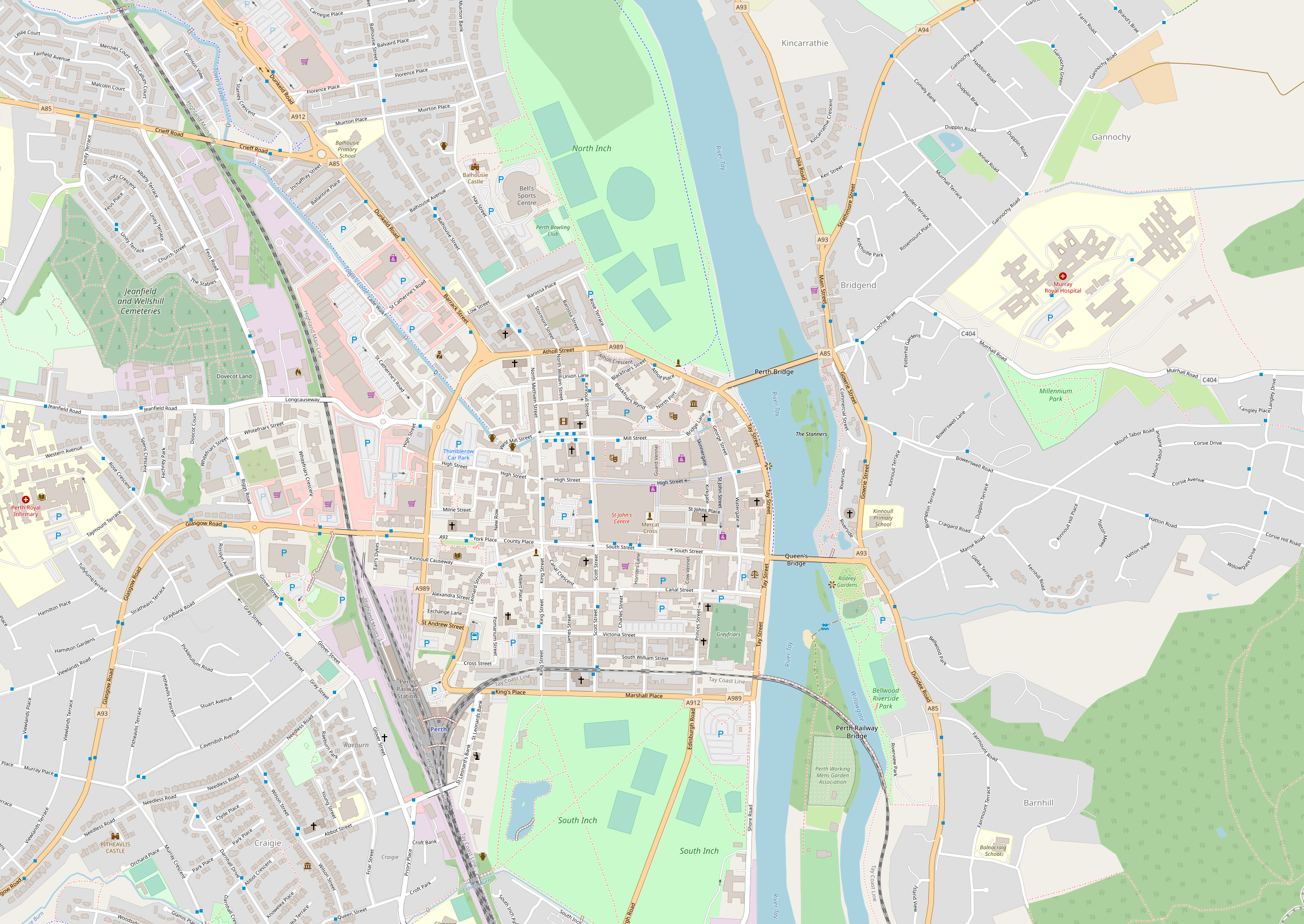
- Shown in Perth
- 56°23′41″N 3°25′33″W
- Location: Perth; Perth and Kinross; Scotland

History
- Built: circa 1518 (508 years ago)

Gowrie House was a mansion in the centre of Perth, Scotland, which was in existence between the 16th and 18th centuries. It was the scene of a controversial incident on 5 August 1600, and was later converted to army barracks.

== Location ==
Gowrie House formerly stood on what became Tay Street, its location now occupied by Perth Sheriff Court, County Buildings and 46–52 Tay Street (the last has “Gowrie House” written on its frontage). The building extended from Water Vennel to Canal Street, bounded on the west by Speygate and on the east by the River Tay. Its entrance was an arched gateway on South Street.

== Early history ==
A building in Speygate in the mid-20th century

An earlier house on the site was standing in 1518, built or occupied by Elizabeth Gray, Countess of Huntly and the second wife of Alexander Gordon, 3rd Earl of Huntly. A document of 1552 mentions the great lodging that she had built in the Speygate of Perth.

In 1527, the building was purchased by William Ruthven, 1st Lord Ruthven, around a year before his death, from Elizabeth Ruthven, dowager Countess of Erroll. The building's appearance at this time is acknowledged with a bronze panel, by Sir John Steell, on the south wall of the present building.

== Gowrie House and the Ruthvens ==
Gowrie House was so-named for the title Earl of Gowrie, given to William, Lord Ruthven, in 1581. The Ruthvens were frequently Provosts of Perth. A workman, Archibald Wylie, was killed by a fall of stone masonry during building work on the house on 5 May 1579.

=== Christian Stewart ===
In 1596, Christian Stewart in Nokwater was accused of causing the death of Patrick Ruthven by witchcraft. Before her trial, she was questioned at Gowrie House by three Kirk ministers Patrick Galloway, William Couper, Archibald Moncreiff, and others, on 18 August, and on the 19 and 21 August. They produced and signed written statements called "depositions". Christian Stewart was taken to Edinburgh and another deposition was made on 13 September, in the presence of Robert Bruce, the physician Gilbert Moncreiff and the merchant Clement Cor. She was also questioned by King James VI at Linlithgow Palace. She seems to have confessed to obtaining a black cloth or "clout" from Isobel Stewart to bewitch Patrick Ruthven. The court in the Tolbooth of Edinburgh sentenced her to be burnt at the Castlehill.

=== Gowrie conspiracy ===
The house was central to the Gowrie conspiracy, a series of events unfolding on 5 August 1600, in which John Ruthven, 3rd Earl of Gowrie (1577–1600), and his brother, Alexander, Master of Ruthven (1580–1600), were attempting to kill or kidnap King James VI for unknown purposes. The King was lured to Perth from his hunting near Falkland Palace, possibly by a story of buried treasure, and offered dinner in the house. James was separated from his companion and threatened in a room at the top of the house. His retinue killed both brothers during the attack, and the king survived. The angry townspeople of Perth were pacified.

James VI ordered that the building be defaced by removing some of its corner turrets. In 1602, he gifted the building to the city, though he was careful to exclude its name when making the gift. His hunting companions including Thomas Erskine were richly rewarded. King James continued to commemorate his rescue on every 5 August for the rest of his reign. A stage play The Tragedy of Gowrie was presented by the King's Players in London in 1604, but the script is lost.

The house was granted to James Maxwell in 1622, and latterly became the home of George Hay, 1st Earl of Kinnoull (1570–1634), amongst others.

=== Army barracks ===
In 1746, the city gifted the house to Prince William, Duke of Cumberland, in recognition of his victory at the Battle of Culloden. It is believed the duke later passed the house to his nephew, Admiral Watson, who sold it to the UK government for £2,000. It was converted into artillery barracks, and was occupied until the French Revolution. Several plans of the house were made during these years and are kept by the National Library of Scotland. In 1805, it was traded back from the government by the city in exchange for a site on which to build a depot for prisoners of war. Five acres of Moncreiffe land were given over.

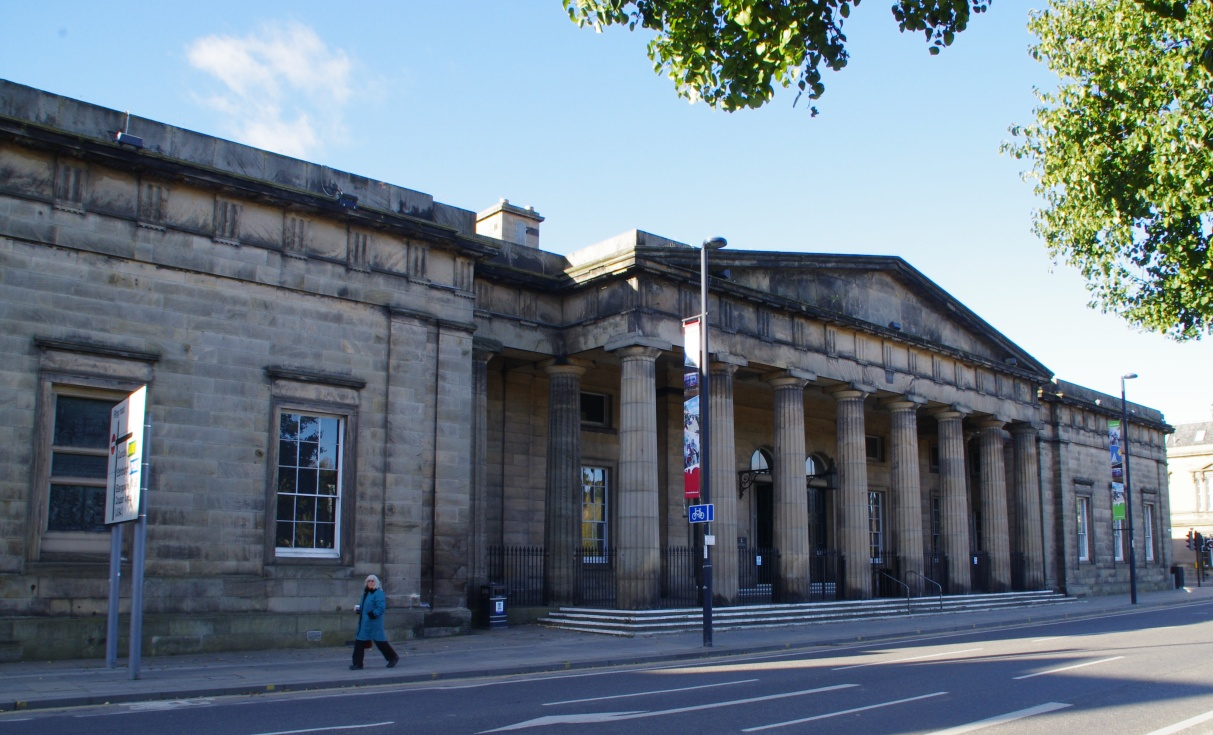
The buildings occupying the site of the Gowrie House today

During demolition in 1807 observers considered that the east and southern wings were older, with noticeably thicker walls, and were probably originally built for Elizabeth Gray. The west and northern buildings were built by the Ruthvens. The workmen were said to have found concealed vaults and closets in the old walls, one with an earthenware urn of bones. There was also a tower or garden building near the River Tay, known as the Monk's Tower, and intended to serve as a summer house or banqueting room. The 17th-century painted ceiling of the Monk's Tower included the symbols of the zodiac and heraldry of Hay of Kinnoull. The summer house was used for meetings by Charles II in 1650, and he may have stayed in Gowrie House. A detailed household account covering Charles' months in Perth reveals that the king had a boat or barge on the Tay, and was allowed more sugar in his pies than his courtiers, but does not mention that the "King's house" where he resided in Perth was Gowrie House. The older parts of Gowrie House and the Monk's Tower before demolition were indicated on plans published by David Peacock.

In documentation from 1911, a Gowrie Rest House, Labour Yard and Lodging Home for Men and Boys stood on Speygate.
