= Inchaffray Abbey =

Former abbey in Perth and Kinross, Scotland

Coordinates: 56°23′2″N 3°41′49″W

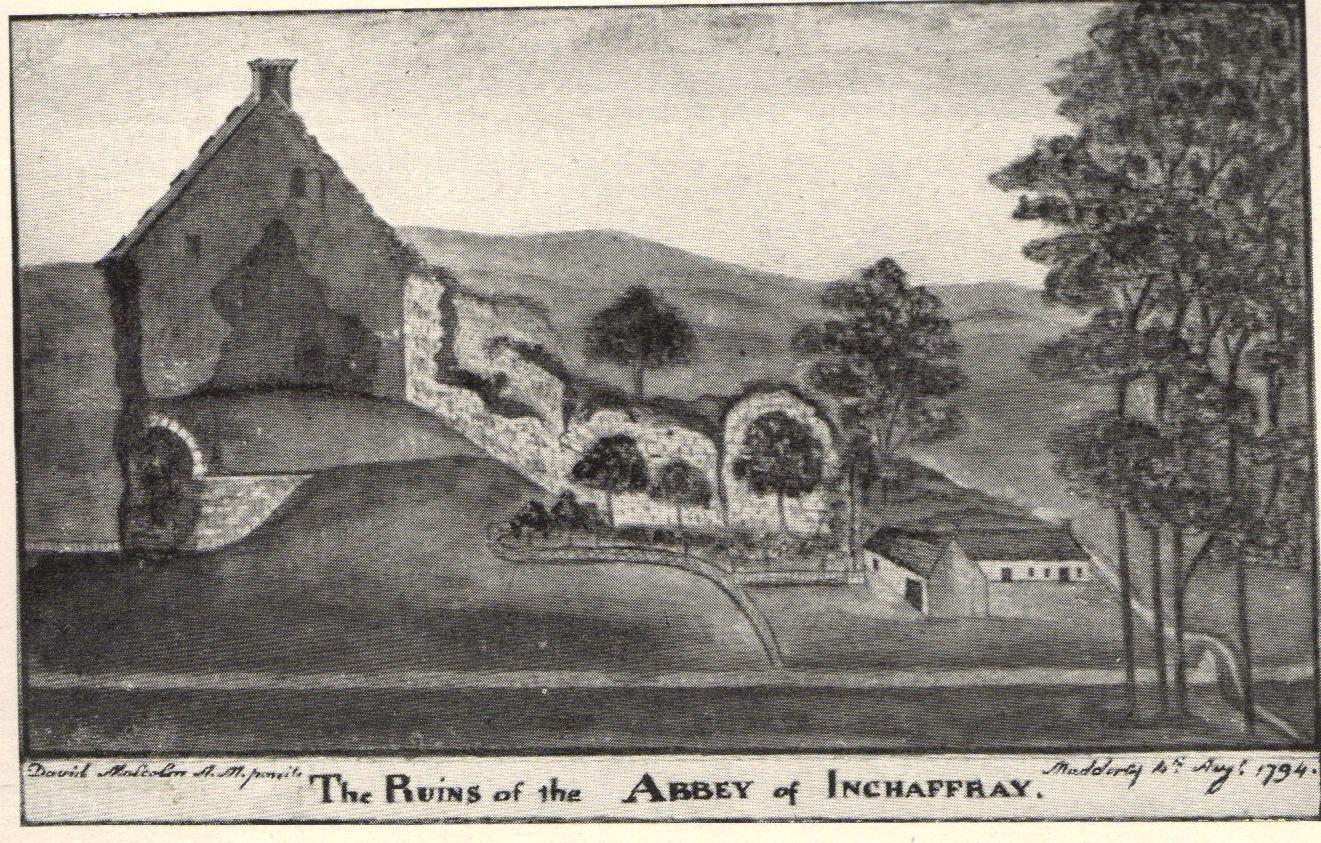
Ruins of the abbey as depicted in 1794

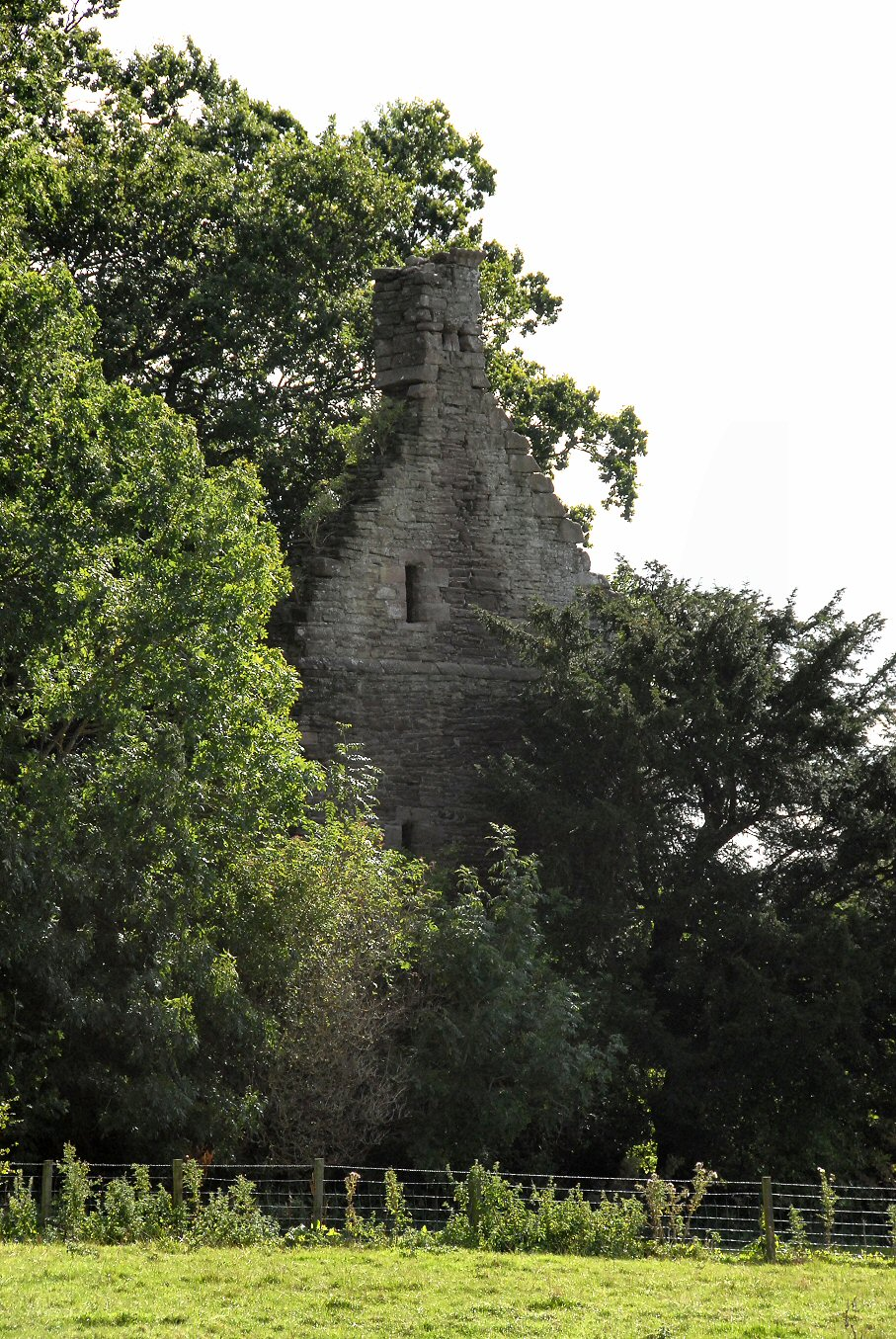
Abbey as it is today. This taken from the reverse angle of the above sketch.

Inchaffray Abbey was situated by the village of Madderty, midway between Perth and Crieff in Strathearn, Scotland. The only traces now visible are an earth mound and some walls on rising ground which once (before drainage) formed an island where the abbey once stood (the surrounding marshes known for eels).

== History ==
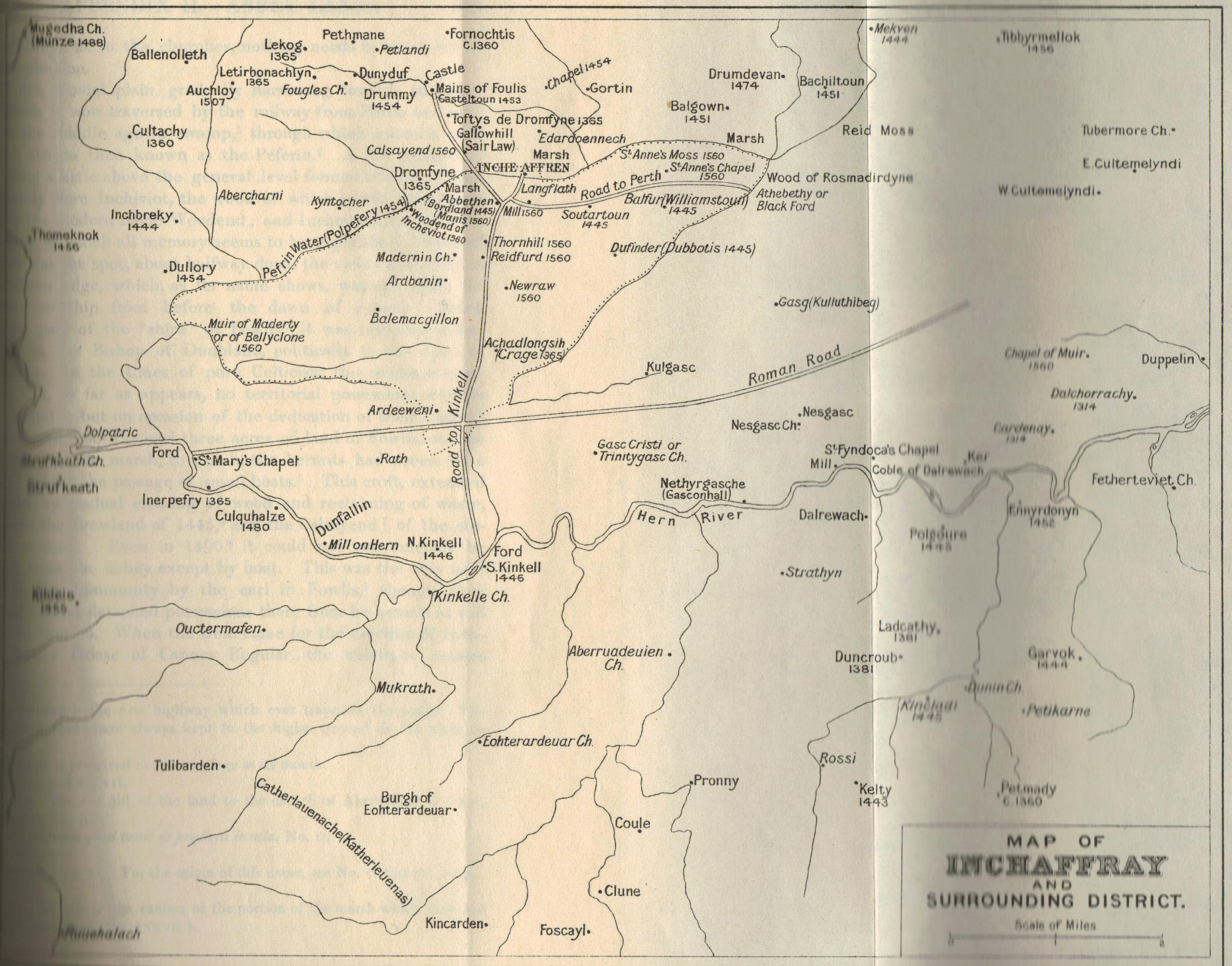
Map of the area around the abbey in Strathearn

Folk etymology has the name Inchaffray taken from the Gaelic innis abh reidh (island of the smooth water), but the earliest attested form of the name is the Latin Insula missarum (island of the masses), mass in Gaelic being oifrend and Welsh offeren, thus island of the offerings. A charter of Jonathan, Bishop of Dunblane, refers to the place "qui uocatur lingua Scottica Inche Affren" (="which is called in the Gaelic language Inche Affren") and comparative usage shows that Insula Missarum was taken as a translation, e.g. "Sancti Johannis evangeliste de Inchefrren" and "sancto Johanni apostolo de Insula Misserum".

A priory was created on the site of an existing ecclesiastical establishment of a group of clerics known as "the brethren of St John of Strathearn". Gilbert, Earl of Strathearn and his first known wife Maud d'Aubigny, daughter of William d'Aubigny (Brito) erected the priory in 1200 in memory of their first-born son Gilchrist, was buried there in 1198. The old religious community was absorbed by the new foundation.

Dedicated to the Virgin Mary, and John the Evangelist, the abbey was granted to the Augustinians of Scone Abbey. The charter survives, granting the churches of Saint Cathan of Abruthven, Saint Ethernan of Madderty, Saint Patrick of Strogeith, Saint Makkessog of Auchterarder, and Saint Beanus of Kinkell. The details of the earlier establishments are not certain, but a church dedicated to John the Evangelist is attested in about 1190. The priory became an abbey in 1221.

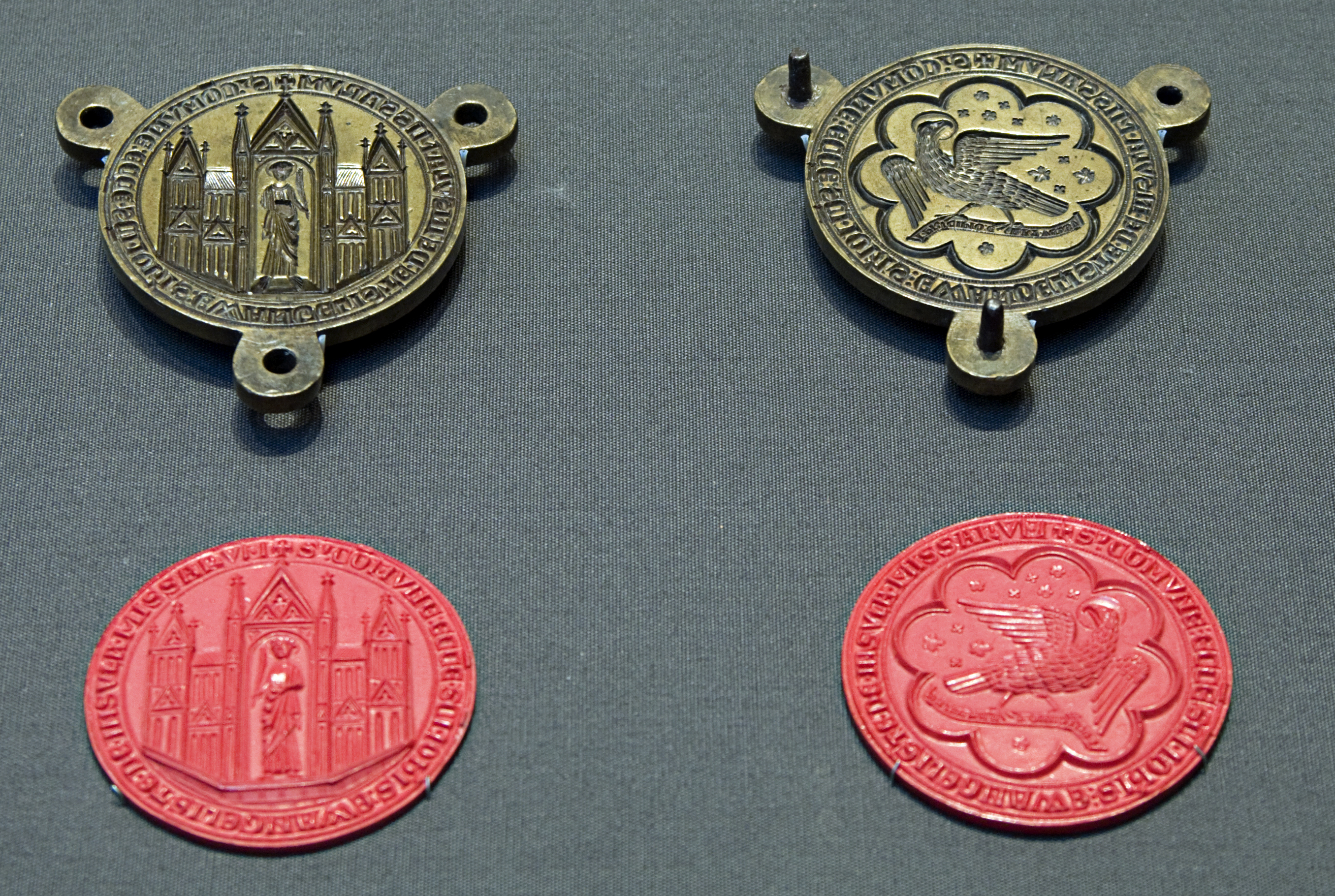
Two-sided pendant seals from Inchaffray Abbey, late 13th century, now in the British Museum.

Inchaffray was patronised both by the Earls of Strathearn and by the Scottish kings. In 1275 a tithe of real income was assessed on all religious houses to fund a crusade, at which time Inchaffray had an income of 246 pounds per annum, fourth among Augustinian houses, exceeded only by St Andrews, Scone and Holyrood. In time the abbey's lands and dependent churches stretched across Scotland, as far away as Uist in the west and Balfron in the south. The abbey ordered the digging of the Pow of Inchaffray, a nine-mile drainage ditch, to improve nearby marshland.

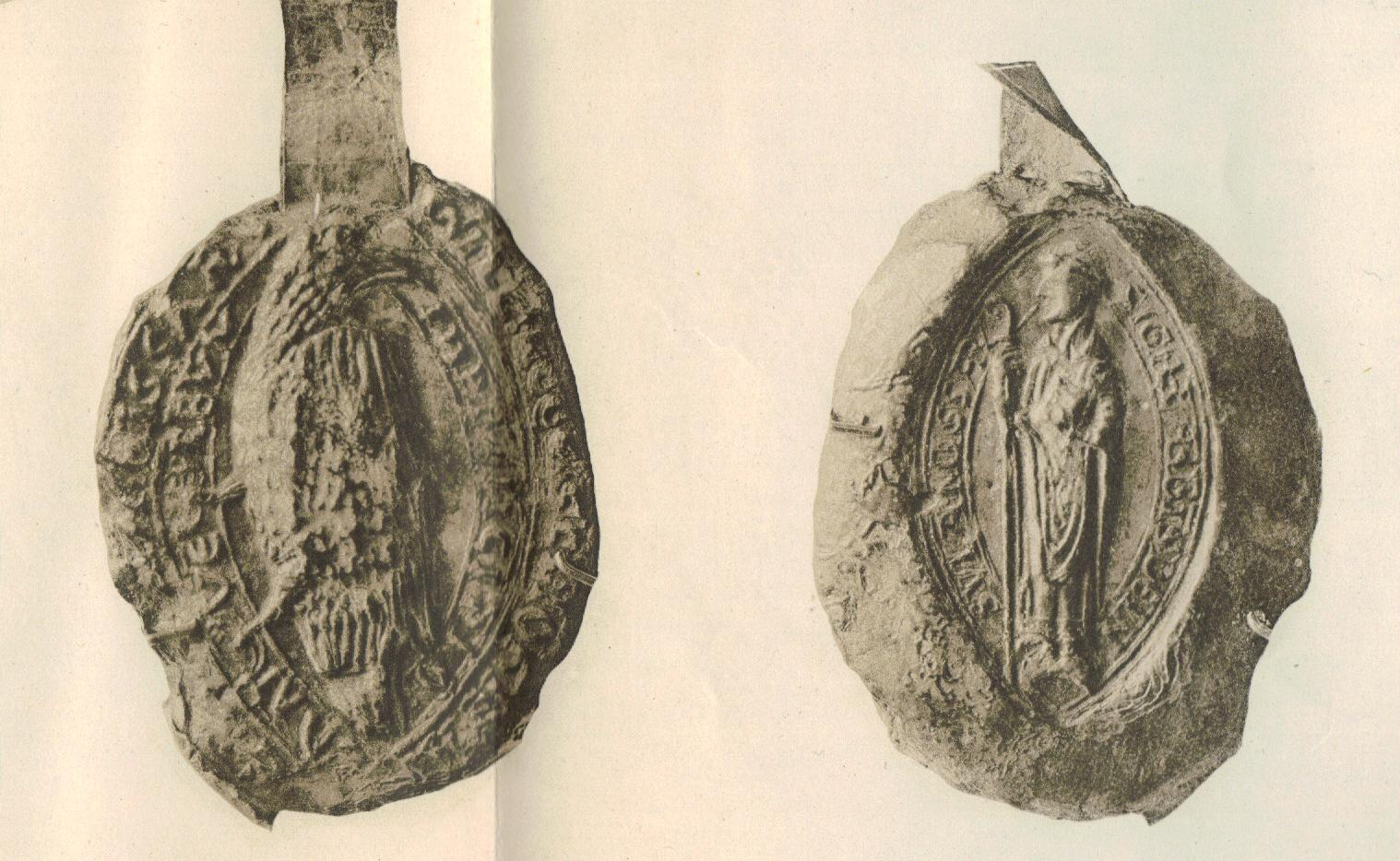
Seal of the abbot of Inchaffray. The abbot is either Innocent or Nicholas.

Abbot Maurice of Inchaffray carried the relics of Saint Fillan to bless the Scots army before the Battle of Bannockburn in 1314. Commendatory abbot Laurence Oliphant, who came from a notable Strathearn family, was killed at the Battle of Flodden in 1514.

By 1561 Inchaffrey's fortunes had declined, its income being assessed at £667, third lowest of the Augustinian abbeys in Scotland included in the levy. With the Scottish Reformation under way, Inchaffray had been turned into a secular lordship for a member of the Drummond family in 1556. James VI visited James Drummond at Inchaffray on 5 October 1601. The property later passed to the Earls of Kinnoull. Much of what remained of the abbey was destroyed in 1816 when a road was driven across the site.

Today a single gable-end wall stands in private property, although it is visible from the road. The ruins are designated a scheduled monument.

== Burials ==
- Jonathan of Dunblane
- Malise, 6th Earl of Strathearn

== See also ==
- Abbot of Inchaffray, for a list of priors, abbots and commendators
