= Alan, Earl of Menteith =

Scottish nobleman

- Predecessor: Alexander, Earl of Menteith
- Successor: Alan II, Earl of Menteith
- Died: c. 1310
- Spouse: Margery
- Issue: 2 sons, including Alan II, Earl of Menteith
- Father: Alexander, Earl of Menteith
- Mother: Matilda

Alan, Earl of Menteith (d. c. 1310) was a Scottish nobleman.

== Life ==
Menteith was the son of Alexander, Earl of Menteith and Matilda (Maud), and is first on record as a hostage in England, to ensure the good behaviour of his father in 1296. He and his brother Peter Menteith accompanied the English King as esquires on his expedition to Flanders in 1297.

He supported King Robert the Bruce in his initial attempt to seize power following the deposition of John Balliol. Menteith was declared forfeit by Edward I of England, and his lands and title given to John Hastings, 1st Baron Hastings. He was captured at the Battle of Methven, and given to Hastings' disposal. Menteith was committed to Abergavenny Castle; he died a prisoner before 13 March 1308/09, when John de Hastings had licence "to demise to Margery, late the wife of Alan, earl of Menteth, for her life, the manor of Wotton..."

Menteith was succeeded in his Earldom by his son Alan II, Earl of Menteith, who was then a minor.

== Marriage and issue ==
Alan, Earl of Menteith married Marjory or Margery, who has been shown to have been a daughter of Colban, Earl of Fife by his wife Anne Durward. They had two sons, one of whom, Alan, succeeded his father as Earl when a minor.

== Notes ==
Preceded by Alexander	Mormaer/Earl of Menteith (d. c. 1310)	Succeeded by Alan II
