= David Wemyss (died 1332) =

Sir David Wemyss of Wemyss (d. 1332) was a 13th-14th century Scottish noble.

David was the son of Michael Wemyss of Wemyss.

He performed fealty to King Edward I of England at Berwick upon Tweed in 1298, was a supporter of King Robert I of Scotland and signed the Declaration of Arbroath in 1320. David died in 1332.

== Family and issue ==
David married Marjory Ramsay, daughter of Walter Ramsey. He is known to have had the following known issue, to a number of wives:

- Micheal of Wemyss
- James of Bogie
