= Perth Castle =

Castle in Perth and Kinross, Scotland

- A sketch of the castle

Location
- Location within Perth and Kinross
- Coordinates: 56.3983°N 3.4294°W

Site history
- Built: 9th century

Perth Castle was a castle in Perth, Scotland, built in the 9th century. It was located near the northern end of today's Skinnergate. In the 19th century, there was a memorial to the castle in Castle Gable, which ran north-west from the castle's former location, today occupied by Perth Concert Hall.

== History ==
The Danes attacked the castle in the 9th century. A motte-and-bailey castle was built in the 12th century. The castle was once a royal residence. King Malcolm IV of Scotland was besieged at the castle in 1160 by Ferchar, Earl of Strathearn, and five other earls. A flood in 1209 damaged the castle and it became the residence of the Scottish Kings after the destruction of the Royal Palace in 1210. A further flood in 1290 damaged the motte mound and required the castle to be rebuilt. The castle was surrendered to the English in 1296. After it reverted to Scottish control, King Edward I of England captured the castle in 1298, 1300 and 1303. Besieged in 1306 and 1309 by Scottish forces, it withheld the sieges. It was captured in 1309 by Scottish forces and then by English forces in 1311. On 8 January 1313, the castle was captured by King Robert I of Scotland, who ordered the walls and castle to be destroyed. This was done to prevent the castle being used again by English forces garrisoning the castle against Scotland. Nothing remains above ground.

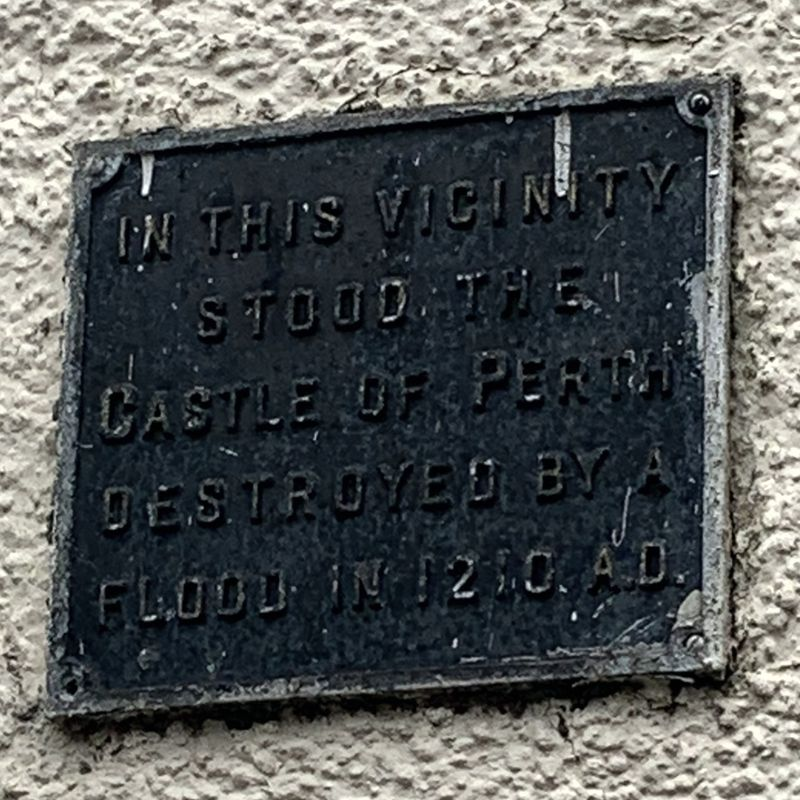
A plaque on a building in the city's North Port marking the approximate location.

== See also ==
- Gowrie House
- Spey Tower
