= Robert, Earl of Strathearn =

Coat of arms of the Earls of Strathearn

Robert of Strathearn (died c. 1244) was the 4th Earl of Strathearn in Scotland.

== Life ==
Robert was the fourth son of Gille Brigte of Strathearn and his first wife Matilda de Albini Brito. He first appears on record in 1199, when he and his brothers were witnesses to their father's charters to the Abbey of Inchaffray. By 1210, all three of his elder brothers had died, and he became heir to the earldom of Strathearn. In 1219 he confirmed as heir-apparent all his father's grants to the abbey, and after his accession as earl around 1223, he made a vow never to disturb the monks in their possessions.

Aside from his taking part in the abbey's affairs, he appears in a wider sphere in 1237, when he travelled to York with King Alexander II, to negotiate the Treaty of York with Henry III of England.

Earl Robert died before April 1244.

== Marriage and issue ==
Earl Robert's wife was named Matilda (1178-1247). They had three sons and two daughters:

- Malise II of Strathearn, who succeeded as Earl
- Hugh, who became a friar and died c. 1290
- Gille Brigte/Gilbert, who acquired the lands of Durie and Belnollo in Fife, become the progenitor of the Duries
- Annabella, who married firstly John of Restalrig, and secondly Sir Patrick Graham of Kincardine, who was killed at the Battle of Dunbar
- Mary, married Sir John Johnstone
- Matilda/Maud, who married Alexander, Earl of Menteith

== Bibliography ==
- Neville, Cynthia J. (2002). "Native Lords and the Church in Thirteenth-Century Strathearn, Scotland". The Journal of Ecclesiastical History. 53 (3 (July)). Cambridge University Press.
- Neville, Cynthia J. (2005). Native Lordship in Medieval Scotland: The Earldoms of Strathearn and Lennox, c. 1140-1365. Four Courts Press.
- Neville, Cynthia J. (2010). Land Law and People in Medieval Scotland. Edinburgh University Press.132
- Paul, James Balfour, Sir, "The Scots Peerage" (Edinburgh : D. Douglas 1911), vol. VIII, pp. 244–245

Preceded by Gille Brigte	Earl of Strathearn; 1223–1244	Succeeded by Malise II
