= Cynthia Neville =

Canadian historian

Cynthia J Neville, FRHistS, FSAScot is a Canadian historian, medievalist and George Munro professor of history at Dalhousie University in Halifax, Nova Scotia. Neville's primary research interests are the social, political and cultural history of medieval Scotland, 1000–1500, specifically legal history, Gaelic-Norman interactions and Gaelic lordship. She is also interested in English legal history from 1250 to 1500. Neville is currently working on a project concerning royal pardon in Scotland from 1100 to 1603.

== Publications ==
- Neville, Cynthia J. 'Land, Law and People in Medieval Scotland'. Edinburgh: Edinburgh University Press, 2010.
- Neville, Cynthia J. Native lordship in medieval Scotland : the earldoms of Strathearn and Lennox, c.1140-1365. Dublin : Four Courts Press, 2005. xv, 255 p. : maps; 24 cm. ISBN 1-85182-890-7
- Neville, Cynthia J. Violence, custom and law : the Anglo-Scottish border lands in the later Middle Ages. / Cynthia J. Neville. Edinburgh : Edinburgh University Press, c1998. xiv, 226 p.; 24 cm. ISBN 0-7486-1073-1

== Awards ==
- 2006 Margaret Wade Labarge Prize for the book, Native Lordship in Medieval Scotland from the Canadian Society of Medievalists.
- 2003-2004 winner of the Burgess Research Award.
