= Earl of Strathearn =

Scottish noble title

Earldom of Strathearn
- Arms of Prince William, Duke of Rothesay and Earl of Strathern
- Creation date: 12th century (ancient earls); 1562 (in the Peerage of Scotland)
- Peerage: Peerage of Scotland; Peerage of the United Kingdom
- First holder: Malise
- Present holder: Prince William
- Heir apparent: Prince George

Earl or Mormaer of Strathearn (Scottish Gaelic: Iarla Shrath Èireann) is a title of Scottish nobility, referring to the region of Strathearn in southern Perthshire. Of unknown origin, the mormaers are attested for the first time in a document perhaps dating to 1115. The first known mormaer, Malise I, is mentioned by Ailred of Rievaulx as leading native Scots in the company of King David at the Battle of the Standard, 1138. The last ruler of the Strathearn line was Malise, also Earl of Caithness and of Orkney, who had his earldom forfeited by King Edward Balliol. Edward Balliol created his guardian, John de Warenne, 7th Earl of Surrey, Earl of Strathearn in 1332, though this was in name only as the properties of the earldom were held by the Scots. In 1344 it was regranted by King David to Maurice de Moravia, a royal favourite who had a vague claim to the earldom as Malise's nephew and also stepfather.

Strathearn has since been used as a peerage title for James Stewart, an illegitimate son of King James V of Scotland, who was created Lord Abernethy and Strathearn and Earl of Moray in 1562. In 1631, William Graham, 7th Earl of Menteith was confirmed in this dignity as heir of line of Euphemia Stewart, Countess of Strathearn (died 1415), but was forced to settle for the less prestigious title of the Earl of Airth in 1633.

It has also been granted to members of the royal family in the titles of Duke of Cumberland and Strathearn (created 1766, extinct 1790), Duke of Kent and Strathearn (created 1799, extinct 1820) and Duke of Connaught and Strathearn (created 1874, extinct 1943).

On 29 April 2011, the title was recreated when Elizabeth II conferred the title on Prince William of Wales in the peerage of the United Kingdom. As a result, on marriage his wife Catherine became Countess of Strathearn. This was the title which William used when in Scotland until receiving the title of Duke of Rothesay in September 2022.

== Ancient Earls of Strathearn ==
Arms of House of Malise, Earls of Strathearn

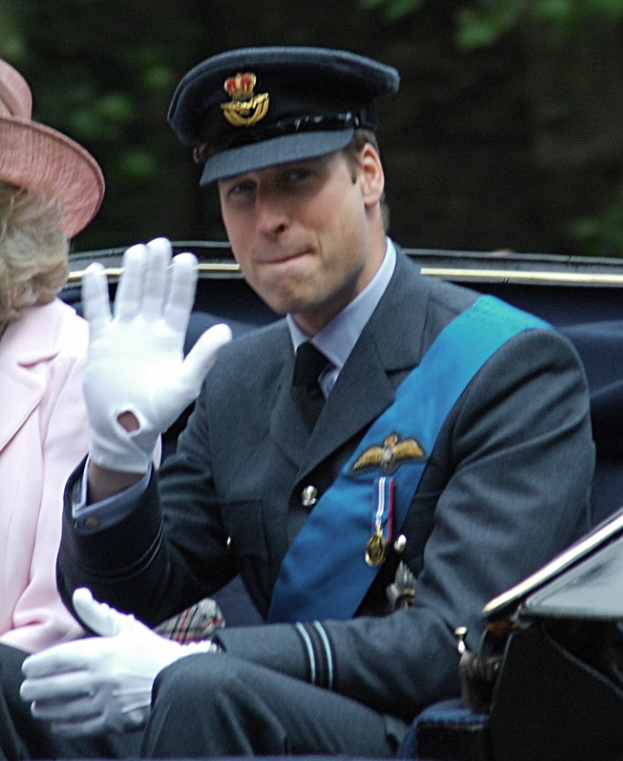
Prince William, Duke of Rothesay (pictured in 2010)

Standard of the Duke of Rothesay

- Malise I (fl. 1138)
- Ferteth (fl. 1160)
- Gille-Brigte or Gilbert (1171–1223)
- Robert (1223–1245)
- Malise II (1245–1271)
- Malise III (1271–1317), buried beside the high altar of Inchaffray Abbey
- Malise IV (1317–1329), captured his father
- Malise V (1330–1334) (d. 1350 as Earl of Caithness)

== Earls of Strathearn, Moray line beginning 1344 ==
- Maurice de Moravia, Earl of Strathearn (d.1346)

== Earls of Strathearn, Stewart/Graham line beginning 1357 ==
- Robert Stewart, Earl of Strathearn (1316–1390) (passed to son after becoming King Robert II in 1371)
- John de Warenne, 7th Earl of Surrey
- David Stewart, Earl of Strathearn (1355–1386)
- Euphemia Stewart, Countess of Strathearn (d.1415)
  - m. Patrick Graham
- Malise Graham, Earl of Strathearn (1410–after 1427), deprived of the peerage before 1427
- Walter Stewart, Earl of Strathearn (died 1437)

== Earls of Strathearn, Mountbatten-Windsor line beginning 2011 ==
- Prince William, Duke of Cambridge, Earl of Strathearn, Baron Carrickfergus (born 1982)

== See also ==
- Duke of Connaught and Strathearn
- Duke of Cumberland and Strathearn
- Duke of Kent and Strathearn

== Bibliography ==
- Neville, Cynthia J., Native Lordship in Medieval Scotland: the Earldoms of Strathearn and Lennox, c. 1140–1365, Dublin: Four Courts Press, 2005 ISBN 1-85182-890-7
  - --do.--The Earls of Strathearn from the twelfth to the mid fourteenth century, with an edition of their written acts. 2 vols. 1983. PhD thesis, University of Aberdeen. (http://digitool.abdn.ac.uk:80/webclient/Deliv...&pid=130786)
