= Strathearn =

Strath (valley) of the River Earn, Scotland

Coordinates: 56°19′57″N 3°40′57″W

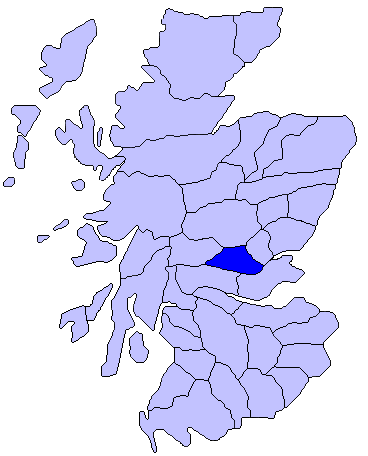
Map of Scotland showing the province of Strathearn

Strathearn or Strath Earn (/stræθˈɜːrn/, Scottish Gaelic: Srath Èireann), also the Earn Valley, is the strath of the River Earn, which flows from Loch Earn to meet the River Tay in the east of Scotland.

The area covers the 30-mile (50-kilometre) stretch of the river, containing a number of settlements in Perthshire. It shares a name with a modern ward used for elections to Perth and Kinross Council.

Strathearn was also the name of an ancient province of the Kingdom of Alba, under the authority of a mormaer and then an Earl. More recently, the name has since been used in a number of titles used by the British royal family.

== History ==
The historic province of Strathearn was bounded on the north by Atholl, north west by Breadalbane, south west by Menteith, south east by Fife, and on the east by Perthia.

The earliest attested mormaer of Strathearn is Mael Ísu I, who is recorded fighting alongside David I at the Battle of the Standard in 1138. Unlike some provinces where the holder of the office of mormaer rotated between kin-groups, the mormaership of Strathearn was dominated by a single family, with a Mael Ísu in every generation until the death of Mael Ísu V in the mid 14th century.

=== Battle of Strathearn ===
Battle of Strathearn
Date	904
Location	Strathearn, Scotland
Result	Scottish victory

Belligerents
Kingdom of Scotland	Uí Ímair

Commanders and leaders
Constantine II of Scotland	Ímar ua Ímair † and more descendants of Ímar

In 904, during the reign of Constantine II of Scotland, sons of Bárid mac Ímair sent a Danish army to attack Strathearn, and were ultimately defeated, the Kingdom of Scotland wasn't attacked by Vikings for the next 50 years.

=== Modern administrative history ===
Strathearn became a stewartry under the authority of the Earls of Perth and part of Perthshire for administrative purposes, until the abolition of heritable jurisdictions in 1748. It continued to be recognised as one of the ancient divisions of the county, without administrative or judicial function.

The Strathearn ward of Perth and Kinross Council was created in 2007.

== Geography ==
=== Settlements ===
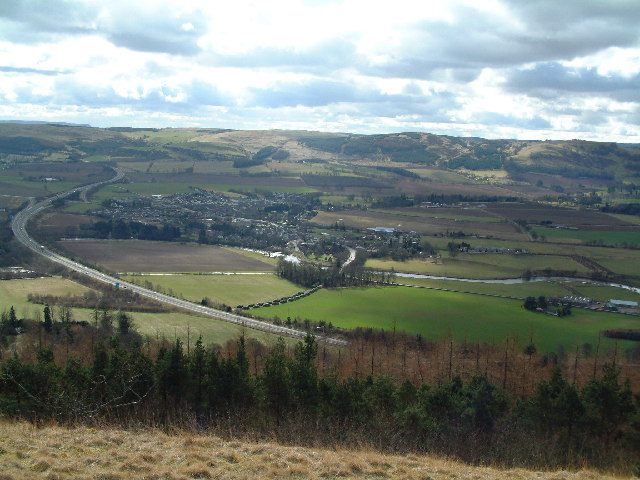
Bridge of Earn, in Lower Strathearn, positioned on the River Earn.

The primary settlements of Strathearn are:

- Lochearnhead
- St Fillans
- Comrie
- Crieff
- Muthill
- Auchterarder
- Dunning
- Forteviot
- Forgandenny
- Bridge of Earn
- Abernethy

== Royal title ==
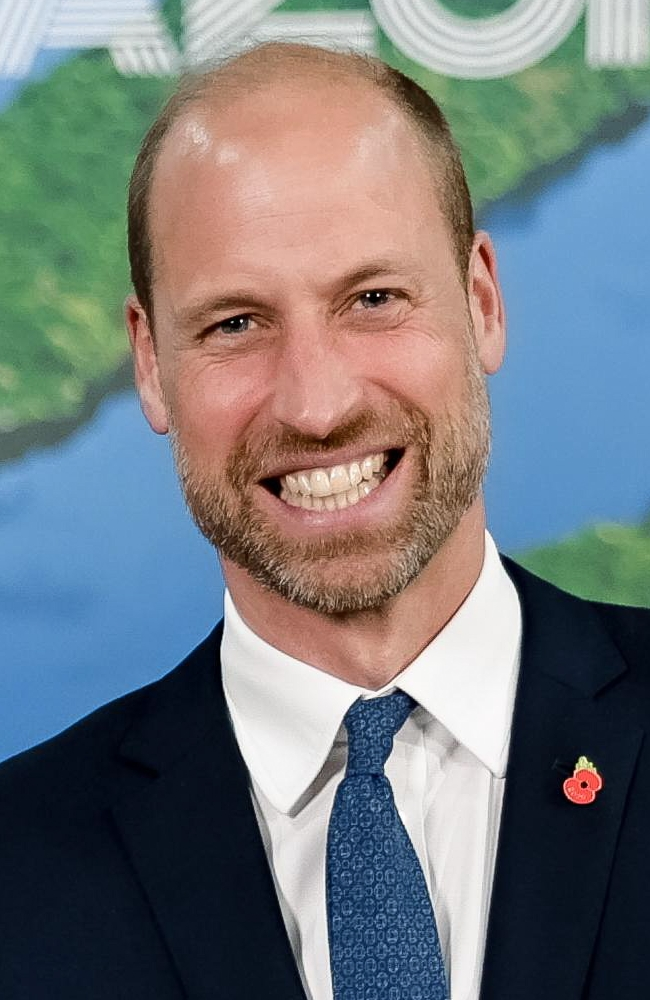
Prince William, current Earl of Strathearn.

Following the demise of the ancient Earls of Strathearn, with the title in its later creation being forfeited by Walter Stewart, Earl of Atholl, the Strathearn title was resurrected for use for a number of Royal dukedoms, awarded to members of the British royal family.

The name appeared in the titles of the Duke of Cumberland and Strathearn, Duke of Kent and Strathearn and Duke of Connaught and Strathearn.

More recently, Prince William, now Prince of Wales and Duke of Rothesay, was created Earl of Strathearn, as a subsidiary title to Duke of Cambridge, on 29 April 2011, the day of his wedding to Catherine Middleton.

== Other uses ==
- "Strathearn" / "Strathern" is also a surname in the United States and Northern Ireland, predominantly in the Bellaghy area of County Londonderry.

== See also ==
- List of places in Perth and Kinross
- Medieval Diocese of Dunblane (or Strathearn)

== Bibliography ==
- Broun, Dauvit (2015). "Statehood and lordship in 'Scotland' before the midtwelfth century". Innes Review. 66 (1): 1–71. doi:10.3366/inr.2015.0084.
- MacQueen, Hector L. (2008). "Scotland: Politics, Government and Law". In Rigby, S. H. (ed.). A Companion to Britain in the Later Middle Ages. Chichester: John Wiley & Sons. pp. 283–308. ISBN 978-0470998779.
