= David de Graham =

David de Graham may refer to:

- Sir David de Graham of Dundaff (died c. 1272), Scottish noble
- David de Graham of Lovat (died 1297), Scottish noble and soldier
- Sir David de Graham of Kincardine (died 1327), Scottish noble

== See also ==
- David Graham (disambiguation)
