= Falkirk Old Parish Church =

- Falkirk Old & St. Modan's Parish Church
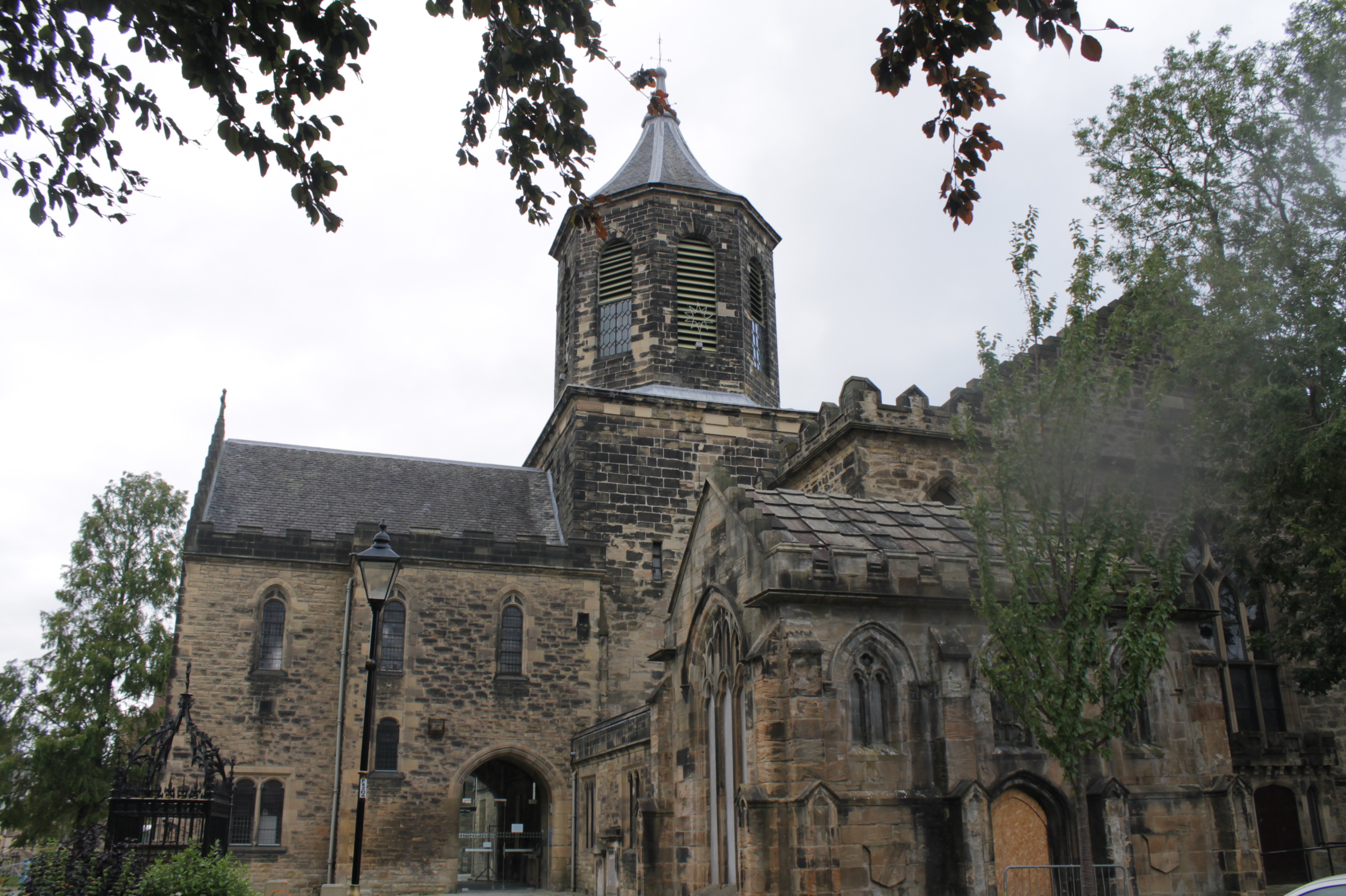
- Falkirk Old Parish Church

- The church within Falkirk council area
- 56°00′01″N 3°47′09″W
- Location: Falkirk
- Country: Scotland
- Denomination: Church of Scotland
- Website: falkirktrinity.org.uk

History
- Status: Parish church
- Dedication: Saint Modan

Architecture
- Functional status: Active
- Heritage designation: Category A listed building
- Designated: 21 March 1960

Falkirk Old & St. Modan's Parish Church, also known as "Falkirk Trinity Church", is a congregation of the Church of Scotland in Falkirk, central Scotland. The medieval old parish church is located in the centre of Falkirk, and may have been founded as early as the 7th century. The church was largely rebuilt in the 19th century, though the 18th-century steeple was retained. The church building is protected as a category A listed building.

== History ==
Some time after the sixth century the speckled church or Faw Kirk was founded, it is from this church that the town of Falkirk takes its name. Malcolm Canmore, King of Scotland, is also said to have established a church here in 1057. In 1166 the church was given to Holyrood Abbey. The earliest parts of the present building date to around 1450, and indicate that the medieval church was on a cruciform plan, with a tower at the centre.

The tower was rebuilt between 1738 and 1741 to designs by the architect William Adam. Proposals for renovation or extension of the church were put forward from the 1790s, and lengthy disagreements ensued. In 1810 the matter came before the Court of Session, which ruled that the tower should be retained, but the remaining medieval building should be demolished and replaced. The proposals of James Gillespie Graham were adopted, and the contract was awarded to William Black, wright and Henry Taylor, mason. By autumn 1811 the works were completed, at a cost of around £3,500. A session house was added on the south side in 1893, designed by Wardrop & Anderson.

The Old Parish Church merged in 1986 with St Modan's Parish Church to form the present congregation.

A number of medieval carved stones are preserved inside the church, including effigies of nobles, which formerly crowned tombs which presumably stood within the medieval church building, and a 12th-century cross-head.

== Burials ==
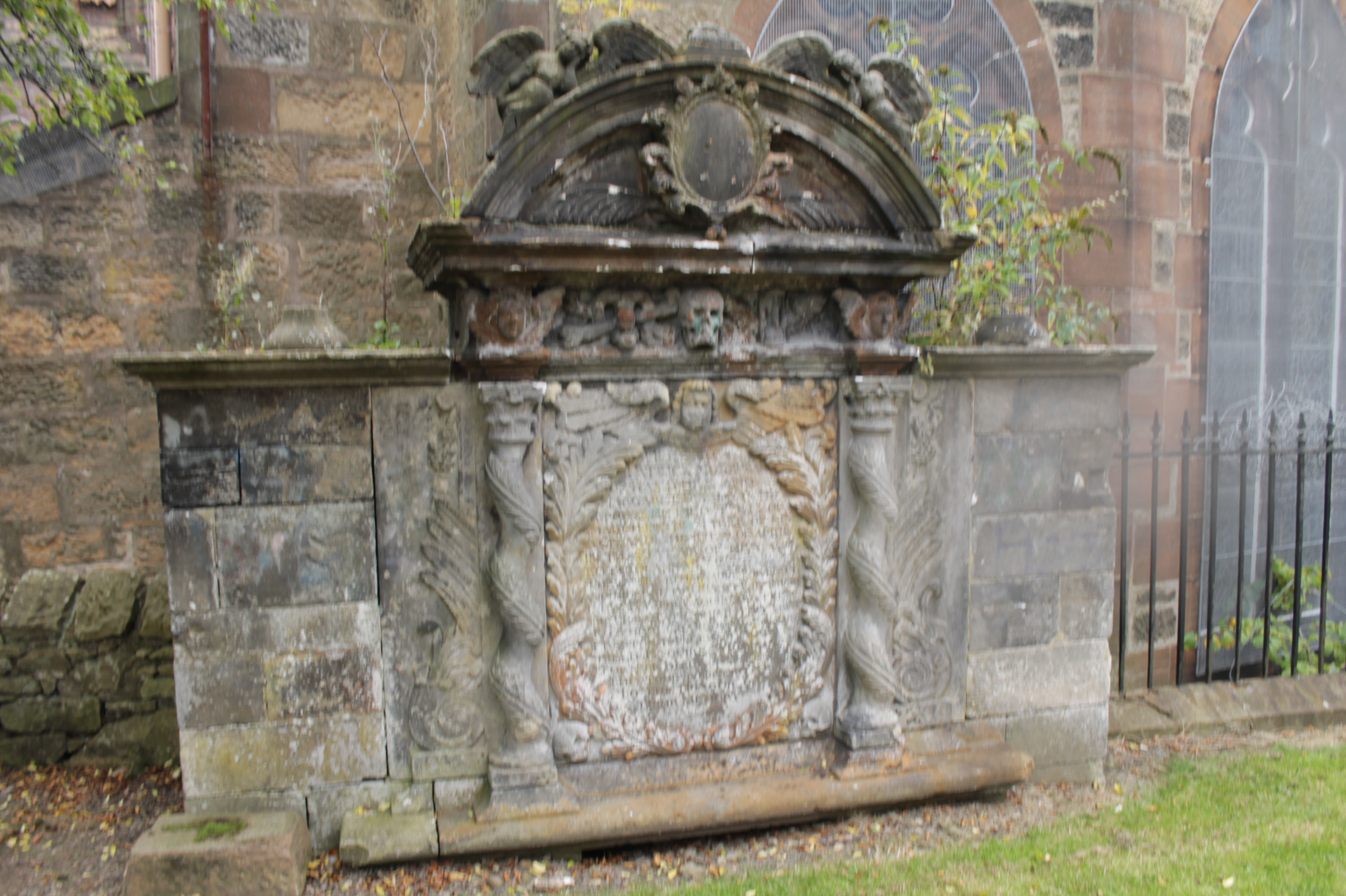
The grave of Patrick Murehead of Rashyhill, Trinity Church, Falkirk

Notable tombs in the churchyard include:

- Sir John de Graeme, who was killed at the Battle of Falkirk on 22 July 1298. His gravestone has been replaced twice over the centuries. The present slab is said to be a copy of the original, and bears the inscription:

Here lyes Sir John the Grame, baith wight and wise,
Ane of the chiefs who rescewit Scotland thrise,
Ane better knight not to the world was lent,
Nor was gude Graham of truth and hardiment

- Sir John Stewart of Bonkyll, also killed at the Battle of Falkirk is buried here. Stewart was the direct male ancestor of James VI of Scotland and therefore of the present Royal Family.
- Patrick Murehead of Rashyhill (d.1723)
- Sir Robert Munro, 6th Baronet (d.1746)
