= Rosneath =

Village in Argyll and Bute, Scotland

Coordinates: 56.009950°N 4.8013940°W

Rosneath: Scottish Gaelic: Ros Neimhidh
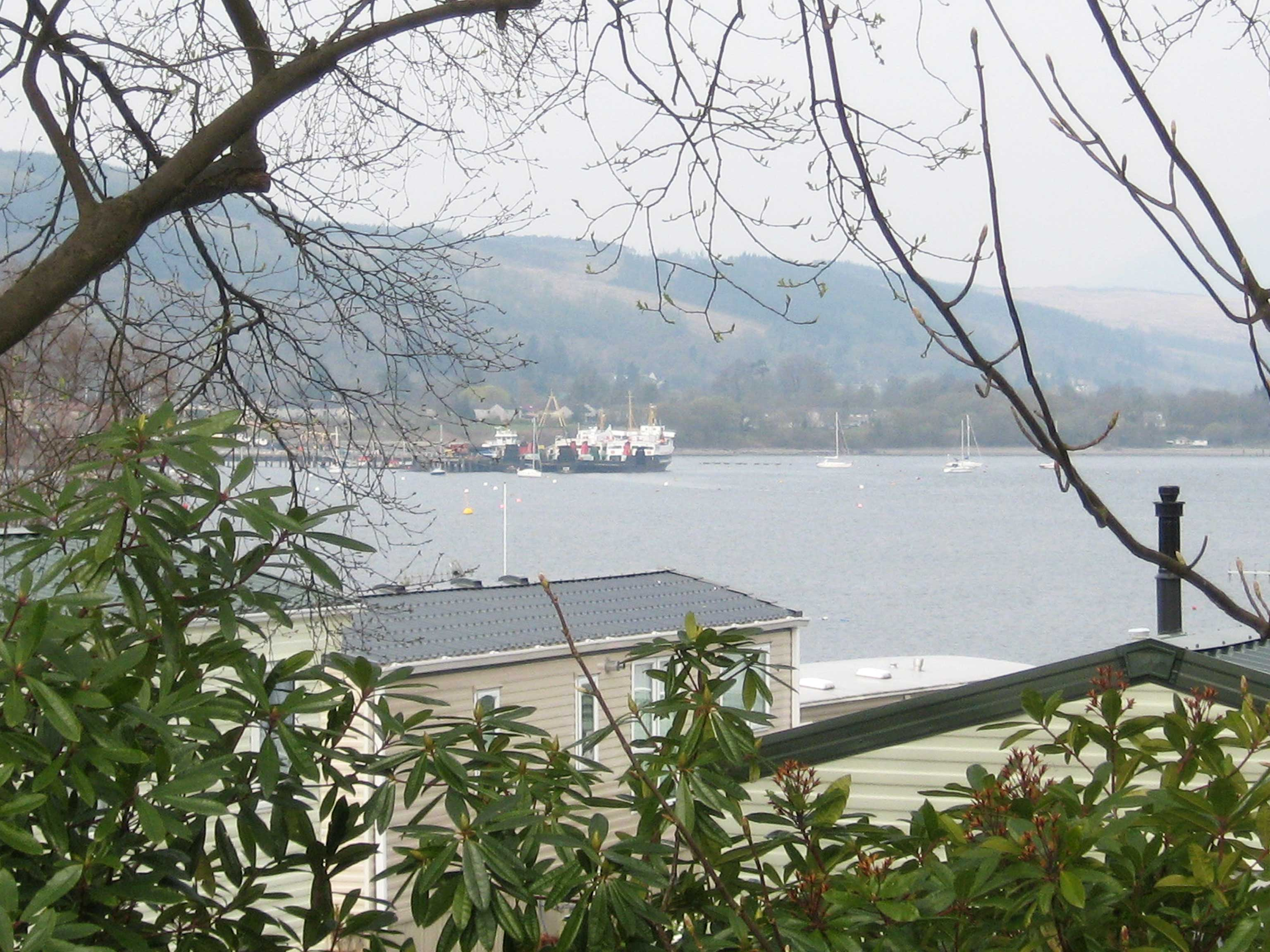
- View from caravan site at Castle Point, looking northwest across Rosneath Bay to the pier and village

- Location within Argyll and Bute
- Population: 1,260 (2020)
- OS grid reference: NS 25447 83210
- Council area: Argyll and Bute
- Lieutenancy area: Dunbartonshire
- Country: Scotland
- Sovereign state: United Kingdom
- Post town: Helensburgh
- Postcode district: G84
- Dialling code: 01436
- Police: Scotland
- Fire: Scottish
- Ambulance: Scottish
- UK Parliament: Argyll, Bute and South Lochaber
- Scottish Parliament: Dumbarton

Rosneath (Scottish Gaelic: Ros Neimhidh) is a village in Argyll and Bute, Scotland. A 2025 study declared it to be a town but this is controversial. It sits on the western shore of the Gare Loch, 2 miles (3 kilometres) northwest of Rosneath Point at the tip of the Rosneath Peninsula, where the loch meets the Firth of Clyde. The village is about 2.4 miles (4 kilometres) by road from the village of Kilcreggan, which is sited further west on the southern shore of the peninsula.

The Gare Loch narrows at Rosneath to under half a mile (around 600 metres) at a place known as the Rhu Narrows, after the village of Rhu on the eastern shore of the loch.

Rosneath Bay to the south of the village curves eastward to Castle Point, near the site of the former Roseneath Castle, in the grounds of the former Rosneath House which was in the area now occupied by Rosneath caravan park. The coast turns south past Culwatty Bay to Rosneath Point at the tip of the peninsula, and this whole area formed the site of Rosneath naval base during WW2. Rosneath Point is directly north of Greenock Ocean Terminal which occupies the site of the former Greenock Princes Pier and railway station complex, 2 miles (3 kilometres) distant on the southern shore of the Firth.

== History ==
The Rosneath area has been settled from at least 600 onwards, when St. Modan, a travelling missionary, founded a church there. The name Rosneath may have its roots in this era, being derived from the Gaelic Ros Neimhidh, meaning "promontory of consecrated ground". The name has historically been spelled as Roseneath (notably in both the First and New (or Second) Statistical Accounts of Scotland). A more visible example is Roseneath Street in Greenock, which looks over the River Clyde to Rosneath Point, and dates from around 1870.

Later, the area was heavily fortified, with Rosneath's own castling joining those of nearby Faslane and Shandon (located at Faslane and Shandon), all of which are long since gone. Rosneath village did not yet fully exist by this time; instead, Rosneath parish was home to many free-standing dwellings, the occupants of which were, for the vast bulk of the area's history, employed in agriculture and fishing. Frequent shipping services to Glasgow, Greenock and beyond were vital for the local economy.

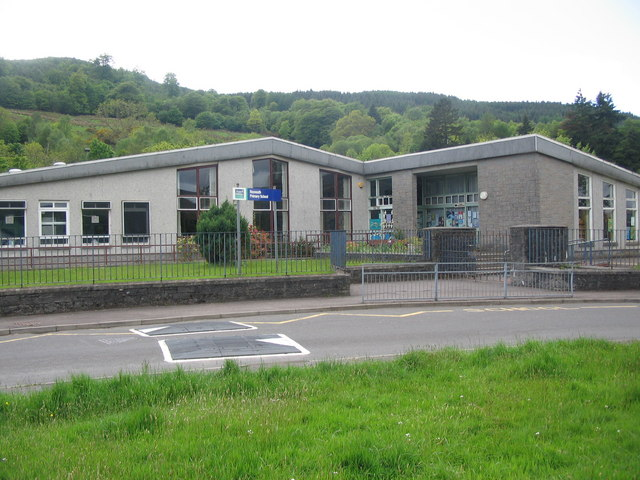
Rosneath Primary School

Rosneath Castle was ruined and rebuilt many times; the final rebuilding, as Rosneath House, came in 1803–06, three years after the previous building burned down. Located further uphill from previous versions, it belonged to the Duke of Argyll, whose family retained it until Princess Louise died in 1939. In stark contrast to the earlier castles, it was in the Romanesque Revival style.

From 1941 to 1945, Rosneath was home to an important naval base known as Rosneath naval base, thanks to its location in the well-sheltered natural harbour of the Gare Loch. The Americans used Rosneath Castle as a base of operations. The castle was then abandoned and the remains demolished in 1961.

The Rosneath Peninsula was formerly in the traditional County of Dunbarton until local government reorganisation moved it into the Argyll and Bute council area in 1996.

== Population ==
At the 2001 census, its population was 931. Rosneath lies approximately 44 mi (71 km) from Glasgow by road. It is situated on the B833, a shoreside minor thoroughfare that serves the peninsula.

== Notable people ==
- John Anderson, the 18th century scientist, educational pioneer and radical who founded what became the University of Strathclyde, was born in Rosneath where his father served as minister of the parish church.
- The founder of the first Rangers F.C. team, Moses McNeil, lived at Clynder, just outside Rosneath. He was buried at the Old Churchyard of Rosneath in 1938. His death went unnoticed at the time by the media and he had nothing to leave in his will. Moses final resting place has been marked with a plaque by Rangers and members of the local community.
- Princess Louise, Duchess of Argyll, the daughter of Queen Victoria, was the last resident of Rosneath House.
- William de Bois Maclaren, publisher, businessman and Scout Commissioner, purchased Gilwell Park in Essex and donated it to The Scout Association in 1919.

== See also ==
- List of places in Argyll and Bute
