= Baikie =

Baikie is a surname. Notable people with the surname include:

- Adamu Baikie (1931–2025), Nigerian university administrator
- David Baikie (born 1953), Scottish former football player
- Iain Baikie (born 1960), Scottish physicist
- Jim Baikie (1940–2017), Scottish comics artist
- Mary Anne Baikie (1861–1950), Scottish suffragist
- Peter Baikie (born 1957), Scottish comedian and composer
- Robert Baikie (died 1817), Scottish politician from Orkney, Member of Parliament (MP) for Orkney and Shetland 1780–81
- William Balfour Baikie (1824–1864), Scottish explorer, naturalist, and philologist

== Places ==
- Baikie Castle in Angus, Scotland, U.K.
