= William de Fenton =

Fenton of Baikey arms; Argent, three crescents gules.

Sir William de Fenton (c. 1235 – 1315), Lord of Baikie and Beaufort, was a 13th-14th century Scottish noble.

== Early life ==
William was born in Beaufort, Perthshire, Scotland, in 1235. He was one of Robert de Brus, Lord of Annandale's auditors during the arbitration for the Crown of Scotland between 1291 and 1292.

He performed homage to King Edward I of England at Berwick-upon-Tweed on 28 August 1296. He also performed fealty to Edward I on 14 March 1304 at St. Andrews. His coat of arms was "Argent, three crescents gules".

Through his marriage to Cecilia Bissett, daughter and co-heiress of John Bissett of Lovat, Beaufort passed into the Fenton family.

== Family and issue ==
He married Cecilia Bissett, daughter and co-heiress of John Bissett of Lovat, and is known to have had the following issue:

- John de Fenton
- Alice de Fenton, married to Henry St Clair, and had issue

== Death ==
He died in 1315 at an advanced age, estimated to be between 75 and 85 years. His life and titles contributed to the legacy of the Fenton family in Scotland.
