= David de Graham of Dundaff =

13th-century Scottish noble

Coat of arms of Sir David de Graham of Dundaff, Argent, on a chief Sable, three escallops Or

Sir David de Graham of Dundaff was a 13th-century Scottish noble.

== Life ==
David served Patrick, Earl of Dunbar, and was the deputy justiciar of Lothian in 1248. He was Sheriff of Berwick by 1264. He died c. 1272.

== Marriage and issue ==
David married Agnes Noble and is known to have had the following issue:

- Patrick de Graham (died 1296), married Annabella, widow of John of Restalrig, the daughter of Robert, Earl of Strathearn, and wife Matilda; had issue.
- John de Graham (died 1298), married Marjory Halliday; had issue.
- David de Graham (died 1297), married Mary Bisset, the co-heiress of John Bisset, Lord of Lovat; had issue.
