= John de Graham =

Scottish knight and soldier (died 1298)

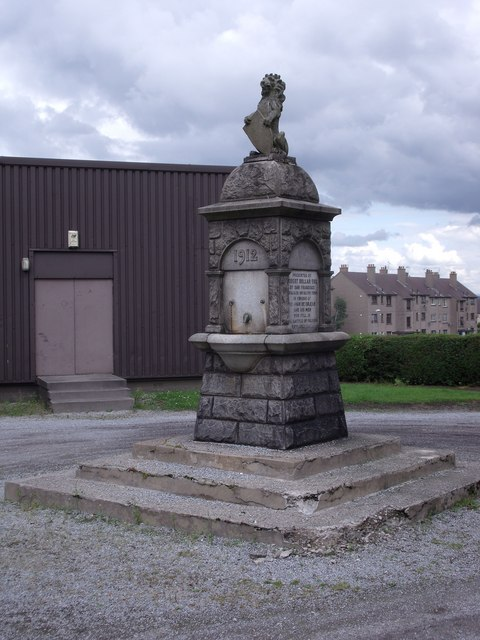
Memorial to Sir John de Graham

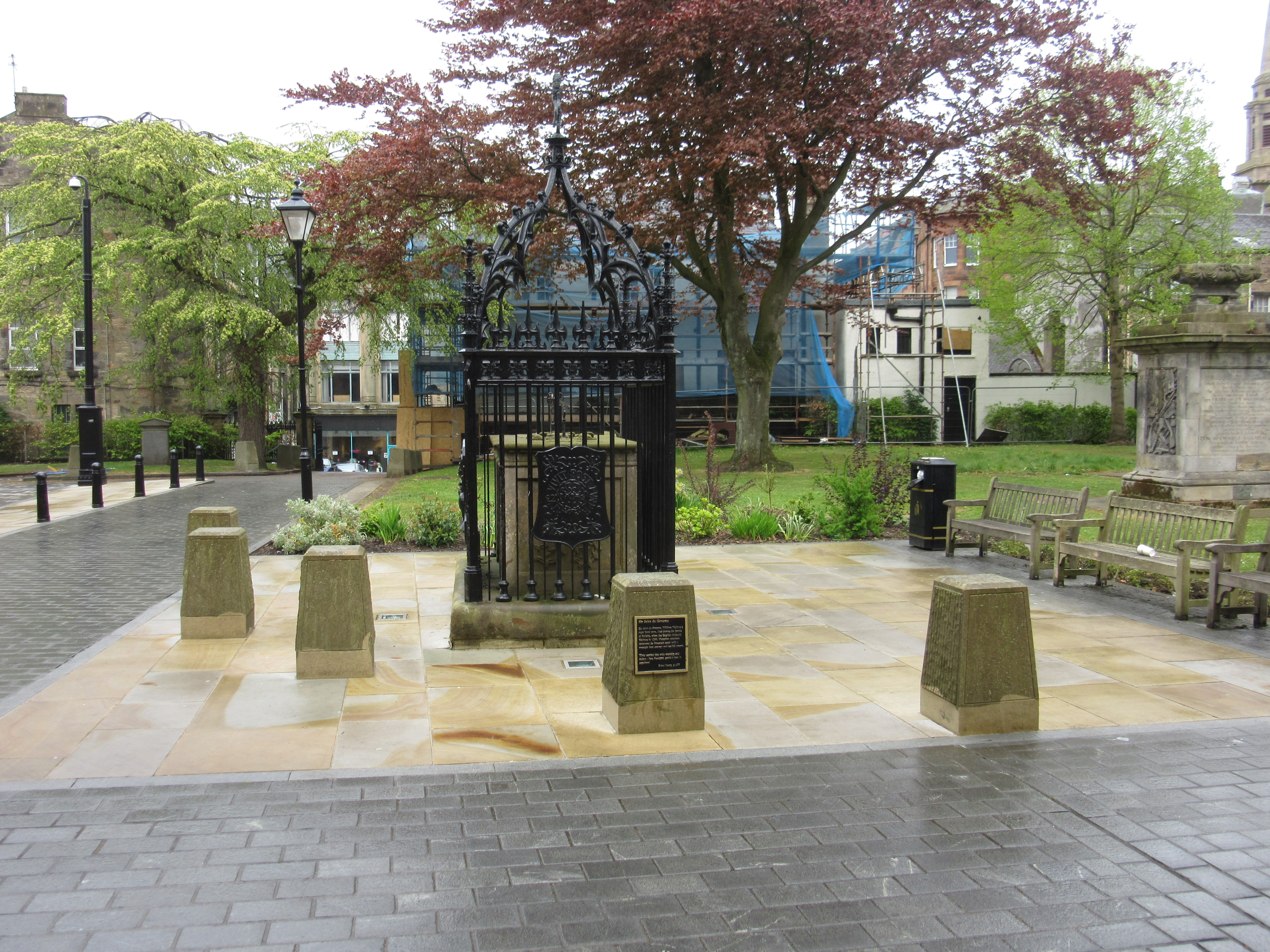
Sir John de Graham’s tomb, Falkirk Old Parish Church

Sir John de Graham (died 22 July 1298) of Dundaff was a 13th-century Scottish noble. He was killed during the Battle of Falkirk.

He was the son of David de Graham and Agnes Noble and was born in the lands of Dundaff, Stirlingshire, Scotland. During the Wars of Scottish Independence he fought alongside Sir William Wallace. Sir John de Graham fought at Stirling Bridge and Falkirk. He was one of several notable Scottish casualties at the Battle of Falkirk, along with Sir John Stewart, Lord of Bonkyll on 22 July 1298, when the Scottish forces were routed by Edward I of England's stronger force of cavalry.

He is buried at the Falkirk Old Parish Church, Stirlingshire, Falkirk, Scotland, with other fallen comrades. Sir John's gravestone and effigy can be found in Falkirk Old Parish Church. The inscription reads:

Here lyes Sir John the Grame, baith wight and wise,
Ane of the chiefs who rescewit Scotland thrise,
Ane better knight not to the world was lent,
Nor was gude Graham of truth and hardiment

The 15th-century poet Blind Harry wrote of "Schir Jhone the Grayme" in The Wallace. Wallace's lament at his death is considered to be one of the best bits in the poem.

He gives his name to the Grahamston district in Falkirk, which gives its name to Falkirk Grahamston railway station.

A memorial fountain is located in Victoria Park Falkirk marking the spot where Sir John de Graham fell. A local historical Society has been created to promote the Scottish knight called "The Society of John De Graeme."

== Family and issue ==
John married Marjory Halliday, and had the following known issue:

- John, Earl of Mentieth (d. 1347), married Mary II, suo jure Countess of Menteith, the daughter of Alan II, Earl of Menteith; had issue.
