= David Graham =

David Graham may refer to:

== Authors and intellectuals ==
- David Graham (American poet) (born 1953), American writer and poet
- David Graham (author) (1919–1994), pen name of British writer Robert Hale
- David Graham (Canadian academic), Canadian academic administrator and literary historian
- David Crockett Graham (1884–1961), American Baptist minister and polymath
- David Maurice Graham (1911–1999), British broadcaster

== Sports ==
- David Graham (Irish cricketer) (1922–2009), Northern Irish cricketer
- David Graham (English cricketer) (born 1971), English cricketer
- David Graham (footballer, born 1978), Scottish footballer
- David Graham (footballer, born 1983), Scottish footballer
- David Graham (golfer) (born 1946), Australian golfer
- David Graham (rugby union) (1875–1962), English rugby football player
- David Graham (tennis) (born 1962), Australian former professional tennis player
- Dave Graham (American football) (born 1939), former professional American football player
- Dave Graham (climber) (born 1981), American professional rock climber

== Arts ==
- David Graham (actor) (1925–2024), British character actor and voice artist
- David Graham (photographer) (born 1952), American photographer
- Davey Graham (1940–2008), English guitarist
- David Graham (casting director) (1924–2015), American casting director
- David Graham, "housemate" who appeared in Big Brother Australia 2006

== Others ==
- David de Burgh Graham (born 1981), Canadian Member of Parliament
- David Graham (epidemiologist), United States FDA official who testified against Vioxx and the structuring of the FDA
- David Graham (architect) (born 1953), American architect
- David Graham (US politician) (born 1954), candidate for attorney general of Delaware
- David Graham, former cadet at the US Air Force Academy convicted of murder alongside Diane Zamora

== See also ==
- David de Graham (disambiguation)
