= Andrew de Bosco =

Scottish nobleman

Andrew de Bosco, (Note: Surname also spelt Bois or Boyce) Lord of Redcastle and Kilvarock was a 13th-century Scottish noble and soldier.

Through his marriage to Elizabeth, a co-heiress of John Bissett of Lovat, Redcastle and Kilvarock passed into the Bosco family. He died before 1291, being succeeded by John de Bosco. John died during the Irish campaign of Edward Bruce.

The lands of Kilvarock passed via Maria, daughter or grand daughter of Andrew to Hugh Rose.
