= Patrick de Graham of Lovat =

13th-14th century Scottish noble

Sir Patrick de Graham of Lovat was a 13th-14th century Scottish noble.

Patrick was the son of David de Graham of Lovat and Mary Bisset. He was a prisoner of King Edward I of England between 1306 until 1308. He signed the Declaration of Arbroath in 1320. Patrick was a ward of Robert de Felton, after the death of his father and married a daughter of John of Argyll, without license. Patrick fought and was taken prisoner at the Battle of Halidon Hill in 1333.
