= Dundaff Castle, Stirling =

Dundaff Castle

Site information
- Condition: ruined

Location
- Location within Stirling
- Coordinates: 56.047288°N 4.1186451°W

Site history
- Built: 12th century

Dundaff Castle, also known as Sir John de Graham Castle or Graham's Castle, is a ruined 12th century square motte and bailey castle in the Stirling council area, Scotland. The castle was the caput baronium of the Barony of Dundaff.

Sir David de Graham was known to be in possession of the barony of Dundaff in 1237. Identified as the peel tower of Sir John de Graham, who died at the Battle of Falkirk in 1298.
