= John de Fenton =

Fenton of Baikey arms; Argent, three crescents gules.

Sir John de Fenton was a 14th-century Scottish noble.

He was the son of William de Fenton, Lord of Baikie and Beaufort and Cecilia Bisset, the co-heiress of John Bisset, Lord of Lovat. John succeeded to his father's estates.

John campaigned with King Robert I of Scotland against William, Earl of Ross in 1308 and was a witness at the submission of William, Earl of Ross to King Robert I. He was at the Scottish parliament of 1309 at St. Andrews. Fenton signed the Declaration of Arbroath in 1320 and attached his seal. His seal however is no longer attached to the document.
