= David Graham (Canadian academic) =

Canadian academic administrator and literary historian

David Graham is a Canadian academic administrator and literary historian who has served in a number of Canadian universities. He is the former Provost and Vice-President, Academic affairs, at Concordia University in Montreal, Quebec. Prior to that role, he served as the university's Dean of the Faculty of Arts and Science. Before working at Concordia, he held the positions of Professor, Department Head (French and Spanish Department) and later Dean of Arts at Memorial University of Newfoundland. His research is primarily concerned with the early modern French emblem books.

== Publications ==
- Graham, D., ed. (2001). An interregnum of the sign: the emblematic age in France: essays in honour of Daniel S. Russell. Glasgow emblem studies, 6. Glasgow: Glasgow Emblem Studies.
