= John Stewart (knight, died 1298) =

Scottish knight and military commander

Arms of John Stewart (d. 1298): Sir John differenced his arms from the arms of the High Stewards of Scotland by a bend gules as shown on his seal from the Ragman Rolls of 1292 and 1296, with the tinctures shown on the Collins Roll of 1295.

Sir John Stewart (died 22 July 1298), the brother of Sir James the 5th High Steward of Scotland, was a Scottish knight and military commander during the First Scottish War of Independence.

== Origins ==
Sir John was the second son of Alexander Stewart, 4th High Steward of Scotland (d. 1283). The Scots Peerage states that Sir Alexander's wife was Jean, the daughter of James (d. 1210), lord of Bute. Sir John was an uncle of James Douglas, Lord of Douglas, also known as "The Black Douglas".

== Heraldry ==
The strongest evidence for Sir John's coat of arms comes from the wax impression of his seal in the Ragman Rolls of 1296. In heraldic terms, the blazon shown on the wax impression (excluding colors) is "a fess chequy surmounted with a bend." The distinguishing feature of Sir John's arms from the arms of the High Stewards of Scotland (his brother, father, grandfather, and great-grandfather) is therefore the bend, or diagonal stripe: a plain bend with no charges on it. An anonymous shield in the Collin's Roll ca. 1295 almost certainly belongs to Sir John. The blazon is "or, a fess chequy argent and azure surmounted by a bend gules."

In his 1722 "System of Heraldry," Sir Alexander Nesbit, a 17th-18th century Scottish antiquarian, incorrectly described the arms as "or, a fess cheque, azure and argent, surmounted of a bend sable, charged with three buckles or" and also incorrectly assumed that Sir John inherited the styling "of Bonkyll," an error that was subsequently repeated by Sir Robert Douglas in his 1764 "Peerage of Scotland."

== Styling ==
While some later writers styled Sir John as "of Bonkyll," since he was the ancestor of the "Stewarts of Bonkyll," no contemporary evidence exists to suggest he was ever styled as such. On the contrary, Sir Alexander de Bonkyll died by the end of April 1300, and his daughter Margaret did not inherit the titles and lands of her father until after her reconciliation with Edward I in July 1304.

Medieval documents most commonly refer to Sir John as "the brother of James the Steward of Scotland" or some variant. He is also referred to as "knight," and is listed among the nearly 50 "barons of the realm of Scotland." A charter from 1296 mentions a donation to be rendered from Sir John's lands, but no territorial designation for him can be found in any medieval texts. Therefore, referencing him as "Sir John Stewart, brother of James the Steward of Scotland," or some variant is the preferred designator, consistent with contemporary medieval documents.

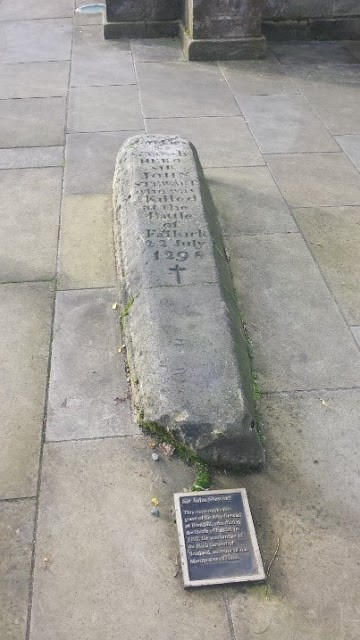
The gravestone of Sir John Stewart (d. 1298). The gravestone is original from the end of the 13th century, and the inscription dates from the 19th century. It reads: "Here lies a Scottish hero, Sir John Stewart, who was killed at the battle of Falkirk, 22nd July, 1298 †."

== Career ==
As a baron of Scotland, Sir John participated in governmental affairs of Scotland, including confirmation of the Treaty of Salisbury, and was among those requesting Edward I of England to certify the papal dispensation to permit the marriage of his son Edward II to Margaret of Norway, the heir presumptive to the Scottish throne after the death of her grandfather Alexander III of Scotland.

After the tragic death of Margaret of Norway, the forced abdication of John Balliol, and the English invasion of Scotland in 1296, John's relations with Edward I of England soured and he came to support the Scottish cause against the English occupation during the First Scottish War of Independence.

A letter from 1297 indicates that Edward I of England considered Sir John, along with his brother Sir James the Steward of Scotland, and Sir Robert the Bruce, Earl of Carrick, as the primary threats to his rule of Scotland. In the letter, he charges the English treasurer in Scotland, Sir Hugh de Cressingham, to employ all the skill he has with the funds provided him to capture them to end the insurrection.

On 22 July 1298, the feast day of Saint Mary Magdalene, the English army under Edward I discovered the Scottish host led by Sir William Wallace and attacked. At the Battle of Falkirk, Sir John Stewart, the brother of the Steward of Scotland, commanded the Scottish archers; Sir William Wallace, the Guardian of Scotland, commanded the infantry; and Sir John Comyn, the nephew of King John Balliol, commanded the cavalry. After the initial skirmish with the English cavalry, the Scottish cavalry under Sir John Comyn fled the battlefield, leaving the archers fully exposed. The Scots resisted the attacks of the English cavalry for a time until the cavalry charged through the Scottish archers, killing their commander, Sir John Stewart. After falling from his horse, the archers rallied around the body of their fallen lord and were killed to the man.

After the battle, Sir John Stewart was buried in the churchyard of the Falkirk Old Parish Church.

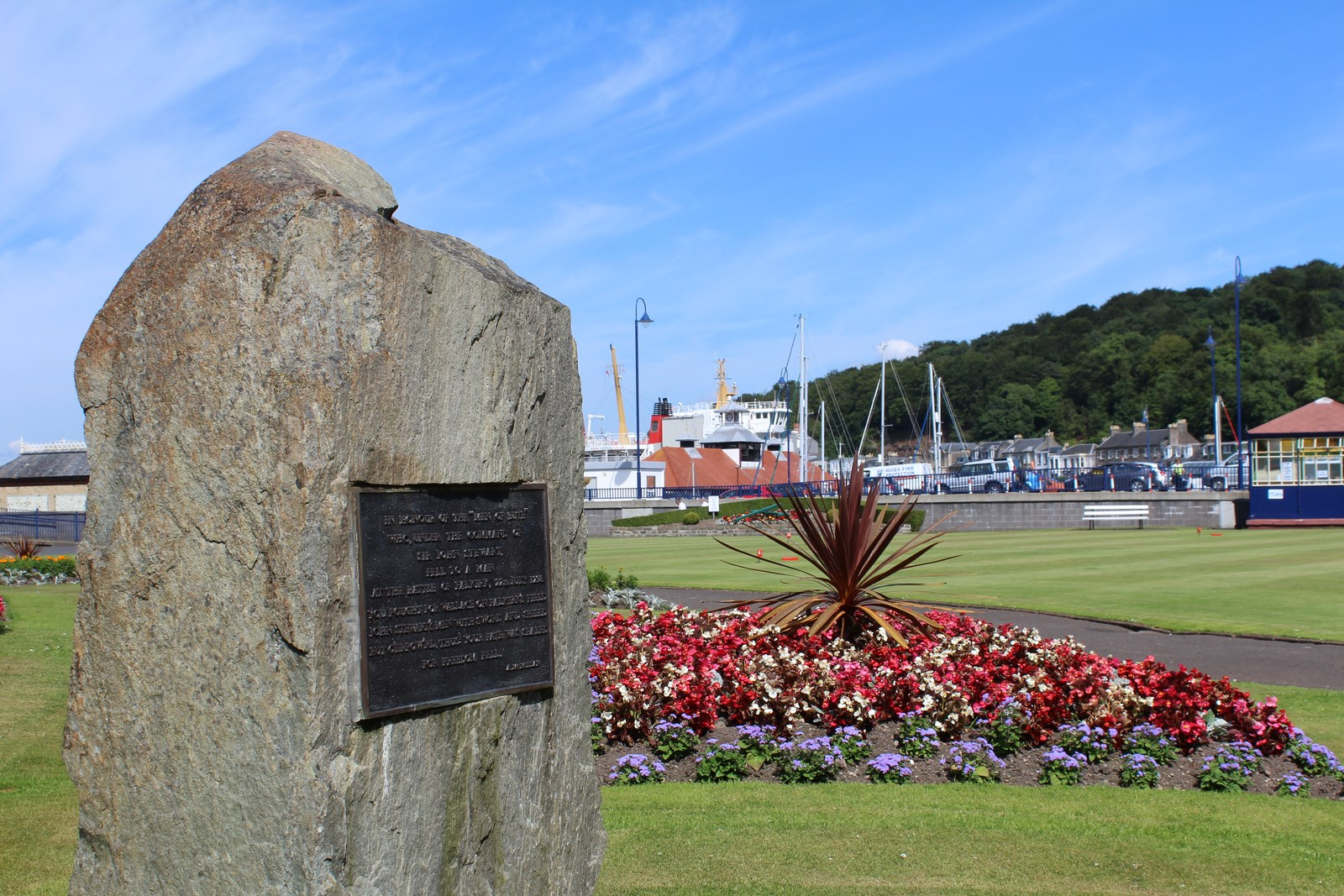
Memorial Stone, Esplanade Gardens, Rothesay, inscribed: In honour of the Men of Bute who, under the command of Sir John Stewart, fell to a man at the Battle of Falkirk, 22nd July 1298. Who fought for Wallace on Falkirk's field, John Stewart's men with sword and shield, But o'er pow'rd thus! Their fate was sealed, For freedom fell

== Marriage and issue ==
John married Margaret de Bonkyll, the daughter and heiress of Sir Alexander de Bonkyll of that Ilk. Margaret remarried, as in 1304 she is named as wife to Sir David, Lord of Brechin. By his wife Sir John had issue:

- Sir Alexander Stewart of Bonkyll (d. 1319), eldest son and heir and the first "Stewart of Bonkyll," who had issue:
  - John Stewart, 1st Earl of Angus;
- Sir Alan Stewart of Dreghorn (d. 19 July 1333), killed in the Battle of Halidon Hill. His descendants were the Stewarts of Darnley, the Earls of Lennox, the Seigneurs d'Abigny, and the House of Stuart who reigned over Great Britain and later the United Kingdom;
- Sir Walter Stewart of Garlies and Dalswinton. His great-granddaughter Marion Stewart married John Stewart of Jedworth, a grandson of Alexander Stewart of Darnley. Their descendants were the Stewarts of Garlies, later Earls of Galloway and Lords Blantyre;
- Sir James Stewart of Pearston (d. 19 July 1333) killed in the Battle of Halidon Hill, together with his elder brother Sir Alan Stewart. His descendants were the Stewart Lords of Lorne, Earls of Atholl, Earls of Buchan, Earls of Traquair and Clan Stewart of Appin.
- Sir John Stewart of Daldon (d. 19 July 1333), killed in the Battle of Halidon Hill and apparently leaving no issue.
- Sir Robert Stewart of Daldowie, ancestor of Steuart baronets and Seton-Steuart baronets.
- Sir Hugh Stewart, who died without issue.
- Isabella Stewart (d. after 15 July 1351), who married Thomas Randolph, 1st Earl of Moray.

== Royal descendants ==
He is the direct paternal ancestor of Henry Stuart, Lord Darnley, who was the second husband of Mary, Queen of Scots, and of their son, James VI of Scotland, who later became James I of England in 1603. As such he was the direct paternal ancestor of all the Stuart monarchs and pretenders of England.

== Genetics ==
In 2013 and 2014, the Genealogical Studies Postgraduate Programme at the University of Strathclyde conducted a genetic study called the Battle of Bannockburn Family History Project. In this study, they tested known descendants of Sir John Stewart and his brother Sir James, which revealed the presence of a unique genetic marker on the Y chromosome of Sir John's patrilineal descendants. In 2015 the International Society of Genetic Genealogy recognized single nucleotide polymorphism (SNP) S781 as evidence of direct patrilineal descent from Sir John Stewart.

== See also ==
- Bonkyl Kirk

== Sources ==
- Calendar of documents relating to Scotland preserved in Her Majesty's Public Record Office. V vols., ed Bain. London 1881.
