= John Bissett of Lovat =

Arms of Bissett of Beaufort

John Bissett the Younger (died 1260), Lord of Lovat, was a Scottish nobleman.

== Life ==
His father John the Elder, Lord of the Aird, fled to Ireland and then to England with his uncle Walter Byset, Lord of Aboyne, after Walter and John had been complicit in the murder of Padraig, Earl of Atholl, and two companions at their lodgings after a tournament at Haddington in 1242.

He died without surviving male issue. His lands were divided between his co-heiresses:

- Cecilia, married to Sir William de Fenton, passing Beaufort into the Fenton family, and had issue
- Elizabeth, married to Andrew de Bosco, passing Kilravock into the Bosco family, and had issue
- Mary, married to David de Graham, passing Lovat into the Graham family, and had issue

== See also ==
- Clan Bissett
