= Rosneath House =

Former stately home of the duke of Argyll in Dunbartonshire, Scotland

Coordinates: 56.0007°N 4.7766°W

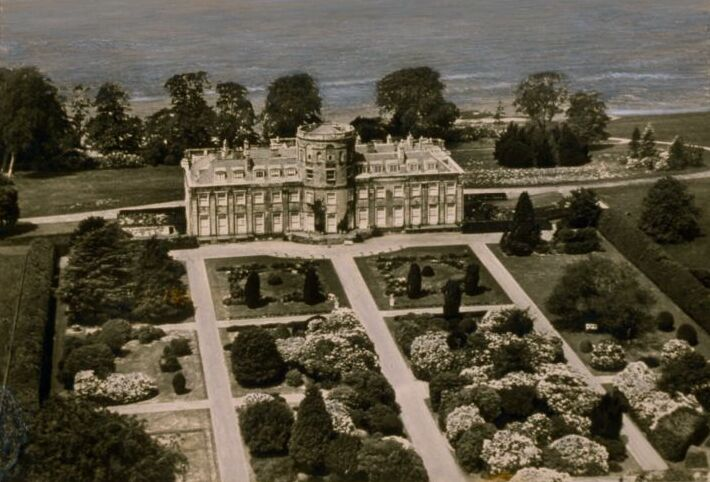
Rosneath House from the air, ca. 1935

Rosneath House was a neoclassical stately home in Dunbartonshire, now in Argyll and Bute. It was constructed as a secondary seat of the Dukes of Argyll. The house was of note as both the home of Princess Louise, Duchess of Argyll and as the military base where Operation Torch during the Second World War was planned. The house was unoccupied after 1949 and was demolished in 1961.

The site is on the Rosneath Peninsula, looking over the Gare Loch to Helensburgh.

== Rosneath Castle ==
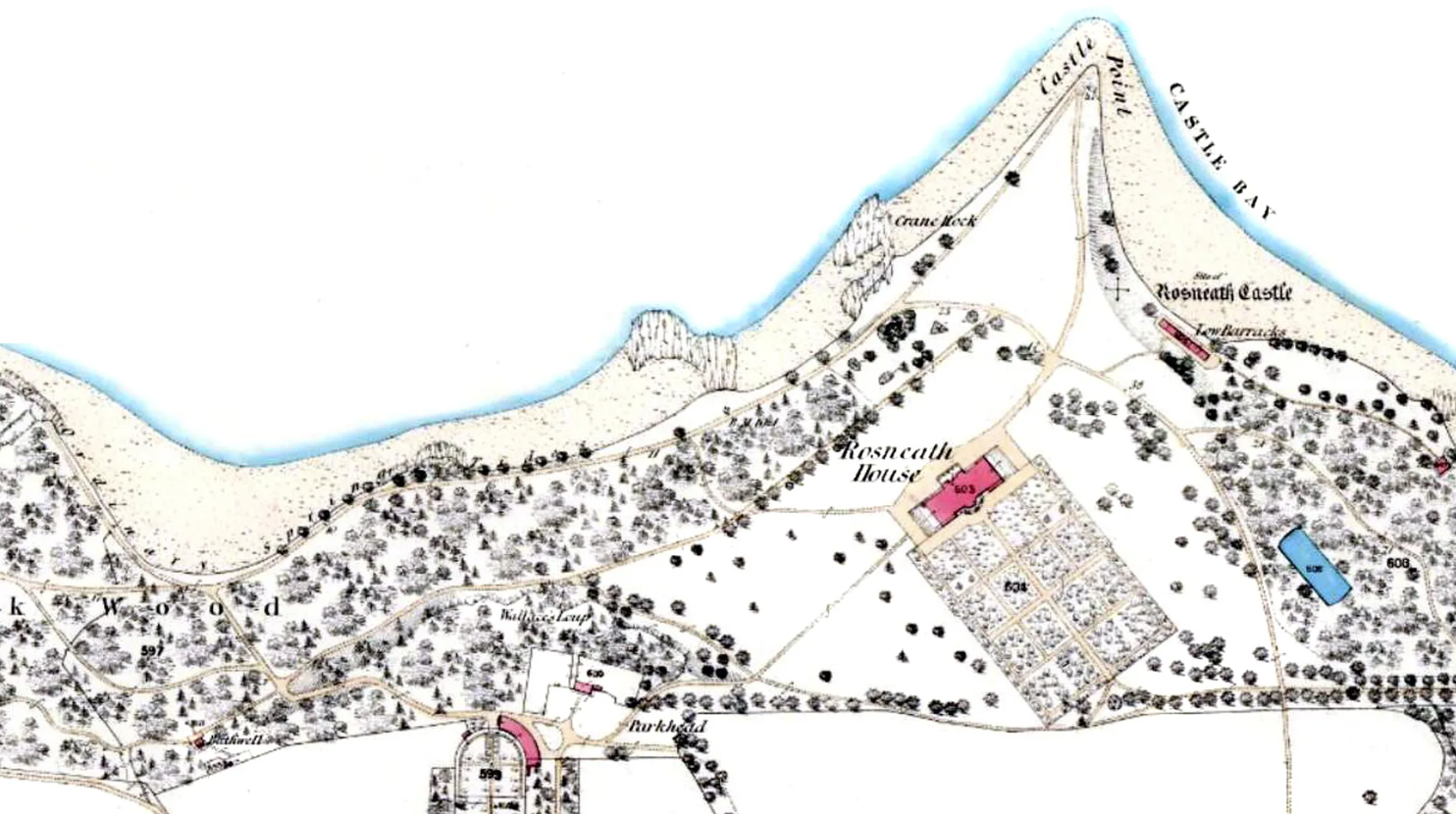
19th century map showing the location of Rosneath castle and house

A castle had stood on the site since at least the 12th century. It was built on a rock outcrop overlooking Castle Bay. The building was attacked by William Wallace while under English control.

In 1490 Rosneath Castle was gifted by King James IV to Colin Campbell, 1st Earl of Argyll. Through him it eventually passed to John Campbell, 2nd Duke of Argyll who died in 1743. His widow decided to vacate the building. When his brother, Archibald Campbell, 3rd Duke of Argyll, visited the property in 1744 he found it an empty shell and decided to rescue the structure. He commissioned William Adam to draw up plans, but due to the Jacobite Rebellion of 1745 plans were put on hold and not until 1757 was the castle ready for reoccupation.

In the 1780s the castle was remodelled in the French fashion on its interior with designs by Robert Mylne.

By 1800 it was in the hands of John Campbell, 5th Duke of Argyll. On 30 May 1802, while the Duke was absent visiting Ardincaple Castle, the castle was destroyed in a fire.

== Rosneath House ==
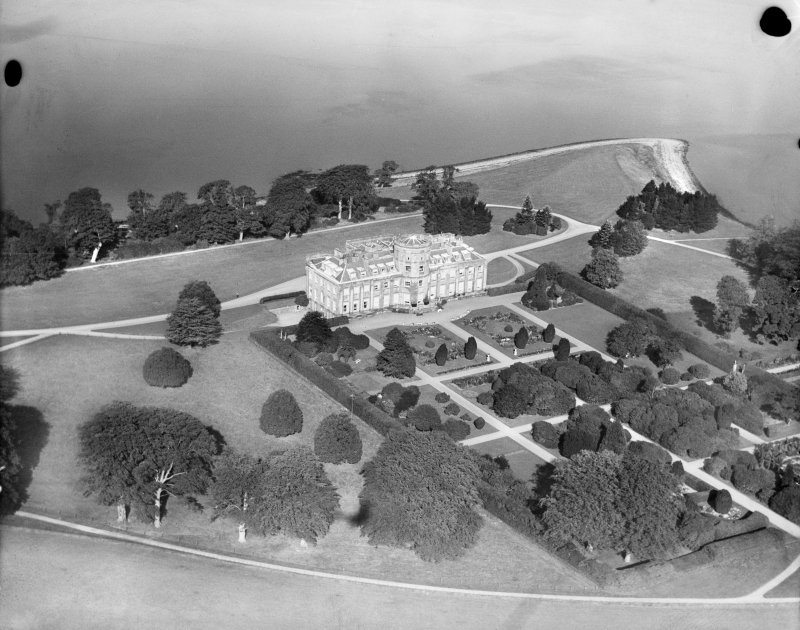
Another view from Rosneath House and garden from the air

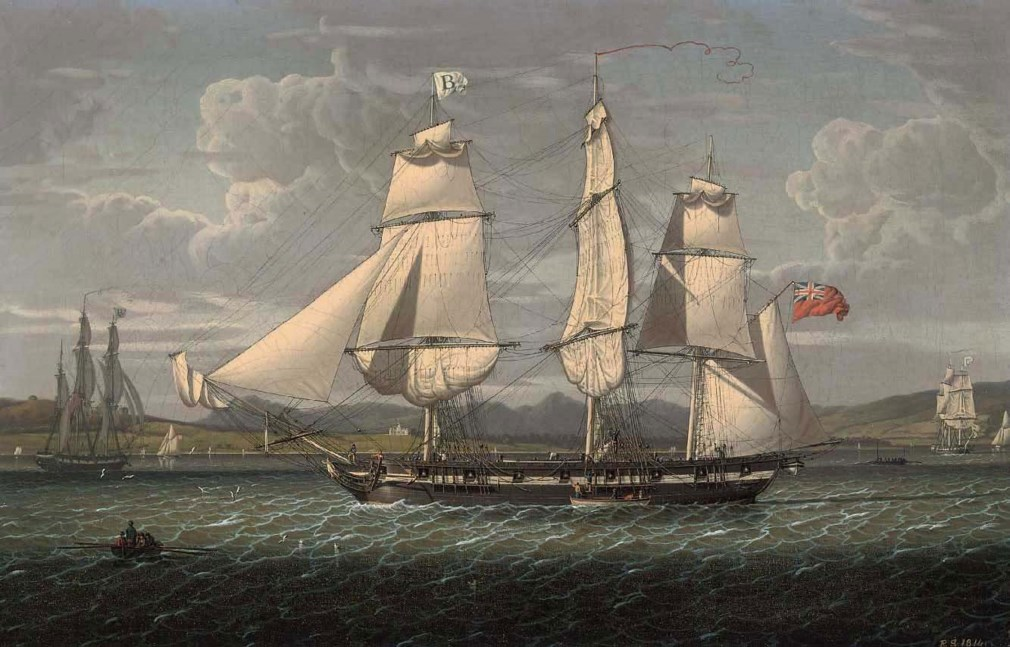
An outward-bound 18-gun merchantman at the Tail of the Bank, passing Rosneath Castle (the white building seen just in front of the ship's foremast) by Robert Salmon in 1814

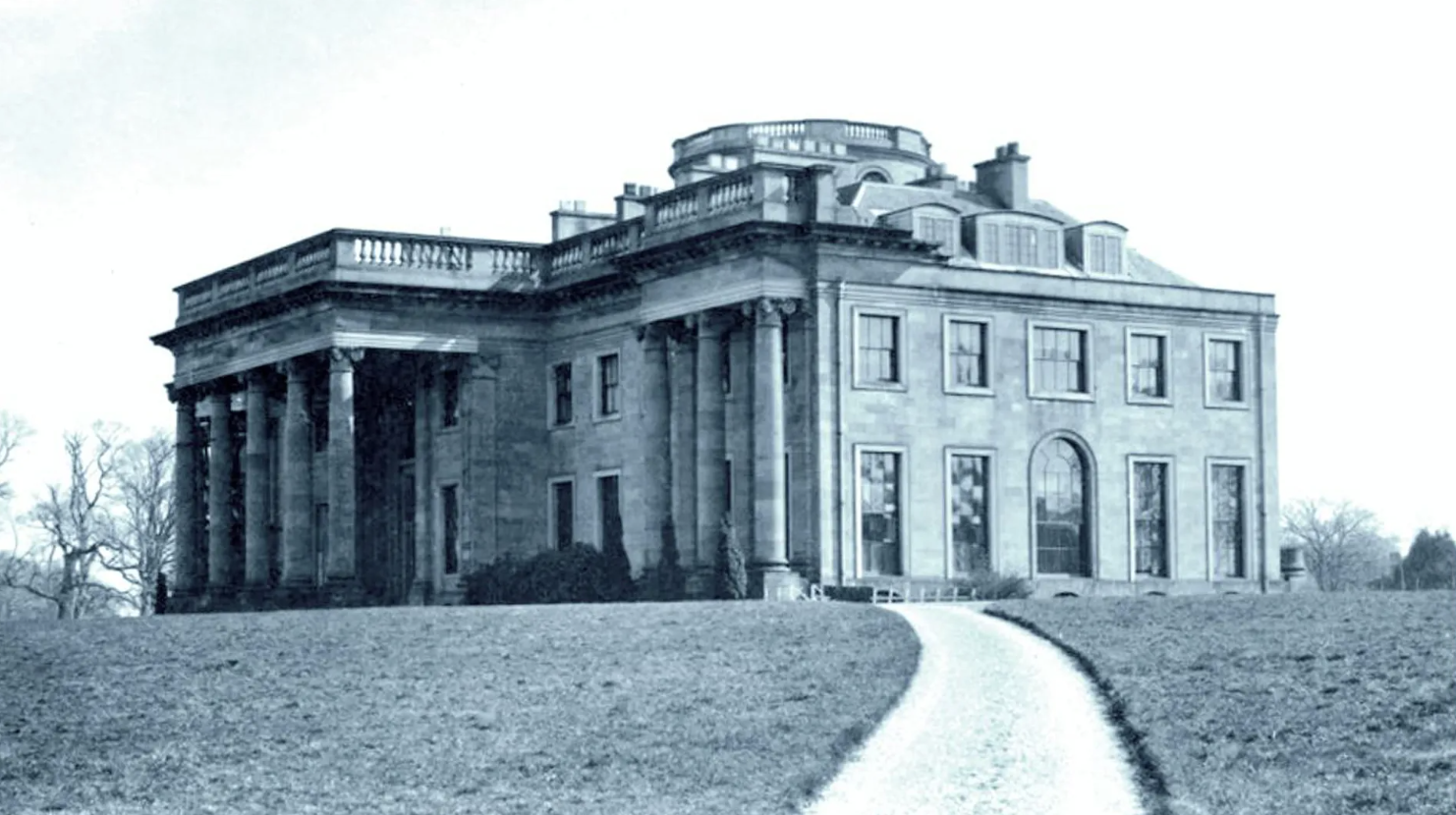
Rosneath House seen from the north west

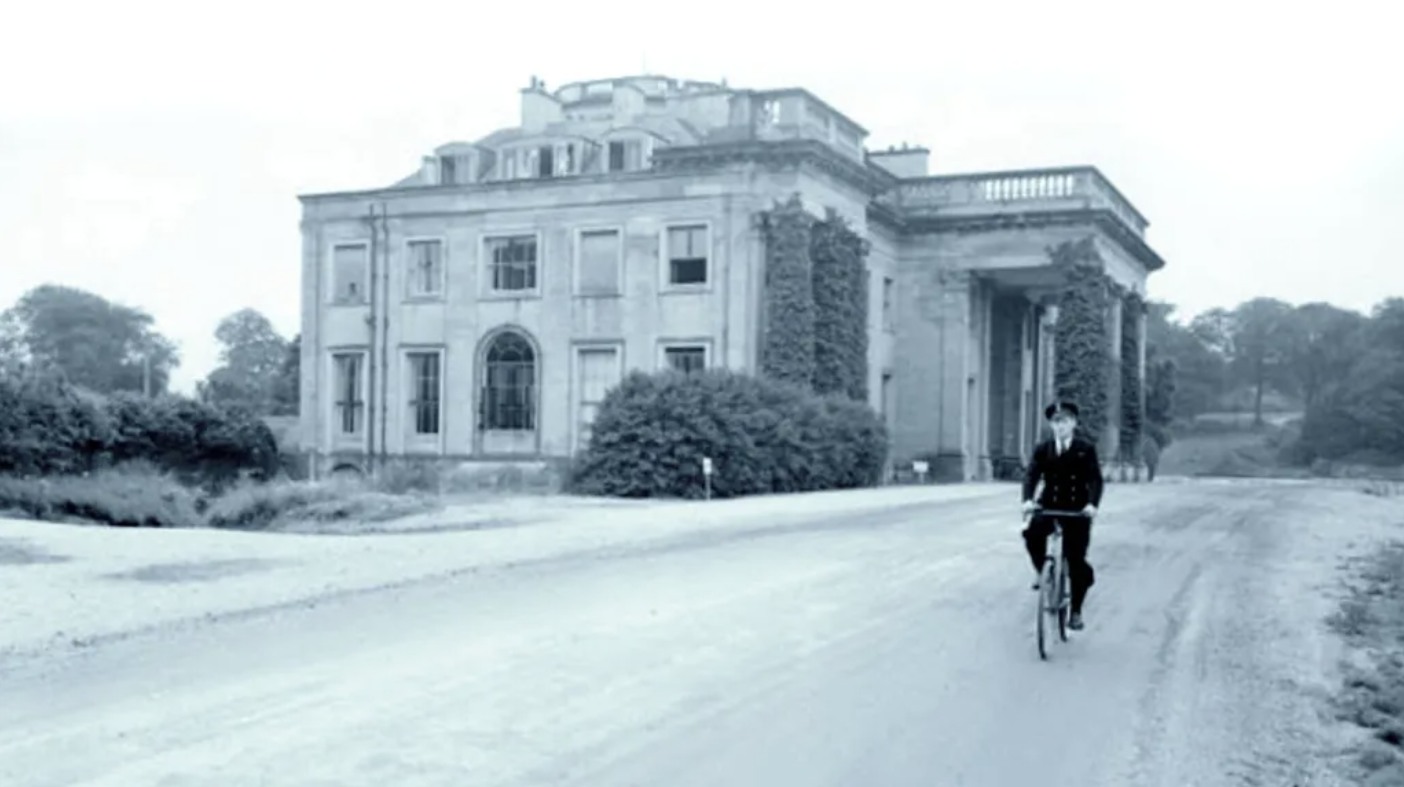
A cyclist in front of Rosneath House

The Duke decided to rebuild the property further inland than the original castle, on a flatter plateau, enabling a far larger and more formal mansion, as was the fashion of the day. The Duke returned to Robert Mylne but died in 1806 before any plans were realised. His heir, the Marquess of Lorne, chose to employ his own architects to continue the project, and used Alexander Nasmyth in conjunction with Joseph Bonomi the Elder, which was further complicated by the death of Bonomi in 1808. Bonomi before his death added an optimistic plaque, describing the project as the "Lornian Palace".

For this reason and reasons of expense, the envisaged house was never fully realised. Work was halted in 1810 and the interiors of those sections completed was not in place until 1820. It was of unusual plan form, with a wide central corridor along his whole width. The broad plan was two storeys in height with a projecting colonnade on its north side. The main feature on the south side was a central circular tower of four storeys. It had a subterranean street leading to a service courtyard.

In 1871 the then Marquess of Lorne married Queen Victoria's fourth daughter, Louise, thereafter known as Princess Louise, Duchess of Argyll and the house was then treated more as a palace. On her husband's death in 1914 Rosneath became her Dower House. During the First World War she allowed the surplus rooms to be used by convalescing officers.

The princess lived until 1939 but was childless. Her death precipitated the sale of the contents by auction in 1940. The house's strategic location brought a temporary reprieve and the building was occupied by military forces as a command centre, and was the location of the important meeting between Churchill, Eisenhower and Montgomery to negotiate Operation Torch: the invasion of North Africa.

After the war its scenic location brought about its use as a caravan park but the house itself was unoccupied after 1949. Following general deterioration and a fire along with worries of children playing in the derelict structure led to its demolition in 1961. The house was dramatically blown up using 200 pounds (91 kg) of gelignite.

== Gallery: The design by Joseph Bonomi ==
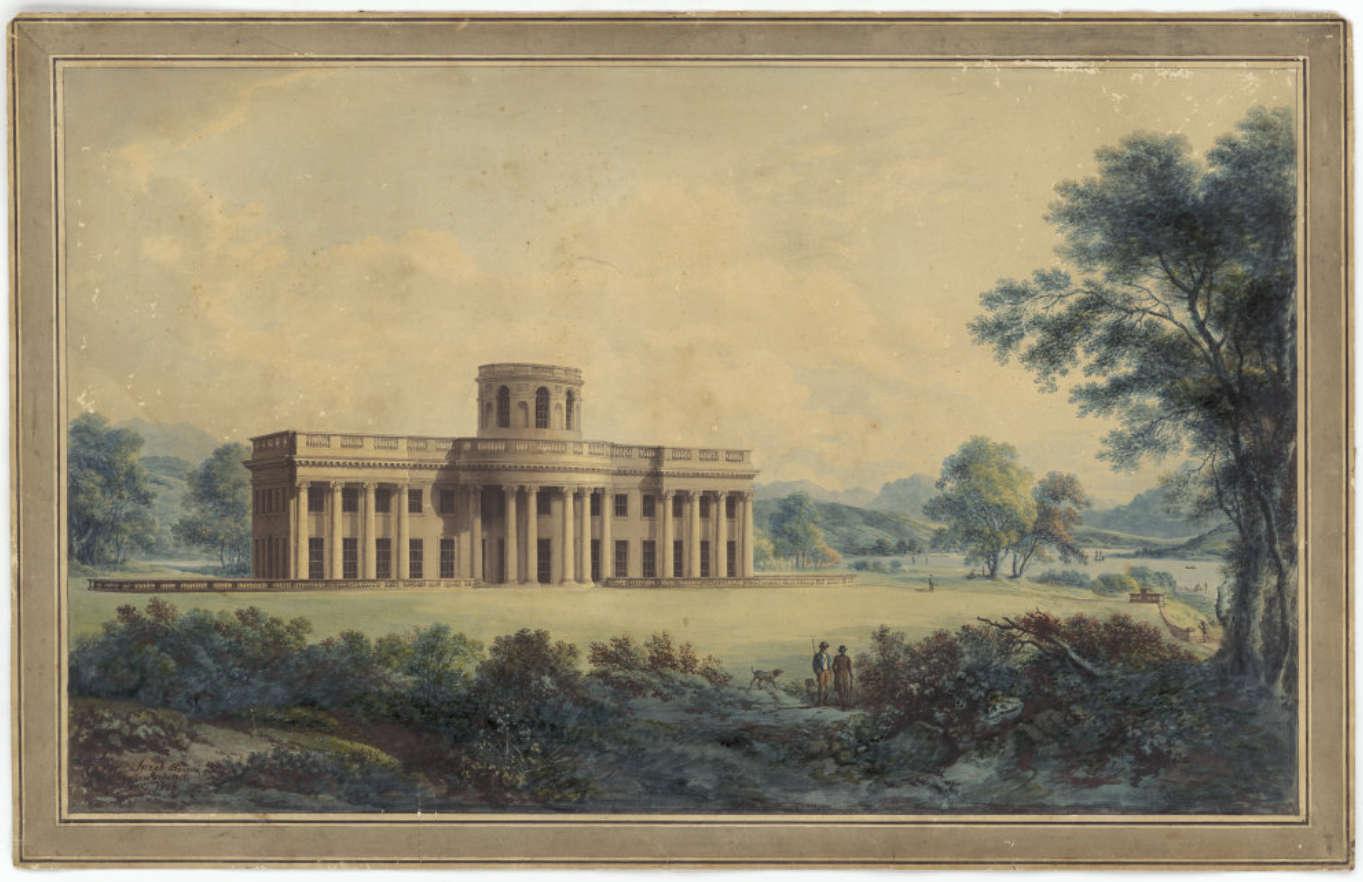
Perspective from the north-east

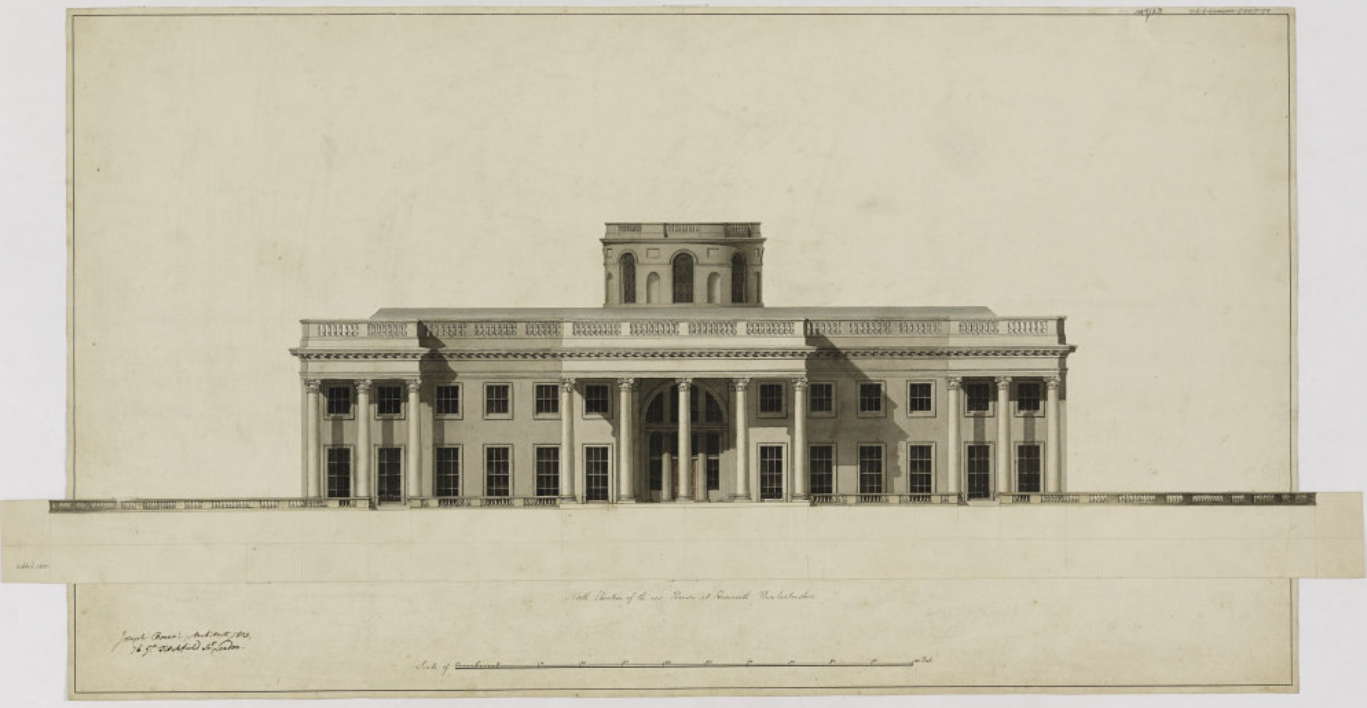
North elevation

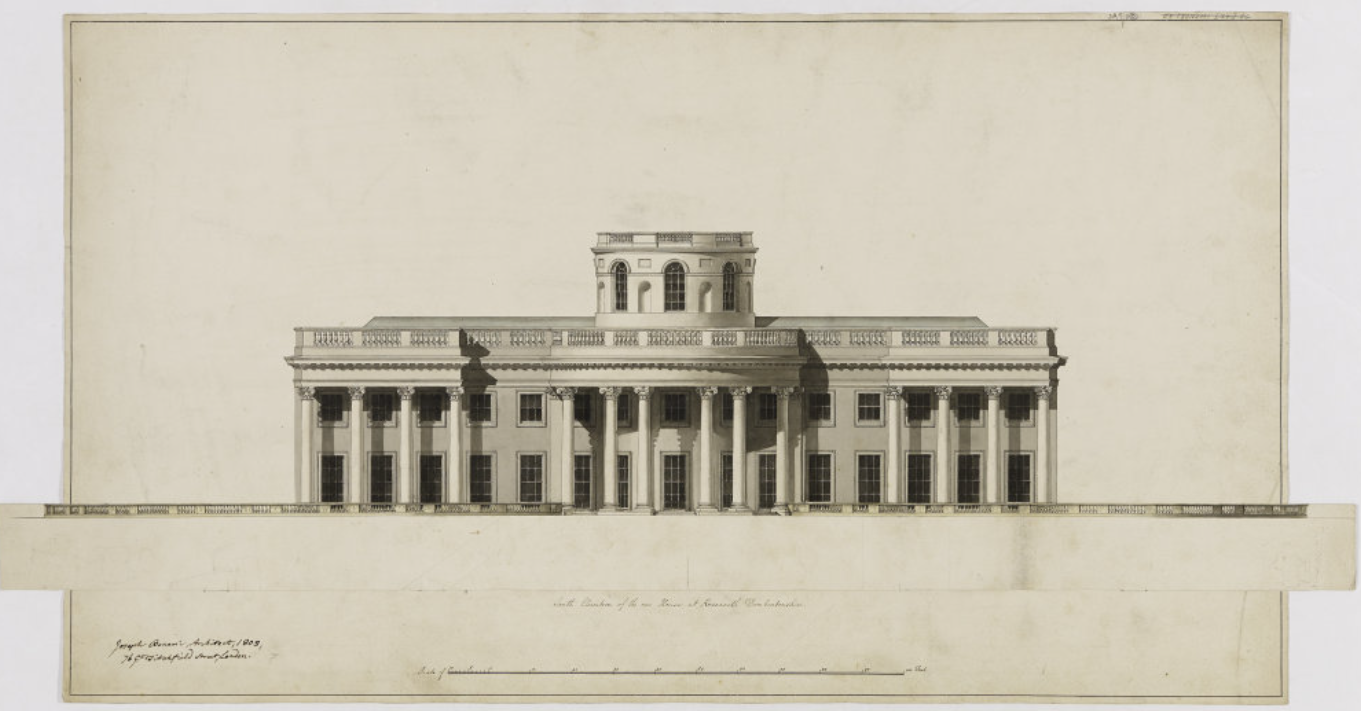
South elevation

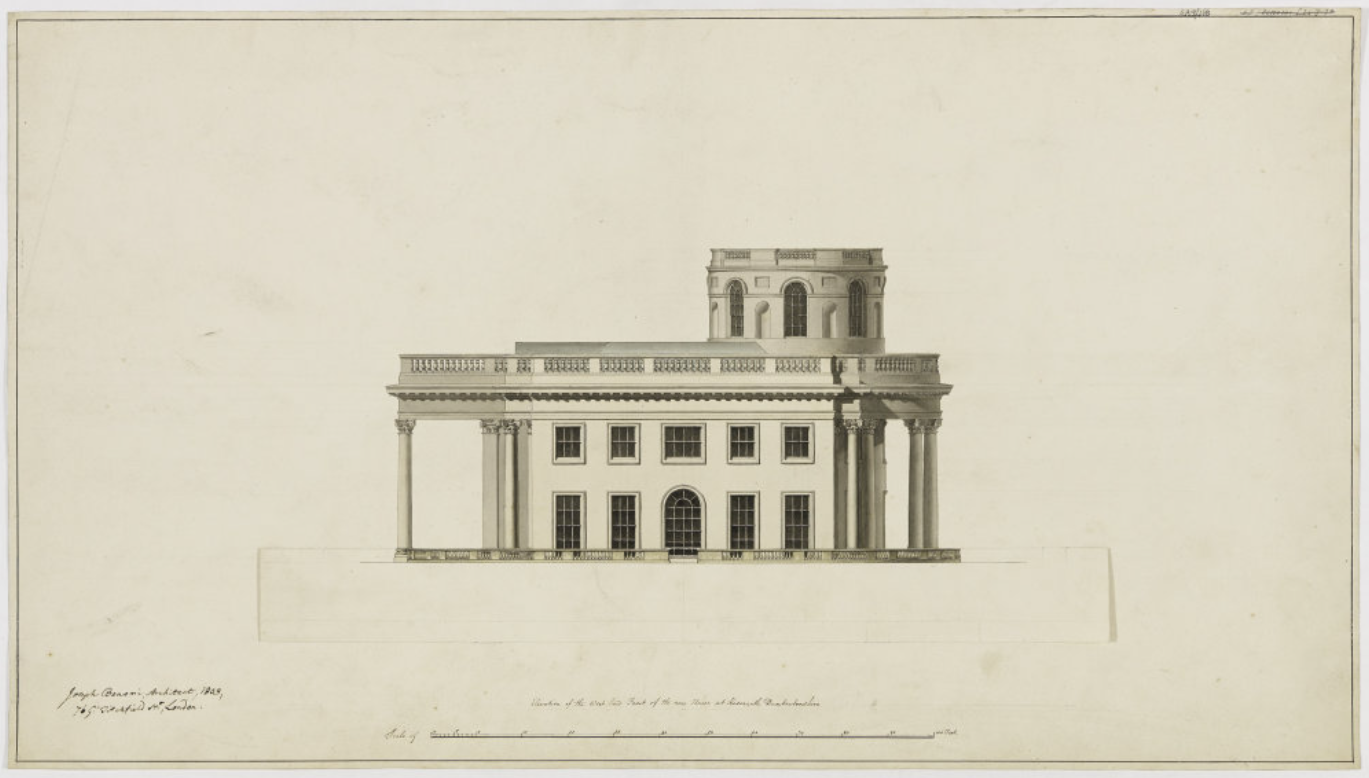
West elevation

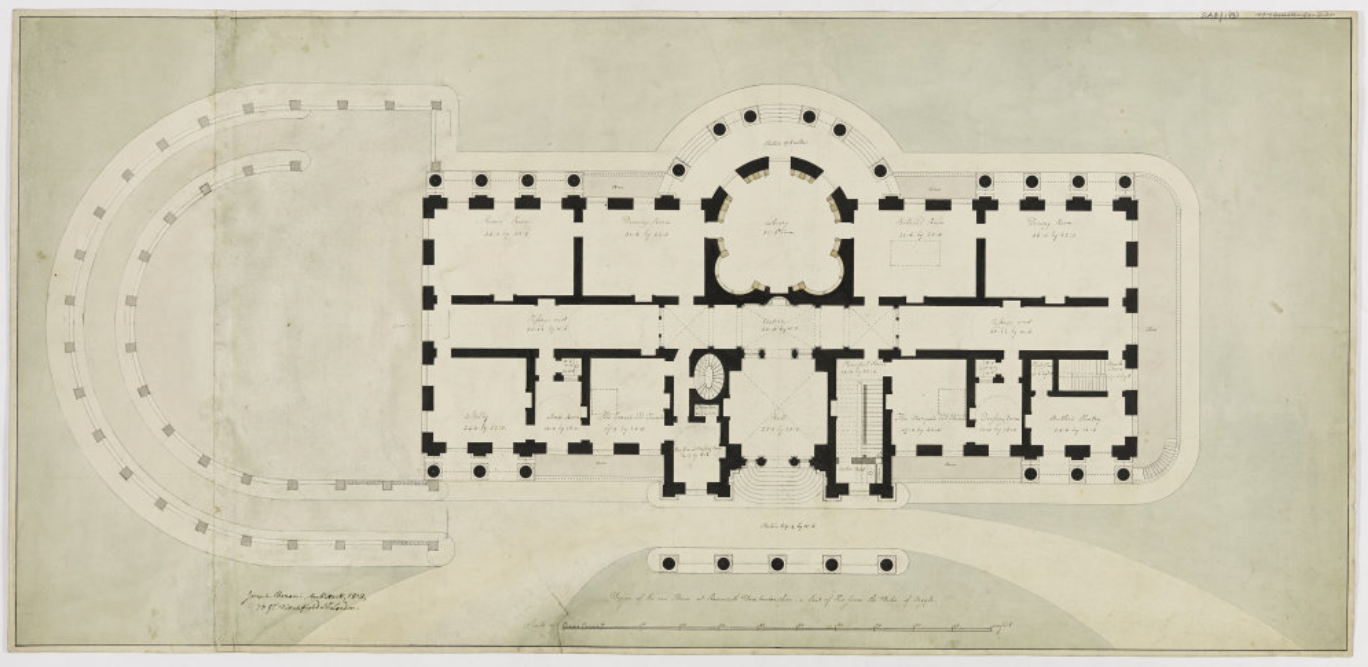
Floor plan

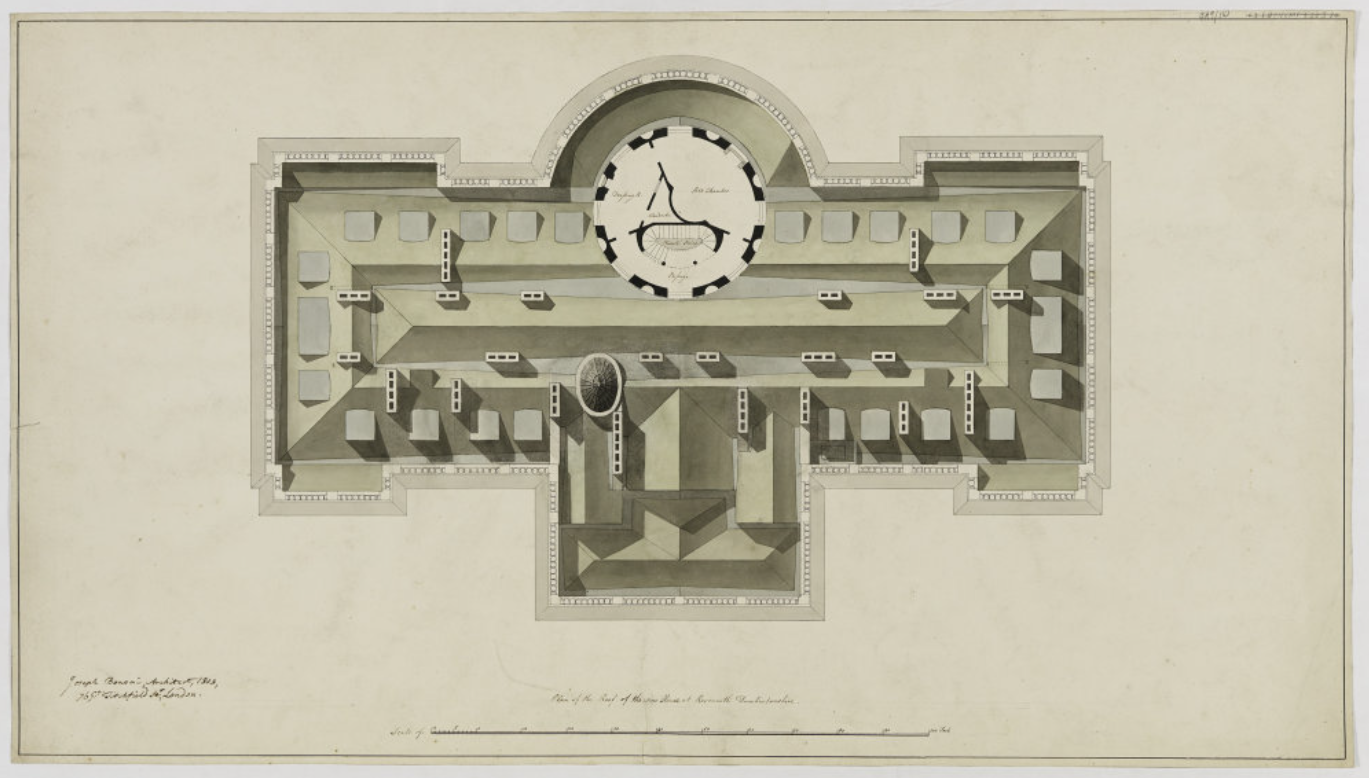
Roof plan

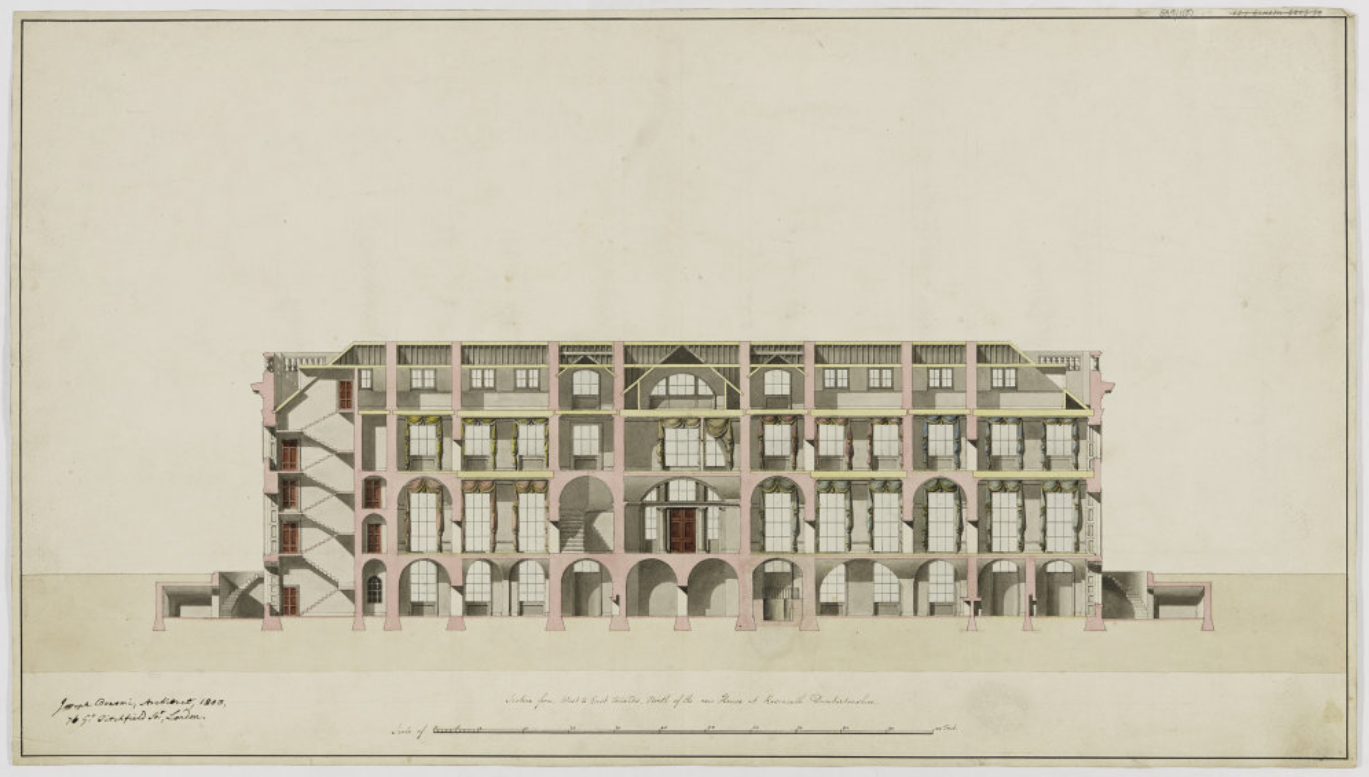
Section from West to East

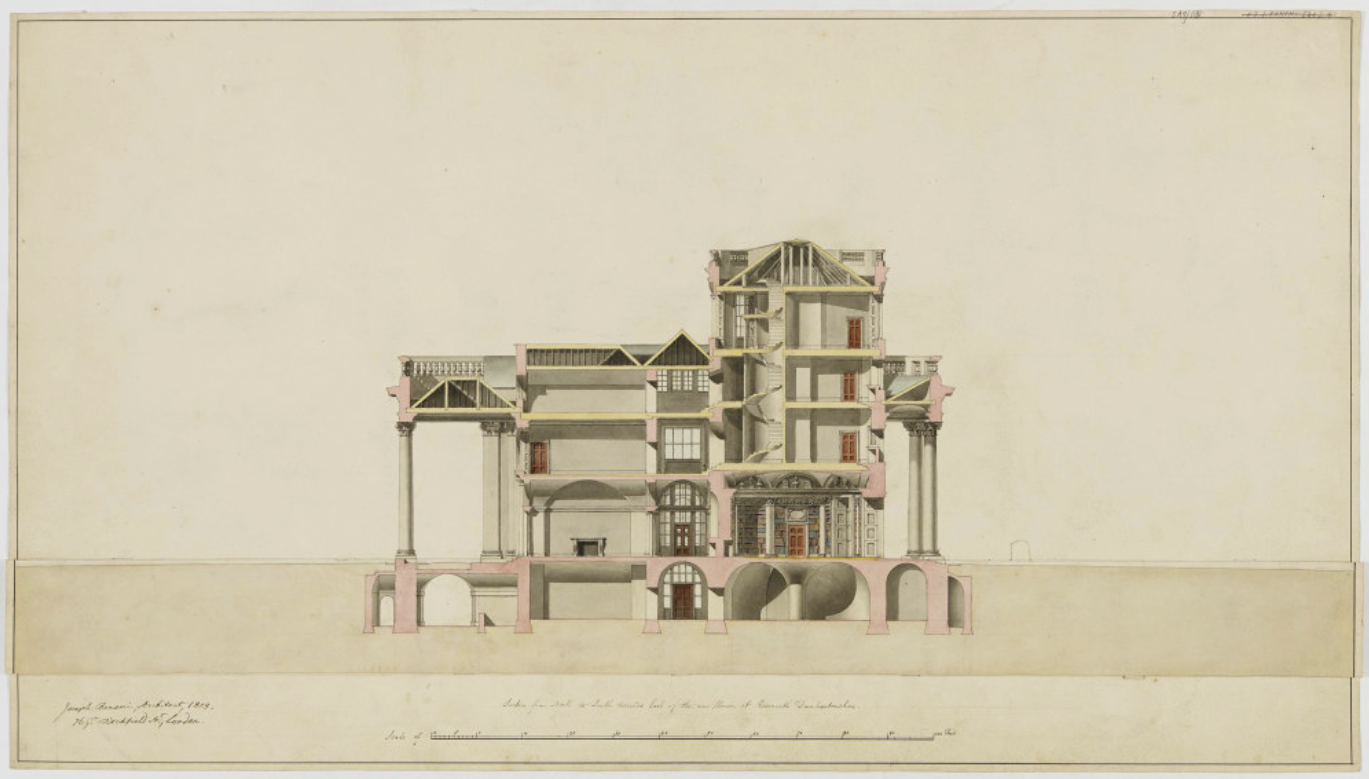
Section North to South

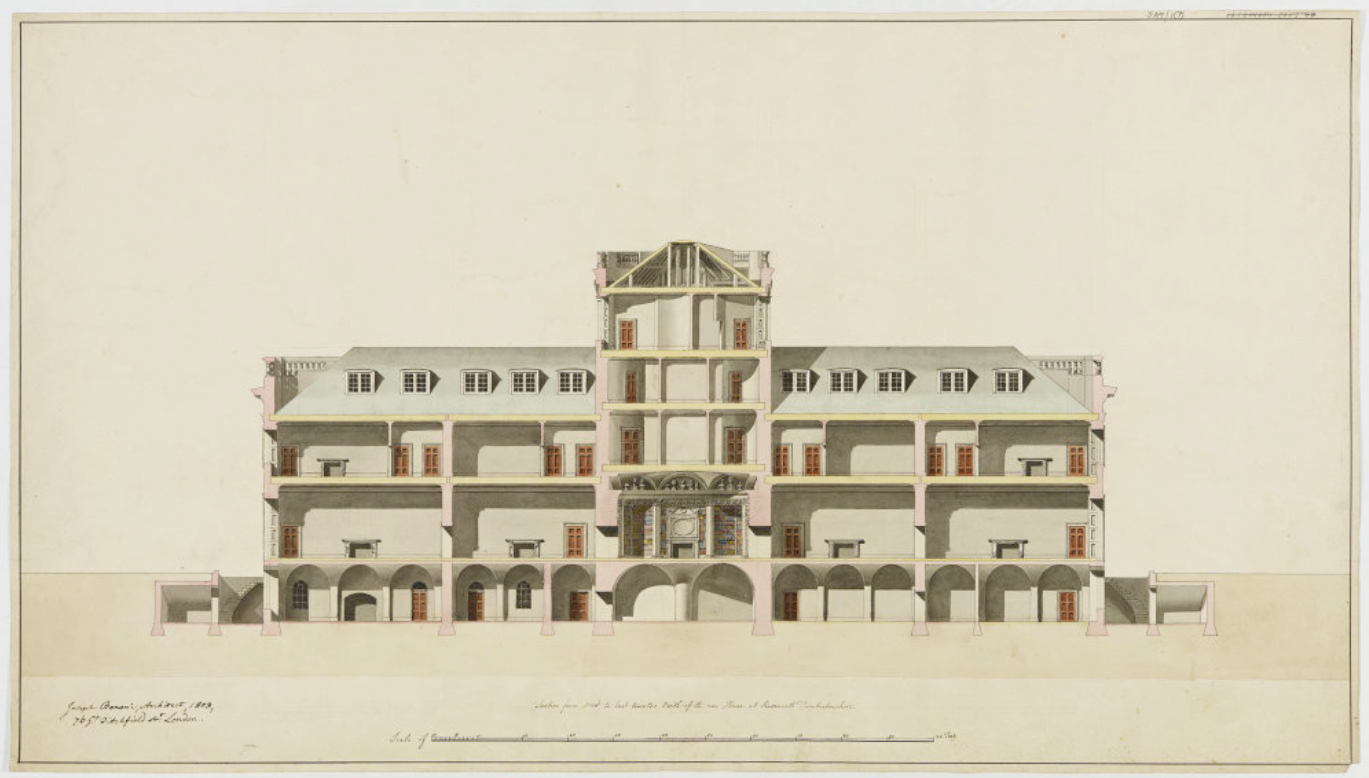
Section West to East

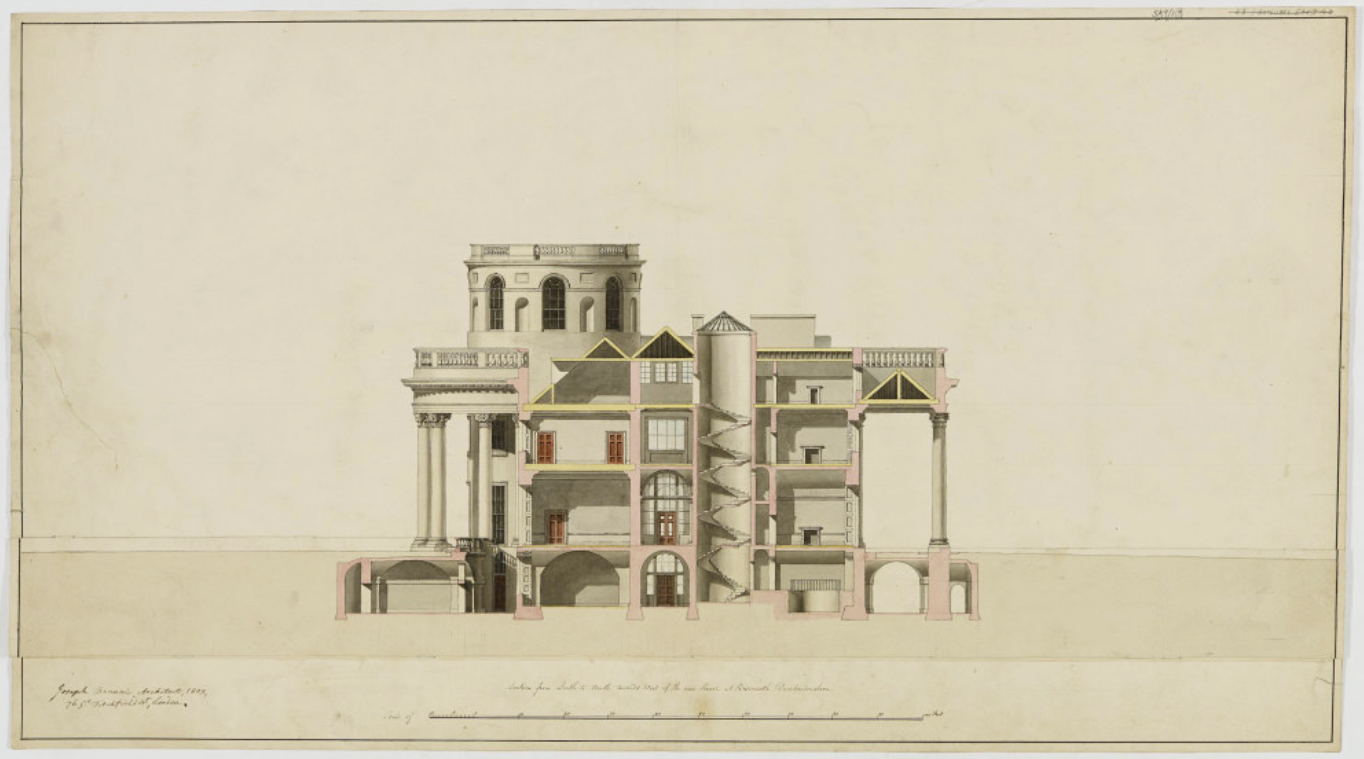
South to North
