= David de Graham of Lovat =

13th-century Scottish noble and soldier

David de Graham, Lord of Lovat (died 1297) was a 13th-century Scottish noble and soldier.

David was a younger son of David Graham of Dundaff. He swore fealty to King Edward I of England in 1291 and was one of John Balliol's auditors in 1292 during the competition for the Scottish crown. He fought at the Battle of Dunbar in 1296 and was captured together with a number of his relatives. His older brother Patrick was killed during the battle. Held in English captivity, he was released on condition of serving in King Edward I of England's expedition in Flanders in 1297. He died in Flanders in 1297.

His escutcheon is described as "Semèe of crosses crosslet fitchèe, three escallops".

== Marriage and issue ==
David married Mary, daughter and co-heiress of John Bisset, Lord of Lovat; they had the following issue:

- Patrick de Graham of Lovat
