= David Graham (English cricketer) =

English cricketer (born 1971)

Personal information
- Full name: David Alexander Graham
- Born: 21 May 1971 (age 55); Moreton-in-Marsh, Gloucestershire, England
- Batting: Right-handed
- Bowling: Right-arm medium

Domestic team information
- Years: Team
- 1996–1999: Herefordshire

Career statistics
| Competition | LA |
|---|---|
| Matches | 4 |
| Runs scored | 28 |
| Batting average | 7.00 |
| 100s/50s | –/– |
| Top score | 14 |
| Balls bowled | – |
| Wickets | – |
| Bowling average | – |
| 5 wickets in innings | – |
| 10 wickets in match | – |
| Best bowling | – |
| Catches/stumpings | 1/– |
- Source: Cricinfo, 26 November 2010

David Alexander Graham (born 21 May 1971) is an English cricketer. Graham is a right-handed batsman who bowls right-arm medium pace. He was born at Moreton-in-Marsh, Gloucestershire.

Graham made his debut for Herefordshire in the 1996 Minor Counties Championship against Berkshire. From 1996 to 1999, he represented the county in 13 Championship matches, the last of which came against Cheshire. His MCCA Knockout Trophy debut for the county came against Shropshire in 1997. From 1997 to 1999, he represented the county in 7 Trophy matches, the last of which came against the Worcestershire Cricket Board.

He also represented Herefordshire in List A cricket. His debut List A match came against Somerset in the 1997 NatWest Trophy. From 1997 to 1999, he represented the county in 4 List A matches, the last of which came against Yorkshire in the 1999 NatWest Trophy. In his 4 matches, he scored 28 runs at a batting average of 7.00, with a high score of 14. In the field the took a single catch.
