= Saint Modan =

6th-century Irish chieftain and saint

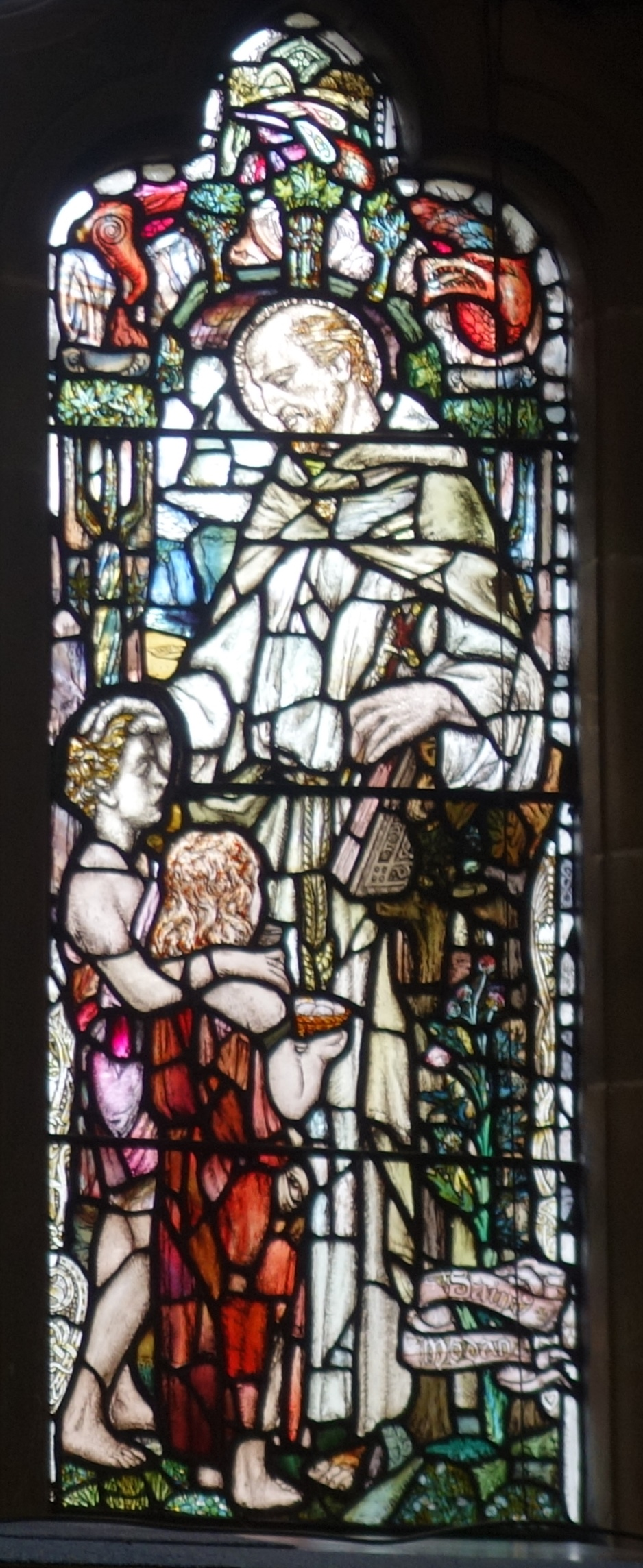
Saint Modan (Robert Story Memorial Window by Douglas Strachan, in the Bute Hall of Glasgow University)

St Modan was the son of an Irish chieftain. He became a monk and built a chapel at Dryburgh, Scotland, in 522 which he used as a base for several years. This later became the site of a monastery: Dryburgh Abbey.

He actively proselytised on behalf of the Celtic church in the Falkirk and Stirling areas, and along the Forth, continuing until he was elected abbot, a post which he accepted reluctantly. After a number of years he resigned and became a hermit, settling in the Dumbarton area, where he would die. His relics were enshrined at Saint Modan's church, Rosneath.

His feast day is February 4, and he is venerated in the Roman Catholic Church as well as the Eastern Orthodox Church.
