= Baikie Castle =

- Angus, Scotland

Site information
- Condition: No remains above ground

Location
- Location in Angus, Scotland
- Coordinates: 56.6307°N 3.1125°W

Site history
- Built: c. 13th century
- Materials

Baikie Castle, was a castle on the shores of the former Loch of Baikie, Angus, Scotland. The castle was owned by the Fenton family from the 13th century until the 15th century, when it was passed to the Lyon of Glamis family. The castle was surrounded by a moat, with a drawbridge and stone causeway providing access to the castle. No remains were evident by the 19th century.
