= Battle of Falkirk =

1298 battle of the First War of Scottish Independence

- Part of the First War of Scottish Independence
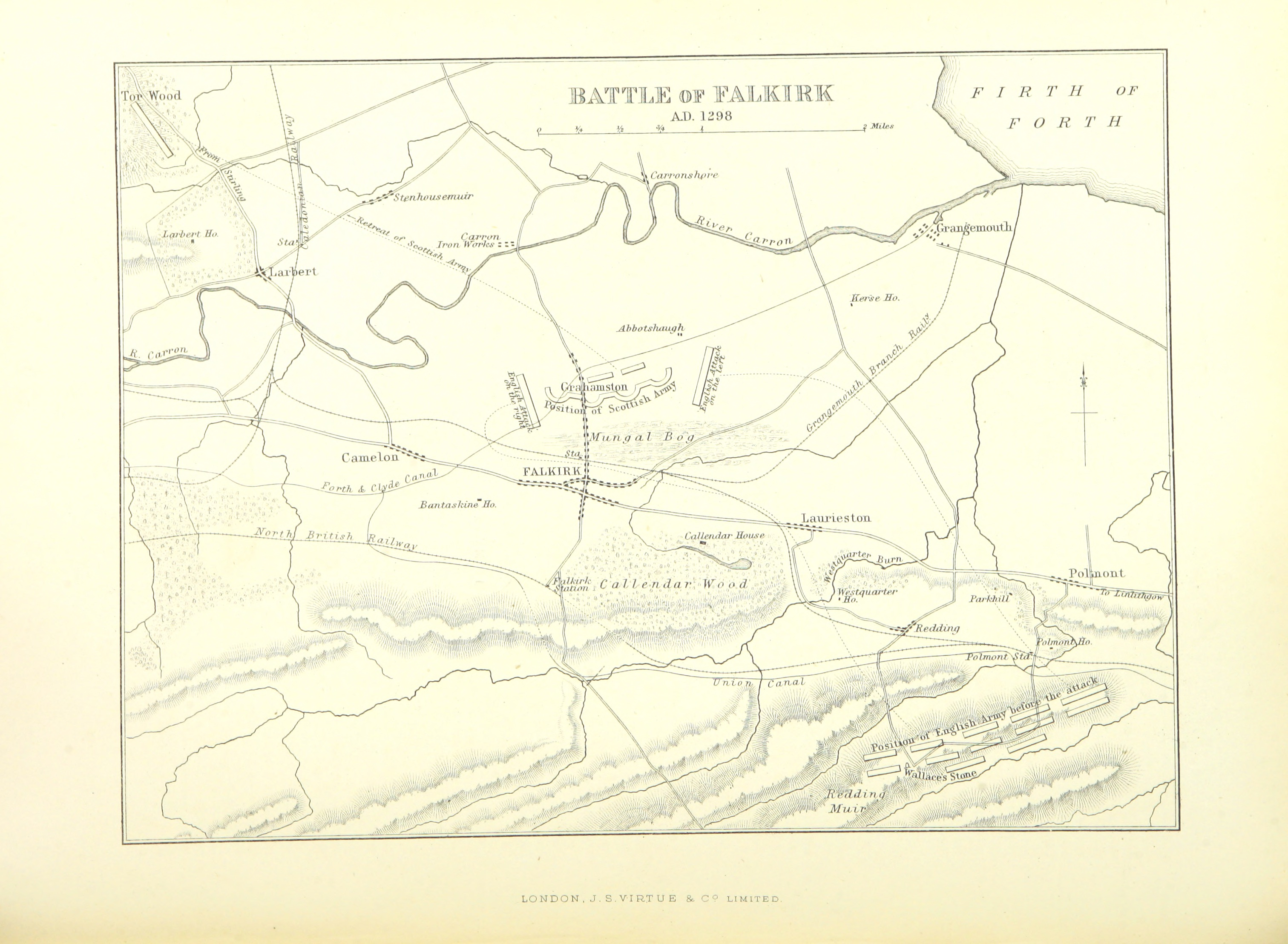
- Map of the battlefield
Date	22 July 1298
Location	Falkirk, Scotland 55°59′15″N 3°45′36″W
Result	English victory

Belligerents
Kingdom of Scotland	Kingdom of England

Commanders and leaders
Sir William Wallace; Sir John Stewart †; Macduff of Fife †; Sir John de Graham †	King Edward I Antony Bek

Strength
~6,000 men: 1,000 cavalry; 5,000 infantry	~15,000 men: 2,500 cavalry; 12,500 infantry

Casualties and losses
~2,000 killed	~2,000 killed

The Battle of Falkirk (Scottish Gaelic: Blàr na h-Eaglaise Brice; Scots: Battle o Fawkirk), on 22 July 1298, was one of the major battles in the First War of Scottish Independence. Led by King Edward I of England, the English army defeated the Scots, led by William Wallace. Shortly after the battle Wallace resigned as Guardian of Scotland.

== Background ==
After the Battle of Stirling Bridge, from November 1297 until January 1298 Wallace led a Scottish army south. From Newcastle upon Tyne to Carlisle, the Scots raided the countryside, bringing back the spoils.

King Edward learned of the defeat of his northern army at the Battle of Stirling Bridge. After concluding a truce with the French king, Philip the Fair, in October 1297, he returned to England on 14 March 1298 to continue the ongoing organising of an army for his second invasion of Scotland which had been in preparation since late 1297. As a preliminary step, he moved the centre of government to York, where it was to remain for the next six years. A council-of-war was held in the city in April to finalise the details of the invasion. The Scottish magnates were all summoned to attend; when none appeared, they were all declared to be traitors. Edward then ordered his army to assemble at Roxburgh on 25 June. The force counted 2,000 armoured cavalry and about 12,000 infantry receiving wages, though, after the manner of medieval armies there would have been many more serving without pay either as a statement of personal independence, forgiveness of debts to the crown, criminal pardons or just for adventure. Stuart Reid estimates Edward's force at 214 knights with 900 troopers, 1,000 cavalry supplied by the Earls, 500 mercenary crossbowmen, 2,000 archers with billmen from the Lancashire and Cheshire feudal levies, though the infantry may only have totalled 8,000.

Edward left Roxburgh on 3 July and reached Kirkliston in two weeks, where he awaited supplies expected to arrive along the coastal ports, delayed due to weather. In the interim, he dealt with a Welsh mutiny. Finally, on 20 July, he advanced, reaching Linlithgow on 21 July. Edward was on the point of falling back on Edinburgh, when he received intelligence the Scots were at Torwood, near Falkirk, ready to harass his retreat. Edward reportedly said that he "would not trouble them to seek me", and placed his army south of Falkirk on the morning of 22 July. Edward wanted to make camp and feed his men while waiting for his infantry to catch up with his cavalry. His cavalry commanders though, favoured an immediate attack.

Reid calculates the Scots could have manned four schiltrons with about 1,000 men each, in addition to the cavalry and archers. These men would have come from the sheriffdoms of Fife, Kinross, Midlothian, Haddington, Stirling, Linlithgow, Lanark, Merse and Teviotdale. With that, Wallace supposedly said, "I have browghte yowe to the ryng. Hoppe yef ye canne!" Absent were forces under the Comyns and Robert Bruce. Also absent was Andrew Moray, co-victor with Wallace at the Battle of Stirling Bridge, having been mortally wounded in that battle. It was Moray who used the schiltrons offensively.

== Battle ==
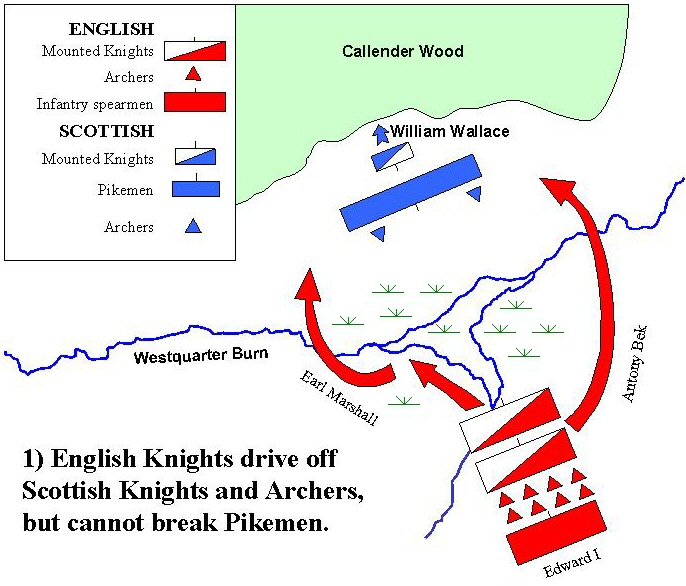
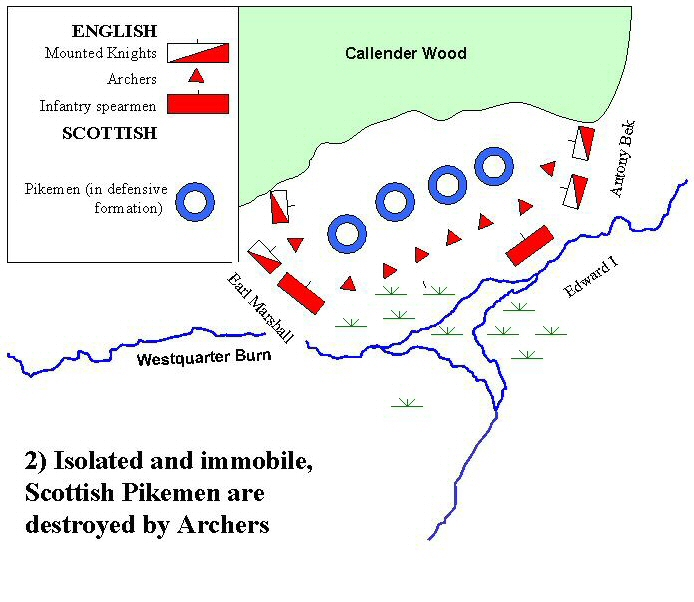

The Scots army, again made up chiefly of spearmen as at Stirling Bridge, was arranged in four great "hedgehogs" known as schiltrons. The long spears (pikes) pointing outwards at various heights gave these formations a formidable and impenetrable appearance. The gaps between the schiltrons were filled with archers, with 500 mounted knights at the rear.

On Tuesday 22 July, the English cavalry, divided into four battles, advanced in echelon. The vanguard, led by the Earl of Lincoln, moved to the left to avoid a marshy area, followed by the battle of John de Warenne, 6th Earl of Surrey. The battle of Anthony Bek, Bishop of Durham, followed by the king's battle, moved around the marshy area to the right, toward the Scottish left flank. Lincoln's and Bek's battles charged the Scots and Lincoln quickly routed the Scottish cavalry.

The Scots bowmen commanded by Sir John Stewart, the younger brother of the High Steward of Scotland, stood their ground but were overrun by the English cavalry. However, the schiltrons held firm, with the knights making little impression on the dense forest of long spears, and 111 horses were killed in the vain attempts. Edward's cavalry fell back as his infantry and archers arrived.

Edward's archers, crossbowmen and slingers began raining projectiles on the inexperienced and poorly armoured Scottish spearmen. The schiltrons were an easy target: they had no defence and nowhere to hide. Pinned in place by the English cavalry and infantry, unable to retreat or attack, the battle was lost for the Scots almost as soon as the first arrows began to fall. The English waited, this time observing the king's command, until the Scottish ranks were thinned out and disordered enough to allow them to break up the schiltrons. The English cavalry and infantry then attacked the wavering Scottish spearmen, and the schiltrons broke and scattered.

== Aftermath ==
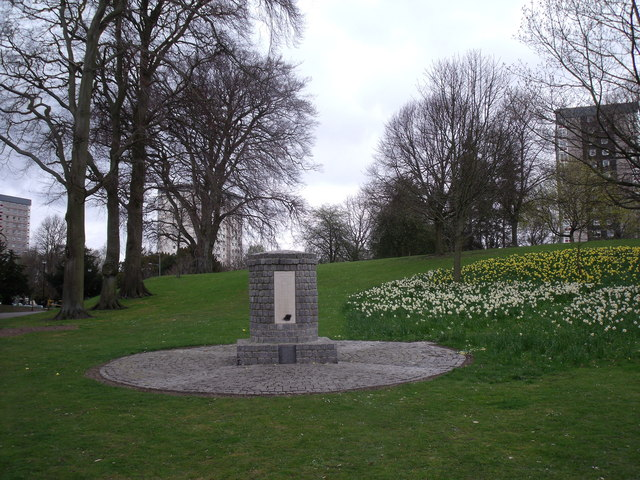
The First Battle of Falkirk Monument (2000)

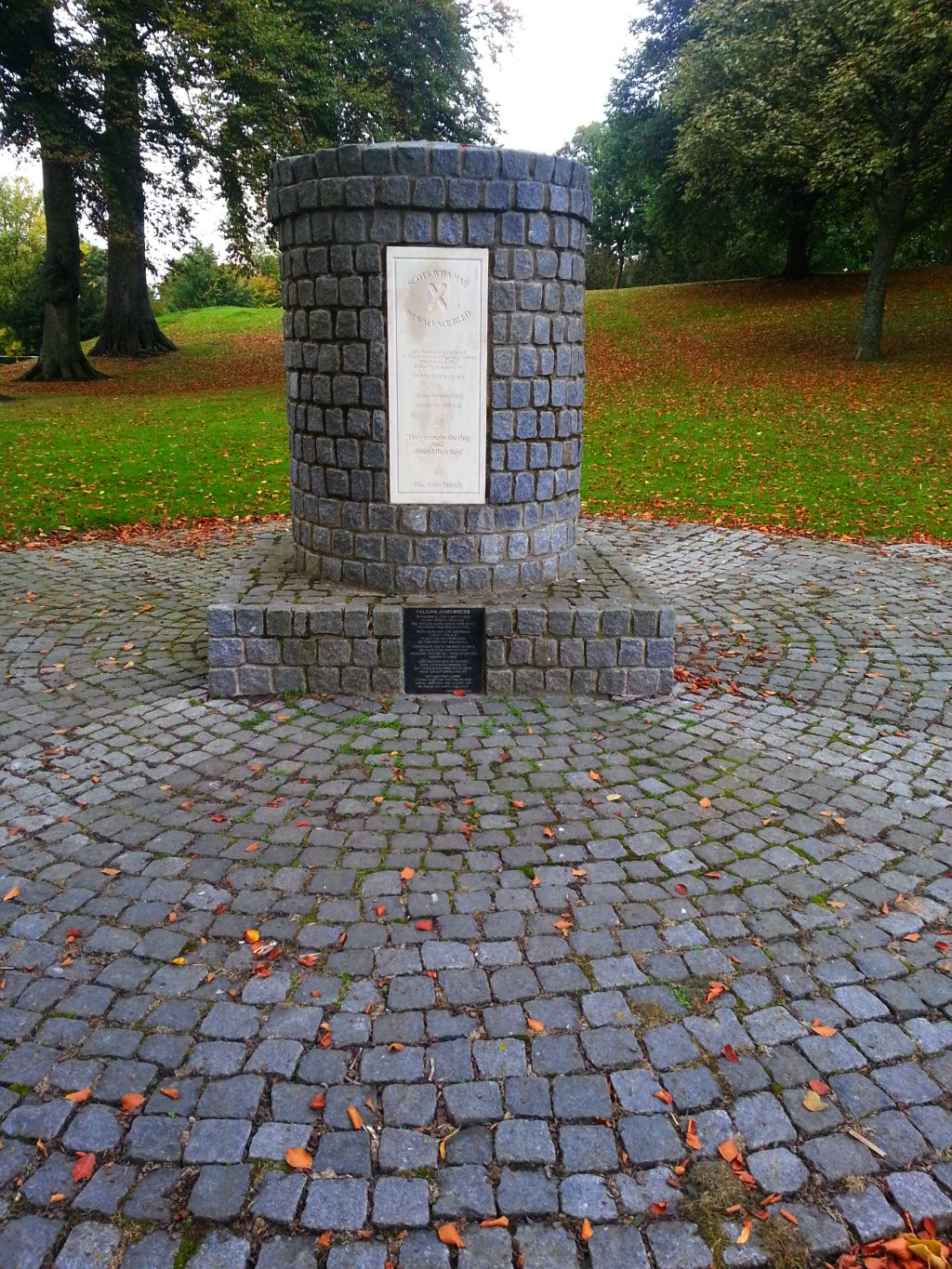
Scots Wha Hae

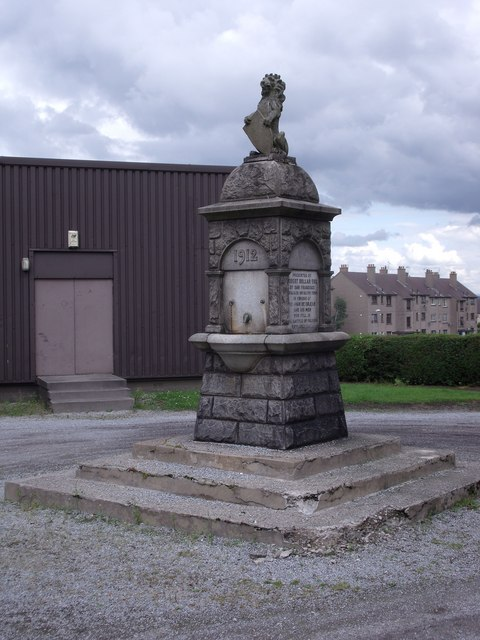
John de Graeme's Memorial

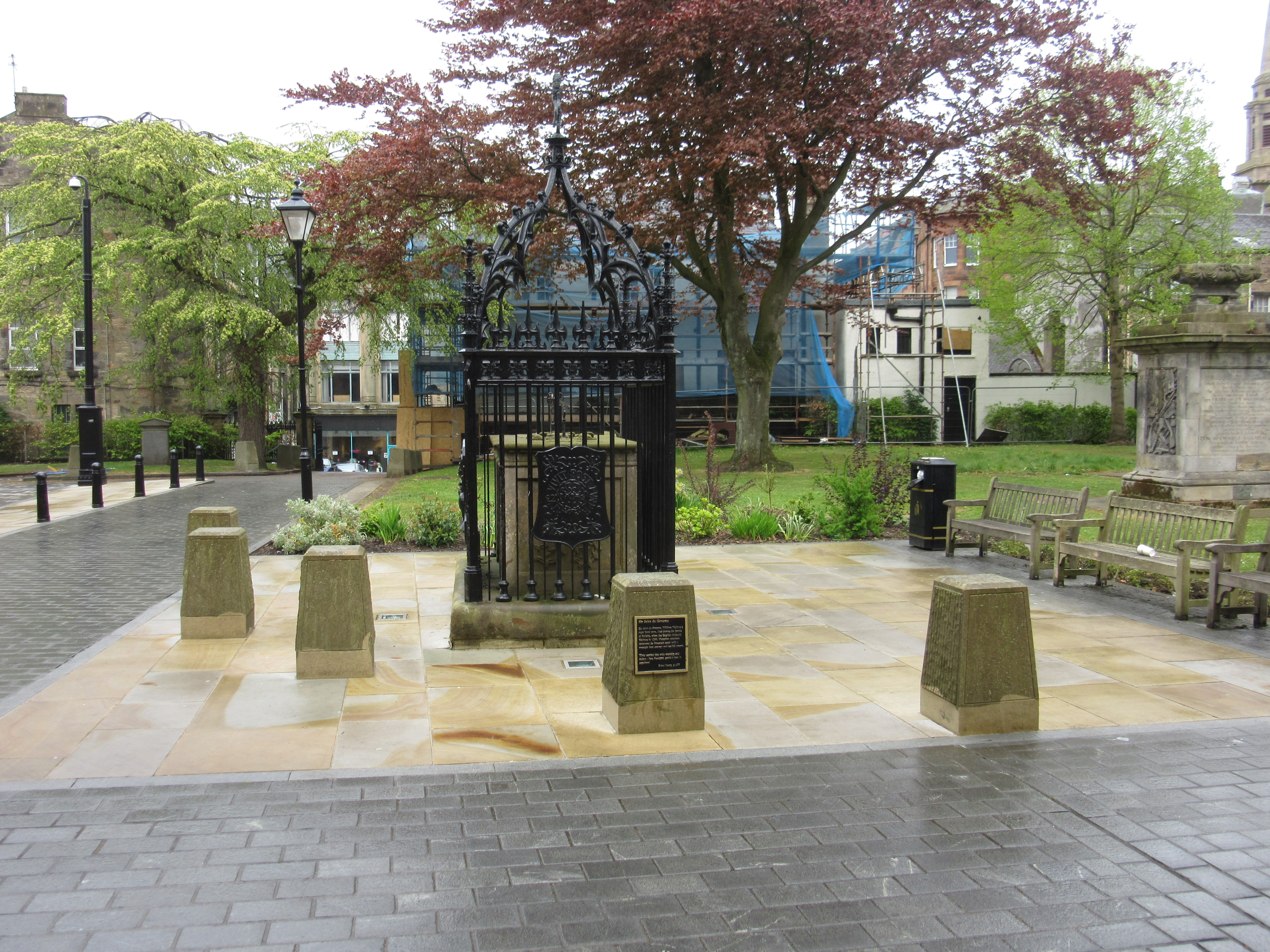
Sir John De Graeme tomb, Falkirk Old Parish Church

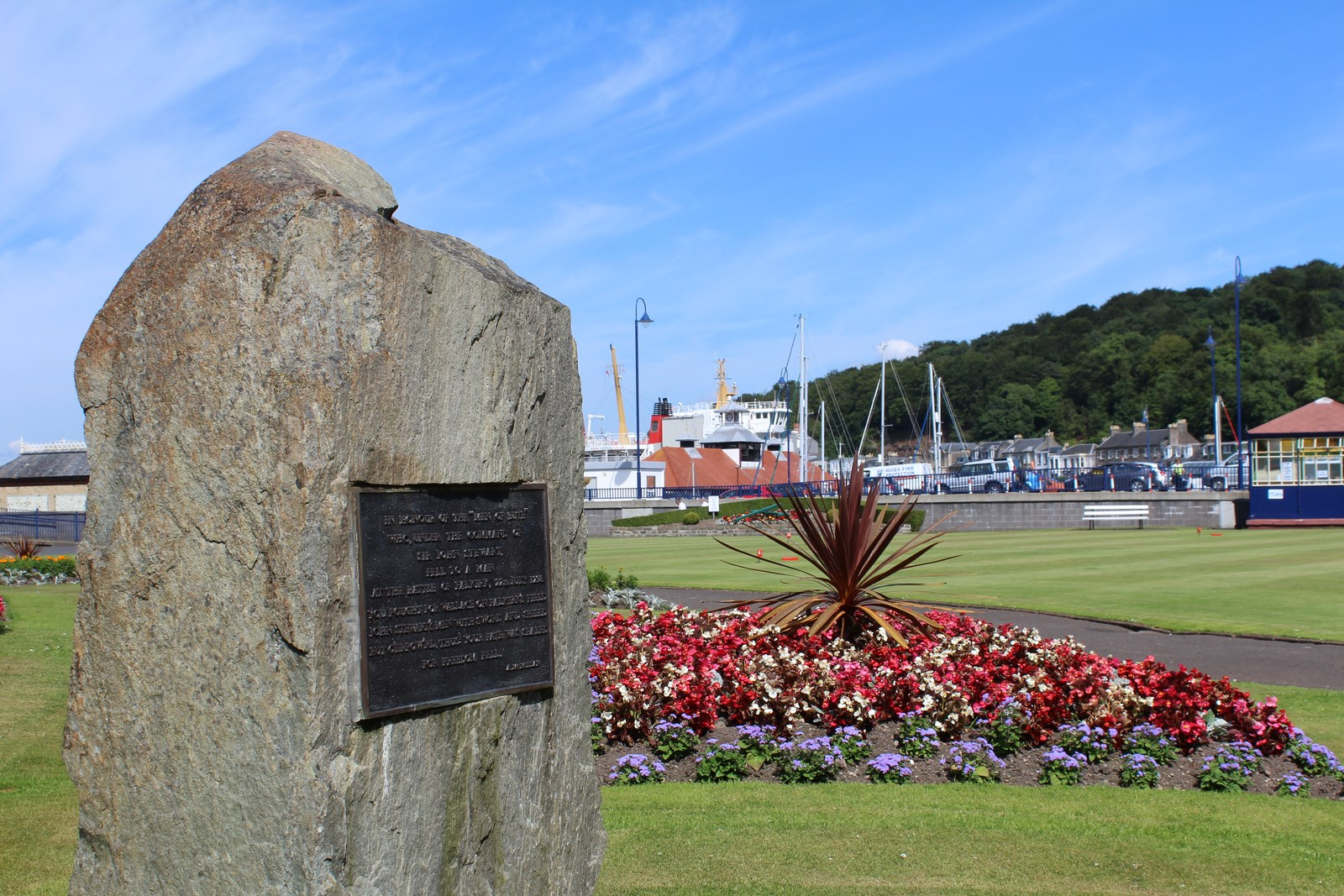
Memorial Stone & Esplanade Gardens, Rothesay. "In honour of the 'Men of Bute' who, under the command of Sir John Stewart, fell to a man at the Battle of Falkirk, 22nd July 1298. Who fought for Wallace on Falkirk's field, John Stewart's men with sword and shield but o'er pow'rd thus! Their fate was sealed for freedom fell."

Edward occupied Stirling and raided Perth, St. Andrews and Ayrshire. Yet, he retreated to Carlisle by 9 September. Edward invaded again in the summer of 1300.

Casualties among the Scottish leaders were not particularly heavy, but did include Wallace's second-in-command, Sir John de Graham, as well as Sir John Stewart, and Macduff of Fife.

In the words of Reid, "while unquestionably a good partisan leader, William Wallace's military abilities were simply not up to the job of organizing, training and leading a conventional military force." At Falkirk, Wallace "simply drew up his army in an open field and froze."

In the words of Evan Macleod Barron, it was Moray who "possessed military genius and military training", while Wallace possessed qualities that "make a great guerilla leader." Barron goes on to say, "Falkirk should never have been fought at all ... it hardly looks as if the brain which conceived the plan of battle at Falkirk was the same as that which conceived the plan at Stirling Bridge." Though Wallace resigned his leadership and guardianship, he still "represented the mass of the people." Hence Edward's determination to "capture at all costs the man who was in himself the embodiment of that popular hostility, and who was in addition, a warrior of skill and daring and a leader who had won the heart and the imagination of the people."

== Falkirk Roll of Arms ==
The Falkirk Roll is a collection of the arms of the English bannerets and noblemen present at the battle of Falkirk. It is the oldest-known English occasional roll of arms, and contains 111 names and blazoned shields.

Following are a collection of modern illustrations of the Falkirk Roll based on the blazons published in Henry Gough's book, Scotland in 1298. Documents Relating to the Campaign of King Edward the First.

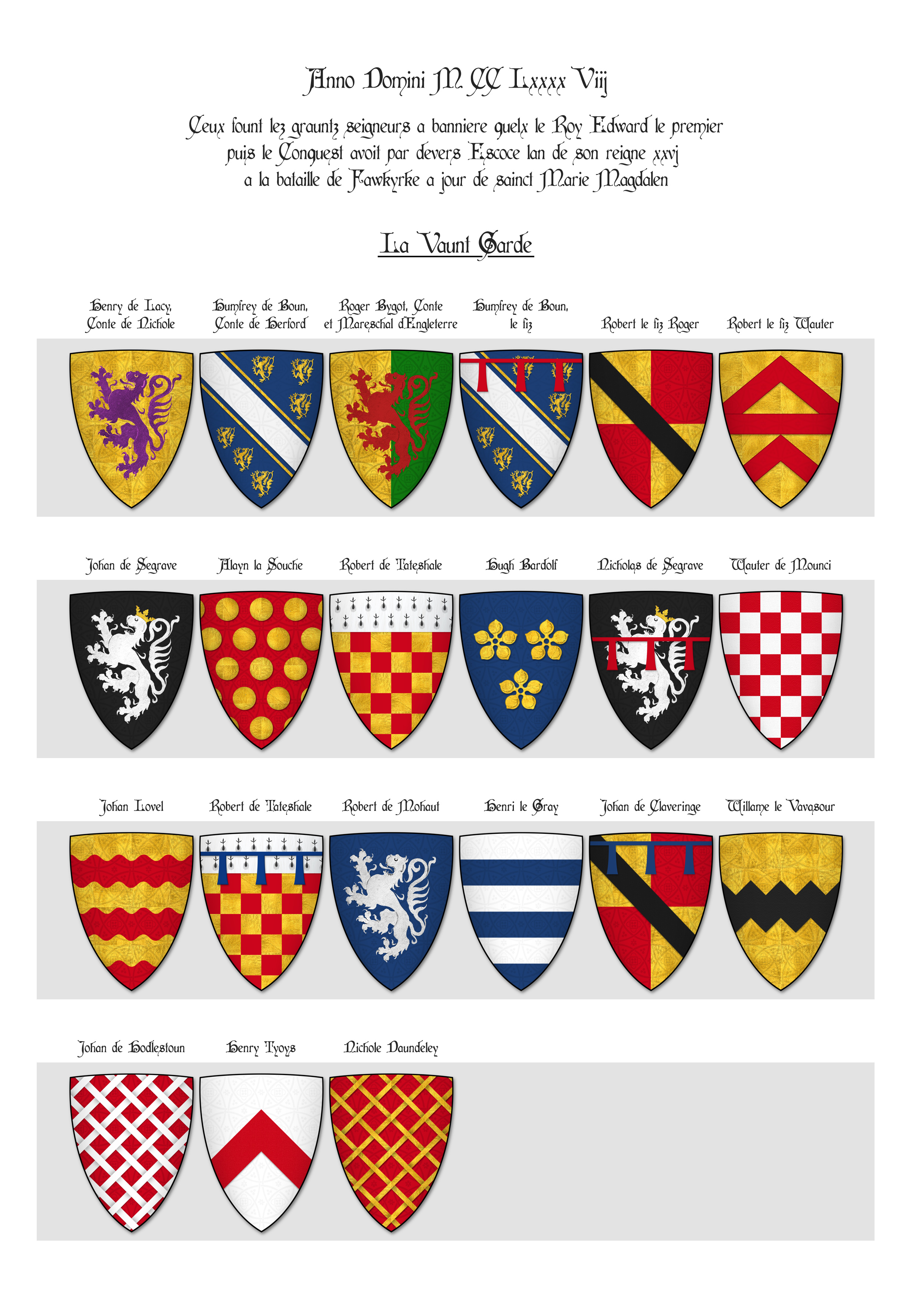
Panel 1 – La Vaunt Garde ("The Vanguard")

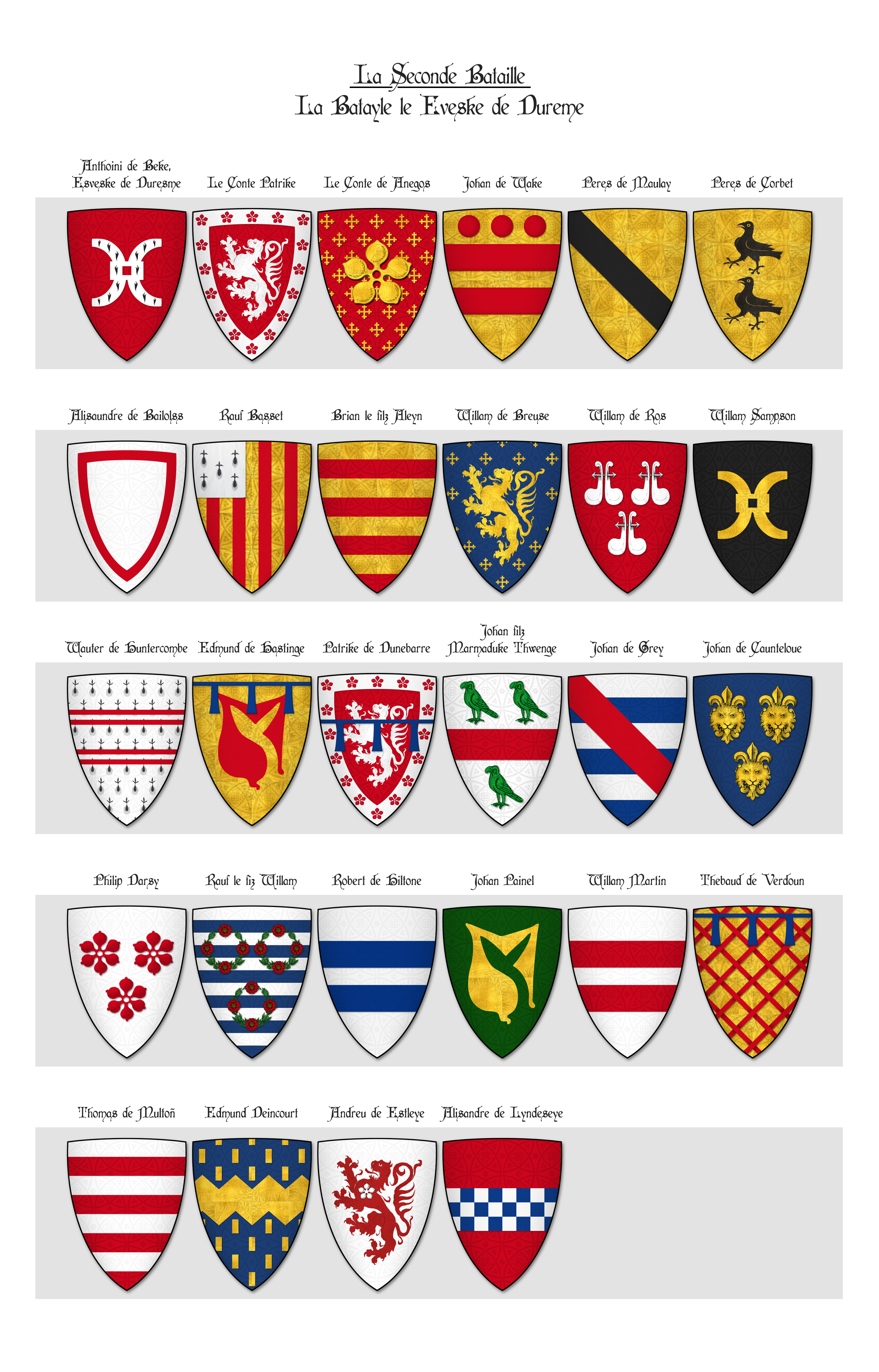
Panel 2 – La Batayle le Eveske de Dureme ("The Bishop of Durham's Battle")

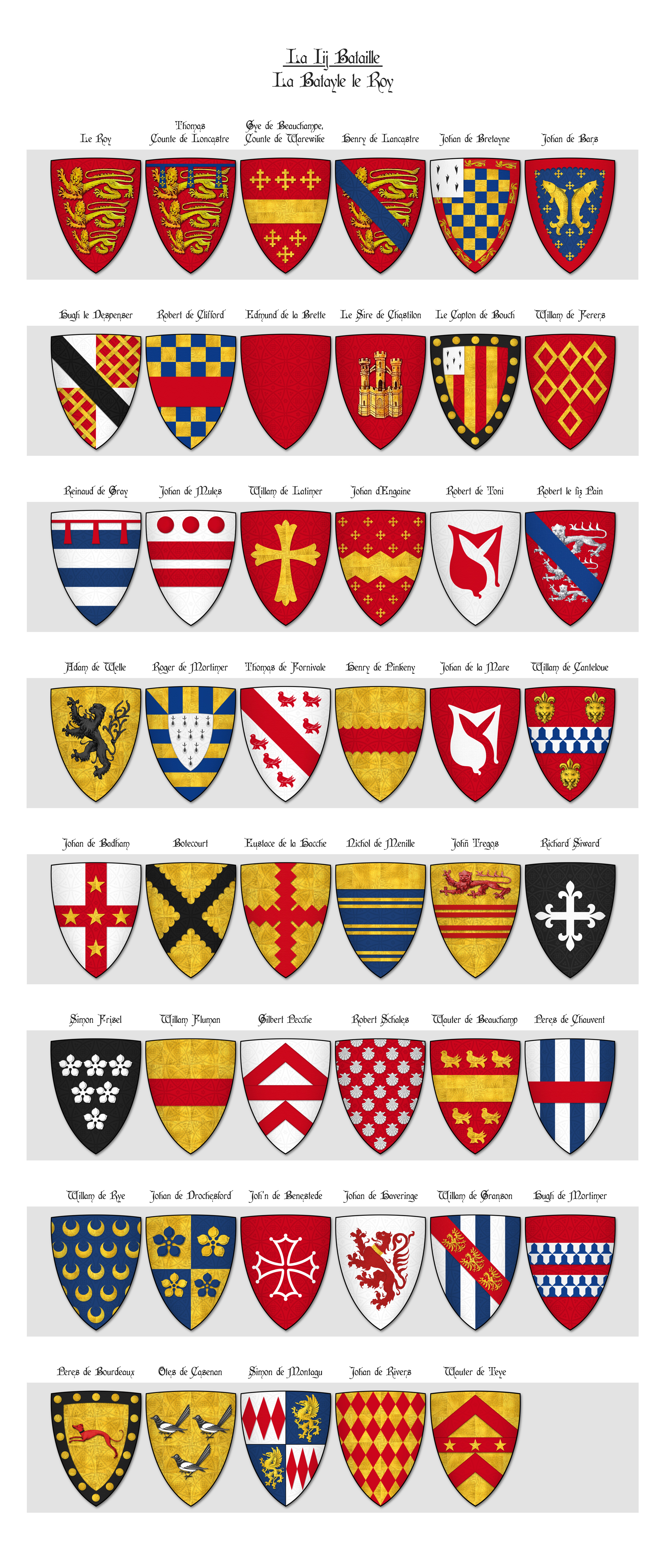
Panel 3 – La Bataille le Roy ("The King's Battle")

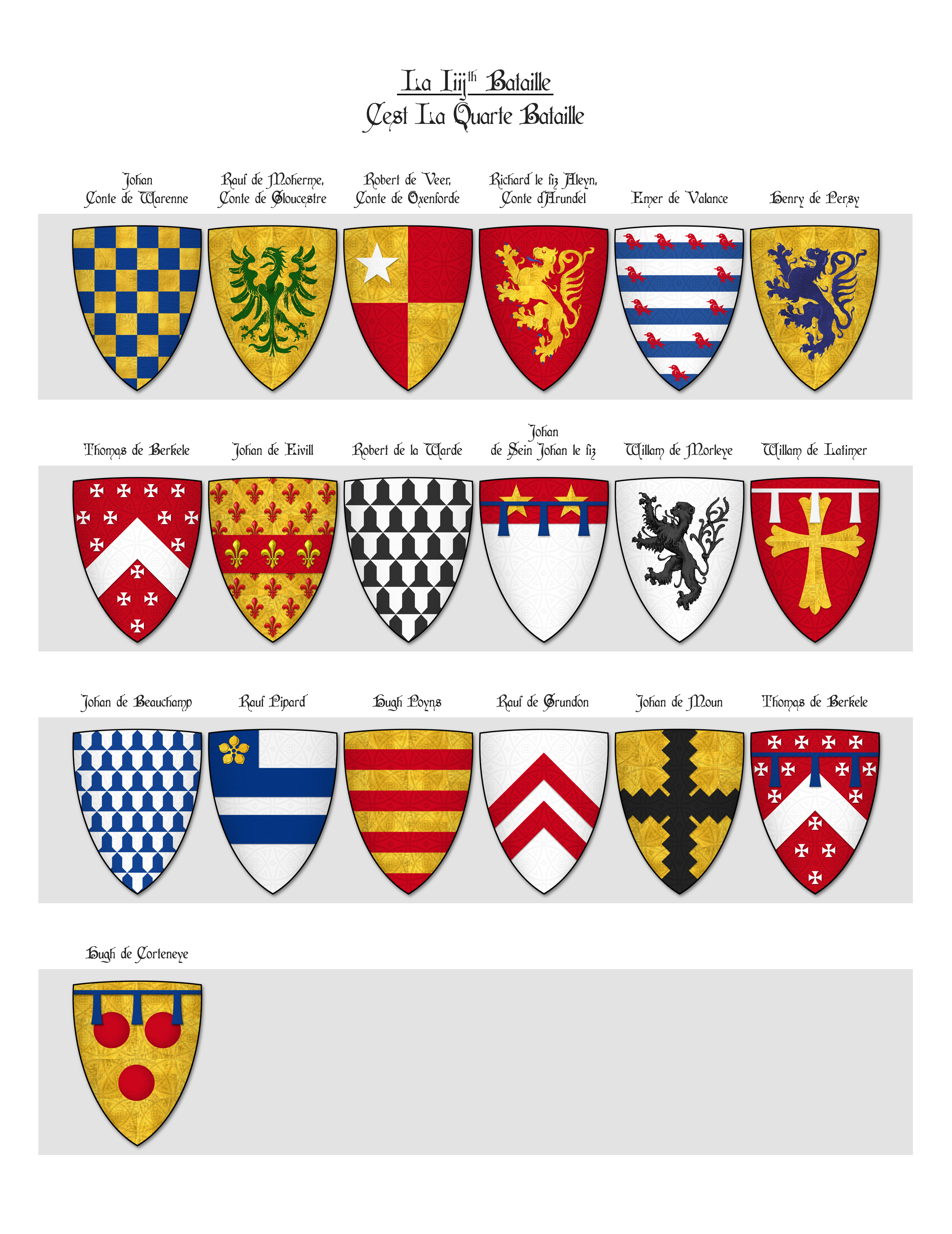
Panel 4 – La Quarte Bataille ("The Fourth Battle")

== Possible battle sites ==
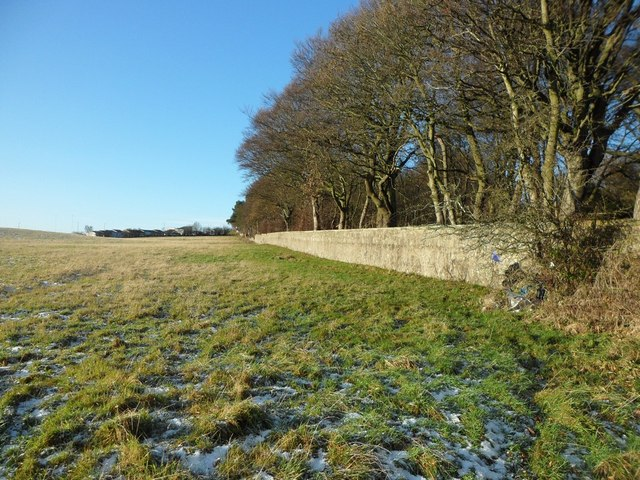
South edge of Callendar Wood

The site of the battle is uncertain. There have been three proposed sites: at Campfield, around the modern Central Retail Park; south of Callendar Woods (as depicted in the diagrams above), and; at Mumrills, the site of the Antonine Fort.

Walter of Guisborough stated that the Scots were positioned "on hard ground ... on one side of a hillock". The Scalacronica reported that the site was "on this side of Falkirk." Stuart Reid has suggested the burgh muir of Falkirk (i.e. "the plain which is called Falkirk"), while also acknowledging a consensus among historians, that located the Scots' position below Callendar Wood, with Glen Burn in front.
