= Comyn (surname) =

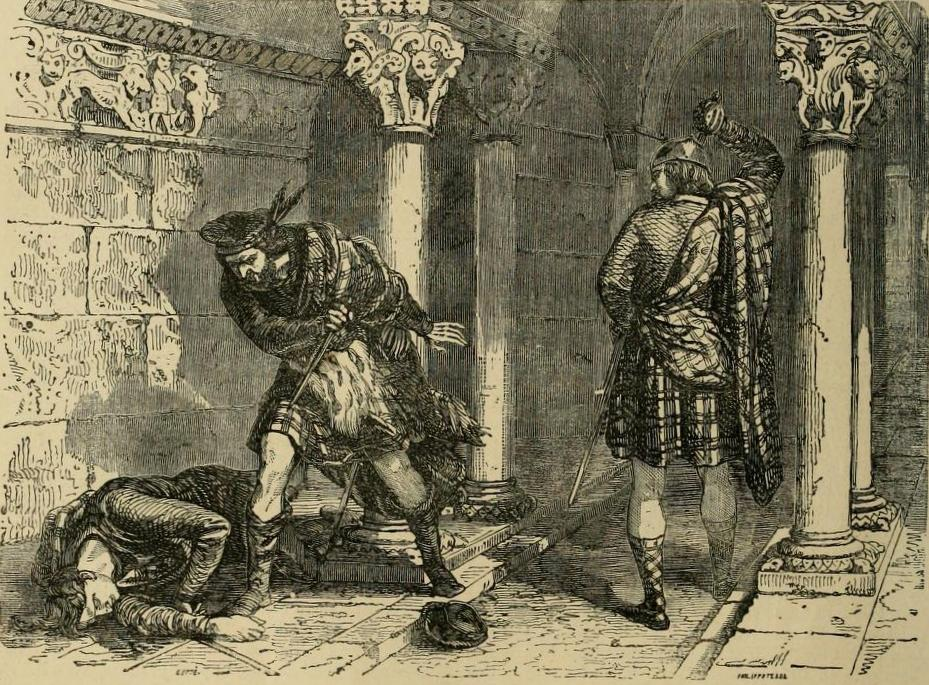
- The killing of John Comyn III
- Language: English, Scottish Gaelic

Other names
- Related names: Comins, Commons, Comyns, Cumin, Cumméne, Cumming, Cummings

Comyn is a surname.

As a Scottish surname, it is a Norman origin name originating in Scotland in the 12th with Clan Cumming and was commonly used by the Lords of Badenoch, the Lords of Kilbride and the Earls of Buchan.

As an Irish surname, unconnected to the Scottish version, it was anglicised from the Irish Gaelic surname Ó Comáin.

== List of persons with the surname ==
- Alexander Comyn (disambiguation)
  - Alexander Comyn, Earl of Buchan (died 1289)
  - Alexander Comyn (died 1308), Sheriff of Aberdeen
  - Alexander Comyn of Dunphail (died 1330)
- Alice Comyn, Countess of Buchan (1289–1349)
- Alison Comyn (born 1969), Irish television journalist/broadcaster and politician
- Andy Comyn (born 1968), English footballer
- Dan Comyn (1872–1949), Irish cricketer
- David Comyn (1854–1907), Irish language revivalist
- David Comyn, Lord of Kilbride (died 1247)
- Edmund Comyn (died 1314), Scottish noble
- Elizabeth de Comyn (1299–1372), English noblewoman
- Hugh Comyn (1876–1937), English civil servant and sportsman
- James Comyn (1921–1997), English High Court judge
- Jardine Comyn, Lord of Inverallochy
- John Comyn (disambiguation)
  - John Comyn (bishop) (c. 1150–1212), Archbishop of Dublin
  - John Comyn (died 1242), Earl of Angus
  - John Comyn I of Badenoch (c. 1215–1275)
  - John Comyn II of Badenoch (died 1302)
  - John Comyn III of Badenoch (c. 1274–1306)
  - John Comyn IV of Badenoch (c. 1294–1314)
  - John Comyn, Earl of Buchan (c. 1260–1308)
  - John Comyn of Ulceby (died c. 1332)
- Matt Comyn (born 1975), Australian banker
- Michael Comyn (1871–1952), Irish barrister
- Richard Comyn (d. c 1179), justiciar of Lothian
- Robert Comyn (disambiguation)
  - Robert Buckley Comyn (1792–1853), British judge
  - Robert Comyn (died 1306), Scottish nobleman
  - Robert Comyn (priest) (1672–1727), English priest
- Stephen George Comyn (1764–1839), English naval chaplain
- Valens Comyn (1688 –1751), English MP
- Walter Comyn, Lord of Badenoch (died 1258)
- William Comyn (disambiguation)
  - William Comyn, Lord of Badenoch (1163–1233)
  - William Comyn, Lord of Kilbride (died 1283)
  - William Leslie Comyn (1877–?), Californian businessman and shipbuilder
