= John Comyn (disambiguation) =

John Comyn may refer to:

- John Comyn (bishop) (1150–1212), Archbishop of Dublin
- John Comyn (died 1242), styled Earl of Angus
- John Comyn I of Badenoch (died c. 1275)
- John Comyn II of Badenoch (died 1302), son of John I, Guardian of Scotland
- John Comyn III of Badenoch (died 1306), killed by Robert the Bruce
- John Comyn IV of Badenoch (c. 1294–1314), son of John III
- John Comyn, Earl of Buchan (died 1308), cousin of John III
- John Comyn of Ulceby (died c. 1332), Anglo-Scottish noble

== See also ==
- John Comyns (1667–1740), English judge and MP
- John Cornyn (born 1952), American politician
