= The Lord of the Isles =

Poem by Walter Scott

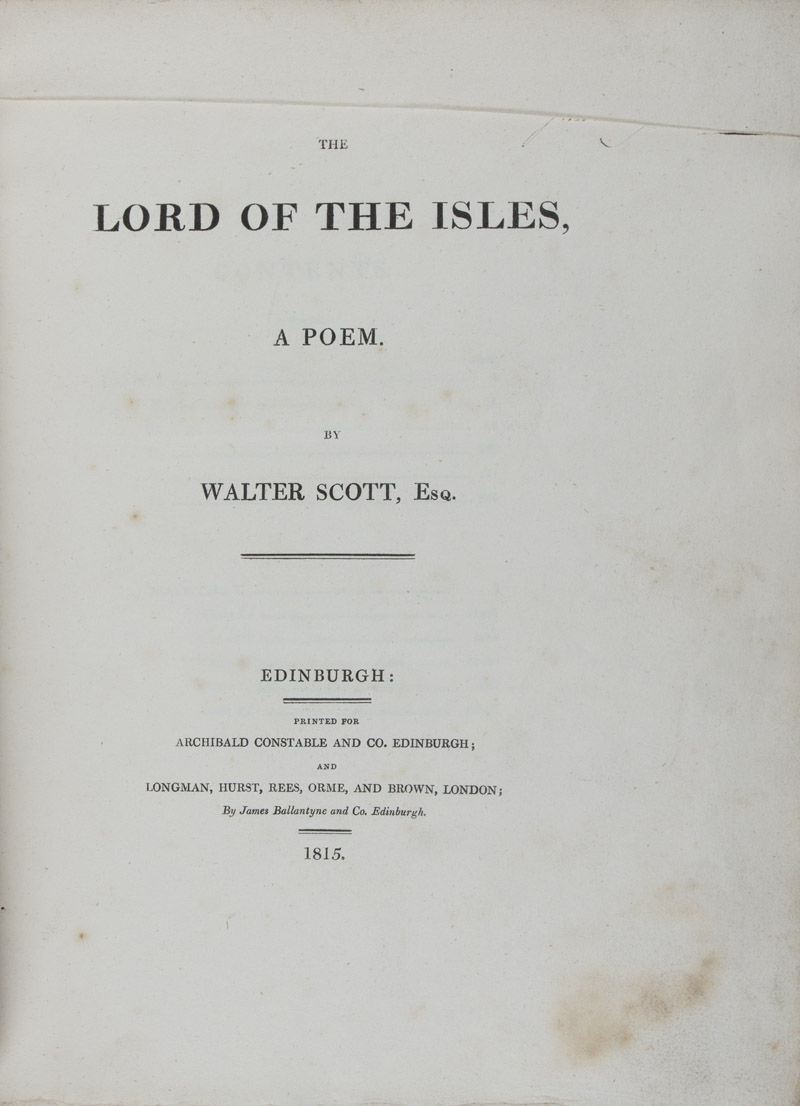
Title page of 1st edition

The Lord of the Isles is a narrative poem by Walter Scott in six cantos with substantial notes. Set in 1307 and 1314 Scotland it covers the story of Robert the Bruce from his return from exile in Ireland to the successful culmination of his struggle to secure Scottish independence from English control at the Battle of Bannockburn. Interwoven with this account is a romantic fiction centring on one of the Bruce's prominent supporters, Ronald, Lord of the Isles, involving his love for the Bruce's sister Isabel, who eventually takes the veil, and the transfer of his affections to Edith of Lorn to whom he had been betrothed at the beginning of the poem and whom he marries at the end.

== Background ==
The first hints of The Lord of the Isles can be found in two letters of 1808 and 1810 from Scott to Joanna Baillie: in 1808 he expressed his hope that he would one day include the Battle of Bannockburn in a poem, and in 1810 he states that if he writes another poem (after The Lady of the Lake) he intends 'to take the Hebridean character and scenery with that of the North of Ireland for [his] subject'. It seems that Scott made a substantial start on the poem featuring the Bruce, then called 'The Nameless Glen', in late 1811 or early 1812, but he laid it aside for Rokeby, begun in the spring of the latter year. With Rokeby completed at the end of 1812 Scott's thoughts turned again to the Bruce poem: in June 1813 he offered a half share in the poem to Archibald Constable for £2500 (or the whole for £5000), but the contract eventually concluded on 22 July 1815 set this sum at 1500 guineas (£1575). Scott's creative energies during 1813 and 1814 had been devoted mainly to the completion of his first novel Waverley. In August and early September 1814 he arranged to join a voyage to inspect the lighthouses around the Scottish coast on the cutter of the Commissioners for the Northern Lights so that when he resumed work on The Lord of the Isles he would be 'strong on scenery'. He had hoped to have the work ready for the Christmas trade, but although he made good progress it took a month longer than he had anticipated: Canto 3 was complete by 10 November, and the last stanza of the sixth and final canto was sent off on 16 December.

== Editions ==
The Lord of the Isles was published on 2 January in Edinburgh by Archibald Constable and Co. and on 13 January in London by Longman, Hurst, Rees, Orme, and Brown. The price was two guineas (£2 2s or £2.10), and 1750 copies were printed. Two further less expensive editions appeared in March and April (14s or 70p), adding a further 12,000 copies. In 1830 Scott provided the poem with a new Introduction in Volume 9 of the 11-volume set of The Poetical Works.

A critical edition is due to be published as Volume 6 of The Edinburgh Edition of Walter Scott's Poetry by Edinburgh University Press.

== Canto summary ==
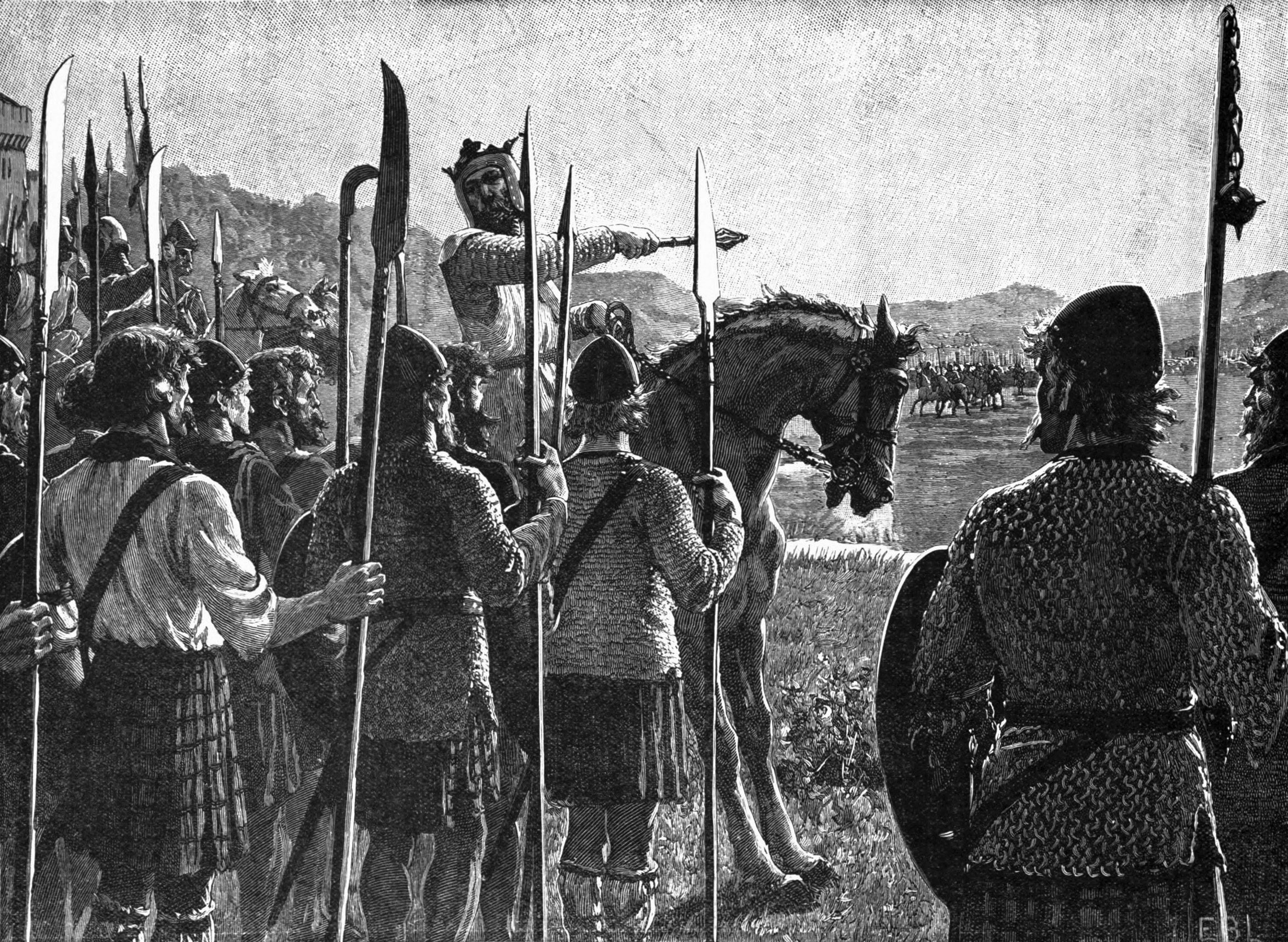
Bruce addresses his troops on the field of Bannockburn

Canto 1: In 1307 at Artornish Castle, Edith of Lorn gloomily awaits the arrival of her bridegroom Ronald, Lord of the Isles, believing that he does not love her. Ronald's fleet passes a skiff containing two knights and a maiden [Robert the Bruce, his brother Edward, and their sister Isabel] who are granted shelter at the castle.

Canto 2: The elder knight is recognised by Edith's brother the Lord of Lorn as the Bruce, who had murdered his father-in-law the Red Comyn in Greyfriars Church, Dumfries. Swords are drawn, and Isabel makes an appeal for peace, nominally to the visiting English knight De Argentine but in fact to Ronald whose response indicates that he is in love with her. De Argentine seeks to arrest the Bruce in the name of the King of England, but the Abbot who arrives to conduct the wedding, after trying to pronounce a curse on the Bruce as an excommunicated murderer, is moved instead to acclaim him as the rightful king of Scotland before sailing off again.

Canto 3: Ronald pledges his loyalty to the Bruce, and they leave for Skye while Edward escorts Isabel to Ireland. Edith and her stepmother Morag have fled with the Abbot's party. On Skye the Bruce and Ronald are attacked by a band of Lorn supporters who slay Ronald's page as he mounts guard but are all killed in their turn. A mute minstrel boy captured at sea by the band survives and joins the Bruce and Ronald.

Canto 4: Edward arrives on Skye to announce that King Edward has died and that forces are assembling to support the Bruce who leaves to meet them on Arran. There he visits Isabel in St Bride's convent, to which she has been entrusted by Edward, and presses Ronald's claims to her affections (at his request). However, she says that her thoughts are fixed on heaven, and that Ronald should marry Edith as arranged unless she renounces him by returning his ring. The Bruce leaves to arrange for a message to be sent to a bedesman Cuthbert in Carrick on the mainland opposite to kindle a beacon when the time is propitious for him to cross over.

Canto 5: The next morning, Isabel finds Ronald's ring on the floor of her cell with a covering note from Edith and realises the page, who has now disappeared, must be Edith. She sends a priest to ask that the Bruce, or at least the page, should return to the convent, but the Bruce discovers that Edward has sent the page to carry the Bruce's mandate to Cuthbert. When the Bruce arrives at Carrick in response to the beacon, he is met by the page bearing a message from Cuthbert warning him that the light was deceptive and that the English forces under Clifford are strong, but he decides to press on regardless. Ronald takes charge of the page, but the 'boy' is captured by some of Clifford's men from Turnberry Castle and led to execution. The Bruce and Ronald capture the castle and rescue the page (now known as Amadine).

Canto 6: The Bruce sends Amadine to join Isabel at St Bride's where they pass some years in calm seclusion, Isabel taking the veil. In 1314 Isabel advises Edith (with the Bruce's knowledge and consent) to reassume her page disguise to test the sincerity of Ronald's reported repentance of his breach of faith. Amadine/Edith arrives at Bannockburn on the eve of the battle for Stirling Castle, the last English possession in Scotland. During the battle the apparently mute Amadine spurs the onlookers to join in the conflict. De Argentine is one of the English slain as their army is defeated. The Bruce prepares to attend the wedding of Ronald and Edith.

== Reception ==
Although The Lord was not judged the best of Scott's poems it met with a generally favourable reception. Its weakest feature was the unsatisfactory relationship between the historical and fictitious elements, Francis Jeffrey writing in The Edinburgh Review: 'we continue to look for the resumption of that wilder legend, long after the Bruce has filled the scene with his own real presence; and, of course, lend but a careless ear to the first exploits of him whom we do not immediately recognize as its proper hero'. Generally the characters were thought somewhat lacking in interest. The concluding description of Bannockburn was pronounced fine, but inferior to that of Flodden which ends Marmion.
