= John de Seton =

13th-century Scottish knight

- Born: England
- Died: 1306; Newcastle upon Tyne, England
- Parents: John de Seton; Erminia Lascelles

Sir John de Seton (died 4 August 1306) was a knight who took part in the First War of Scottish Independence as a supporter of Robert de Brus. He held lands in England and Scotland.

Seton was a son of Sir John de Seton of Skelton, Cumberland, and Erminia Lascelles. His brothers were Christopher and Humphrey de Seton. This branch of the Seton family had long served the Bruces in Yorkshire, Cumberland and Scotland.

John performed fealty to King Edward I of England at Berwick on 28 August 1296. Seton was present on 10 February 1306 when Sir John Comyn, Lord of Badenoch was stabbed by Robert de Brus in Greyfriars Church, Dumfries. A letter of excommunication was issued naming the Robert de Brus, Earl of Carrick and three other knights—Sir Alexander Lindsay, Sir Christopher Seton and his brother John—as John Comyn's murderers.

He was captured by English forces after the fall of Tibbers Castle in 1306. John was hanged and drawn at Newcastle upon Tyne on 4 August 1306. He was executed on the basis that he was a witness to the murder of John Comyn, Lord of Badenoch by Robert de Brus, Earl of Carrick at Dumfries and for holding Tibbers Castle against Edward I. His lands in Cumnock, Ayrshire were given to Roger, son of Finlay, in a charter from Robert de Brus, where it mentions a brother and a son.
