= John Russell (died 1270) =

13th-century Anglo-Scottish noble

Sir John Russell (died 1270), was an Anglo-Scottish noble. He was a younger son of John Russell of Kingston Russell and Dyrham and Rohesia Bardolf.

He married Isabella, Countess of Menteith shortly after the death of her first husband Walter Comyn, Lord of Badenoch in 1258. By 1259, allegations were made against Isabella and John for poisoning her former husband. They were consequently imprisoned, found not guilty, but expelled from Scotland in disgrace. Walter Stewart was able to successfully claim the earldom for his wife Mary, Isabella's sister. John died in 1270. He was survived by his daughter Isabella, who married William Comyn of Kirkintilloch.
