= Clan Galbraith =

Scottish clan

- Clann a' Bhreatannaich, Mac a' Bhreatannaich
- Crest: bear's head couped argent muzzled azure
- Motto: AB OBICE SUAVIOR "Gentler Because of the Obstruction" or AB OBICE SAEVIOR "Fiercer Because of the Obstruction"

Profile
- Region: Lowlands
- District: Stirlingshire
- Clan Galbraith no longer has a chief, and is an armigerous clan
- Historic seat: Culcreuch Castle
- Last Chief: Galbraith of Culcreuch

Clan Galbraith is a Scottish clan. The clan does not have a chief recognised by the Lord Lyon King of Arms. Because of this, the clan is considered an armigerous clan, and as such Clan Galbraith has no standing under Scots Law. The clan-name of Galbraith is of Gaelic origin, however its meaning denotes the bearer as of Brythonic origin, as opposed to Gaelic. The early Galbraiths were centred in the Lennox district, which spans the Highland and Lowland border of Scotland. The 17th chief of the clan brought ruin to the clan in the late 16th and early 17th century, and eventually lost his lands and fled Scotland for Ireland. His grandson, the 19th chief, was the last chief of Clan Galbraith.

== Origin of the clan ==
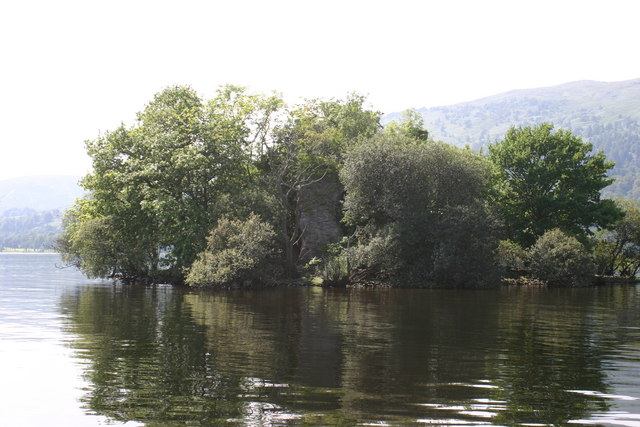
Inchgalbraith, on the west side of Loch Lomond, was the stronghold of early recorded Galbraiths.

The surname Galbraith is of Gaelic origin. The name is derived from the elements gall ("stranger") + Breathnach ("Briton"), meaning "British foreigner". The elements used in the surname would denote the differences between the Gaels—who have been generally thought to have begun migration to Scotland in about the 5th century—and the native Welsh speaking Britons, particularly those of the Kingdom of Strathclyde. The Strathclyde Britons remained a distinct ethnic group from both the Highland Gaels and Lowland Angles until the 14th century. The former capital of the Kingdom of Strathclyde was Dumbarton ("Fortress of the Britons"), in the Lennox.

In Scottish Gaelic the Galbraiths are called na Breatannaich or Clann a' Bhreatannaich, meaning "Britons" and "Children of the Britons". The early Galbraiths held lands in the Lennox, in the area of Loch Lomond, north of Dumbarton. The stronghold of these early Galbraiths was on the island of Inchgalbraith which is located on the west side of Loch Lomond about 2 miles south-east of Luss. The heraldist Iain Moncreiffe of that Ilk speculated that the Arms of the Galbraiths—which bore three bears' heads—may allude to the British name Arthur that is thought by some to mean "bear".

== History ==
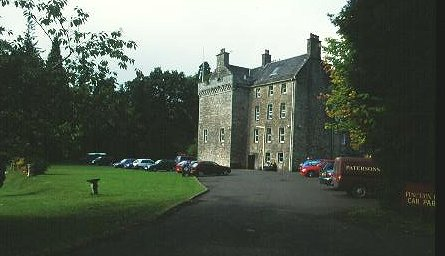
Culcreuch Castle, former seat of the chiefs of Clan Galbraith.

The man who is considered to be first chief of Clan Galbraith was Gilchrist Bretnach who married the granddaughter of the first Earl of Lennox.

The fourth chief, Sir William Galbraith of Buthernock, married a sister of "Black Comyn" who was head of the most powerful family in Scotland at the time. Sir William, however, sided against the Comyns when he had a part in the rescue of the boy king Alexander III from Comyn's control. Ultimately Sir William rose in power to become one of the co-Regents of Scotland in 1255. Sir William's son, the fifth chief of the clan, Sir Arthur, supported Robert the Bruce, and also married a sister of Sir James Douglas. "Good Sir James Douglas" is famous for perishing in Spain against the Saracens, while leading a small band of Scottish knights carrying Bruce's heart to the Holy Land.

A branch of the Galbraiths held Culcreuch in Strathendrick in 1320, and before the end of that century had inherited the leadership of the clan. In 1425 the ninth chief, James Galbraith of Culcreuch, joined the rebellion of James Mor Stewart against King James I of Scotland, in support of the overthrown regent Murdoch Stewart, Duke of Albany. As many as 600 members of the clan were forced to flee after the failure of the revolt, exiled to Kintyre and the Isle of Gigha, where they adopted the new name of MacBhreatneaich or M'Vretny ("son of the Briton").

In 1489 the twelfth chief, Thomas Galbraith of Culcreuch, was captured by James IV and hanged.

=== Fall of the clan ===
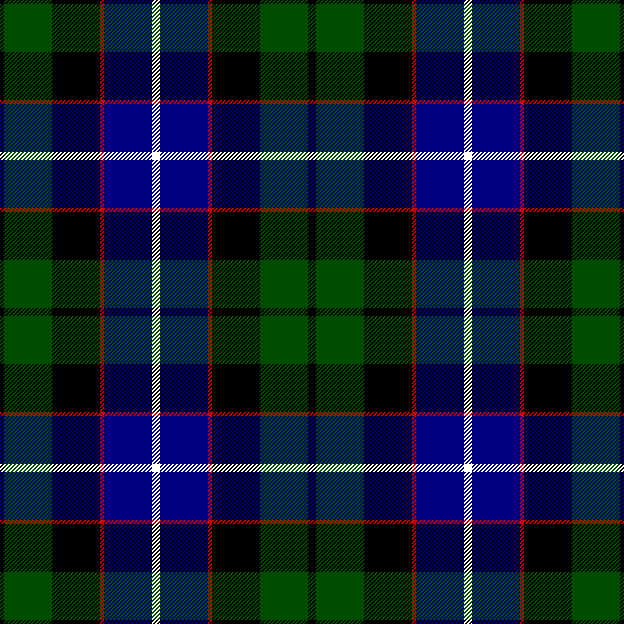
The Galbraith tartan.

The 17th chief of Clan Galbraith, Robert Galbraith of Culcreuch, brought ruin to the clan. Sometime before 1593 Culcreuch's widowed mother married, against his wishes, the chief of the Clan MacAulay, Aulay MacAulay of Ardincaple. Culcreuch's animosity towards Ardincaple was so much that Culcreuch was said to have "gevin vp kindnes, and denunceit his euill-will to him [Ardincaple] with solempne vowis of revenge". In spring of 1593, Culcreuch purchased a commission of Justiciary, (a commission of fire and sword), to pursue the Clan Gregor and "their ressetters and assisters". Both the MacAulays and Colquhouns were suspicious of Galbraith's real intentions, and on 3 May 1593 the lairds of the two clans complained that Culcreuch had only purchased the commission under counsel from George Buchanan and that Culcreuch had no intentions of actually harassing the MacGregors. It seemed more likely that the Galbraiths, allied with the Buchanans would direct their vengeance against the MacAulays and Colquhouns, under the guise of hunting and clearing the Clan Gregor from the Lennox. Ultimately Robert Galbraith's letter of commission was taken from him. In 1612 Robert and his wife, likely from pressure from higher up, gave up possession of West Milligs, to his mother, who had married Ardincaple. Thus West Milligs, which adjoined Ardincaple (modern day Helensburgh) and had been held by the Galbraiths of Culcreuch since at least the mid 15th century, was lost to the MacAulays of Ardincaple.

In 1622, Robert Galbraith, Laird of Culcreuch, was in debt to his brother-in-law (whom he attempted to assassinate), was denounced as a rebel, and forced to give up Culcreuch Castle. Galbraith then fled Scotland for Ireland where he died ten years later, leaving nothing for his son to inherit, and his grandson the 19th Chief of Clan Galbraith was the last of his line.

== Modern clan symbolism ==
Today members of Scottish clans may show their clan allegiance by wearing Scottish crest badges and clan tartans. But usually not: the vast majority of the Scottish population of any surname show no crest or badges and demonstrate no such “clan allegiance”. The long history of Scotland's chiefly lineages exploiting clan members in the name of kinship, as personal troops and as disposable economic units, and the continuation of exploitation into the 20th century, explains this. The crest badge deemed suitable for clan members to wear contains the heraldic crest of a bear's head couped argent muzzled azure, and the heraldic motto AB OBICE SUAVIOR which translates from Latin as "gentler because of the obstruction". The motto is derived from a phrase in Ovid's Metamorphoses "ab obice saevior" ("fiercer because of the obstruction", describing a river which when dammed only flowed more violently), but inverted by changing "saevior" ("fiercer") for "suavior" ("gentler"), according to John D. Christie, reflecting the bear's muzzle on the heraldic crest. The "Galbraith" tartan is known by several different names, including Russell, Mitchell and Hunter. The tartan was known as Galbraith in the collections of the Highland Society of London. The tartan is recorded by William Wilson and Sons of Bannockburn as a Hunter in 1819, and a Russell in 1847.

== See also ==
- Galbraith
- Culcreuch Castle
