= Walter Bailloch =

Earl of Menteith jure uxoris

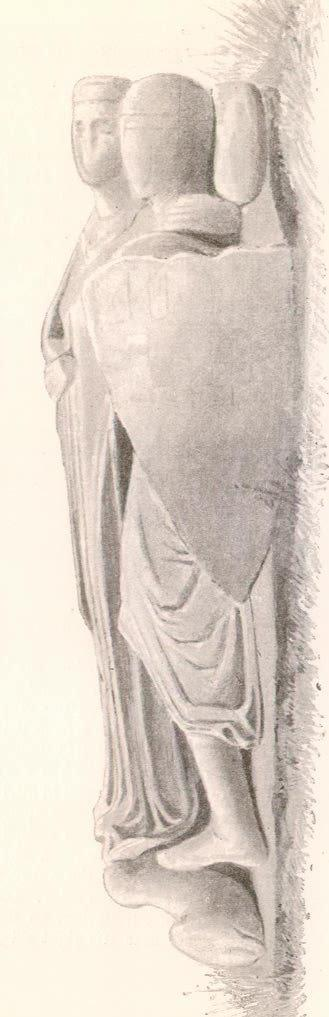
The tomb effigies of Walter and his wife, Mary I, Countess of Menteith, at Inchmahome Priory in Menteith.

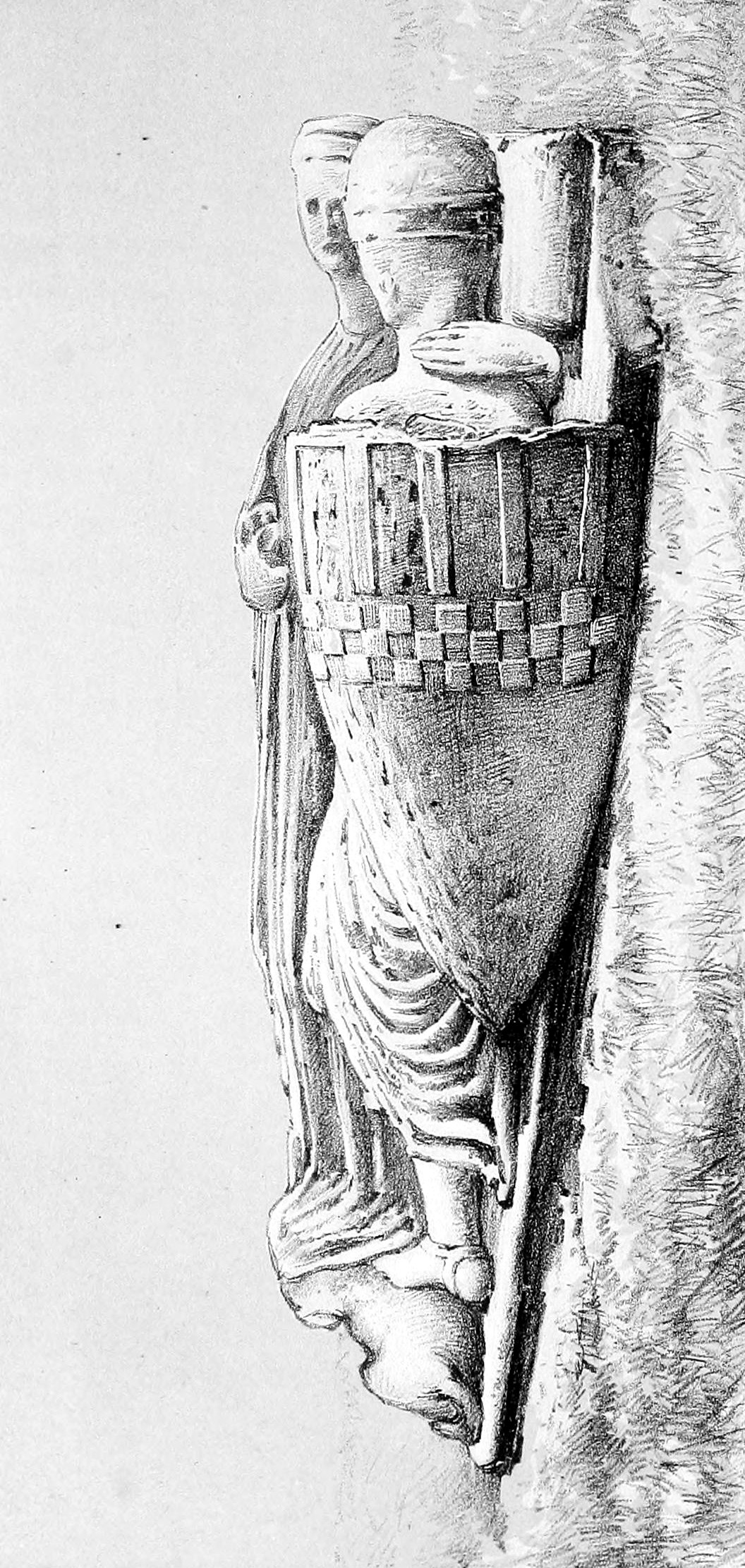
The effigy of Walter and his wife, Mary I, Countess of Menteith.

Walter Bailloch, also known as Walter Bailloch Stewart (1225/1230 – 1293/1294), was distinguished by the sobriquet Bailloch or Balloch, a Gaelic nickname roughly translated as "the Freckled". He was the Earl of Menteith jure uxoris.

== Life ==
Walter was a younger son of Walter Stewart, 3rd High Steward of Scotland, and his wife Bethóc or Beatrix Mac Gille Críst of Angus, daughter of Gilchrist, Earl of Angus, and wife Marjorie of Huntingdon, granddaughter of David I. In 1258–59, Walter accompanied Louis IX of France on his Crusade, according to tradition. After the death of King Alexander II of Scotland he was aligned with the "English faction", and in 1255 secured the persons of the young King and Queen, but he was not at this time allowed to a share in the government. About 1260, when Isabella, Countess of Menteith and her husband Walter Comyn, Lord of Badenoch were forced to leave Scotland, the magnates of Scotland arranged the marriage of her sister, Mary, Countess of Menteith, to Walter Stewart, who took possession of the lands and title, with questions of legal ownership being reserved. He was certainly using the title of earl (jure uxoris) before 17 April 1261, when he was witness to a grant to the Paisley Abbey.

In the following year Dubhghall mac Suibhne granted to the earl the lands of Skipnish, Killislate, and others, being that part of Kintyre called South Knapdale and the parish of Kilcalmonell. Following on this, the Earl granted the church of Kilcalmonell at Clachan to the monks of Paisley. He also made grants to Kilwinning Abbey of churches in Knapdale, which show that he had possession of North Knapdale also. About 1263 the earl was Sheriff of Ayr, and aided in making preparations to repel the expected invasion of King Haakon IV of Norway. He and his brother Alexander Stewart, 4th High Steward of Scotland were joint commanders of the Scots in the Battle of Largs. The earl was Sheriff of Dumbarton in 1271 until 1288. On 25 July 1281 he was one of the witnesses to and guarantors of the marriage contract of the Princess Margaret with Eirik II of Norway. He, Countess Mary, and a party of Scots barons traveled to Norway accompanying the princess and her dowry of fourteen thousand marks. In 1285 he and his Countess were again attacked by the rival claimants William Comyn and his wife Isabella, their claim having been in 1282 pressed upon King Alexander III of Scotland by the English King, and in a Parliament at Scone it was decided that the earldom should be divided into two portions.

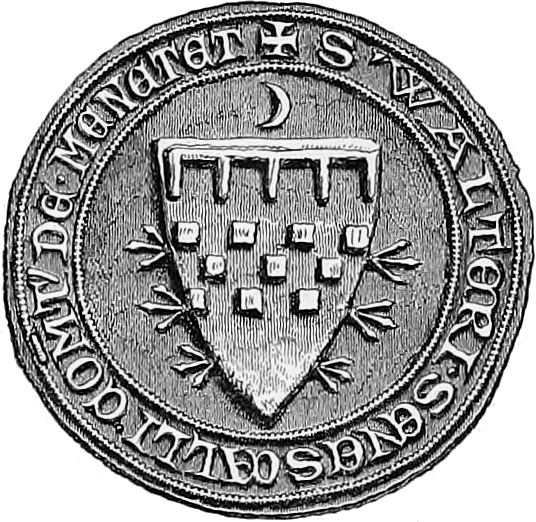
Seal of Walter Stewart Earl of Menteith, 1292. A shield vearing a fess cheque, with a labe of five points as a difference. Above the shield is a crescent. On each side of the shield appear three projections resembling eagles' feet. "S' Walteri Senescalli Comt' de Menetet."

One half was retained by Walter Stewart, with the title of earl, and the other half was erected into a barony for William, the son of John the Red Comyn, and his wife, a daughter of the elder countess by her first husband. The component parts of the earldom which remained to Walter Stewart are not known. The death of King Alexander in 1286 threw the kingdom again into confusion, and during the rivalry which ensued between the parties of Bruce and Balliol, the Earl of Menteith supported the cause of Bruce. Walter was a party to the Turnberry Bond with his sons Alexander and John and the Bruces, which was signed at Turnberry Castle on 20 September 1286. In 1289 he was present at Birgham, and approved of the marriage proposed between Prince Edward of England and the young Margaret, Maid of Norway as she was called, the heiress of the Scottish Crown.

Her unhappy death renewed the contest between Bruce and Balliol, and when it was proposed that the King of England should arbitrate, Menteith was one of those named by Bruce as his commissioners. He was present at Norham on 20 November 1292 when the new king John Balliol swore fealty to Edward I of England. This is the last certain record of him, as although letters were addressed by the English King to Walter Stewart, Earl of Menteith, on 29 June 1294, it is not clear that he was then alive. He may even have been dead by 10 February 1293, when Balliol's Parliament directed the lands of Knapdale belonging to the earl to be incorporated in the sheriffdom of Lorn under Alexander of Argyll.

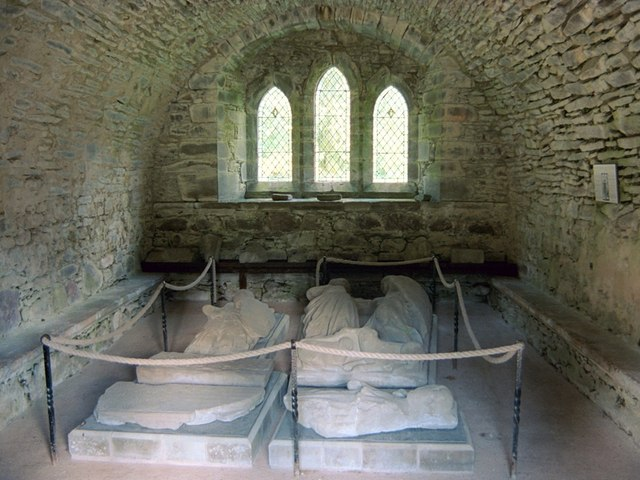
View of the Chapter House of Inchmahome Priory; effigies on the right represent the Countess Mary and Walter, Earl of Menteith.

The Countess Mary predeceased her husband, probably before 1286. Their tombstone is preserved in the Priory of Inchmahome, bearing the effigies of husband and wife, the former bearing on his shield the Stewart fess chequy with a label of five points, a device which also appears on his seal of arms in the Public Record Office, London.

== Family ==
In 1258 Walter married Mary I, Countess of Menteith. Walter, third son to the 3rd High Steward, took the name of Menteith after succeeding to the Earldom of Menteith in right of his wife, and differenced the Stewart arms by changing the fess to a bend and the Azure squares of the check to Sable. They had two sons as issue, both of whom assumed the surname Menteith and at least one daughter.

- Alexander, Earl of Menteith, who succeeded to the earldom.
- Sir John de Menteith, notorious as the betrayer of Sir William Wallace.
- Elena Stewart, who married Sir John Drummond (aft. 1240–1301), Thane of Lennox, Chief of Clan Drummond, son of Sir Malcolm de Drummond (aft. 1209–1278), Thane of Lennox, and paternal grandson of Sir Malcolm Beg de Drummond (aft. 1169–1259), Thane of Lennox, and wife Ada of Lennox, daughter of Maol Domhnaich, Earl of Lennox, and wife Elizabeth or Beatrix Stewart, and had issue:
  - Sir Malcolm Drummond (aft. 1270–1325), Thane of Lennox, who fought in the Battle of Dunbar in 1296, where he was captured by the English, and in 1301 was again captured by the English, and in the Battle of Bannockburn in 1314, married to ... de Graham, daughter of Sir Patrick de Graham of Kincardine and wife Annabella of Strathearn, and had issue
  - Gilbert Drummond, who was granted the lands and church of Kilpatrick, as Gilbert de Drumund of Dumbarton appears on the Ragman Rolls of 1296 swearing fealty to Edward I of England
  - Walter Drummond, Scottish Ambassador to England and Secretary to King Robert the Bruce
  - Christian Drummond, who received grants of lands in Ardcurane from Maol Choluim I, Earl of Lennox
  - Margaret Drummond, who received grants of lands in Ardcurane from Maol Choluim I, Earl of Lennox

== See also ==
- Brown, Michael, The Wars of Scotland, 1214-1371, (Edinburgh, 2004)
- Brydall, Robert, "Monumental Effigies of Scotland, from the Thirteenth Century to the Fifteenth Century", in the Proceedings of the Society of Antiquaries of Scotland, 29 (1894–95), figure 15, p. 353.
