= Mary I, Countess of Menteith =

Scottish noble

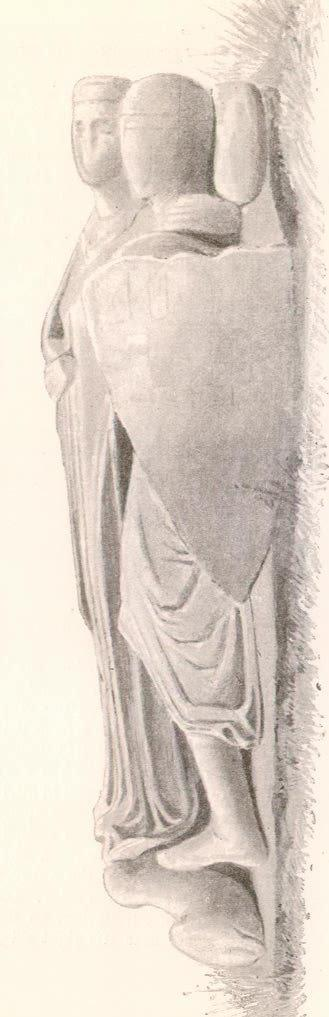
The tomb effigies of Mary and her husband, Walter Bailloch, at Inchmahome Priory in Menteith.

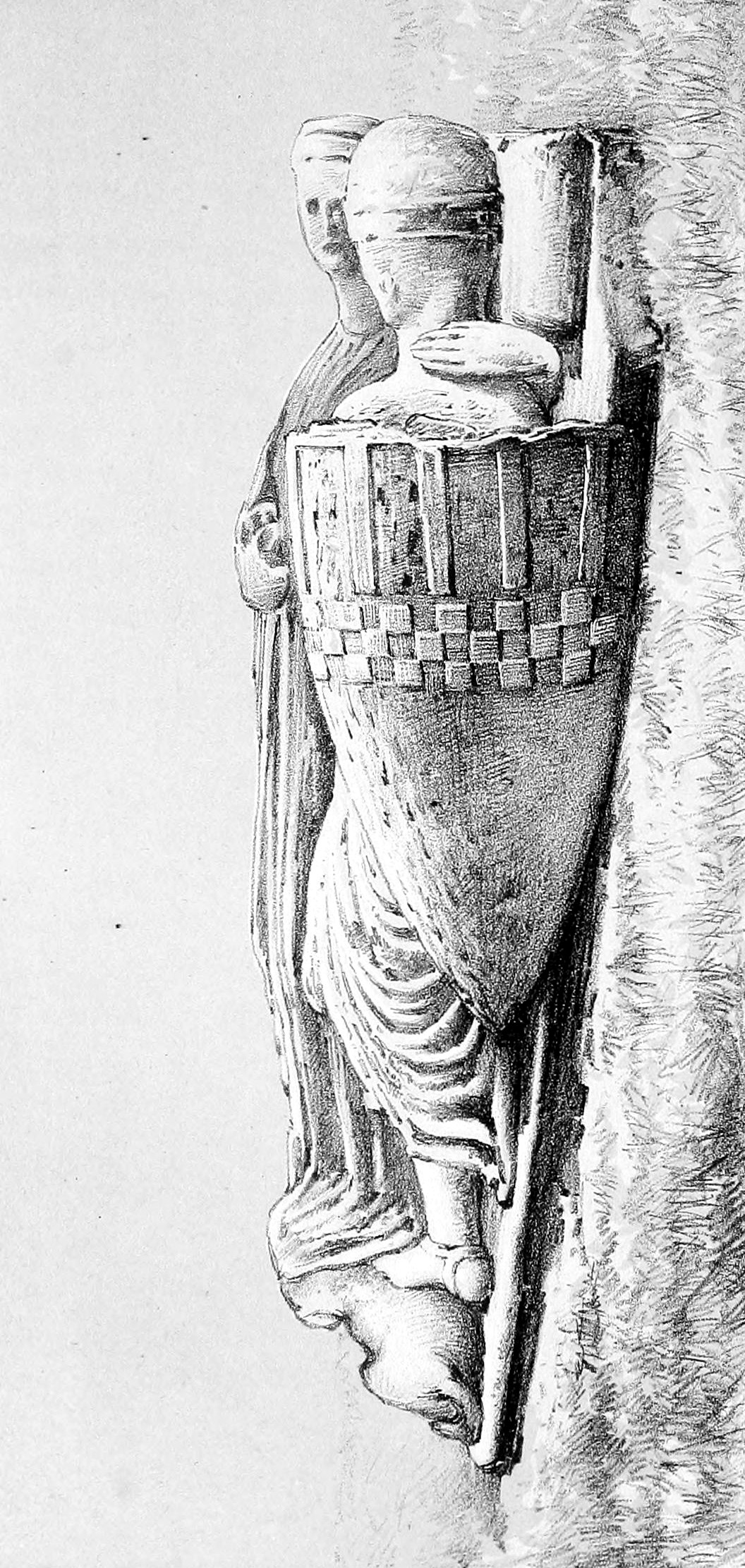
The effigy of Mary and her husband, Walter Bailloch.

Maire inghean Mhuireadhaich or Mary, daughter of Muireadhach II, Mormaer of Menteith, was Countess of Menteith, successor to her sister Isabella (Iosbail).

== Life ==
She inherited the title from her father, and married Walter Bailloch, son of Walter Stewart, 3rd High Steward of Scotland. By the time of the death of Walter Comyn, Lord of Badenoch, jure uxoris Earl of Menteith in 1258, she may have already been married. In 1260, Isabella was arrested, along with her new husband, an English knight called John Russell, for the poisoning of her late husband; by the month of April 1261, Walter and Mary were ruling the province as Count and Countess.

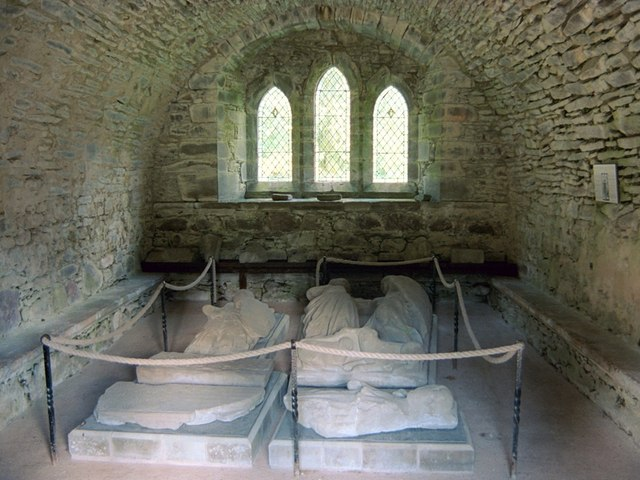
View of the Chapter House of Inchmahome Priory; effigies on the right represent the Countess Mary and Walter, Earl of Menteith.

The Countess Mary predeceased her husband, probably before 1286. Their tombstone is preserved in the Priory of Inchmahome, bearing the effigies of husband and wife, the former bearing on his shield the Stewart fess chequy with a label of five points, a device which also appears on his seal of arms in the Public Record Office, London.

They had two sons and one daughter:

- Alexander, Earl of Menteith, the next ruler of the province
- Sir John de Menteith, who captured Sir William Wallace and handed him over to the English
- Elena Stewart, who married Sir John Drummond (aft. 1240–1301), Thane of Lennox, Chief of Clan Drummond, son of Sir Malcolm de Drummond (aft. 1209–1278), Thane of Lennox, and paternal grandson of Sir Malcolm Beg de Drummond (aft. 1169–1259), Thane of Lennox, and wife Ada of Lennox, daughter of Maol Domhnaich, Earl of Lennox, and wife Elizabeth or Beatrix Stewart, and had issue:
  - Sir Malcolm Drummond (aft. 1270–1325), Thane of Lennox, who fought in the Battle of Dunbar in 1296, where he was captured by the English, and in 1301 was again captured by the English, and in the Battle of Bannockburn in 1314, married to ... de Graham, daughter of Sir Patrick de Graham of Kincardine and wife Annabella of Strathearn, and had issue
  - Gilbert Drummond, who was granted the lands and church of Kilpatrick, as Gilbert de Drumund of Dumbarton appears on the Ragman Rolls of 1296 swearing fealty to Edward I of England
  - Walter Drummond, Scottish Ambassador to England and Secretary to King Robert the Bruce
  - Christian Drummond, who received grants of lands in Ardcurane from Maol Choluim I, Earl of Lennox
  - Margaret Drummond, who received grants of lands in Ardcurane from Maol Choluim I, Earl of Lennox

== Bibliography ==
- Brown, Michael, The Wars of Scotland, 1214-1371, (Edinburgh, 2004)
- Paul, James Balfour, The Scots Peerage, Vol. VI, (Edinburgh, 1909)

| Preceded by Isabella | Countess of Menteith fl. 1261-x1295 | Succeeded by Alexander |
