= Patrick de Graham =

Scottish noble and soldier (c. 1235–1296)

Coat of arms of Sir Patrick de Graham, Lord of Kincardine, Argent, on a chief Sable, three escallops Or

Sir Patrick de Graham, Lord of Kincardine (c. 1235 – 27/28 April 1296), was a 13th-century Scottish noble and soldier.

== Biography ==
Patrick was born around 1235, the son of Sir David Graham of Dundaff and wife Agnes Noble. He was selected to negotiate the marriage of Prince Alexander of Scotland and Margaret of Flanders in 1281. He sat in the Parliament of 1284 and acknowledged Margaret, Maid of Norway as heir to the throne of Scotland.

He was Sheriff of Stirling by 1289 and was one of John Balliol's auditors in 1292 during the competition for the Scottish crown. Patrick swore fealty to King Edward I of England on 12 July 1292. On 1 September 1294 he was called to attend to and served Edward I in France in 1294. He died at the Battle of Dunbar in 1296, fighting on the Scottish side.

== Marriage and issue ==
Patrick married Annabella of Strathearn, widow of John of Restalrig and daughter of Robert, Earl of Strathearn, and wife Matilda, and had the following known issue:

- ... de Graham, married Sir Malcolm Drummond (aft. 1270–1325), Thane of Lennox, Chief of Clan Drummond, who fought in the Battle of Dunbar on 27 April 1296, where he was captured by the English, and in 1301 was again captured by the English, and in the Battle of Bannockburn in 1314, son of Sir John Drummond (aft. 1240–1301), Thane of Lennox, and wife Elena Stewart, daughter of Walter Stewart, Earl of Menteith, and wife Mary I, Countess of Menteith, and had issue:
  - Sir Malcolm Drummond (aft. 1295-Battle of Neville's Cross, Durham, 17 October 1346), Thane of Lennox, married and had issue:
    - Sir John Drummond of Stobhall (1318–1373), Thane of Lennox, Baillie of the Abthainy of Dull, who in February 1367 had a charter of his wife's lands, married to Mary de Montifex or Montfichet (1325-?), eldest daughter and co-heiress of Sir William de Montifex or Montfichet of Auchterarder, of Stobhall and of Cargill, Justiciar of Scotia before 1328, and had issue:
      - Annabella Drummond (c. 1350-October 1401)
      - Sir Malcolm Drummond (1351-bef. 8 November 1402, murdered while confined to prison by clansman (allegedly under Alexander Stewart) after some dispute), Earl of Mar, acquired Cargill, Stobhall, Kinloch and other lands from his aunt, Queen Margaret Drummond, Justiciar of Scotia before 1400, married in 1384 or bef. July 1388 Isabel Douglas, Countess of Mar, daughter of William Douglas, 1st Earl of Douglas, and wife Margaret, Countess of Mar, without issue
      - Margaret Drummond (1354-?), married bef. 1387 as his first wife Sir Colin Campbell of Lochawe, son of Sir Archibald Campbell of Lochawe and wife Mary or Isabella Lamont, without issue
      - Sir John Drummond of Cargill and Stobhall (Drymen, Stirlingshire, 1356–1428), Thane of Lennox, Justiciar of Scotia, married Elizabeth Sinclair (1363-?), daughter of Henry Sinclair, 1st Earl of Orkney, and wife Jean Haliburton, and had issue
      - Mary Drummond (1357-?)
      - William Drummond, 1st of Carnock (1358-?), married Elizabeth Airth, daughter of Sir William Airth of that Ilk and wife, and had issue, ancestor of the Drummonds of Carnock
      - Jean Drummond (1362-?)
    - Sir Maurice Drummond, 1st of Concraig (1322–1362), Hereditary Steward of Strathearn, resigned the Stewardship and Concraig to the 1st Lord Drummond, who renamed Conraig Drummond, married Ada of Lennox, daughter of Henry of Lennox, ancestors of the Drummonds of Concraig and Megginch, and had issue:
      - John Drummond, younger of Concraig
      - Maurice Drummond, 2nd of Concraig (?-1468), married Marion Erskine, daughter of Sir Robert Erskine of that Ilk and wife Beatrice de Lindsay, married and had issue
      - Malcolm Drummond, 1st of Colquhalzie
      - Walter Drummond of Dalchefick
    - Walter Drummond (1323-?)
    - Margaret Drummond (c. 1340-aft. 31 January 1375)
  - Gilbert Drummond, who fought and was killed in the Battle of Dupplin Moor on 11 August 1332
- Sir David de Graham of Kincardine and Old Montrose, married and had issue
- Sir John de Graham
- Margaret de Graham, married firstly Hugh, Earl of Ross, and secondly John de Berkeley of Gartley, and had issue
