= Battle of Dunbar =

Battle of Dunbar may refer to:

- Battle of Dunbar (1296), a battle in the Wars of Scottish Independence
- Battle of Dunbar (1650), a battle in the 1650 to 1652 Anglo-Scottish War
