= David de Graham of Kincardine =

Scottish noble (died 1327)

Coat of arms of Sir David de Graham of Kincardine, Argent, on a chief Sable, three escallops Or

Sir David de Graham of Kincardine (died 1327) was a 13th-14th century Scottish noble.

== Life ==
David was the son of Sir Patrick de Graham of Kincardine and wife Annabella of Strathearn. He fought with his father at the Battle of Dunbar on 27 April 1296, where he was captured and became a prisoner of King Edward I of England until 1297. His father Patrick died during the battle. David received several grants of land from King Robert I of Scotland, in consideration of his good and faithful services. He signed the Declaration of Arbroath in 1320. Robert I exchanged the Graham lands at Cardross for those of Old Montrose with David in March 1326. He died in 1327.

== Family and issue ==
David is known to have married and had the following issue:

- David de Graham of Kincardine and Old Montrose
- Patrick de Graham of Kinpunt
- Margaret de Graham
