= Robert Comyn =

Robert Comyn may refer to:

- Robert Comyn (died 1306), Scottish nobleman
- Robert Comyn (priest) (1672–1727), English priest
- Robert Buckley Comyn (1792–1853), British judge

== See also ==
- Robert de Comines (died 1069), Earl of Northumbria
