= Alexander Comyn (disambiguation) =

Alexander Comyn may refer to:

- Alexander Comyn, Earl of Buchan (died 1289)
- Alexander Comyn (died 1308)
- Alexander Comyn of Dunphail (died 1330)
