= Alexander Comyn of Dunphail =

13th-14th century Scottish noble

- Died: 1330
- Noble family: Comyn family
- Spouse: Eva
- Father: John Comyn, Lord of Badenoch
- Mother: Alicia de Ros

Alexander Comyn of Dunphail (died 1330) was a 13th-14th century Scottish nobleman. He was a son of John Comyn, Lord of Badenoch (died c.1275) and Alicia de Ros.

== Life ==
Alexander was married to Eva, widow of Alexander Murray, had issue.

He was captured at the battle of Dunbar in 1296, together with his brother Robert and nephew John and imprisoned.

He was killed during the siege of Dunphail Castle in 1330 by Thomas Randolph, Regent of Scotland.

He is known to have had an elder son Alister and five other sons who were also killed during the siege.
