= William Cumin (disambiguation) =

William Cumin was a 12th-century bishop of Durham.

William Cumin is also the name of:

- William Cumin (obstetrician) (died 1854), medical academic

== See also ==
- William Comyn (disambiguation)
