= Old Montrose =

Coordinates: 56.703889°N 2.536944°W

Old Montrose is an estate in Montrose, Angus, Scotland.

The lands and house of Old Montrose were given to David de Graham of Kincardine, in exchange for his lands of at Cardross to King Robert I of Scotland in 1326. A mansion house was built on the lands and was pulled down in the early part of the 19th century.
