= John Comyn IV of Badenoch =

Scottish nobleman (c. 1294–1314)

John Comyn IV, Lord of Badenoch (c. 1294 – 24 June 1314) was the son of John III "The Red" Comyn, former leader of Scottish rebels against the English, who was killed by Robert the Bruce in the Greyfriars church in Dumfries on 10 February 1306. He was sent to England after his father's death by his mother Jeanne de Valence.

John married Margaret Wake, daughter of John Wake, 1st Baron Wake of Liddell and Joan de Fiennes, and had one child, Aymer Comyn, who died in infancy in 1316.

John Comyn died fighting on the English side during the Battle of Bannockburn on 24 June 1314. He was killed in a cavalry charge against Scottish spearmen on the second and main day of battle.

Presumably he inherited the title of Lord of Badenoch when his father was killed, but it was forfeited at some point, possibly at Bruce's first Parliament in St Andrews in 1309.

Peerage of Scotland
Preceded by John Comyn III	Lord of Badenoch; 1306–?	Forfeit Title next held by Thomas Randolph
