= John de Seton (died 1299) =

Sir John de Seton was an English knight, whose sons fought on the side of Robert the Bruce, Earl of Carrick and later King of Scotland and were executed for treason.

== Life ==
Seton held the manor of Seton, in Yorkshire, and the manors and lands of Gamelsby, Unthank and Lambynby, and the lands of Seaton in Cumbria. King Edward I of England pardoned Robert Bruce, Lord of Annandale, and Seton for poaching in the King's forest at Inglewod. He performed fealty to Edward I at Berwick on 28 August 1296, for his Scottish lands. He died in 1299, an inquisition nominating his son Christopher as heir.

== Marriage and issue ==
John married Erminia, daughter of Thomas de Lascelles, Lord of Bolton, they had the following known issue:

- Christopher Seton (executed 1306), married Christina Bruce.
- John Seton (executed 1306)
- Humphrey Seton (executed 1306)
