= Christopher Seton =

Anglo-Scottish nobleman

Sir Christopher Seton
- Born: 1278; England
- Died: 1306 (aged 27–28); Dumfries, Scotland
- Spouse: Christina Bruce
- Parents: John de Seton; Erminia Lascelles

Sir Christopher Seton (1278–1306), also known as Christopher de Seton, was a 13th-century noble, who held lands in England and Scotland. He was a supporter of Robert the Bruce and obtained Robert's sister's hand in marriage. Present during the killing of John Comyn, Lord of Badenoch at Greyfriars Church, Dumfries, he also killed Sir Robert Comyn, who had rushed to Badenoch's aid. Seton was captured at Loch Doon Castle and executed at Dumfries in 1306.

== Life ==
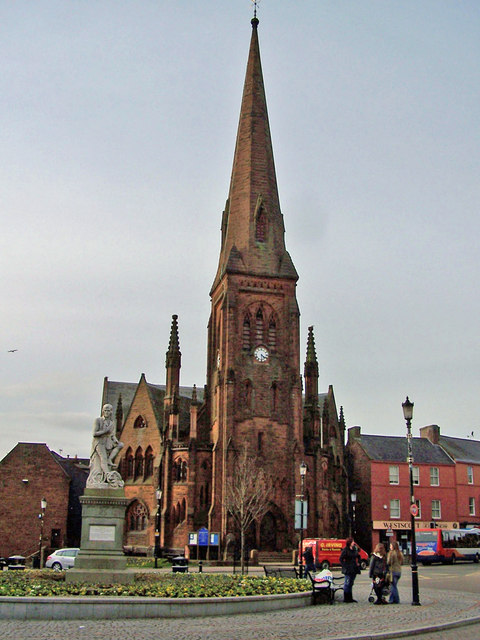
Greyfriars Church, Dumfries

Christopher Seton was the eldest son of Sir John de Seton of Skelton, Cumberland and Erminia Lascelles. His brothers were John and Humphrey de Seton. This branch of the Seton family had long served the Bruces in Yorkshire, Cumberland and Scotland. (While the Peerage identifies Alexander Seton, Governor of Berwick as his son, others claim him as his grandson.)

The inquisition post mortem for his late father’s estate was held in March of 1299, and at the time, Christopher’s age was given as twenty-one (so probably born in 1278). He did homage in October 1299 for the lands he had inherited upon the death of his father.

In 1301, at the age of twenty-three, Christopher married Robert de Brus's sister Christian or Christina Bruce.

Seton was present on 10 February 1306 when Sir John Comyn of Badenoch was stabbed by Robert de Brus in Greyfriars Church, Dumfries. As Sir Robert Comyn rushed to aid his nephew, Seton struck him down with a blow to the head. A letter of excommunication was issued naming the Earl of Carrick and three other knights, Sir Alexander Lindsay, Sir Christopher and his brother John Seton as John Comyn's murderers.

Seton was also present at the coronation of his brother in-law King Robert I, King of Scots, at Scone on 25–26 March 1306. Some accounts have him present at the Battle of Methven on 19 June 1306 but Duncan places him at Loch Doon Castle, an important castle for the Earls of Carrick and one of three that Robert tried to hang on to, but Loch Doon fell about 14 August.

Loch Doon Castle, Ayrshire, was besieged by the English and after the surrender of that castle by the Governor Sir Gilbert de Carrick, Christopher was hanged, drawn and quartered at Dumfries in accordance with Edward I's policy of giving no quarter to Scottish prisoners. His Cumberland estates, with the exception of his mother's dower, were given to Sir Robert de Clifford. A small chapel was raised by his wife Christina at Dumfries to the memory of her husband in 1326.

== Sources ==
- Fiona Watson, "Bruce, Christian (d. 1356)", Oxford Dictionary of National Biography, Oxford University Press, 2004.
- The Bruce by John Barbour: An Edition with translation and notes by A.A.M. Duncan, Canongate Classics, 1997, p. 150.
- Penman, Michael (2018). Robert the Bruce: King of the Scots. New Haven and London: Yale University Press. ISBN 9780300240313.
- Chisholm, Hugh, ed. (1911). "Dumfries" . Encyclopædia Britannica (11th ed.). Cambridge University Press.
- Chisholm, Hugh, ed. (1911). "Seton" . Encyclopædia Britannica (11th ed.). Cambridge University Press.
