= William Comyn of Kirkintilloch =

13th-century Scottish noble

- Died: 1291
- Noble family: Comyn family
- Spouse: Isabella Russell
- Father: John Comyn, Lord of Badenoch
- Mother: Alicia de Ros

William Comyn of Kirkintilloch (died 1291) was a 13th-century Scottish nobleman. He was a son of John Comyn, Lord of Badenoch (died c.1275) and possibly Alicia de Ros.

William was married to Isabella Russell, daughter of Isabella, Countess of Menteith and John Russell. Petitions were placed to King Edward I of England and King Alexander III of Scotland claiming the Earldom of Mentieth, in the right of Isabella, his wife and in 1285 half the lands of the Earldom of Mentieth were granted to William and Isabella. The title of the Earl of Mentieth was kept by Walter Bailloch, jure uxoris by his wife Mary, sister of Isabella, Countess of Menteith.

William was made Keeper of the Forest of Selkirk by Edward I of England in 1291. He died shortly afterwards, without issue by his own wife.

== Bibliography ==
- William Comyn, lord of Kirkintilloch @ People of Medieval Scotland, 1093–1314
- Fraser, W, ed. (1888). The Red Book of Menteith. Vol. 2. Edinburgh – via Internet Archive.
