= Culcreuch Castle =

Scottish castle

Coordinates: 56.06193°N 4.21904°W

- Fintry, Stirlingshire, Scotland; NS6193287675
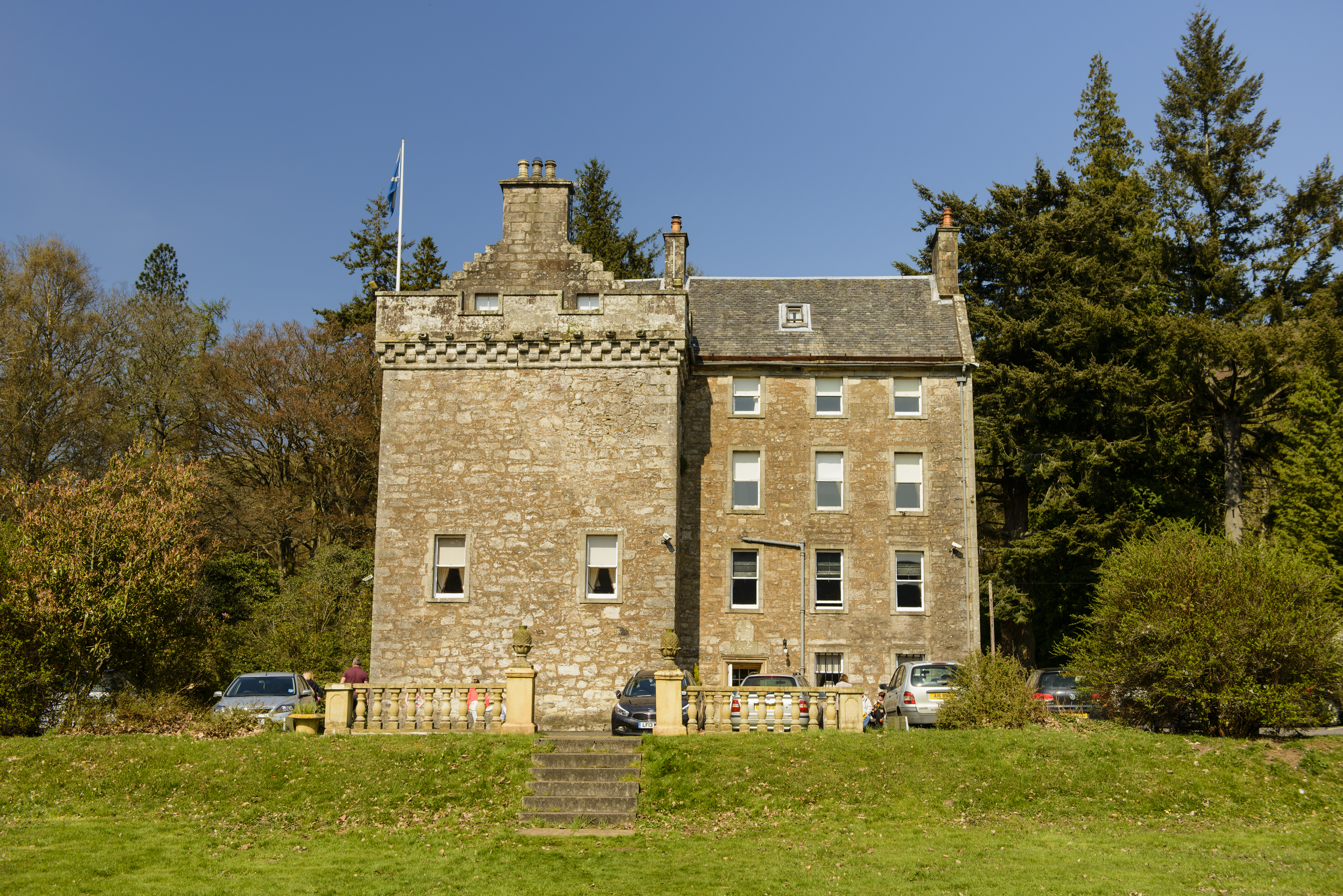

Site information
- Type: L-Plan tower house with a Jacobean range
- Owner: Hideaway Country Holidays Ltd.
- Open to the public: no

Site history
- Built: c. 1296
- Built by: Maurice Galbraith
- In use: 16th century to 21st century
- Materials: Stone

Garrison information
- Designations: Category A

Culcreuch Castle is a Scottish castle close to the village of Fintry, near Loch Lomond. It had been the home of the Barons of Culcreuch since 1699. In the 1980s the castle was converted into a hotel, which it was run as until early 2020 when it was closed to the public by the American owners thus ending over 700 years of history. It had been until January 2020 one of the longest continually inhabited Castles in Central Scotland.

== History ==
Culcreuch Castle was built in 1296 by Maurice Galbraith. It was the clan seat of Clan Galbraith from 1320 to 1624, when it was sold to a cousin, Alexander Seton of Gargunnock, to settle a financial debt. In 1632, it was purchased by Robert Napier, a younger son of John Napier, the 8th Laird of Merchiston. The Napier family held the estate for five generations. The castle was used to garrison Oliver Cromwell’s troops in 1654. In 1796, the castle was sold to Alexander Spiers of Glasgow, who built a cotton mill and a distillery in Fintry. It was sold in 1890 to J. C. Dunwaters, then again in 1901 to Walter Menzies. It passed into the hands of Hercules Robinson in the 1970s, the last of that line of the Menzies family. It was sold in 1984 to Arthur Haslam, who operated the castle as a hotel. In 2007, ownership was transferred to a holding company in Los Angeles, who took the decision to close the castle and business in 2020 ending over 700 years of continuous habitation.

== Design ==
Culcreuch is a rectangular tower house, with three stories and an attic, topped by a parapet and slate roof. The north and east extensions to the original tower were built after 1721 by the Napiers, and match the original tower.

=== Chinese Bird Room ===
Located within the 14th-century Culcreuch Castle in Fintry, Scotland, the Chinese Bird Room is a premier example of 18th-century Chinoiserie interior design. The room is famed for its hand-painted wallpaper, installed circa 1723, which depicts a vibrant, panoramic landscape of exotic birds, butterflies, and floral motifs. Representing the height of the Scottish Enlightenment's fascination with East Asian aesthetics, the chamber provides a delicate, artistic contrast to the castle’s rugged baronial architecture. It remains one of the oldest and best-preserved instances of imported Chinese paper in situ within the United Kingdom.
