= Inchgalbraith =

Islet in Scotland

Coordinates: 56°4′40″N 4°37′21″W

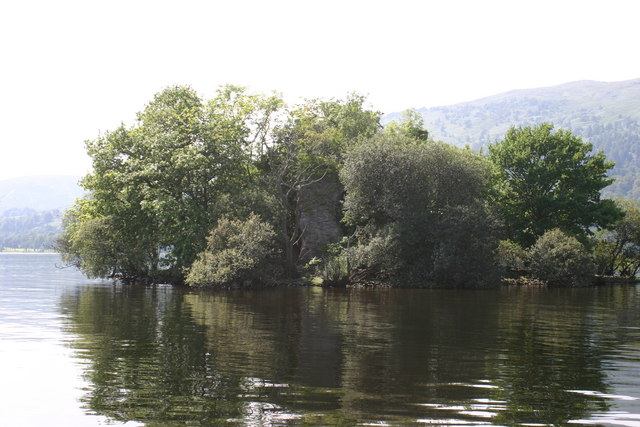

Location
- Inchgalbraith shown within Argyll and Bute

Administration
- Council area: Argyll and Bute
- Country: Scotland
- Sovereign state: United Kingdom

Inchgalbraith is an islet in Loch Lomond, Scotland, and is the ancestral home of Clan Galbraith.

== History ==
Inchgalbraith is, as its name implies, connected with Clan Galbraith, and was one of their strongholds. The remains of their ancient castle can still be seen. It is possibly a crannog. Restoration work was undertaken, probably in the late 19th century, with the use of gravelly concrete.

== Geography ==
It is on the west side of Loch Lomond, two miles (three kilometres) southeast of Luss. Its greatest elevation is 25 feet (8 metres). The most area on the island is covered by the castle and now with the collapsed stones from the castle itself.

== Wildlife ==
Inchgalbraith was a breeding place for ospreys until 1869.
