= Cumin (surname) =

Cumin is a surname.

As an Irish surname, it is anglicised from Irish Gaelic surname Ó Comáin.

Notable people with the surname include:

- Patrick Cumin (1695–1776), senior clergyman in the Church of Scotland
- William Cumin (?–c. 1159), Bishop of Durham and Lord Chancellor of Scotland
- William Cumin (obstetrician) (?–1854), Professor of Obstetrics and Gynaecology at the University of Glasgow

== See also ==
- Comyn (surname)
