= John Comyn of Ulceby =

14th-15th century English noble

Sir John Comyn of Ulceby (died c.1332), was an Anglo-Scottish noble. He was a younger son of John Comyn, Lord of Badenoch (died c.1275) and Alicia de Ros.

His elder brother John II Comyn, Lord of Badenoch granted him some lands in 1279, when he was still a minor.

His arms are described as: On a bend between 3 garbs (Comyn), 3 water bougets (Ros).

He was granted safe passage in 1302 and 1304 by King Edward I of England. He married Maud of unknown parentage. They had a son Robert and a daughter Isabel who married Thomas Clarrell.
