= William Comyn =

William Comyn may refer to:

- William Cumin, or Comyn, medieval bishop of Durham elect, and Lord Chancellor of Scotland
- William Comyn, Lord of Badenoch (1163–1233)
- William Comyns Beaumont (1873–1956), British journalist, author and lecturer
- William Leslie Comyn (1877–?), Californian businessman and shipbuilder
- William Comyn, Lord of Kilbride (died 1283), sheriff of Ayr in 1263

== See also ==
- William Cumin (disambiguation)
