= Menteith =

District of Perthshire, Scotland

Coordinates: 56.175°N 4.057°W

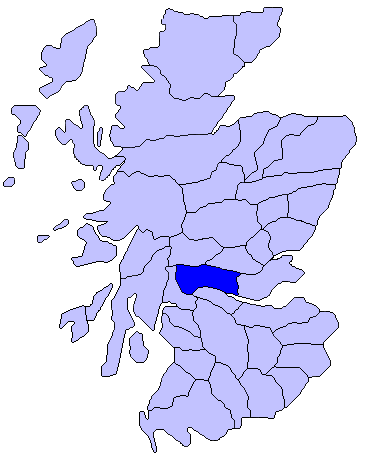
Map of Scotland showing roughly the historic district of Menteith (however, the eastern shore of Loch Lomond was actually part of The Lennox, rather than Menteith)

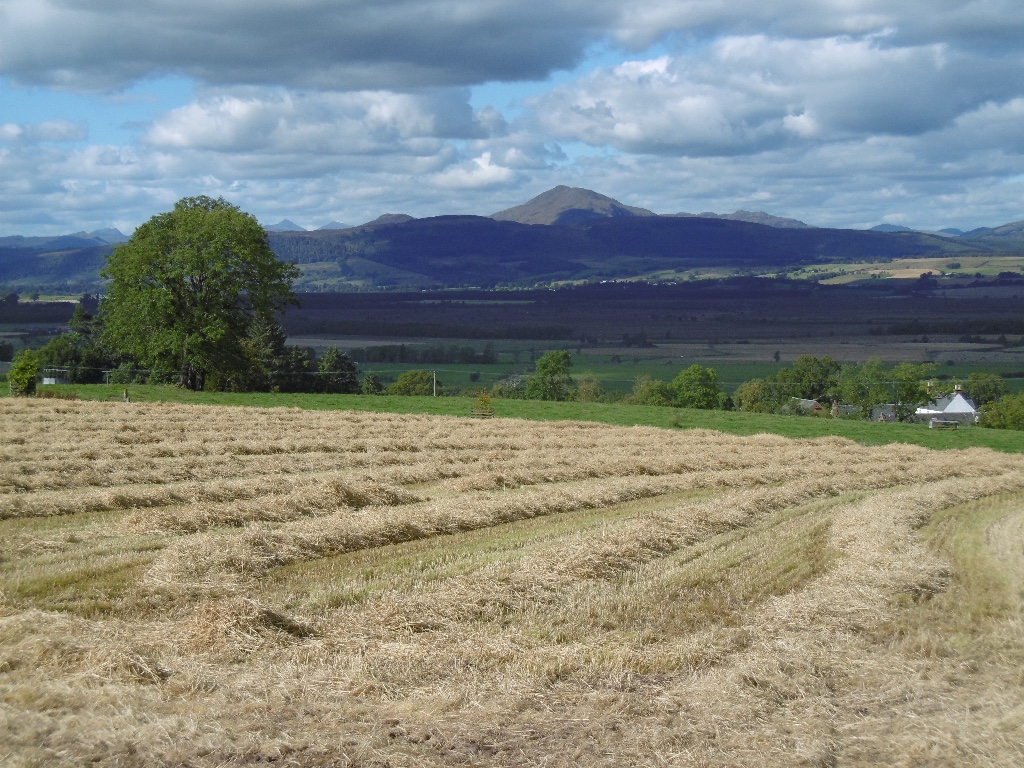
View over Menteith from Kippen on the south side of the Forth, centred on Ben Ledi

Menteith or Monteith (Scottish Gaelic: Tèadhaich) is a district of south Perthshire, Scotland, roughly comprises the territory between the Teith and the Forth. Historically, the area between Callander and Dunblane was known in English by the similar name of the "Vale of Menteith".

Menteith encompasses the parishes of Callander, Aberfoyle, Port of Menteith, Kippen, Kilmadock, Kincardine, Lecropt and Dunblane.

== Etymology ==
The name derives from a Brittonic cognate of Welsh mynydd, meaning "mountain" or "muir", and the obscure river name Teith.

== History ==
In medieval Scotland, Menteith was a stewartry, and later an earldom, ruled by the earls of Menteith. Gilchrist is the first known earl. In Shakespeare's Macbeth, Menteth (sic) is one of the "noblemen of Scotland" appearing in Act V who allies himself with Malcolm and others to oppose Macbeth's usurpation.

The lands and the earldom passed to Walter Comyn (d. 1258) in right of his wife Isabella; then, through Isabella's sister Mary, to the Stewarts; and finally to the Grahams. One notorious relative of the earls of Menteith was John de Menteith who betrayed William Wallace to the English. The earldom became extinct in 1694, but because sheriffdoms had previously been introduced into Scotland, sheriffs were a ready-made alternative source of authority: Menteith was covered by the sheriffdom based at Perth.

When local government reforms in the mid-19th century replaced the ancient provinces with new counties (shires) that were coextensive with the sheriffdom boundaries, Menteith became the south-western portion of the newly created county, Perthshire.

== Lake of Menteith ==
The Loch or Lake of Menteith, situated 2 1/2 mi (4.0 km) south of Loch Venachar, measures 1 1/2 mi (2.4 km) long by 1 mi (1.6 km) broad, and contains three islands. On Inchmahome (Innis MoCholmaig, island of St Colmaig) stand the ruins of Inchmahome Priory, an Augustinian priory founded in 1238 by Walter Comyn, and built in the Early English style, with an ornate western doorway. Mary, Queen of Scots, when a child of four, lived on the island for a few weeks in 1548 before leaving for Dumbarton Castle on her way to France. On Inch Talla stands the ruined tower, dating from 1428, that belonged to the estate of the earls of Menteith. The village of the Port of Menteith lies on the north shore of the loch.

== In literature ==
The landscapes, history and folklore of Menteith feature in a number of the sketches of the writer, politician and adventurer R.B. Cunninghame Graham, whose ancestral home was at Gartmore.
