= William Galbraith, 4th of that Ilk =

13th-century Scottish noble

Sir William Galbraith, 4th of that Ilk, Lord of Buthernock and Kincaid, was a Scottish noble. He was the eldest son of Arthur Galbraith.

William took part in the rescue of the boy king Alexander III from his father-in-law John Comyn I of Badenoch‘s control. William become one of the co-Regents of Scotland in 1255.

== Marriage and issue ==
He is known to have married a daughter of John Comyn I of Badenoch, they are known to have had the following issue:

- William Galbraith, married Willelma Douglas, had issue.
