= Robert Comyn (died 1306) =

13th-14th century Scottish noble

- Died: 10 February 1306; Greyfriars Church, Dumfries, Scotland
- Noble family: Comyn family
- Spouse: Margaret Comyn
- Father: John Comyn, Lord of Badenoch

Sir Robert Comyn (died 10 February 1306) was a 13th-14th century Scottish nobleman. He was a son of John Comyn, Lord of Badenoch (died c.1275).

Robert married Margaret Comyn, daughter of William Comyn of Lochaber, and is known to have a son Thomas.

He was captured at the Battle of Dunbar in 1296, together with his brother Alexander and nephew John and imprisoned.

On 10 February 1306, a meeting was held at the Greyfriars Church in Dumfries, between Robert the Bruce and John Comyn of Badenoch (Robert's nephew). An argument ensued between the two, with Robert the Bruce stabbing John Comyn.

Bruce's companions raced into the church and killed John Comyn with swords. Robert Comyn, rushing to aid his nephew, was killed by a blow to the head by Bruce's brother-in-law, Christopher Seton.
