= Greyfriars, Dumfries =

Friary in Dumfries and Galloway, Scotland

Coordinates: 55°04′13″N 3°36′24″W

- Interactive map of Greyfriars, Dumfries

Monastery information
- Other name: Dumfries Franciscan Friary
- Order: Order of Friars Minor
- Established: 13th century
- Disestablished: 1559
- Dedication: Mary Magdalene

People
- Founder: Lady Dervorguilla of Galloway

Site
- Location: Dumfries

Greyfriars, Dumfries, was a friary of the Friars Minor, commonly known as the Franciscans, established in Dumfries, Scotland. Following dissolution the friary was demolished and the site levelled. The locality has retained a reference to the friary in the street named "Friars Vennel". The present neo-Gothic Greyfriars was built from 1868 and is located at the site of the former Maxwell's Castle at the top of High Street.

The original friary is best known as where John "the Red" Comyn was killed by Robert the Bruce and his supporters, at the high altar in the chapel. The killing sparked the resumption of conflict with England with Bruce crowned King of Scots at Scone Palace seven weeks later. Bruce's campaign for an independent Scotland reached its culmination when the English recognised Scotland as an independent nation in the Treaty of Edinburgh–Northampton signed in 1328.
