= John Comyn I of Badenoch =

Lord of Badenoch in Scotland

- Coat of arms
- Died: c. 1275
- Noble family: Comyn family
- Spouses: Eva; Alice de Ros
- Issue Detail: John of Badenoch; William of Kirkintilloch; Alexander Comyn of Dunphail; Robert Comyn; John Comyn of Ulceby
- Father: Richard Comyn

John Comyn (Cumyn) (c. 1215 – c. 1275) was Lord of Badenoch in Scotland. He was Justiciar of Galloway in 1258. He held lands in Nithsdale (Dalswinton, a Comyn stronghold, and Duncow) and Tynedale.

== Life ==
The Comyn family were in effective power in Scotland from 1249 to 1255, when Alexander III of Scotland was a minor; John was one of those with court influence. The Comyns were ousted by Alan Durward, but returned to power in 1257-8, before provoking a strong English reaction.

He fought for Henry III of England at the Battle of Lewes (1265), with John Baliol the elder and Robert Bruce the elder, and was captured. In 1267 he was given licence to crenellate Tarset Castle in Tynedale (by present-day Lanehead, near Hexham), by Henry III; Tarset had previously been held by Walter Comyn.

He started the construction of Blair Castle with a tower built in 1269. The place was soon taken back by David, Earl of Atholl.

John was the son of a Richard Comyn and was the grandson (through Richard) of William Comyn, jure uxoris Earl of Buchan.

In 1275, John was one of the leaders of a Scottish expedition that crushed a Manx revolt against the Scottish Crown.

According to the 1911 Encyclopædia Britannica he died in 1274, and was nephew of Alexander Comyn, Earl of Buchan, Constable of Scotland, and of Walter Comyn, Earl of Mentieth. His date of death is also given as 1277.

He succeeded his uncle Walter, in 1258, as Lord of Badenoch, and was succeeded by his son John II, the "Black Comyn". John I was known as the "Red Comyn", the nickname more commonly applied to his grandson.

== Family ==
His first wife was called Eva, and appears to have been the mother of at least his oldest children.

His second wife was named Alice and referred to in one document after his death as Lady Alice de Roos (Ros). (Note: Scots Peerage has however suggested she might be a de Lindsay of Lamberton, because she and her husband possessed Ulesby, and also because John Comyn was once guardian to a related Lindsay.) Alice was the daughter of William de Roos of Helmsley and Lucy FitzPiers.

He is known to have had the following issue:

- John of Badenoch (died 1303), succeeded his father, married Eleanor de Balliol, daughter of John de Balliol and Dervorguilla of Galloway; had issue.
- William of Kirkintilloch (died 1291), married Isabella Russell, daughter of John Russell and Isabella, Countess of Menteith; without issue.
- Alexander Comyn of Dunphail (died 1330), married Eva, widow of Alexander Murray, had issue.
- Robert Comyn (died 1306), married Margaret Comyn, daughter of William Comyn of Lochaber; had issue.
- John Comyn of Ulceby; had issue.
- a daughter who married Alexander of Argyll; had issue.
- a daughter who married Sir William Galbraith, 4th of that Ilk; had issue.
- a daughter who married firstly Richard Siward and secondly Geoffrey de Mowbray; had issue.
- a daughter who married Sir Andrew Moray; had issue.

== Citations ==
Peerage of Scotland
Preceded by Walter Comyn	Lord of Badenoch; 1258–1277	Succeeded by John Comyn II
