= Greyfriars Church, Dumfries =

Church in Dumfries

Coordinates: 55.0704°N 3.6126°W

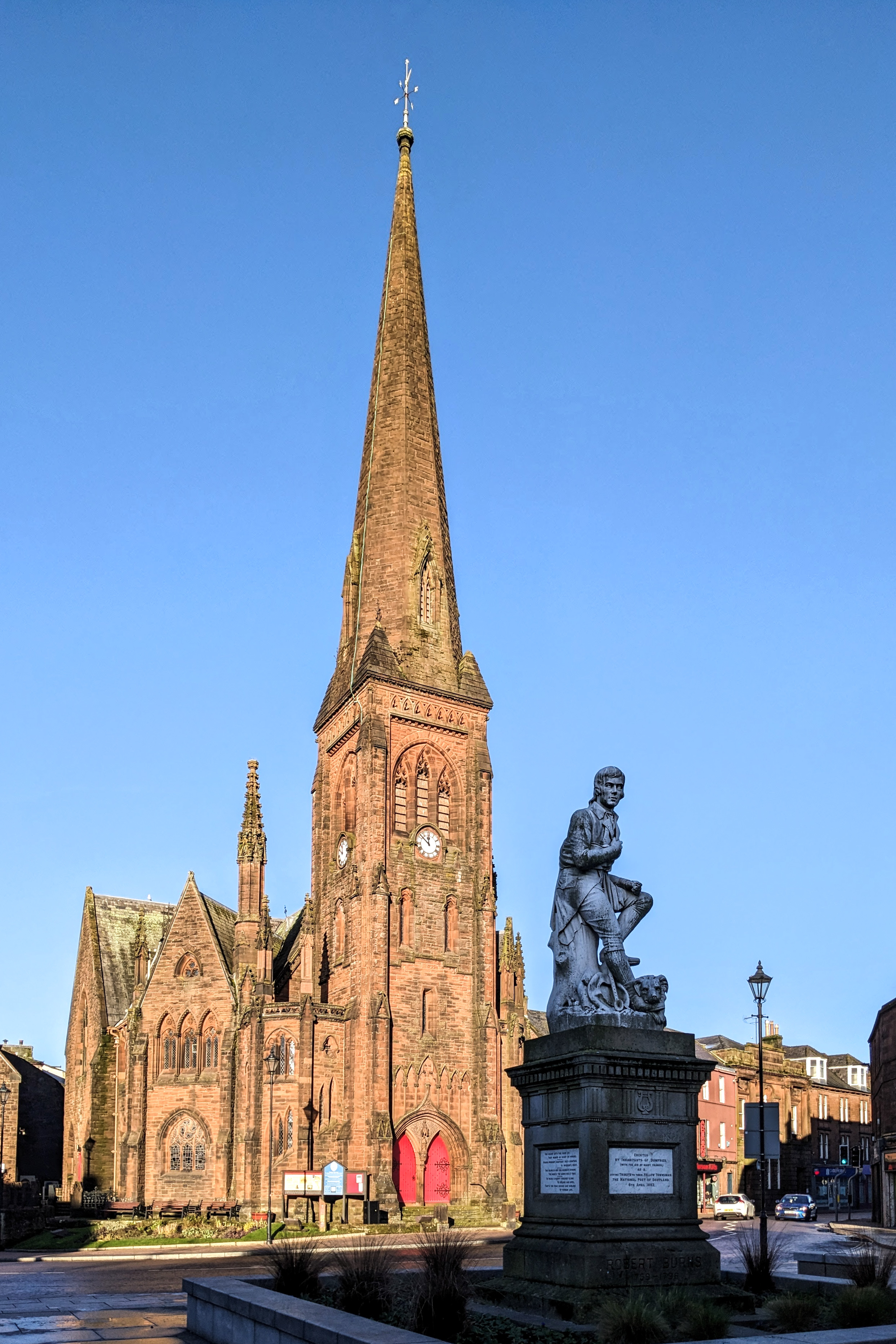
Greyfriars Church and Burns statue

Greyfriars Church, Dumfries, is a Category A listed building in Dumfries, in southwest Scotland. The current Greyfriars Church building was built from 1866 to 1868 in the Victorian Gothic style, designed by architect John Starforth. It is situated in a prominent position at the top of the High Street, and is constructed of local red sandstone taken from Locharbriggs Quarry. The building has an abundance of ornate decorative stonework, including impressive figures and foliage around the entrance doorway. These carvings are attributed to local stonemason and sculptor, William Flint.

Greyfriars Church was where Robert the Bruce and John Comyn had an initial battle, and Roger D Kirkpatrick delivered the fatal blow in 1306.

== History (buildings) ==
The location of building is on or near some of the earliest known buildings in that area of Dumfries:

- Greyfriars' Convent (nearby)
- Maxwell of Nithsdale Castle
- New Kirk
- Current Church Building

== Current Greyfriars Church building ==
The current Greyfriars’ Church was built from 1866 on the site of the New Kirk. The New Kirk was built in the 1720s on or adjoining the site of Maxwell of Nithsdale’s Castle. When the walls of the New Kirk were being demolished, several moulded and decorated stones were uncovered.

== Building the current church ==
Dumfries Town Council, Heritors of the New Kirk, considered over 30 plans for the proposed new church to be named Greyfriars’. The plans were exhibited for public view at the Market Hall on 10 May 1865. The final decision was between designs by the following architects:

- Mr James Barbour, Dumfries.
- Mr Edgar, London.
- Mr John Starforth, Edinburgh.

== Greyfriars Church today ==
Since 2008, Saint Bride’s Anglican Church has worshipped in the building. In June 2019 possible plans were announced which propose to reduce the size of the church and convert a portion of the building to residential flats. On 9 December 2021 St Bride's Anglican Church sold the church and moved to another site in Dumfries. Greyfriars was bought by the Orthodox Diocese of Whithorn.

== Images of stonework ==
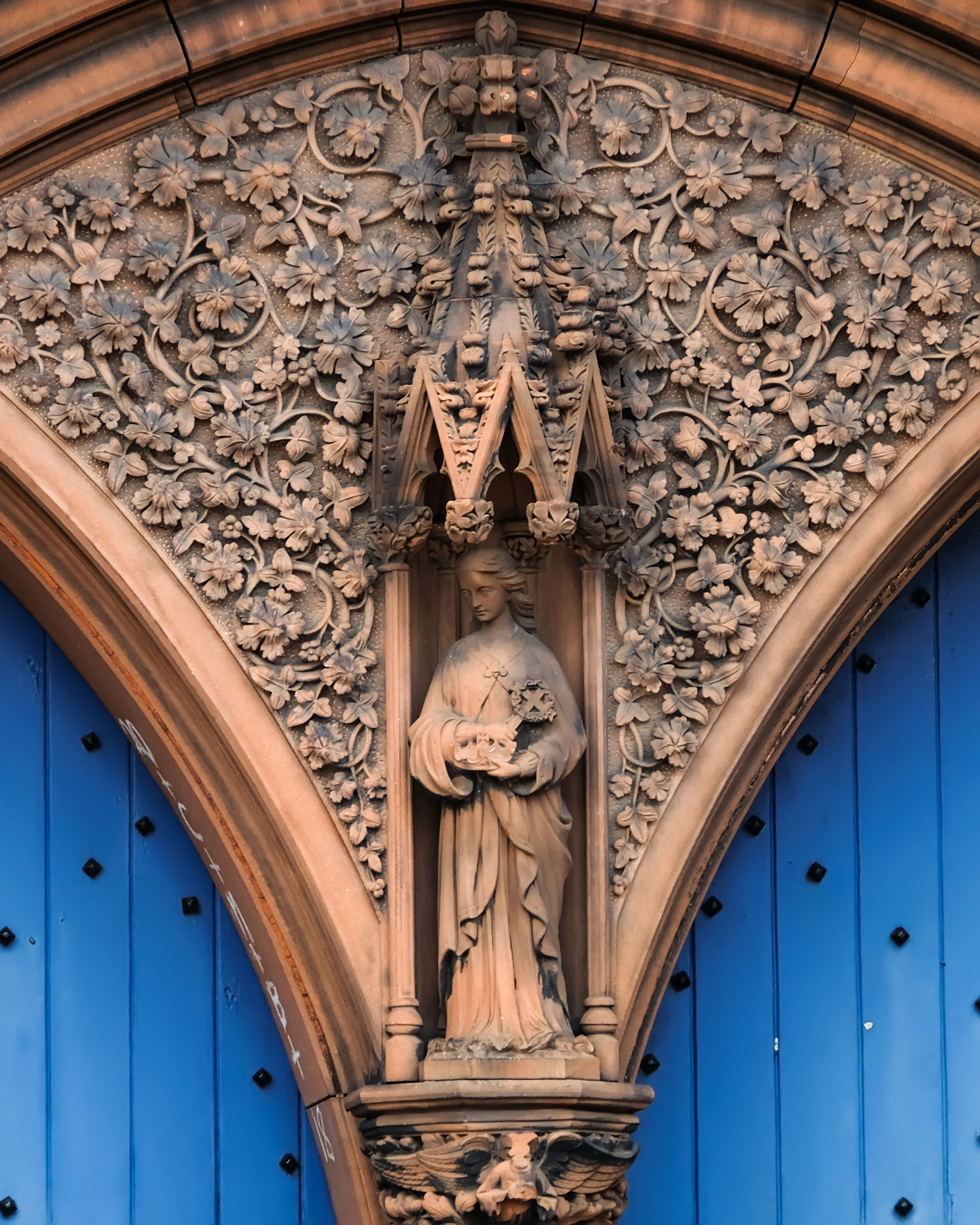
Ornate decorative stonework around front doors of Greyfriars Church, Dumfries

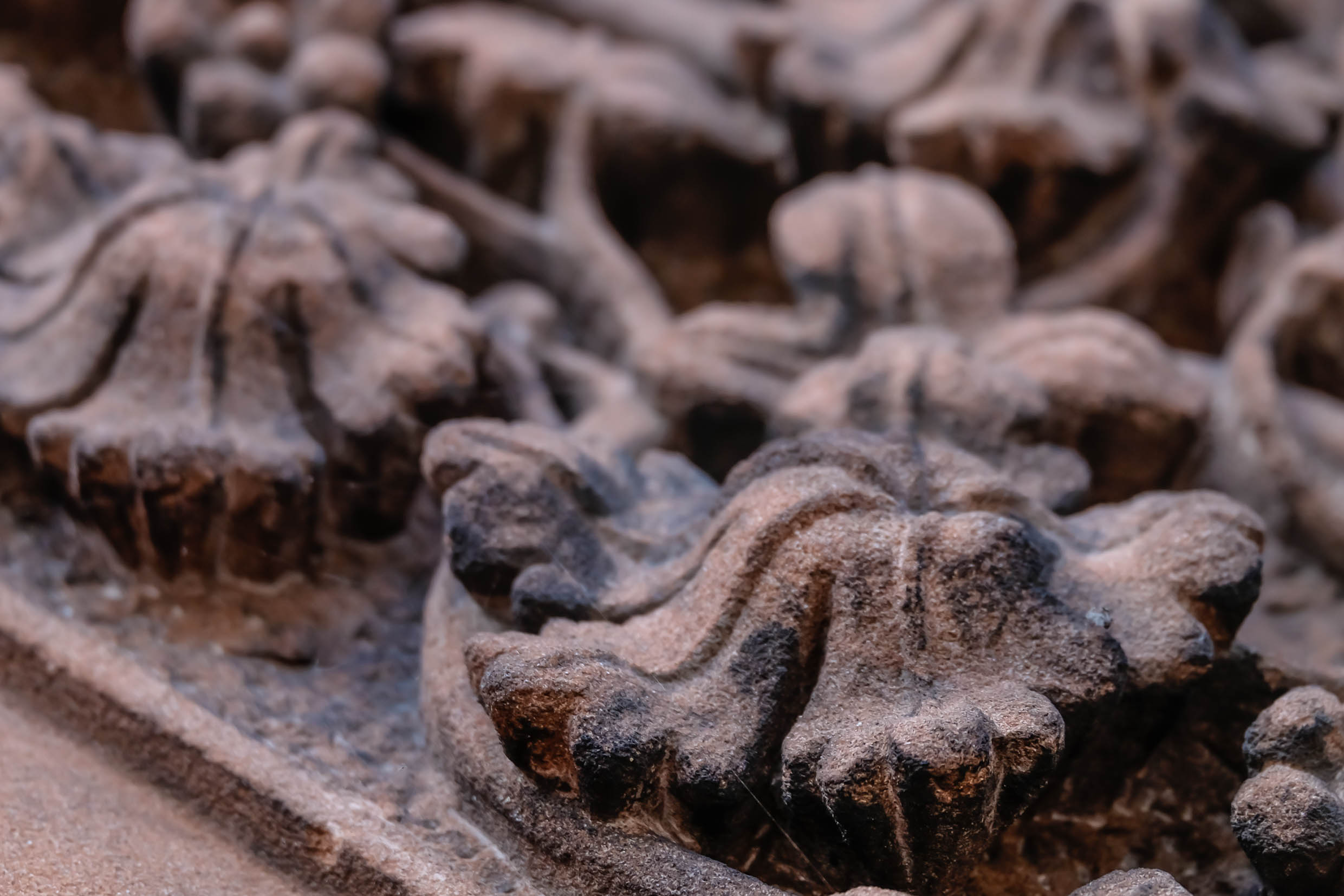
Detail of carved flowers

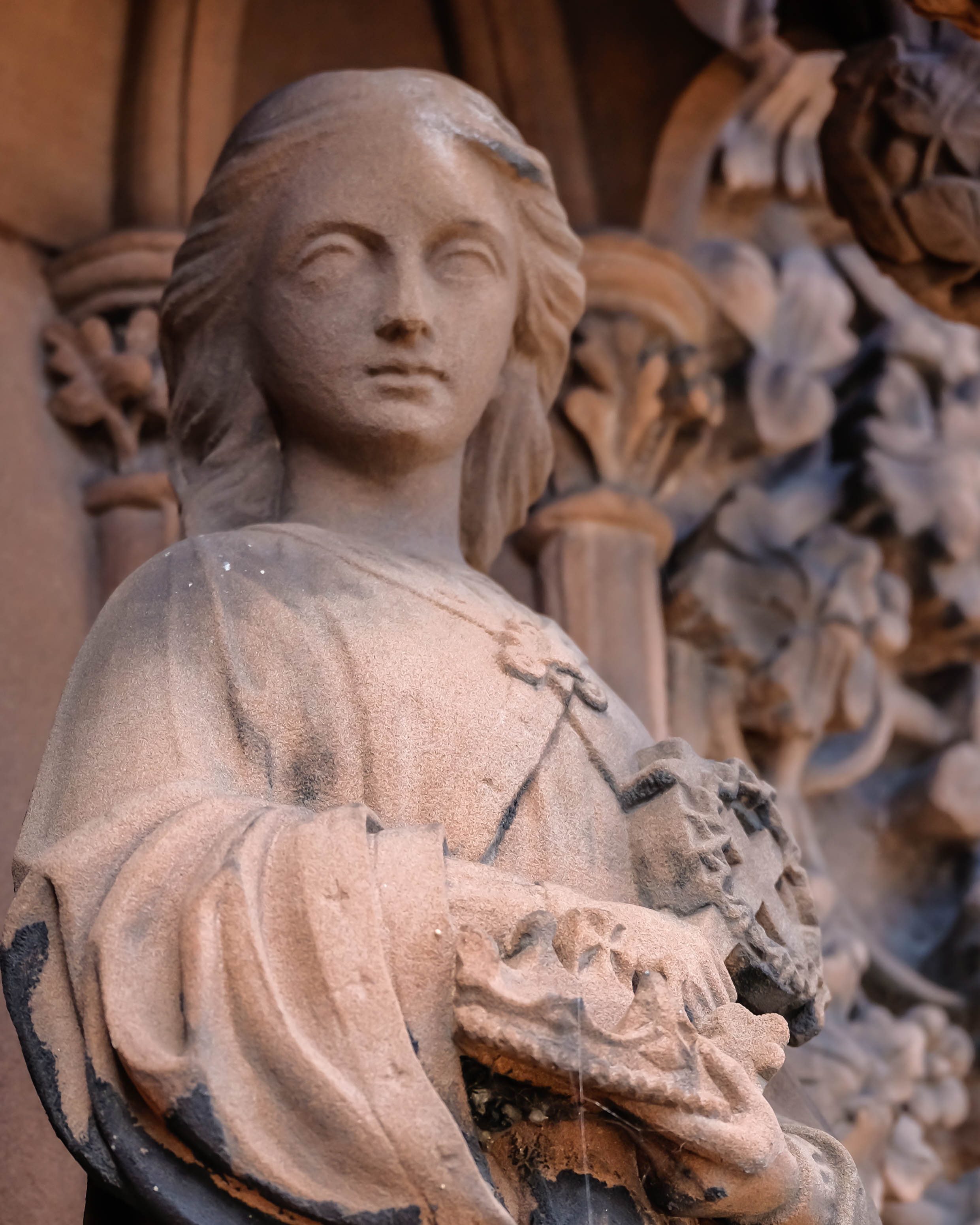
Carved female statue on Grayfriars Church, Dumfries

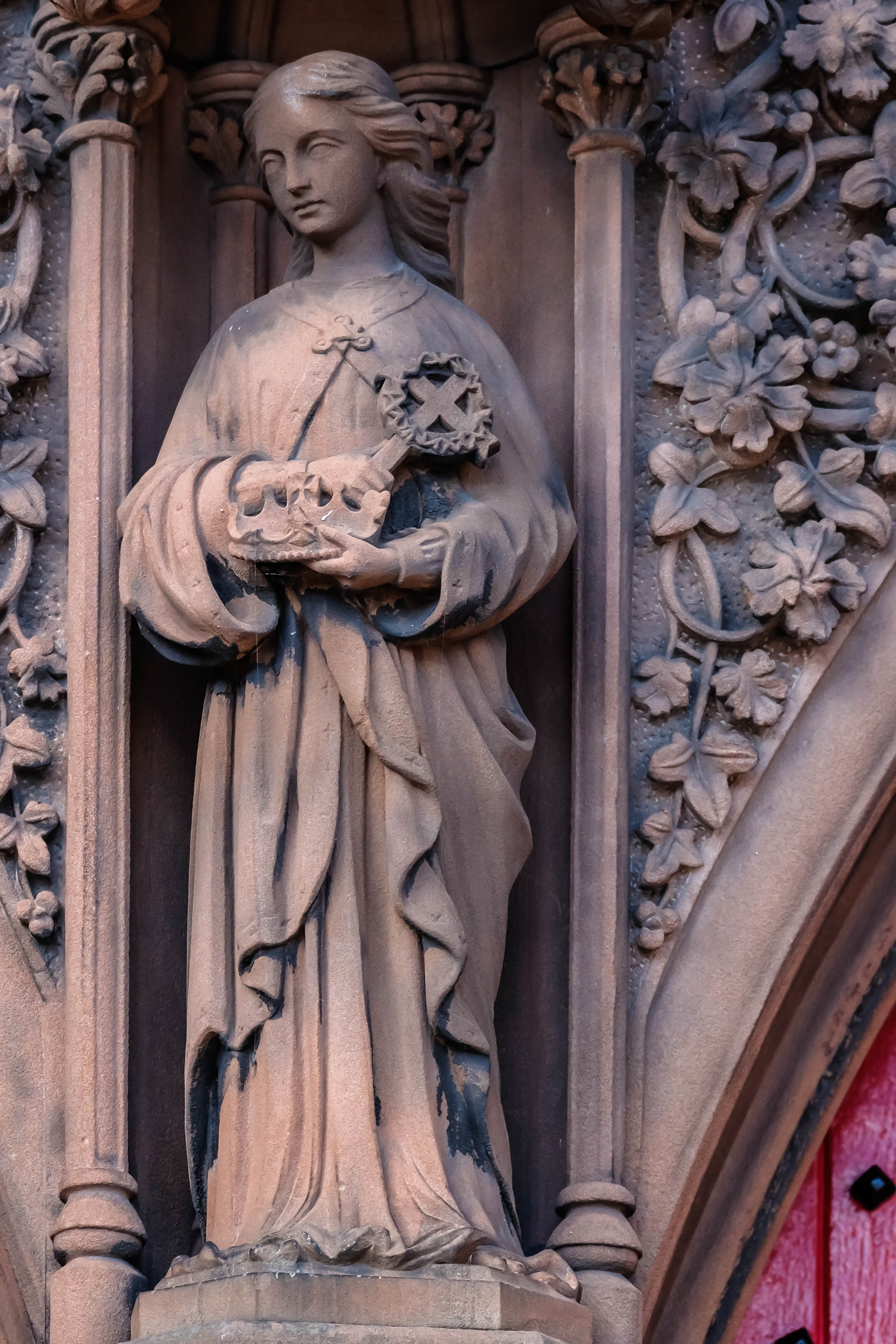
Carved statue on Grayfriars Church, Dumfries
