= Isabella, Countess of Menteith =

Scottish countess

Isabella, Countess of Menteith (1217 – 1272) was the eldest daughter of Muireadhach II, Mormaer of Menteith. When the old mormaer died without a legitimate male heir in 1233, the province passed to Isabella.

Isabella married Walter Comyn, Lord of Badenoch, bringing the mormaerdom temporarily into the hands of the Comyn family. When her husband died in 1258, Isabella married again, this time to an English knight named John Russell. This mediocre marriage left her too weak to protect her status. Already by 1259, Walter Stewart (nicknamed "Ballaich") was claiming the province for his wife, Isabella's sister Mary. By 1261, Isabella was arrested and deposed from rulership of the province on charges of poisoning her late husband.

Isabella may have had one son by Walter Comyn, a man named Henry who witnessed a charter of Maol Domhnaich, Mormaer of Lennox. However, if this Henry was their son, he did not live long enough to inherit from his parents.

== Bibliography ==
- Brown, Michael, The Wars of Scotland, 1214-1371, (Edinburgh, 2004)
- Paul, James Balfour, The Scots Peerage, Vol. VI, (Edinburgh, 1909)

Preceded by Muireadhach II	Countess of Menteith fl. 1233-1260x1261	Succeeded by Mary
