= Robert Comyn (priest) =

English priest

Robert Comyn (1672-1727) was an English priest in the first half of the 18th century.

Comyn was born in East Ilsley and educated at Balliol College, Oxford. He migrated to University of Cambridge in 1693. Comyn held livings at Wigmore, Brampton Bryan, Pontesbury and Presteign. He was Archdeacon of Shropshire from 1713 to 1726.
