= Walter Comyn, Lord of Badenoch =

Scottish noble (died 1258)

Walter Comyn, Lord of Badenoch (died 1258) was the son of William Comyn, Justiciar of Scotia and Mormaer or Earl of Buchan by right of his second wife.

== Life ==
Walter makes his first appearance in royal charters as early as 1211–1214. In 1220, he accompanied King Alexander II of Scotland during the latter's visit to York. He appears as "Lord of Badenoch" as early as 1229, after the defeat of the Meic Uilleim by his father.

Like his father, Walter married an heiress, Isabella, Countess of Menteith.

By 1234, Isabella had inherited the Mormaerdom of Menteith, so Walter became Mormaer or Earl of Menteith by right of his wife (jure uxoris). Walter appears to have had a son named Henry who witnessed a charter, dated to 1250, of Maol Domhnaich, Mormaer of Lennox. His daughter Isabel was given in marriage to Gilchrist Mure.

Walter was a leading political figure in the Kingdom of Scotland, especially during the minority of King Alexander III, when he, along with Alan Durward, essentially ruled the country. He died suddenly in either October or November 1258.

By this time, his son Henry must have died. Isabella remained countess until 1260–1261, when Walter Stewart, husband of Isabella's sister Mary, seized the province. As Walter had no surviving sons, the Lordship of Badenoch passed to his nephew John; however, he was unable to inherit Menteith.

He is remembered primarily in the proverbial expression Walter of Guiyock's curse, encountered in Sir Walter Scott's Rob Roy, under the English and Lowland form of his name, Walter Cuming, where it appears in chapter 29:

... and that they shuld dee the death of Walter Cuming of Guiyock, wha hadna as muckle o'him left thegither as would supper a messan-dog...

The origin of this is related in Sir Walter Scott's note at that page:

A great feudal oppressor, who, riding on some cruel purpose through the forest of Guiyock, was thrown from his horse, and his foot being caught in the stirrup, was dragged along by the frightened animal till he was torn to pieces. The expression, “Walter of Guiyock’s curse,” is proverbial.

An accident such as this was supposed to be a curse akin to that dealt upon Walter Cuming for his sins; thus the expression originated.

== Notes ==
Peerage of Scotland
Preceded by New Creation; See Meic Uilleim	Lord of Badenoch; 1229–1258	Succeeded by John I
