= Lord of Badenoch =

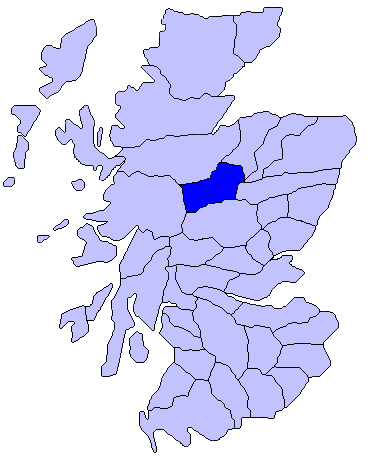
Former extent of the lands of Badenoch (in blue)

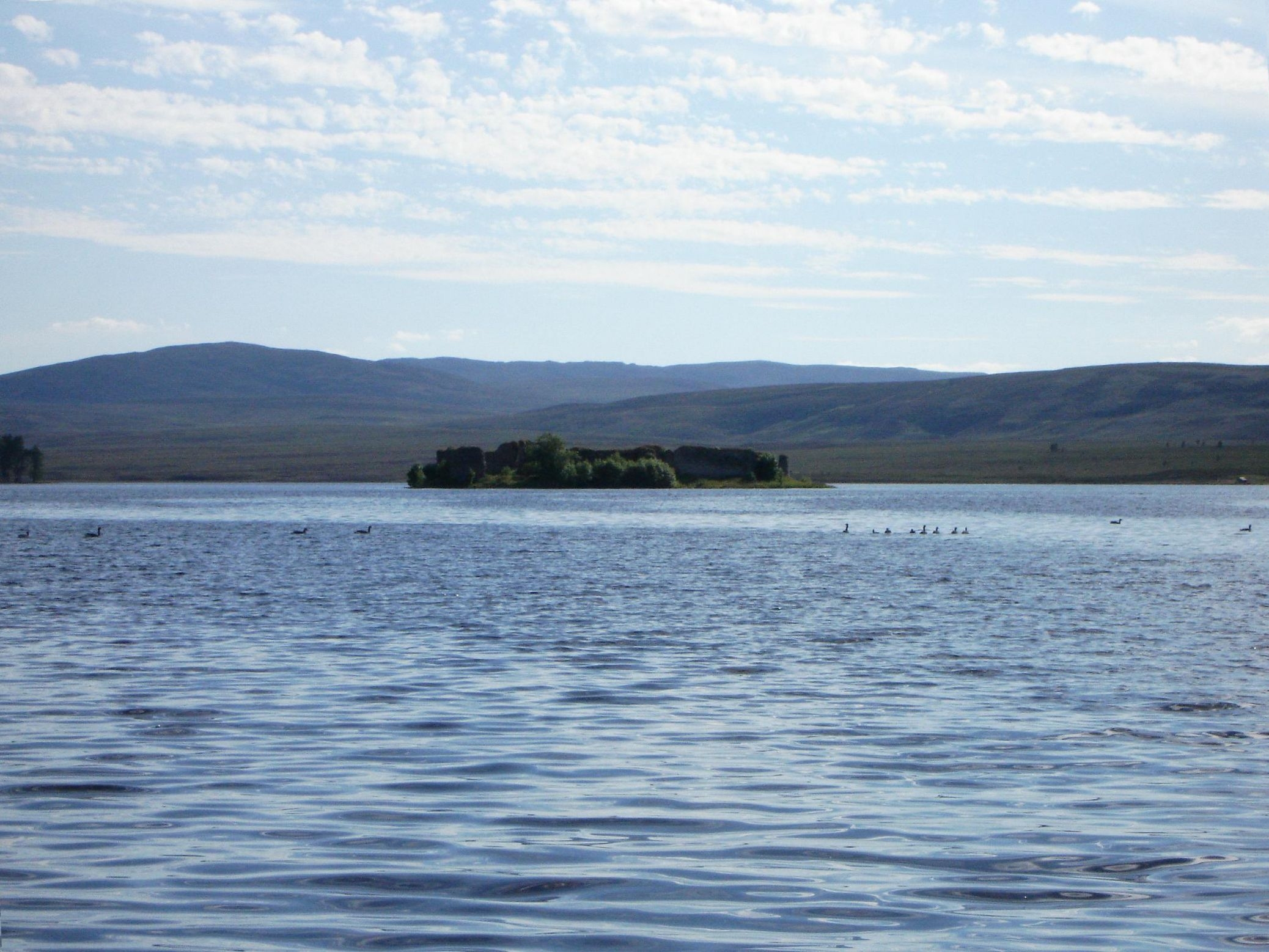
Lochindorb Castle at Lochindorb in Badenoch, one of the most important strongholds of the lordship.

The Lord of Badenoch was a magnate who ruled the lordship of Badenoch in the 13th century and early 14th century. The lordship may have been created out of the territory of the Meic Uilleim, after William Comyn, jure uxoris Earl of Buchan, Justiciar of Scotia and Warden of Moray defeated Gille Escoib MacUilleim. However, there is no evidence that the Meic Uilleim held lands in this area. After the death of John III in 1306, the lordship was taken into royal hands, although it was still claimed by his son John. The Lordship was included in the vast Earldom of Moray when it was resurrected for Thomas Randolph.

The following figures were Lords of Badenoch:

- Walter Comyn, Lord of Badenoch, jure uxoris Earl of Menteith (d.s.p. 1258)
- John Comyn I (d. 1277)
- John Comyn II (d. 1302)
- John Comyn III (d. 1306)
- Forfeit; included in the Earldom of Moray recreated for Thomas Randolph, 1st Earl of Moray in 1312
- After death of John Randolph, 3rd Earl of Moray in 1346, earldom of Moray passed into crown hands.
- Lordship given to Alexander Stewart, Earl of Buchan ("Wolf of Badenoch") (d. 1394)
- Alexander Stewart, Earl of Mar (d. 1435)
- Lordship granted by King James II to Alexander Gordon, 1st Earl of Huntly; for his successors, see Marquess of Huntly

== See also ==
- Clan Chattan
- Clan Comyn
