= John Comyn III of Badenoch =

Scottish noble (c. 1274–1306)

John Comyn Lord of Badenoch
- Born: c. 1274
- Died: 10 February 1306; Greyfriars, Dumfries, Scotland
- Cause of death: Stabbing
- Other name: Red Comyn
- Years active: 1296–1306
- Office: Guardian of Scotland
- Spouse: Joan de Valence
- Children: John Comyn IV; Elizabeth, Baroness Talbot; Joan, Countess of Atholl
- Parent(s): John Comyn II; Eleanor Balliol
- Relatives: King John Balliol (uncle); John Comyn, Earl of Buchan (cousin)
- Family: Clan Comyn of Badenoch

Guardian of Scotland
- In office 1298–1304 Serving with: Robert Bruce (1298–1300); William Lamberton (1299–1301); Ingram de Umfraville (1300–1301); John de Soules (1301–1302)
- Preceded by: William Wallace
- Succeeded by: John of Brittany (appointed by Edward I of England)

Military service
- Battles/wars: Scottish Independence War • Battle of Dunbar (1296) • Battle of Roslin (1303); Edward I's Flemish campaign

John Comyn III of Badenoch, nicknamed the Red (c. 1274 – 10 February 1306), was a leading Scottish baron and magnate who played an important role in the First War of Scottish Independence. He served as Guardian of Scotland after the forced abdication of his uncle, King John Balliol (r. 1292–1296), in 1296, and for a time commanded the defence of Scotland against English attacks. Comyn was stabbed to death by Robert the Bruce before the altar at the church of the Greyfriars at Dumfries.

His father, John Comyn II, known as the Black Comyn, had been one of the competitors for the Crown of Scotland, claiming his descent from King Donald III. His mother was Eleanor Balliol, sister of King John Balliol. He had, moreover, links with the royal house of England: in the early 1290s, he married Joan de Valence, cousin of King Edward I.

== Comyn family ==
On the eve of the Wars of Independence, the Comyns were one of the dominant families of Scotland, with extensive landholdings in both the north and south of the country, and political influence and family connections with the crown. This Anglo-Norman family first made an appearance in Scotland during the reign of David I. In the thirteenth century they acquired the lordship of Badenoch, with extensive landholdings also in Lochaber, as well as the earldom of Buchan. On the death of Alexander III, John Comyn's father was appointed to the panel of Guardians to await the arrival of the infant Margaret, Maid of Norway, granddaughter of Alexander III. Her death in 1290 immersed the nation in crisis, finally solved in 1292 when John Balliol emerged as king, with the support of his Comyn kinsmen, a solution that was never accepted by the other main claimant, Robert Bruce of Annandale, grandfather of the future king. The Comyns were supporters of King John as was William Wallace.

== Comyn at war ==
With the outbreak of war between England and Scotland, Comyn, his father, and his cousin, John Comyn, Earl of Buchan, crossed the border and attacked Carlisle, defended for King Edward by Robert Bruce, Earl of Carrick, the father of the future king. The Wars of Scottish Independence thus began in a clash between the Bruces and Comyns. Having no siege equipment, the Comyns drew off and subsequently joined the main Scottish host at Haddington, which had been assembled to meet the advance of the English army along the east coast. On 27 April, the Scots were overwhelmed at the Battle of Dunbar, with John being among the many prisoners taken. While his father and cousin retreated north in the company of King John, he was sent south, to be imprisoned in the Tower of London.

John remained in prison for some months; but with the war in Scotland seemingly over he was finally released on condition that he take up service with Edward in Flanders, the main theatre of operations in his war against the French. While there he learned of the rising of William Wallace and Andrew Moray and their victory over the English at the Battle of Stirling Bridge. In March 1298, John was among Scots who deserted the English, finally ending up in Paris, where they appealed for aid to Philip IV of France. The only help they managed to get was a ship back to Scotland, arriving before the summer.

== Battle of Falkirk ==
Earlier that year William Wallace emerged as Guardian after Moray died at Stirling or shortly after. The main task facing the Guardian was to gather a national army to meet an invasion by Edward, anxious to reverse the victory of Stirling Bridge. For cavalry, by far the weakest element of the Scottish host, Wallace depended on the Comyns and the other noble families. On 22 July Wallace's army was destroyed at the Battle of Falkirk, the light horse being driven off at an early stage by the heavy English cavalry.

It is possible that John Comyn was present at the battle, though the evidence is far from conclusive. The main Scottish sources, the chronicles of John Fordun and John Barbour, were composed decades after the event, long after the Comyns had been expelled from Scotland, and had a specific agenda, namely to magnify the later King, Robert the Bruce, and diminish John Comyn. According to Fordun, John and his kin hated Wallace and appeared on the battlefield only with premeditated treachery in mind – "For, on account of the ill-will, begotten of the sprig of envy, which the Comyns had conceived towards the aforesaid William, they, with their accomplices, forsook the field, and escaped unhurt." This is set alongside a commendation of Robert the Bruce, who, in Fordun's account, fought on the side of the English and "was the means of bringing about the victory." This is contested as no Bruce appears on the Falkirk roll of nobles present in the English army, and ignoring Blind Harry's 15th claim that Wallace burned Ayr Castle in 1297, two 19th-century antiquarians, Alexander Murison and George Chalmers, stated that Bruce did not participate in the battle and the following month decided to burn Ayr Castle to prevent it being garrisoned by the English. The contemporary English record of the Lanercost Chronicle simply blames the inadequacy of the Scottish cavalry in general. Soon after the defeat, John Comyn and Robert the Bruce were named as joint Guardians of the Realm in place of Wallace.

== Guardian of Scotland ==
With no independent power base, Wallace, whose prestige had always been based on the success of his army, resigned or was removed as Guardian after Falkirk. In his place an unusual and difficult balancing act: John Comyn and Robert the Bruce, who had now joined the patriot party. The Scots were still fighting on behalf of the absent King John, so Bruce must have paid lip service to the cause, though his royal ambitions were openly known. The records give little or nothing in the way of insight into the feelings and motives of these men. At a meeting of a council of the magnates at Peebles in August 1299, an argument broke out relative to the property of Wallace, who was then in France. Comyn is said to have seized Bruce by the throat.

William Lamberton, Bishop of St. Andrews, was appointed as a third Guardian. Lamberton was a personal friend of both Wallace and Bruce. Bruce resigned before May 1300, when the restoration of King John was looking increasingly likely, leaving only Comyn and Lamberton. When parliament assembled at Rutherglen it elected Sir Ingram d'Umphraville to be one of the guardians of the realm in place of Bruce.

This was obviously an arrangement that suited Comyn, because Umphraville was a close political associate and a kinsman of King John. With the Guardianship taking Scotland one way, Robert Bruce went the other, making his peace with Edward by February 1302 in a document in which he expressed the fear that "the realm of Scotland might be removed from the hands of the king, which God forbid, and delivered to John Balliol, or to his son."

The new triumvirate lasted to May 1301, when John de Soules emerged as senior Guardian, seemingly appointed by Balliol himself pending his return. The following year, with Soules leaving for France on a diplomatic mission, Comyn (who may have resigned the guardianship during Soules's tenure in 1301–2) became sole Guardian, occupying the position for the next two years. Comyn became Lord of Badenoch following his father's death that same year.

== Defiance and surrender ==
There was a certain inevitability to the Comyn domination of Scottish government in the years before 1304: they were the most powerful of the noble families, having more military resources and more control, particularly in the north, than any other family. English invasions in 1298, 1300, and 1301 had been confined to the south of the country, leaving the north as the chief recruiting ground, and supply base, of the Scottish army. The Guardian's prestige increased still further when he and Sir Simon Fraser defeated an English reconnaissance force at the Battle of Roslin in February 1303.

Politically, however, the outlook was bleak. Philip of France entered into a final peace with Edward, from which Scotland was excluded. John Balliol, whose star had risen briefly above the horizon, now sank into the twilight of history. In a mood of desperation, the Scottish diplomats in Paris, who included Comyn's cousin Buchan, wrote words of encouragement; "For God's sake do not despair...it would gladden your hearts if you would know how much your honour has increased in every part of the world as a result of your recent battle with the English." However, for the first time since 1296, Edward was preparing an offensive that would take him deep into the north of Scotland. Unable to mount an effective resistance, and with his main base threatened with destruction, Comyn entered into peace negotiations, which concluded at Strathord near Perth on 9 February 1304.

Echoing the Treaty of Birgham, it was stipulated that laws, usages, and customs in place in the time of Alexander III should be retained. Comyn insisted that there should be no reprisals or disinheritance, which Edward accepted, with notable exceptions. Edward maintained his particular hatred for one former Guardian. Comyn was thus obliged to adhere to a condition in which he and other named individuals were to "capture Sir William Wallace and hand him over to the king, who will watch to see how each of them conducts himself so that he can do most favour to whoever shall capture Wallace..." There is no evidence to suggest Comyn made any effort to fulfil this condition.

== Death in Dumfries ==
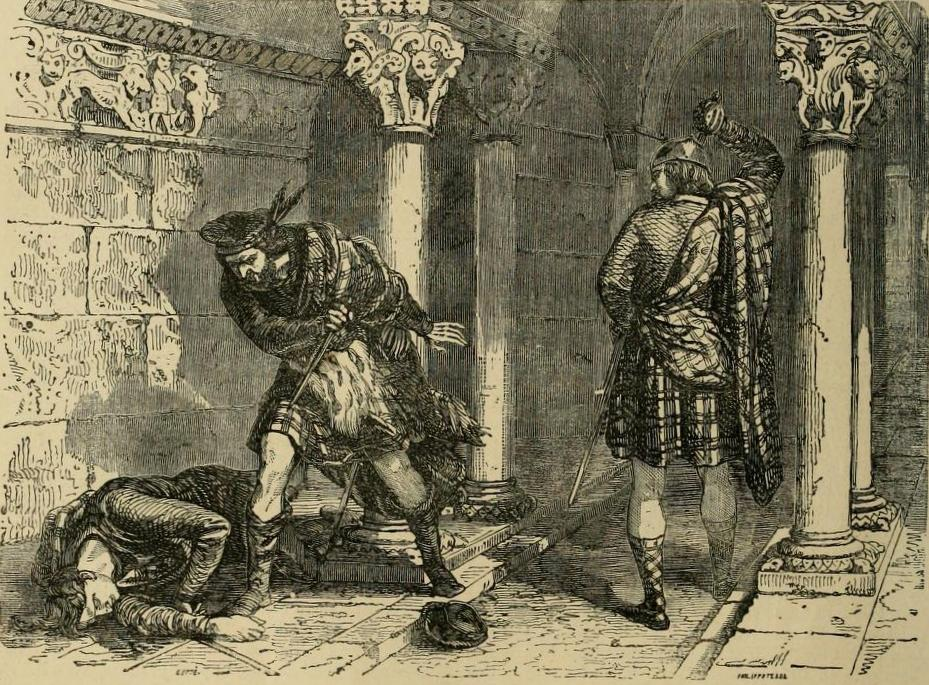
The killing of Comyn in the Greyfriars church in Dumfries, as portrayed by Felix Philippoteaux, a 19th-century illustrator.

On 10 February 1306, Robert the Bruce participated in the killing of John Comyn before the high altar of the Greyfriars Church in Dumfries. Legend, possibly apocryphal, says Robert the Bruce called Comyn to a meeting. After Sir Richard Edgar encouraged Robert to slay the Red Comyn, saying: "Maun dae it," Robert stabbed him and rushed out to tell Roger de Kirkpatrick. Kirkpatrick went in to finish the job uttering: "You doubt! I mak siccar!" ("I make sure!") while Sir Robert Fleming decapitated Comyn, presenting the head to Robert, stating: "Let the deed shaw" ("Let the deed show").

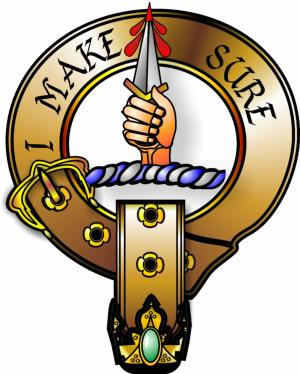
"I mak siccar!" on the crest of Clan Kirkpatrick

"Let the Deed Shaw" on the crest of Clan Fleming

Apart from these bare facts, nothing certain can be gathered from contemporary accounts. While later Scottish sources all try to justify the crime by amplifying earlier accusations of malevolence and treachery against Comyn, the English sources portray Robert as a villain who lured Comyn inside a church – taken as a guarantee of safety – to commit a premeditated and sacrilegious murder before the Real Presence.

Some sources state that Bruce and Comyn had previously signed a pact, whereby one would take the crown in return for the lands of the other. As they stood before the high altar, Bruce accused Comyn of having betrayed him by planning to hand him over to the English and he struck Comyn with a dagger. It is unknown if this account is true.

Bruce's companions struck him with their swords. Sir Robert Comyn, rushing to aid his nephew, was killed by a blow to the head by Bruce's brother-in-law, Christopher Seton.

Thirteen days after the event, a garbled version of the facts reached the court of Edward I at Winchester, where the murder was reported as "the work of some people who are doing their utmost to trouble the peace and quiet of the realm of Scotland." Once the picture became clear, Edward reacted in fury, authorising Aymer de Valence, Comyn's brother-in-law, to take extraordinary action against Bruce and his adherents by granting no quarter to them. King Edward also emphasised his blood relationship with the Comyns by ordering his cousin, Joan, to send John's young son and namesake to England, where he was placed in the care of Sir John Weston, guardian of the royal children. John IV Comyn grew to manhood in England, not returning to Scotland until 1314, when he was killed at the Battle of Bannockburn. The assassination of his father plunged Scotland into a brief but bloody civil war, largely concluded by 1308, but with political reverberations that were to last for decades.

Political offices
| Preceded by William Wallace | Guardian of Scotland; 1298–1304; With: Robert Bruce (1298–1300); William Lamberton (1299–1301); Ingram de Umfraville (1300–1); John de Soules (1301–1302) | Succeeded by John of Brittany |
Peerage of Scotland
| Preceded by John Comyn II | Lord of Badenoch; 1302–1306 | Succeeded by John Comyn IV |
| Preceded by Robert de Brus VI (confiscated) | Lord of Annandale; 1295–1296 | Succeeded by Robert de Brus VI (restored) |
