= John Comyn II of Badenoch =

Scottish baron and claimant to the throne

- Died: 1302
- Noble family: Comyn family
- Spouse: Eleanor de Balliol
- Issue: John Comyn III of Badenoch
- Father: John I Comyn, Lord of Badenoch

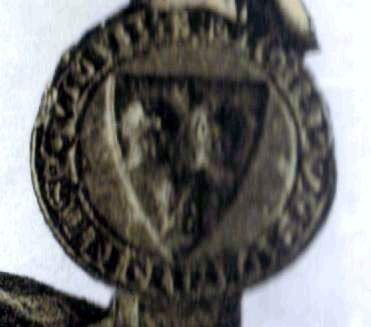
Seal of John Comyn, attached to a charter (1278) which granted use of a road through his forest to Inchaffray Abbey.

John Comyn II of Badenoch, Lord of Badenoch (died 1302), nicknamed the Black Comyn, was a Scottish nobleman, a Guardian of Scotland, and one of the six Regents for Margaret, Maid of Norway. His father was John Comyn I of Badenoch.

== Competitor for the Crown ==
In 1284 he joined with other Scottish noblemen who acknowledged Margaret of Norway as the heir of King Alexander III. He was a Guardian of the Realm from 1286 to 1292. Comyn submitted to the English king in July 1296 at Montrose.

As a descendant of King Donald III, Comyn was one of the thirteen Competitors for the Crown of Scotland. He did not aggressively push his claim for fear of jeopardising that of his brother-in-law John Balliol.

Comyn, head of the most powerful noble family in Scotland, was a committed ally of Balliol and assisted him in his struggle against Edward I of England. It has even been suggested that the Comyn family was the driving force behind both the Balliol kingship and the revolt against Edward's demands.

John Comyn is credited with the building of several large castles or castle houses in and around Inverness. Parts of Mortlach (Balvenie Castle) and Inverlochy Castle still stand today. John Comyn as his father was before him was entrusted by King Alexander III with the defence of Scotland's northern territories from invasion by the Vikings and the Danes.

== Family ==
Comyn married Eleanor de Balliol, daughter of John I de Balliol of Barnard Castle, sister of King John Balliol. Together they had one son:

- John Comyn III of Badenoch, who married Lady Joan de Valence of Pembroke, daughter of William de Valence, 1st Earl of Pembroke, who was the half-brother to Henry III of England, and uncle of Edward I of England.

== Death ==
John Comyn II of Badenoch died at Lochindorb Castle, in 1302.

== Sources ==
- Tout, Thomas Frederick (1887). "Comyn, John (d.1300?)" . In Stephen, Leslie (ed.). Dictionary of National Biography. Vol. 11. London: Smith, Elder & Co. pp. 459–460.
- Rymer, Thomas; Foedera Conventiones, Literae et cuiuscunque generis Acta Publica inter Reges Angliae, London, 1745. (Latin)
- Young, Alan (2004). "Comyn, Sir John, lord of Badenoch (d. c. 1302)". Oxford Dictionary of National Biography (online) (online ed.). Oxford University Press. doi:10.1093/ref:odnb/6045. (Subscription, Wikipedia Library access or UK public library membership required.)

Peerage of Scotland
Preceded by John Comyn I	Lord of Badenoch; 1277–1302	Succeeded by John Comyn III
