= Battle of Dunbar (1296) =

Part of the First War of Scottish Independence

Coordinates: 55.97692°N 2.52119°W

- Part of the First War of Scottish Independence
Date	27 April 1296
Location	Spott, near Dunbar, East Lothian, Scotland
Result	English victory

Belligerents
Kingdom of Scotland	Kingdom of England

Commanders and leaders
John Balliol	Edward I John de Warenne

Strength
Hundreds of cavalry, Heavily outnumbering the English	Hundreds of cavalry, Fewer than the Scottish

Registered battlefield
- Official name: Battle of Dunbar I
- Designated: 14 December 2012
- Reference no.: BTL31

The Battle of Dunbar was the only significant field action of the campaign of 1296 during the beginning of the First War of Scottish Independence.

== Background ==
King Edward I of England invaded Scotland in March 1296 to punish King John Balliol for his refusal to support English military action in France. After the sack of Berwick-upon-Tweed, Edward rushed to complete the conquest of Scotland, remained in the town for a month, supervising the strengthening of its defences. On 5 April, he received a message from King John renouncing his homage, to which he remarked, "O' foolish knave! What folly he commits. If he will not come to us we will go to him."

The next objective in the campaign was the Earl of March's castle at Dunbar, 29 miles (47 km) up the coast from Berwick. March was with the English, but his wife, Marjory Comyn, sister of the Earl of Buchan, did not share her husband's political loyalties and allowed her fellow Scots to occupy the castle. Edward sent one of his chief lieutenants, John de Warenne, 6th Earl of Surrey, John Balliol's own father-in-law, northwards with a strong force of knights to invest the stronghold. The defenders sent messages to King John, who bivouacked with the main body of his army at nearby Haddington, asking for urgent assistance. In response, the army, or a large part of it, advanced to rescue Dunbar. John, who was showing even less skill as a commander than he had as a king, did not accompany it. The campaign of 1296 was now to enter its final phase.

== Battle ==
There is little evidence to suggest that Dunbar was anything other than an action between two bodies of mounted men-at-arms (armoured cavalry). Surrey's force seems to have comprised one formation (out of four) of the English cavalry; the Scots force led in part by Comyns probably represented the greater part of their cavalry element. The two forces came in sight of each other on 27 April. The Scots occupied a strong position on some high ground to the west. To meet them, Surrey's cavalry had to cross a gully intersected by the Spott Burn. As they did so their ranks broke up, and the Scots, deluded into thinking the English were leaving the field, abandoned their position in a disorderly downhill charge, only to find that Surrey's forces had reformed on Spottsmuir and were advancing in perfect order. The English routed the disorganised Scots in a single charge. The action was brief and probably not very bloody, since the only casualty of any note was a minor Lothian knight, Sir Patrick Graham, though about 100 Scottish lords, knights and men-at-arms were taken prisoner. According to one English source over ten thousand Scots died at the battle of Dunbar, however this is probably a confusion with the casualties incurred at the storming of Berwick. The survivors fled westwards to the safety of the Ettrick Forest. The following day King Edward appeared in person and Dunbar castle surrendered. Some important prisoners were taken: John Comyn, Earl of Buchan, and the earls of Atholl, Ross and Menteith, together with 130 knights and esquires. All were sent into captivity in England.

== Aftermath ==
The battle of Dunbar effectively ended with an English victory. The remainder of the campaign was little more than a grand mopping-up operation. James, the hereditary High Steward of Scotland, surrendered the important fortress at Roxburgh without attempting a defence, and others were quick to follow his example. Only Edinburgh Castle held out for a week against Edward's siege engines. A Scottish garrison sent out to help King John, who had fled north to Forfar, were told to provide for their own safety. Edward himself, true to his word, advanced into central and northern Scotland in pursuit of King John. Stirling Castle, which guarded the vital passage across the River Forth was deserted save for a porter who surrendered the castle to King Edward I. John reached Perth on 21 June, where he received messages from Edward asking for peace.

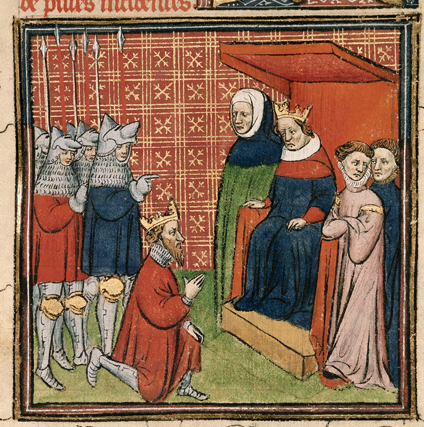
John Balliol, King of Scots, before Edward I of England

John Balliol surrendered and submitted himself to a protracted abasement. At Kincardine Castle on 2 July he confessed to rebellion and prayed for forgiveness. Five days later in the kirkyard of Stracathro he abandoned the treaty with the French. The final humiliation came at Montrose on 8 July. Dressed for the occasion John was ceremoniously stripped of the vestments of royalty. Antony Bek, the Bishop of Durham, ripped the red and gold arms of Scotland from his surcoat, thus bequeathing to history the nickname Toom Tabard (empty coat) by which John has been known to generations of Scottish schoolchildren. He and his son Edward were sent south into captivity. Soon after, the English king followed, carrying in his train the Stone of Scone and other relics of Scottish nationhood.

== Battlefield site ==
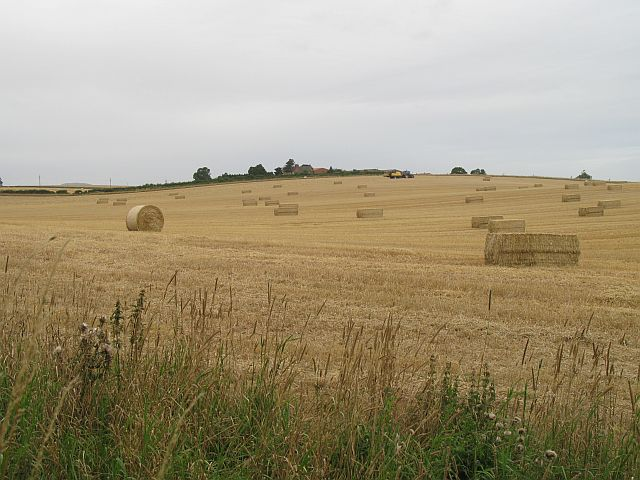
Farmland near the battle site

The battlefield was considered for protection by Historic Scotland under the Scottish Historical Environment Policy 2009.

In 2012 the site was added to the Inventory of Historic Battlefields in Scotland (BTL31). Historic Environment Scotland reports that no archaeological discoveries have been reported from the battle site, and that a 2007 dig failed to yield any battle-related finds. However, it considers that weaponry and other metal objects from the battle may lie undiscovered in the topsoil.
