= Christina Bruce =

Sister of Robert the Bruce

Christian or Christina Bruce (c. 1278 – 1356/1357), also known as Christian or Christina de Brus, was a daughter of Marjorie, Countess of Carrick, and her husband, Robert de Brus, jure uxoris Earl of Carrick, as well as a sister of Robert the Bruce, King of Scots. It is presumed that she and her siblings were born at Turnberry Castle in Carrick.

== Life ==
After his army's defeat at the Battle of Methven on 19 June 1306, Robert Bruce headed west to the mountains. He sent his second wife, Elizabeth, his daughter Marjorie, his sisters Christian (also known as Christina) and Mary Bruce, as well as Isabella MacDuff, Countess of Buchan to Kildrummy Castle in the north, with his brother Nigel (known as Neil) in an attempt to protect them. When Kildrummy was besieged, the women were forced to flee. After Kildrummy Castle was betrayed and captured, Neil de Bruce was taken to Berwick to be hanged, drawn, and beheaded.

The women escorted by John of Strathbogie, Earl of Atholl made it as far as the sanctuary of St. Duthac at Tain in Easter Ross. There, they were captured by a Balliol supporter, Earl William of Ross, who handed them over to Edward I's men. Strathbogie for daring to aid them was executed, his body burned and his head affixed on London Bridge. Christian was sent into solitary confinement at a Gilbertine nunnery at Sixhills in Lincolnshire, while her sister Mary and Bruce's supporter Isabella MacDuff were imprisoned in cages. Her sister-in-law Elizabeth de Burgh was imprisoned at various locations and her niece Marjorie, only 10 years old, was imprisoned at Watton Abbey.

Christian spent eight years as an English prisoner, and returned to Scotland in October 1314 as part of the ransom for the Humphrey de Bohun, Earl of Hereford, who was taken prisoner after the Battle of Bannockburn. In 1335, during the Second War of Scottish Independence, Christina commanded the garrison of Kildrummy Castle and successfully held out against pro-Balliol forces led by David of Strathbogie, prior to their defeat by her husband, Sir Andrew Murray, at the Battle of Culblean.

== Marriage ==
Christian's first marriage was prior to her capture, in 1301 she married Sir Christopher Seton, who was born in 1278. The marriage ended in 1306 when he was hanged, drawn and quartered by the English. In July 1326, at Cambuskenneth Abbey, when the Papal dispensation for their marriage is dated, Christian was married for a second time to Sir Andrew Murray, the posthumous child (b. 1298) of Andrew Moray, joint leader with William Wallace of the victorious Scots army at the Battle of Stirling Bridge. Sir Andrew died in 1338. Sir Andrew Murray had 2 sons: Sir John Murray (d.1351), and Sir Thomas Murray (d.1361) and some commentators argue that Christian may have been their step-mother due to her estimated age at their birth.

Christian is sometimes reported in error to have also married Gartnait, son of Donald, Earl of Mar (died 1305). She is never described as a Countess of Mar, however, or even described as "of Mar". Moreover, there is no evidence of any familial relationship with Gartnait's son and successor, Donald II. A marriage to Gartnait would have been in direct conflict with her marriage to Seton, who she is known to have married in 1301 and which ended in 1306, well after the death of Gartnait in 1305.

== Sources ==
- French, Morvern, 'Christina Bruce and Her Defence of Kildrummy Castle', Royal Studies Journal (RSJ), 7:1 (2020), pp. 22-38
- Penman, Michael Robert the Bruce: King of the Scots
- Traquair, Peter Freedom's Sword
- Watson, F (2004a). "Bruce, Christian (d. 1356)". Oxford Dictionary of National Biography (online ed.). Oxford University Press. doi:10.1093/ref:odnb/60019. (Subscription or UK public library membership required.)
- Watson, F (2004b). "Donald, Eighth Earl of Mar (1293–1332)". Oxford Dictionary of National Biography (online ed.). Oxford University Press. doi:10.1093/ref:odnb/18021. (Subscription or UK public library membership required.)
