= Elizabeth de Burgh =

Queen of Scots from 1306 to 1327

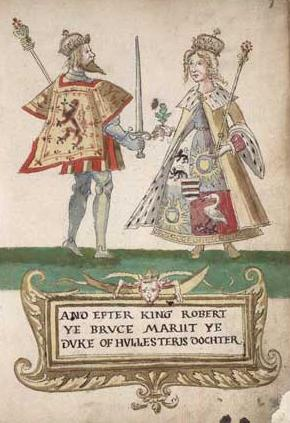
- Robert the Bruce and Elizabeth de Burgh, from the Seton Armorial.

Queen consort of Scots
- Tenure: 1306–1327
- Coronation: 27 March 1306
- Born: c. 1289; County Down or County Antrim
- Died: 27 October 1327 (aged approx. 38); Cullen, Banffshire
- Burial: Dunfermline Abbey
- Spouse: Robert I of Scotland (m. 1302)
- Issue: Matilda; Margaret; David II of Scotland; John of Scotland
- House: House of Burgh
- Father: Richard Óg de Burgh, Earl of Ulster
- Mother: Margarite de Burgh

Elizabeth de Burgh (English: /dəˈbɜːr/ də-BUR; c. 1289 – 27 October 1327) was the second wife and only queen consort of Robert the Bruce, King of Scots. Elizabeth was born sometime around 1289, probably in what is now County Down or County Antrim in Ulster, the northern province in Ireland. She was the daughter of one of the most powerful Norman nobles in the Lordship of Ireland at that time, Richard Óg de Burgh, the 2nd Earl of Ulster, a member of the noble dynasty, the House of Burgh and a close friend and ally to King Edward I of England.

Not much is known about Elizabeth, despite her husband's status as one of the most famous Scottish kings and warriors. As is the case with most medieval women, records of Elizabeth are scarce; however, it is clear that she was caught up in the political turmoil that unfolded between the Scottish and the English during the reign of her husband King Robert, had to move several times to keep safe and was eventually seized as a prisoner.

== Life ==
She was born in Ulster in the north of Ireland (c. 1289), the daughter of the powerful Richard Óg de Burgh, the lord of Ulster, and his wife, Margarite de Burgh (died 1304). Her father, Lord Ulster, was a close friend of King Edward I of England.

Elizabeth probably met Robert the Bruce, then Earl of Carrick, at the English court. They married in 1302 at Writtle, near Chelmsford in Essex, England, at which time Robert was a widower with a young daughter from his first marriage. Elizabeth would have been about 13 years old, and Robert 28.

On 27 March 1306, Robert and Elizabeth were crowned as King and Queen of Scots at Scone. The coronation took place in defiance of the English claims of suzerainty after Edward I stripped John de Baliol of the crown of Scotland. After his coronation, she is quoted as having said,

Alas, we are but king and queen of the May!

as though fearing a defeat by Edward I.

== Capture ==
After the defeat of the Scots at the Battle of Methven on 19 June 1306, Robert sent Queen Elizabeth, his daughter Marjorie by his first marriage, and his sisters Mary and Christina to Kildrummy Castle, under the protection of his brother Niall (also known as Nigel).

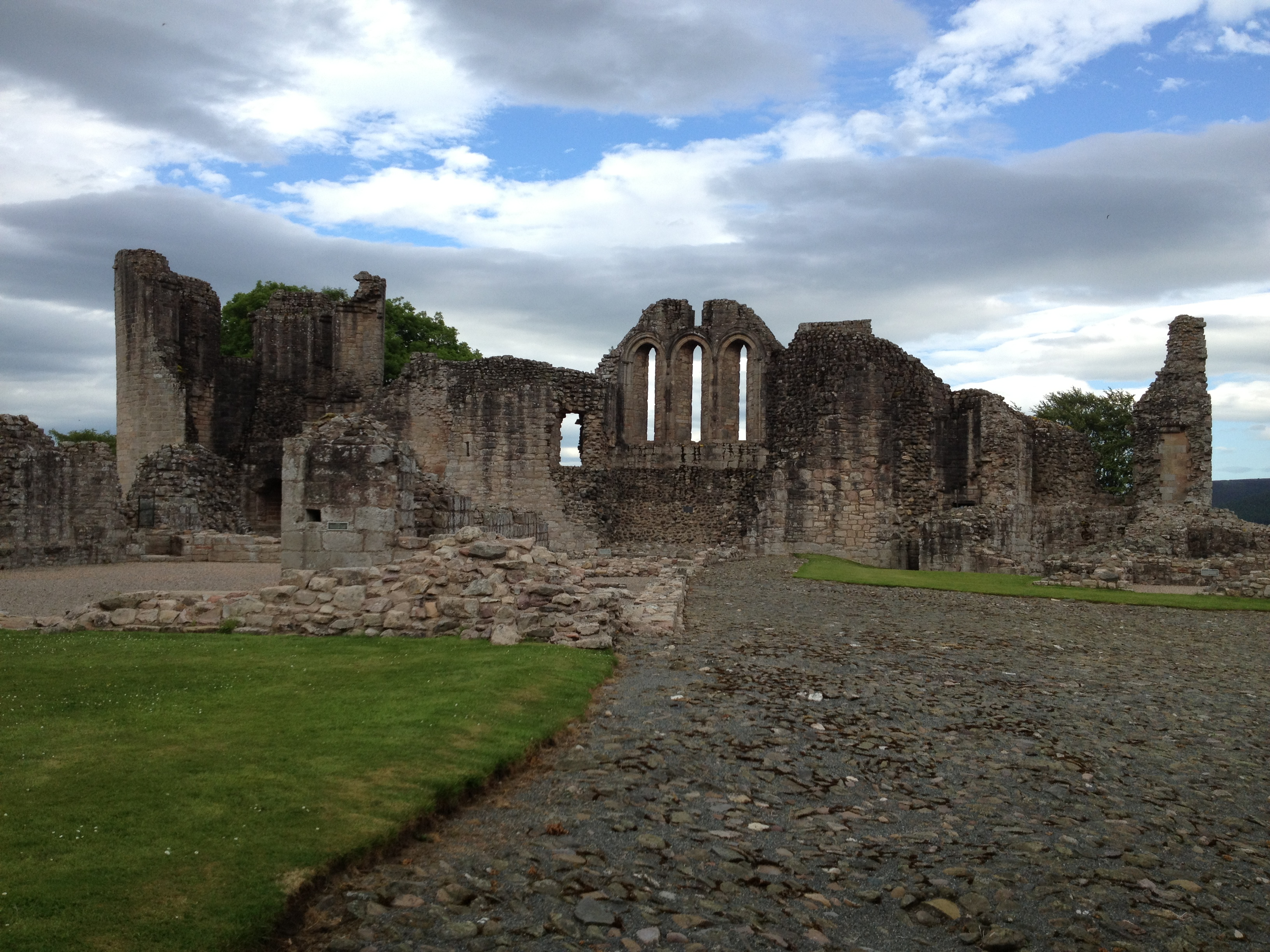
The ruins of Kildrummy Castle in Aberdeenshire

The English laid siege to the castle containing the royal party. The siege finally succeeded when the English bribed a blacksmith with "all the gold he could carry" to set fire to the grain store. The victors hanged, drawn and quartered Niall Bruce, along with all the men from the castle. However, the royal ladies under the escort of The 9th Earl of Atholl had already fled.

They were taken from the sanctuary of St. Duthac at Tain by The Earl of Ross, a supporter of the Comyns, and dispatched to King Edward. He imprisoned Bruce's sister Mary and Isabella, Countess of Buchan, in wooden cages erected on the walls of Roxburgh and Berwick castles respectively, and then sent Bruce's nine-year-old daughter Marjorie to the nunnery at Watton.

Elizabeth was held under severe conditions of house arrest in England while Edward still needed aid from her father. The Earl of Atholl was hanged and his head displayed on London Bridge.

She was imprisoned for eight years by the English. From October 1306 to July 1308 she was held at Burstwick-in-Holderness, Yorkshire, where she, only served by two elder women, wrote a letter complaining about her condition (she had only 3 clothes and no headgear or linen bed clothing), before being transferred to Bisham Manor, Berkshire, until March 1312. From there, she was moved to Windsor Castle with six attendants and an allowance, where she was held until October 1312, Shaftesbury Abbey, Dorset, until March 1313, Barking Abbey, Essex, until March 1314, and Rochester Castle, Kent, until June 1314. After the Battle of Bannockburn, she was moved to York while prisoner exchange talks took place. At York, she had an audience with King Edward II of England. She was released in 1315 as part of the ransom for the Earl of Hereford who had been captured after the Battle of Bannockburn on 29 September 1314.

Queen Elizabeth had three children who reached adulthood: Matilda, Margaret, and David (the future King David II of Scotland).

== Death ==
Elizabeth died aged approximately 38 years old, on 27 October 1327, after falling from her horse during a visit to the royal residence at Cullen, Banffshire.

Plans were immediately made to transport her body to Dunfermline Abbey in Fife, the resting place of Scottish kings and queens since 1093. As parishioners in Cullen were worried that her remains would not arrive intact, they took the step of having her internal organs removed during the embalming process. While some sources claim that her entrails were transported separately to Fife, others state that they were buried in the parish church of Cullen. The parishioners also had Masses said to pray for her soul.

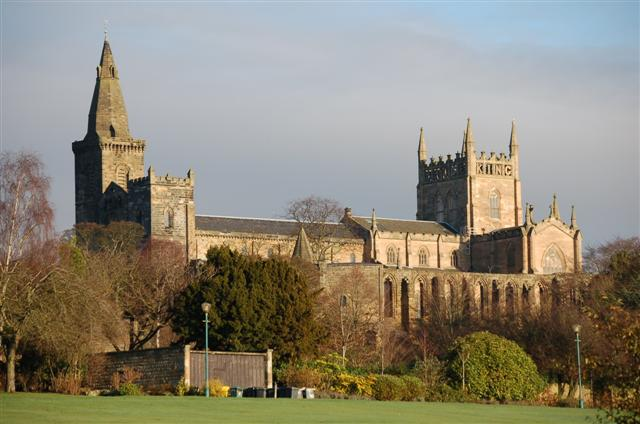
Dunfermline Abbey

Robert, in gratitude for the treatment of Elizabeth's body and its return south for burial, decreed that a chaplaincy be established at the Auld Kirk of Cullen (parish church of Cullen) and paid in perpetuity the sum of five Pound Scots to have Masses said for the soul of Elizabeth. Robert's original bequest was augmented by Mary, Queen of Scots, in 1543 and continued to be paid by different bodies throughout the centuries until changes and loss of records due to local government reform in 1975, which led to the stopping of payments. In 2011, the church's minister, the Rev Melvyn Wood, applied to the Moray Council to have the tradition re-instated and, after a lengthy investigation, the Council agreed to reinstate the annual payment of £2.10 and even agreed to pay for the missed installments. A prayer is now said in the Queen's honour at a Sunday service which also remembers parishioners who have died in the last year.

When King Robert died 18 months later, his body was laid to rest next to Elizabeth, who had been interred in the very centre of the abbey beneath the high altar, in an alabaster tomb decorated with gold leaf. Fragments of the tomb still remain and can be seen in the National Museum of Scotland. The abbey was sacked in 1560 by Calvinists during the Scottish Reformation and the tomb was lost. However, King Robert's coffin was rediscovered in 1819 during construction work on the new abbey and Elizabeth's coffin was rediscovered in 1917. Both were re-interred in the new abbey.

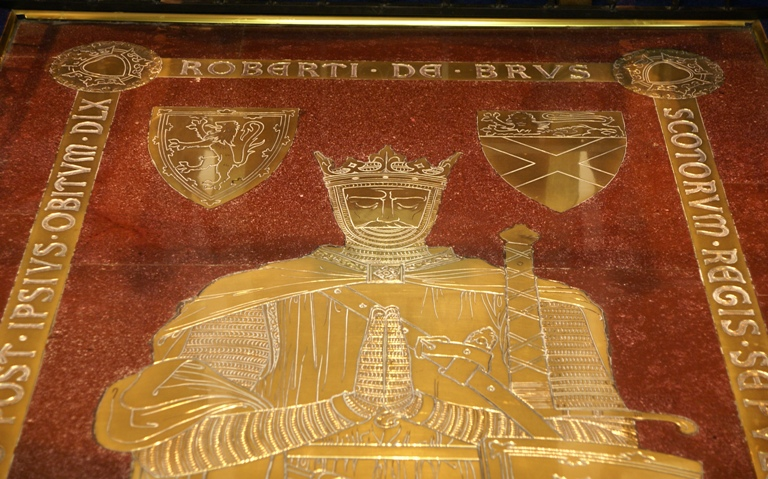
Victorian brass plate covering the tomb of Robert Bruce and Elizabeth de Burgh

== Issue ==
Name	Birth	Death	Notes
Margaret	between 1315 and 1323	30 March 1346 in childbirth	Married William de Moravia, 5th Earl of Sutherland and had one son, John (1346–1361), who died aged twenty of the Black Death.
Matilda (Maud)	between 1315 and 1323	30 July 1353	Married Thomas Isak/Isaac and had two daughters, Joanna (wife of John Gallda MacDougall) and Catherine. Buried at Dunfermline Abbey
David	5 March 1324	22 February 1371	King of Scots (1329 – 1371). Married (1) in 1328 Joan of England; no issue; married (2) in 1364 Margaret Drummond; no issue.
John	5 March 1324	October 1327; Dunfermline Palace, Fife	Younger twin brother of David II. Heir to the Crown of Scotland.
Elizabeth Bruce	Unknown	After 1364	Married Sir Walter Oliphant of Aberdalgie and Dupplin.

== In popular culture ==
Elizabeth de Burgh was portrayed by English actress Florence Pugh in the 2018 historical drama film Outlaw King.

She features prominently in Nigel Tranter's trilogy regarding the life of Robert de Bruce, featuring the couple's match-making (by Edward I of England), marriage, separation and the eventual birth of their children.

== See also ==
- House of Burgh, an Anglo-Norman and Hiberno-Norman dynasty founded in 1193
- Richard Óg de Burgh, 2nd Earl of Ulster
- Robert the Bruce
- David II of Scotland
- Wars of Scottish Independence

Scottish royalty
Preceded by Yolande de Dreux	Queen consort of Scotland; 1306–1327	Succeeded by Joan of The Tower
