= Outlaw King =

2018 film by David Mackenzie

- Promotional poster
- Directed by: David Mackenzie
- Written by: Bash Doran; David Mackenzie; James MacInnes
- Produced by: David Mackenzie; Gillian Berrie
- Starring: Chris Pine; Aaron Taylor-Johnson; Florence Pugh; Billy Howle; Sam Spruell; Tony Curran; Callan Mulvey; James Cosmo; Stephen Dillane
- Cinematography: Barry Ackroyd
- Edited by: Jake Roberts
- Music by: Grey Dogs
- Production companies: Sigma Films; Anonymous Content
- Distributed by: Netflix
- Release dates: September 6, 2018 (TIFF); November 9, 2018 (United States)
- Running time: 121 minutes
- Countries: United Kingdom; United States
- Language: English
- Budget: $120 million

Outlaw King is a 2018 historical action drama film, co-written, produced, and directed by David Mackenzie. Chris Pine stars as Scottish king Robert the Bruce during the Scottish Wars of Independence in 1304–07. The ensemble cast also features Aaron Taylor-Johnson, Florence Pugh, Billy Howle, Sam Spruell, Tony Curran, Callan Mulvey, James Cosmo and Stephen Dillane.

Outlaw King premiered at the Toronto International Film Festival on September 6, 2018, and was released on streaming on November 9 by Netflix. The film received mixed reviews from critics.

== Plot ==
In 1304, outside the besieged Stirling Castle, John Comyn, Robert Bruce, and their allies, surrender to Edward I of England and pay him their homage.

Afterwards, Bruce spars with the king's son, Edward, Prince of Wales, whom he had known as a child (their fathers becoming friends while on crusade in the Holy Land). A widower, he is betrothed to the king's goddaughter, Elizabeth de Burgh. Lord James Douglas arrives, asking for the restoration of his ancestral lands, but is denied on the grounds that his father Lord Douglas committed treason. The King and Prince depart Scotland, with Bruce and Comyn acting as their vassals under the supervision of the Earl of Pembroke, Aymer de Valence.

Robert marries Elizabeth but respectfully delays the consummation as she is just 13, and he being 28. Elizabeth is, however, an increasingly important presence in the life of Robert's daughter, Marjorie. Not long after, his father, the Lord of Annandale dies, with his last breath regretting his friendship with the King of England.

Soon after, while delivering tax monies to the English, Bruce notes their unpopularity. Rioting ensues when news of the rebel William Wallace's execution reaches Scotland. Bruce decides to organize another rebellion with the support of his family, including Elizabeth. He meets Comyn in a church, trying to persuade him to join the rebellion but as Comyn threatens to inform Edward, Bruce kills him. The Scottish clergy offers Bruce absolution for serving the English and supports Bruce's bid for the crown of Scotland if he supports the Catholic Church. King Edward declares Bruce an outlaw and orders the Prince of Wales to suppress his uprising, with instructions that no quarter is to be shown to any Bruce supporter.

Calling a council of Scottish nobles, most refuse to break their oaths to Edward. Despite the lack of support, Bruce and Elizabeth heads to Scone to be crowned king of the Scots. On the way, Douglas pledges his allegiance. The ambitious de Valence, brother-in-law to Comyn, tries to move against Bruce before the Prince arrives. To avoid bloodshed, he challenges de Valence to single combat, who accepts but delays the duel a day, as it is Sunday. That night, Bruce and Elizabeth finally consummate their marriage. Before Bruce and de Valence can combat the English launch a surprise attack. Elizabeth and Marjorie Bruce are sent to safety with Robert's brother, Nigel, as Robert fights a losing battle, during which most of the Scottish army is killed. Escaping with fifty men, they flee to Islay. On the way, John MacDougall parleys with them, bitter about the murder of his cousin Comyn but allows them to pass. Later, however, he attacks Bruce as his party attempts to cross Loch Ryan. Some get away in boats, but Bruce's brother Alexander dies.

Prince Edward arrives in Scotland, searching for Bruce at Kildrummy Castle, only to find Bruce's wife, daughter, and brother. The prince has Nigel hung, drawn, and quartered, and sends Marjorie and Elizabeth into captivity in England. Bruce's band presses on to Islay anyway; there, they learn of the fall of Kildrummy Castle. Bruce decides to take back the castle through stealth. The successful operation inspires him to utilize guerilla warfare against the more powerful English. Shortly thereafter, Robert the Bruce is reunited with his only surviving brother, Edward. In England, Elizabeth learns that Marjorie has been sent to a nunnery by King Edward. After Edward hears Douglas Castle has been re-taken, he goes after Bruce himself. Edward offers amnesty to Elizabeth if she renounces her marriage, but she refuses and is put in a hanging cage.

King Edward I dies shortly after arriving in Scotland, and his son Edward II takes over his forces. Bruce fights the new king in a pitched battle at Loudoun Hill, despite being outnumbered six to one. As Edward II's army is composed almost entirely of cavalry, Robert overcomes his army's size disadvantage in the battle with a spear wall hidden by a ditch. Attempting to attack the flanks, horsemen become bogged down in the mud, as anticipated. The English knights fall from their horses, many are slain, and the battle becomes an open brawl, where the Scots prevail over the disoriented English soldiers, with James killing the noble to whom King Edward had granted his family's lands. Realizing the battle is hopeless, de Valence orders a retreat. However, determined to kill his nemesis, Edward II does not join them. Instead, he duels Bruce as the Scots look on. Edward is outmatched, and realizing he is about to be slain, he vomits in fear and cries for help. Bruce prevails, allowing Edward II to leave unarmed and unharmed.

== Cast ==
- Chris Pine as Robert the Bruce, King of Scotland
- Aaron Taylor-Johnson as James Douglas, Lord of Douglas
- Florence Pugh as Elizabeth de Burgh
- Billy Howle as Edward, Prince of Wales
- Sam Spruell as Aymer de Valence, Earl of Pembroke
- Tony Curran as Angus Og MacDonald, Lord of Islay
- Callan Mulvey as John III Comyn, Lord of Badenoch
- James Cosmo as Robert de Brus, 6th Lord of Annandale
- Stephen Dillane as King Edward I of England
- Steven Cree as Sir Christopher Seton
- Alastair Mackenzie as John of Strathbogie, Earl of Atholl
- Chris Fulton as Euan (Edward) Bruce
- Lorne MacFadyen as Neil Bruce
- Jack Greenlees as Alexander Bruce

== Production ==
Principal photography began on 28 August 2017 on location in both Scotland and England. Filming took place in various locations including Linlithgow Palace & Loch, and St Michael's Parish Church, Borthwick Castle, Doune Castle, Craigmillar Castle, Dunfermline Abbey, Glasgow Cathedral, Muiravonside Country Park, Mugdock Country Park, Aviemore, Isle of Skye (Talisker Bay, Coral Beaches and Loch Dunvegan), Glen Coe, Loch Lomond, Gargunnock, University of Glasgow, Blackness Castle, Seacliff Beach and Berwick-upon-Tweed and Tweedmouth (the latter two both in Northumberland - Berwick-upon-Tweed's bridge doubling for London Bridge). Principal production concluded in November 2017.

== Release ==
The film had its world premiere at the Toronto International Film Festival on September 6, 2018. The premiere's runtime of 137 minutes and its pacing were criticized in early reviews, and Mackenzie subsequently cut nearly 20 minutes from the film. Cut material includes a battle scene, a major confrontation back-dropped by a waterfall, an eight-minute chase sequence, and a scene in which Pine's character meets William Wallace in the woods. The film had its European premiere at the London Film Festival in October 2018 and was commercially released on November 9, 2018.

== Reception ==
=== Critical response ===
On the review aggregator website Rotten Tomatoes, 63% of 155 critics' reviews are positive, with an average rating of 6.2/10. The website's consensus reads: "Muddy and bloody to a fault, Outlaw King doesn't skimp on the medieval battle scenes, but tends to lose track of the fact-based legend at the heart of its story." Metacritic, which uses a weighted average, assigned the film a score of 59 out of 100, based on 38 critics, indicating "mixed or average" reviews.

=== Accolades ===
Award	Date of ceremony	Category	Recipients	Result	Ref.
Visual Effects Society Awards	February 5, 2019	Outstanding Supporting Visual Effects in a Photoreal Feature	Alex Bicknell, Dan Bethell, Greg O'Connor, Stefano Pepin	Nominated	

=== Historical authenticity ===
The film implies that Robert I ("Robert the Bruce") began his rebellion almost immediately after the execution of William Wallace, implying that he intended to avenge Wallace. He began his rebellion a full year after Wallace's death. During the intermediate period, Edward I became suspicious of Robert I and ordered him to stay at Kildrummy Castle.

The film's depiction of Edward II's role in the Battle of Loudoun Hill is heavily flawed. It is unlikely that he was present at the battle in any capacity. Moreover, it is certain that he would not have challenged Bruce to single combat. Even if he had been present and challenged Bruce to personal combat, a hostage as valuable as Edward II would not have been allowed to flee.

The title character in Outlaw King is that of an enigmatic and well-behaved man of the people who desires to restore Scotland to its inhabitants. However, historian Fiona Watson speculates that the real Robert I was most likely cold, canny, and driven by his personal ambition.

The color yellow is mostly absent from the clothing of the fighting men. In contrast, the yellow dye was not only the most common dye in Scotland during the period, but it was also highly favoured by the fighters with the means to afford it. Historian Fergus Cannan notes that while many historical writers comment on its prevalence, it remains absent from appearances in popular culture related to Scottish history.

== See also ==
- Robert the Bruce (2019) stars Angus Macfadyen as Robert the Bruce, but depicts different events.
