= Earl of Carrick =

Title applied to the ruler of Carrick in Scotland

Earldom of Carrick
- The red chevron of Carrick
- Creation date: 1186
- Created by: William the Lion
- Peerage: Peerage of Scotland
- First holder: Duncan
- Present holder: Prince William, Duke of Rothesay
- Heir apparent: Prince George
- Former seat: Turnberry Castle

Earl of Carrick (Scottish Gaelic: Iarla Charraig; also Mormaer of Carrick) is the title applied to the ruler of Carrick, Ayrshire, subsequently part of the Peerage of Scotland. The position came to be strongly associated with the Scottish crown when Robert the Bruce, who had inherited it from his maternal kin, became King of Scots in the early 14th century. Since the 15th century, the title of Earl of Carrick has automatically been held by the heir apparent to the throne, thus the current holder of the title is Prince William, Duke of Rothesay.

== Early rulers ==
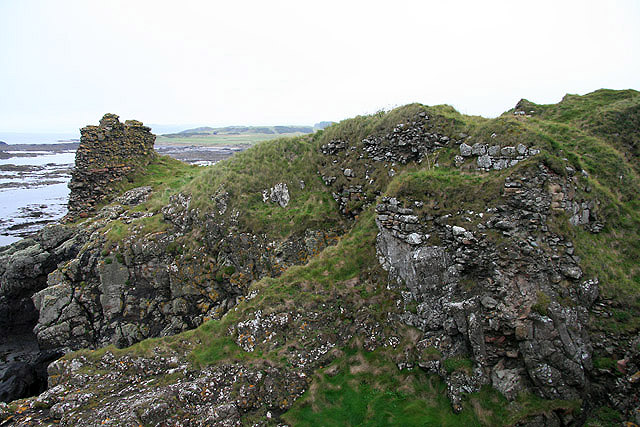
The ruins of Turnberry Castle on the Carrick coast, former seat of the Earls of Carrick

The earldom emerged in 1186, out of the old Lordship of Galloway, which had previously encompassed all of what is now known as Galloway as well as the southern part of Ayrshire. Though the Lords of Galloway recognised the King of Scots as their overlord, their lordship was effectively a separate polity governed by its own laws. The first Lord recorded is Fergus, who died in 1161 leaving two sons: Uchtred and Gille Brigte (Gilbert). As was the custom then, the two brothers shared the lordship and the lands between them. In 1174, they joined with King William the Lion in his invasion of Northumberland. However, after King William was taken prisoner by the English, the Galwegians broke into rebellion. Uchtred, who remained loyal to the Scottish king, was savagely murdered by Gille Brigte's son Máel Coluim, and Gille Brigte took control of the entirety of Galloway. In 1175, King William was restored to liberty, and he marched an army into Galloway to bring justice upon Gille Brigte. However, he seems to have contented himself with exacting a fine, leaving Gille Brigte unharmed.

In 1176, Gille Brigte obtained an agreement with King Henry II of England, in which he became his vassal; in exchange, he paid the English king the then enormous sum of £919 9s. and gave his son Duncan (Donnchadh) as a hostage. Gille Brigte then spent the next decade carrying out devastating raids on King William's territory, with the protection of the English.

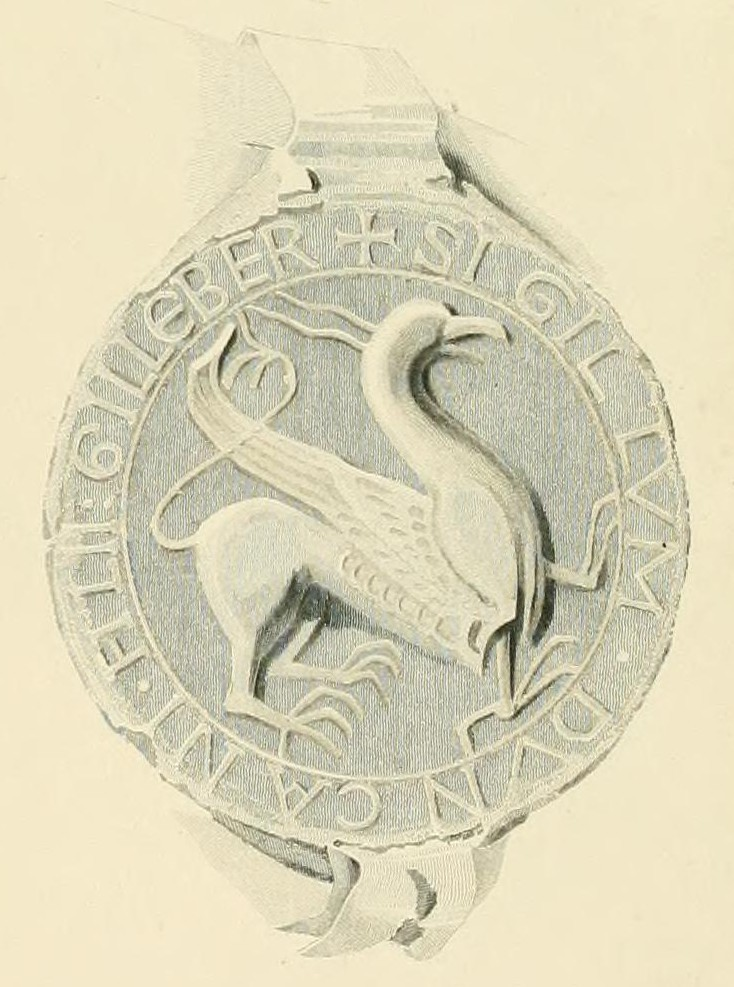
Earl Duncan's seal. The caption reads sigillvm dvncani filli gilleber, Latin for "seal of Duncan/Donnchadh son of Gilbert/Gille Brigte". The symbol in the centre is a griffin; later earls used the device of a chevron

Gille Brigte's death in 1185 was the signal for general turmoil amongst the Galwegians. Roland, son of the murdered Uchtred, defeated the supporters of Gille Brigte in 1185, and planted forts across Galloway to secure his authority. This angered King Henry, and he marched a large force to Carlisle in preparation for invasion. However, war was averted at a meeting between Roland, William and Henry, when it was agreed that Roland would rule the main part of Galloway, while Gille Brigte's son Duncan would rule the northern section, known as Carrick. Duncan agreed to these terms, and renounced all claims to the Lordship of Galloway, becoming the first Earl of Carrick.

Duncan married Avelina, daughter of Alan, High Steward of Scotland. His grandson Niall's eldest daughter Marjorie succeeded him, becoming Countess of Carrick in her own right. She married firstly Adam de Kilconquhar. In 1269, Adam journeyed to the Holy Land with a Scottish contingent led by David Strathbogie, Earl of Atholl, under the banners of King Louis IX of France, as part of the Eighth Crusade. He never returned, dying of disease at Acre in 1270. The next year, the widowed Countess happened to meet Robert de Brus hunting in her lands. According to legend, Marjorie imprisoned Robert until he agreed to marry her. They were married at Turnberry Castle, without their families' knowledge or the requisite consent of the King. When news got out, Alexander III seized her castles and estates, but she later atoned for her foolishness with a fine, and Robert was recognised as her husband and Earl of Carrick jure uxoris. They had five sons and five daughters: Robert, Edward, Thomas, Alexander, Nigel, Isabel, Mary, Christina, Matilda and Margaret.

Turnberry Castle, situated on the coast of Carrick, was a key strategic site in medieval Scotland. As the seat of the Earls of Carrick, it allowed control over the surrounding lands and the Firth of Clyde, making it vital for defense and military operations. It played a role in Robert de Brus early campaigns during the Wars of Scottish Independence, serving as a gathering point for his supporters.

== Royal earls ==
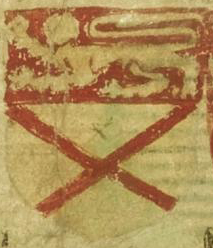
Arms of the Earl of Carrick as depicted in the Balliol roll.

Marjorie and Robert were succeeded by their eldest son. When the old House of Dunkeld became extinct, this Robert, known as "the Bruce", became a principal candidate for the throne as the great-great-great-great-grandson of David I. He was crowned at Scone in 1306, causing his Scots titles (Earl of Carrick and Lord of Annandale) to merge into the Crown. The title of Baron Bruce in the Peerage of England, in so far as it existed, "would either have been forfeited in 1306, or after the death ... of ... King David II, 22 Feb 1371, would, according to modern doctrine, have fallen into abeyance between [Robert I's] daughters and coheirs, the sisters of the late King."

Around 1313, King Robert made his younger brother Edward the Earl of Carrick. Edward had no issue, save a natural son he had by Lady Isabella Strathbogie, daughter of John, Earl of Atholl. The title therefore became extinct on his death at the Battle of Faughart in 1318.

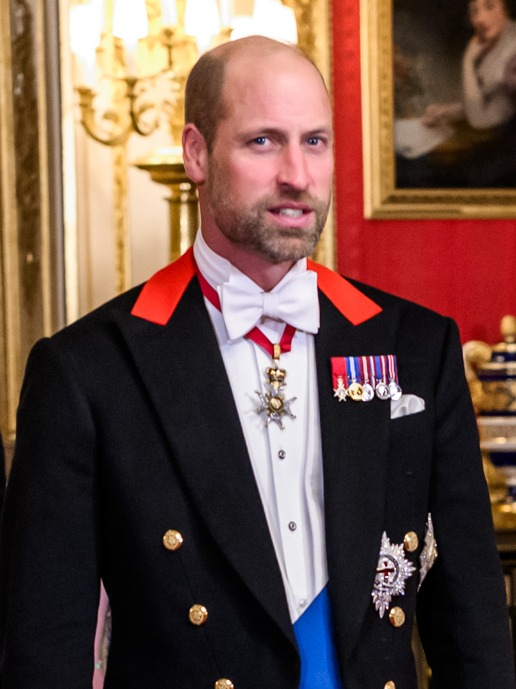
Prince William, Duke of Rothesay, is the incumbent Earl of Carrick

After briefly being held by Robert's son David prior to his accession to the throne, the title was granted in 1332 to Alexander, Edward's bastard. However, Alexander was killed the next year at the Battle of Halidon Hill and the title again became extinct.

In 1368, King David created his great-nephew John Stewart the Earl of Carrick. David died unexpectedly in 1371. He had no children, meaning he was succeeded by his nephew Robert Stewart, John's father. After Robert's death in 1390, John succeeded him, taking the regnal name Robert III; thus the Earldom of Carrick again merged with the Crown.

The title was next held by Robert III's son David, who was also created Duke of Rothesay and Earl of Atholl. David died childless in 1402, and the Earldom was regranted to his brother James; however he was generally known by the higher title Prince or Great Steward of Scotland. James acceded to the throne in 1406, and his titles merged with the Crown.

In 1469, the Scottish Parliament passed an Act declaring that the eldest son of the king and heir to the throne would automatically hold the earldom, along with the dukedom of Rothesay. After the Union of the Crowns of Scotland and England, the dukedom and earldom have been held by the eldest son and heir apparent of the monarchs of Great Britain, if those are the same person. If there is no heir apparent or the heir apparent is not the son of the monarch, then this title, as do the Dukedoms of Rothesay and Cornwall, lapses to the Crown. Thus, the current Duke of Rothesay and Earl of Carrick is Prince William, Duke of Rothesay.

== Creation of 1628 ==
In 1628, King Charles I created John Stewart the Earl of Carrick in the Peerage of Scotland. He had already been made Lord Kincleven in 1607, also in the Peerage of Scotland. He was a younger son of Robert, Earl of Orkney, bastard son of King James V; thus, he was Charles's half-great-uncle. This title was deemed not to conflict with the Earldom of Carrick held by the heir to the throne, as it referred not to the province in Ayrshire, but instead to the lands of Carrick on Eday in Orkney.

John Stewart married Lady Elizabeth Southwell, daughter of Charles Howard, Earl of Nottingham, and widow of Sir Robert Southwell. By her, he had one daughter, Margaret. He is also known to have had two natural children: a son, named Henry, and a daughter, whose name is unknown. As he had no legitimate son, his titles became extinct on his death around 1645.

== List of holders ==
=== Early rulers ===
- Gille Brigte (d. 1185), ruler of the region without comital title
- Donnchadh, Earl of Carrick (d. 1250)
- Niall, Earl of Carrick (d. 1256)
- Marjorie, Countess of Carrick (d. 1292)

=== Bruce earls ===
- Robert Bruce (1292–1314), became King Robert I of Scotland on 1306, died in 1329.
- Edward Bruce (1314–1318), Robert's brother, became High-King of Ireland in 1315, died in 1318.
- reverted to crown
- David Bruce (1328–1330) – became King David II of Scotland in 1329, died in 1371.
- Alexander de Brus, Earl of Carrick (1330–1333), illegitimate son of Edward Bruce, died in 1333.
- Eleanor Bruce, daughter of Alexander, married William de Cunningham.
- reverted to crown

=== Stewart earls ===
- Robert Stewart, Earl of Carrick (1316–1390) [reigned as King Robert II of Scotland from 1371 to his death as the first monarch of the House of Stewart]
- John Stewart, Earl of Carrick (c. 1368–1390) [became King Robert III of Scotland in 1390]
- David Stewart, Duke of Rothesay (1398–1402)
- reverted to crown
- James Stewart, Duke of Rothesay (1404–1437) [became King James I of Scotland in 1406]

=== Later earls ===
See Duke of Rothesay for further Earls of Carrick.

=== 1628 earldom ===
- John Stewart, Earl of Carrick (this earldom refers to the lands of Carrick on Eday in Orkney, not Carrick in Ayrshire)

== Family tree ==
Family tree of the Princes of Wales, Dukes of Cornwall, Dukes of Rothesay, Earls of Carrick and Earls of Chester

Earl of Chester (1st creation), 1067–1070
Gerbod the Fleming (?); Earl of Chester	Richard Goz (d. after 1082)	King William I (c. 1028–1087)
Earldom of Chester (1st creation) forfeit, 1071
Earl of Chester (2nd creation), 1071
Maud (Margaret)	Hugh d'Avranches (c. 1047–1101); 1st Earl of Chester	Adela of Normandy (c. 1067–1137)	Stephen, Count of Blois (c. 1045–1102)	King Henry I (c. 1068–1135)
Ranulf le Meschin (1070–1129); 3rd Earl of Chester	Richard d'Avranches (1094–1120); 2nd Earl of Chester	Lucia-Mahaut (d. 1120)	Robert Rufus (c. 1090–1147); Earl of Gloucester
Ranulf de Gernon (1099–1153); 4th Earl of Chester	Maud (Matilda) of Gloucester (d. 1189)
Hugh of Cyfeiliog (1147–1181); 5th Earl of Chester
Ranulf de Blondeville (1170–1232); 6th Earl of Chester, Earl of Lincoln	Matilda (Maud) (1171–1233); Countess of Chester suo jure
Earl of Chester (4th creation), 1264
John of Scotland (c. 1207–1237); 7th Earl of Chester, Earl of Huntingdon	Simon de Montfort (1208–1265); Earl of Chester, Earl of Leicester
Earldom of Chester (2nd creation) reverted to the crown, 1237	Earl of Chester (3rd creation), 1254	Earldom of Chester (4th creation) forfeit, 1265
Edward, Lord of Chester (1239–1307); Earl of Chester (without the title of Earl), later King Edward I
Earldom of Chester (3rd creation) reverted to the crown, 1272
Earl of Chester (5th creation), 1301
Edward of Caernarfon (1284–1327); Prince of Wales and Earl of Chester; 1301–1307, later King Edward II
Earldom of Chester (5th creation) reverted to the crown, 1307
Earl of Chester (6th creation), 1312
Robert Stewart (1316–1390); Earl of Carrick (1316–1368), later King Robert II of Scots	Edward Plantagenet (1312–1377); Earl of Chester (1312–1327), later King Edward III
Hereafter, the Earldom of Chester was created in conjunction with the Principality of Wales.
Duke of Cornwall, 1337
John Stewart (1337–1406); Earl of Carrick (1368–1390), later King Robert III of Scots	Edward the Black Prince (1330–1376); Duke of Cornwall (1337–1376), Prince of Wales (1343–1376)	John of Gaunt (1340–1399); Duke of Lancaster	Lionel of Antwerp (1338–1368); Duke of Clarence	Edmund of Langley (1341–1402); Duke of York
Dukedom of Cornwall extinct, 1376
Duke of Cornwall, 1376
Richard of Bordeaux (1367–1400); Prince of Wales (1376–1377), Duke of Cornwall (1376–1377), later King Richard II	John Beaufort (c. 1371–1410)	King Henry IV (1366–1413)	Philippa of Clarence (1355–1382)
Dukedom of Cornwall merged in the Crown, 1377
Roger Mortimer (1374–1398)
Duke of Rothesay created, 1398	Duke of Cornwall restored, 1399
David Stewart (1378–1402); Earl of Carrick (1390–1402); Duke of Rothesay (1398–1402)	Henry of Monmouth (1386–1422); Prince of Wales (1399–1413), Duke of Cornwall (1399–1413), later King Henry V	Anne de Mortimer (1390–1411)	Richard of Conisburgh (c. 1375–1415); Earl of Cambridge
Duke of Cornwall, 1460
James (1394–1437); Earl of Carrick (1402–1406); Duke of Rothesay (1404–1406), later King James I of Scots	Joan Beaufort (c. 1404–1445)	John Beaufort (1404–1444); Duke of Somerset	Henry (1421–1471); Duke of Cornwall (1421–1422), later King Henry VI	Richard Plantagenet (1411–1460); Duke of York; Prince of Wales (1460), Duke of Cornwall (1460)
Alexander Stewart (1430); Duke of Rothesay (1430)	James (1430–1460); Duke of Rothesay (1431–1437), later King James II of Scots	Margaret Beaufort (1443–1509)	King Edward IV (1442–1483)	King Richard III (1452–1485)
James (1451–1488); Duke of Rothesay (1452–1460), later King James III of Scots	King Henry VII (1457–1509)	Edward of Westminster (1453–1471); Prince of Wales (1454–1471), Duke of Cornwall (1454–1471)
From the 1469 Act of Scottish Parliament, the Earldom of Carrick and the Dukedom of Rothesay was to be automatically held by the "first-born Prince of the King of Scots."
James (1473–1513); Duke of Rothesay (1473–1488), later King James IV of Scots	Margaret Tudor (1489–1541)	Arthur Tudor (1486–1502); Prince of Wales (1489–1502), Duke of Cornwall (1486–1502)	Henry Tudor (1491–1547); Prince of Wales (1504–1509), Duke of Cornwall (1502–1509), later King Henry VIII	Edward (1470–1483); Prince of Wales (1471–1483), Duke of Cornwall (1471–1483), later King Edward V	Edward of Middleham (c. 1473–1484); Prince of Wales (1483–1484), Duke of Cornwall (1483–1484)
James Stewart (1507–1508); Duke of Rothesay (1507–1508)	Arthur Stewart (1509–1510); Duke of Rothesay (1509–1510)	James (1512–1542); Duke of Rothesay (1512–1513), later King James V of Scots	Henry (1511); Duke of Cornwall (1511)	Edward Tudor (1537–1553); Prince of Wales (1537–1547), Duke of Cornwall (1537–1547), later King Edward VI
James Stewart (1540–1541); Duke of Rothesay (1540–1541)	Mary, Queen of Scots (1542–1587)
James Charles Stuart (1566–1625); Duke of Rothesay (1566–1567), later King James VI/I
Henry Frederick Stuart (1594–1612); Prince of Wales (1610–1612), Duke of Cornwall (1603–1612), Duke of Rothesay (1594–1612)	Elizabeth Stuart (1596–1662)	Charles Stuart (1600–1649); Prince of Wales (1616–1625), Duke of Cornwall (1612–1625), Duke of Rothesay (1612–1625), later King Charles I
Sophia of Hanover (1630–1714)	Charles James (1629); Duke of Cornwall (1629), Duke of Rothesay (1629), styled Prince of Wales	Charles Stuart (1630–1685); Prince of Wales (c. 1638/1641–1649), Duke of Cornwall (1630–1649), Duke of Rothesay (1630–1649), later King Charles II	King James II/VII (1633–1701)
King George I (1660–1727)
George Augustus (1683–1760); Prince of Wales (1714–1727), Duke of Cornwall (1714–1727), Duke of Rothesay (1714–1727), later King George II	James Francis Edward Stuart (1688–1766); Prince of Wales (c. 1688–1688), Duke of Cornwall (1688–1702), Duke of Rothesay (1688–1702)
Frederick Louis (1707–1751); Prince of Wales (1729–1751), Duke of Cornwall (1727–1751), Duke of Rothesay (1727–1751)
George William Frederick (1738–1820); Prince of Wales (1751–1760), later King George III
George Augustus Frederick (1762–1830); Prince of Wales (1762–1820), Duke of Cornwall (1762–1820), Duke of Rothesay (1762–1820), later King George IV	Edward Augustus (1767–1820); Duke of Kent and Strathearn
Queen Victoria (1819–1901)
Albert Edward (1841–1910); Prince of Wales (1841–1901), Duke of Cornwall (1841–1901), Duke of Rothesay (1841–1901), later King Edward VII
George Frederick Ernest Albert (1865–1936); Prince of Wales (1901–1910), Duke of Cornwall (1901–1910), Duke of Rothesay (1901–1910), later King George V
Edward Albert Christian George Andrew Patrick David (1894–1972); Prince of Wales (1910–1936), Duke of Cornwall (1910–1936), Duke of Rothesay (1910–1936), later King Edward VIII, later Duke of Windsor	King George VI (1895–1952)
Queen Elizabeth II (1926–2022)
Charles Philip Arthur George (b. 1948); Prince of Wales (1958–2022), Duke of Cornwall (1952–2022), Duke of Rothesay (1952–2022), later King Charles III
William Arthur Philip Louis (b. 1982); Prince of Wales (since 2022), Duke of Cornwall (since 2022), Duke of Rothesay (since 2022), Duke of Cambridge
Prince George of Wales (b. 2013)

== See also ==
- Earl of Orkney
- Ayrshire (Earl of Carrick's Own) Yeomanry
- Duchy of Cornwall
