= Marjorie, Countess of Carrick =

Scottish noble (died 1292)

Marjorie of Carrick
- suo jure 3rd Countess of Carrick
- Died: shortly before 9 November 1292
- Noble family: Clan MacDuff (by marriage); House of Bruce (by marriage)
- Spouses: Adam of Kilconquhar; Robert de Brus, 6th Lord of Annandale
- Issue: Martha of Kilconquhar; Isabel, Queen of Norway; Christina Bruce; Robert I, King of Scotland; Neil de Brus; Edward, King of Ireland; Mary, Lady Campbell, Lady Fraser; Margaret, Lady Carlyle; Sir Thomas de Brus; Alexander de Brus; Elizabeth, Lady Dishington; Matilda, Countess of Ross
- Father: Niall, Earl of Carrick
- Mother: Margaret Stewart

See also Marjorie Bruce, her granddaughter.

Marjorie, Marjory or Marsaili of Carrick (also called Margaret; died before 9 November 1292) was Countess of Carrick, Scotland, from 1256 to 1292, and is notable as the mother of Robert the Bruce.

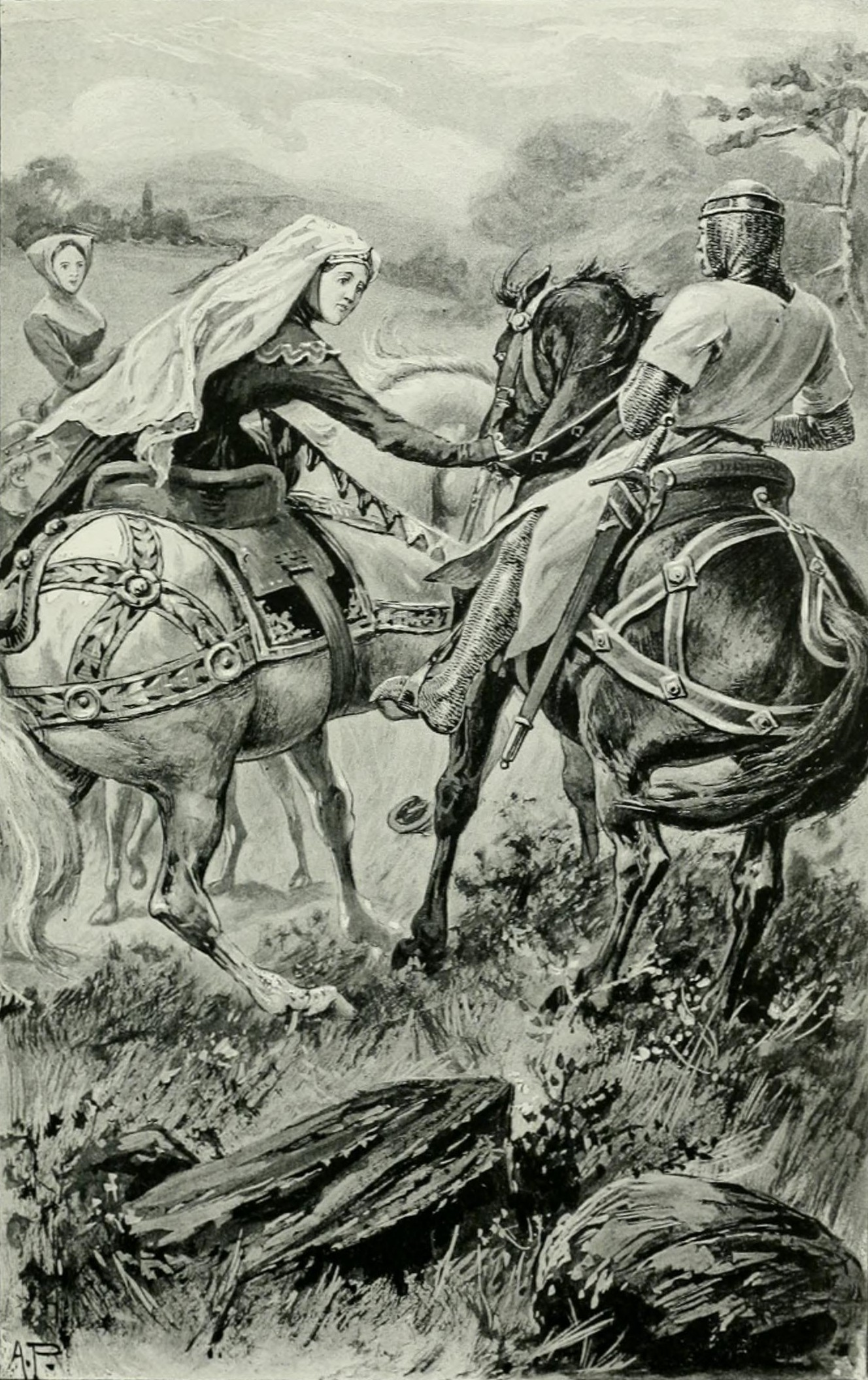
The Countess of Carrick takes Robert de Brus, 6th Lord of Annandale captive and forces him to marry her (1894 illustration, Alfred Pearse)

== Life ==
Marjorie was the daughter and heiress of Niall, 2nd Earl of Carrick, and his wife and cousin Margaret Stewart. Her mother's parents were Walter Stewart, 3rd High Steward of Scotland, and wife Bethóc or Beatrix Mac Gille Críst of Angus. Her father Niall was the head of their clan; having no sons, in 1255 he transferred the title of clan chieftain to his nephew Roland, and upon Niall's death in 1256, Marjorie succeeded him to become the 3rd Countess of Carrick in her own right. Marjorie married Adam of Kilconquhar, who died during the Eighth Crusade in 1271. Marjorie and Adam had one child before his death, Martha. Then, as the story goes, a handsome young man arrived one day to tell her of her husband's death in the Holy Land. He was Robert de Brus, 6th Lord of Annandale, and he had been a companion-in-arms of Adam of Kilconquhar. Marjorie was so taken with him that she had him held captive until he agreed to marry her at Turnberry Castle in 1271. They married without permission of the king, however, and as a result she lost her lands temporarily until they paid a large fine. Robert became Earl of Carrick jure uxoris (in right of his wife). Their children were:

1. Isabel Bruce (1272–1358), married King Eric II of Norway.
2. Christina Bruce, married
  1. Sir Christopher Seton
  2. Sir Andrew Murray
3. King Robert the Bruce.
4. Niall or Nigel Bruce, executed 1306 in Berwick-upon-Tweed, Northumberland, England.
5. Edward Bruce.
6. Sir Thomas Bruce, executed 1307 in Carlisle, England.
7. Alexander Bruce, executed 1307 in Carlisle, England.
8. Mary Bruce, married
  1. Sir Niall Campbell
  2. Sir Alexander Fraser of Touchfraser and Cowie.
9. Matilda Bruce, married Hugh, Earl of Ross
10. Elizabeth Bruce, married William Dishington
11. Margaret Bruce, married William Carlyle

Margaret Bruce who married Sir William de Carlyle is thought by Barrow not to be their daughter. It is speculated that Thomas Randolph, 1st Earl of Moray was the son of Marjorie's daughter, Martha, from her first marriage with Adam. It is put forward as an explanation of why Thomas Randolph was described as a nephew of Robert the Bruce. There is evidence that an "eldest daughter" married into the family of the earls of Mar, giving rise to the now discounted first marriage of Christina to the son of the earl, Gartnait.

Marjorie died before November 1292, at which time her husband transferred Carrick to their eldest son, Robert.

== Sources ==
- Scott, Ronald McNair. Robert the Bruce: King of Scots

Preceded by Níall	Countess of Carrick; 1256–1292	Succeeded by Robert
