= Robert Bruce, Earl of Carrick =

Robert Bruce, Earl of Carrick may refer to:

- Robert de Brus, jure uxoris Earl of Carrick (1243–1304), Scottish nobleman
- Robert I of Scotland (1274–1329), his son, who was Earl of Carrick before becoming King of Scots
