= Alexander Fraser of Touchfraser and Cowie =

Scottish nobleman (died 1332)

Coat of arms of Fraser of Touchfraser and Cowie

Alexander Fraser of Touchfraser and Cowie (died 11 August 1332) was a member of the Scottish nobility who served as the Lord Chamberlain of Scotland and also as the Sheriff of Stirling and Sheriff of Kincardine. He was a descendant of the Clan Fraser members deriving from Oliver Castle. Alexander died at the Battle of Dupplin Moor.

== Life ==
Alexander was the son of Andrew Fraser of Touchfraser and Beatrix le Chen and the grandson of Richard Fraser of Touchfraser. He was the Lord Chamberlain of Scotland between 1325 and 1329.

== Lands ==
On 1 November 1315, the baronial House of Strachan was disinherited by Robert de Bruce, who granted the barony of Strachan to his ardent supporter, Sir Alexander Fraser. King Robert the Bruce also conferred vast lands including the Barony of Cowie, Barony of Cluny and Barony of Kinnaird upon Alexander Fraser, who was his chamberlain at least as late as 1319. The major transport routes over these lands in the Middle Ages were two ancient trackways known as the Elsick Mounth and Causey Mounth.

== Family ==
He married in c.1316 Mary, widow of Sir Nigel Campbell, the daughter of Sir Robert de Brus, 6th Lord of Annandale and Marjorie, Countess of Carrick and had the following known issue:

- John of Touchfraser, whose daughter and heiress Margaret married William Keith, 12th Marischal of Scotland.
- William of Cowie and Durris, killed at Neville's Cross in 1346.

== See also ==
- Cowie Castle
- Muchalls Castle
