= Edward Bruce =

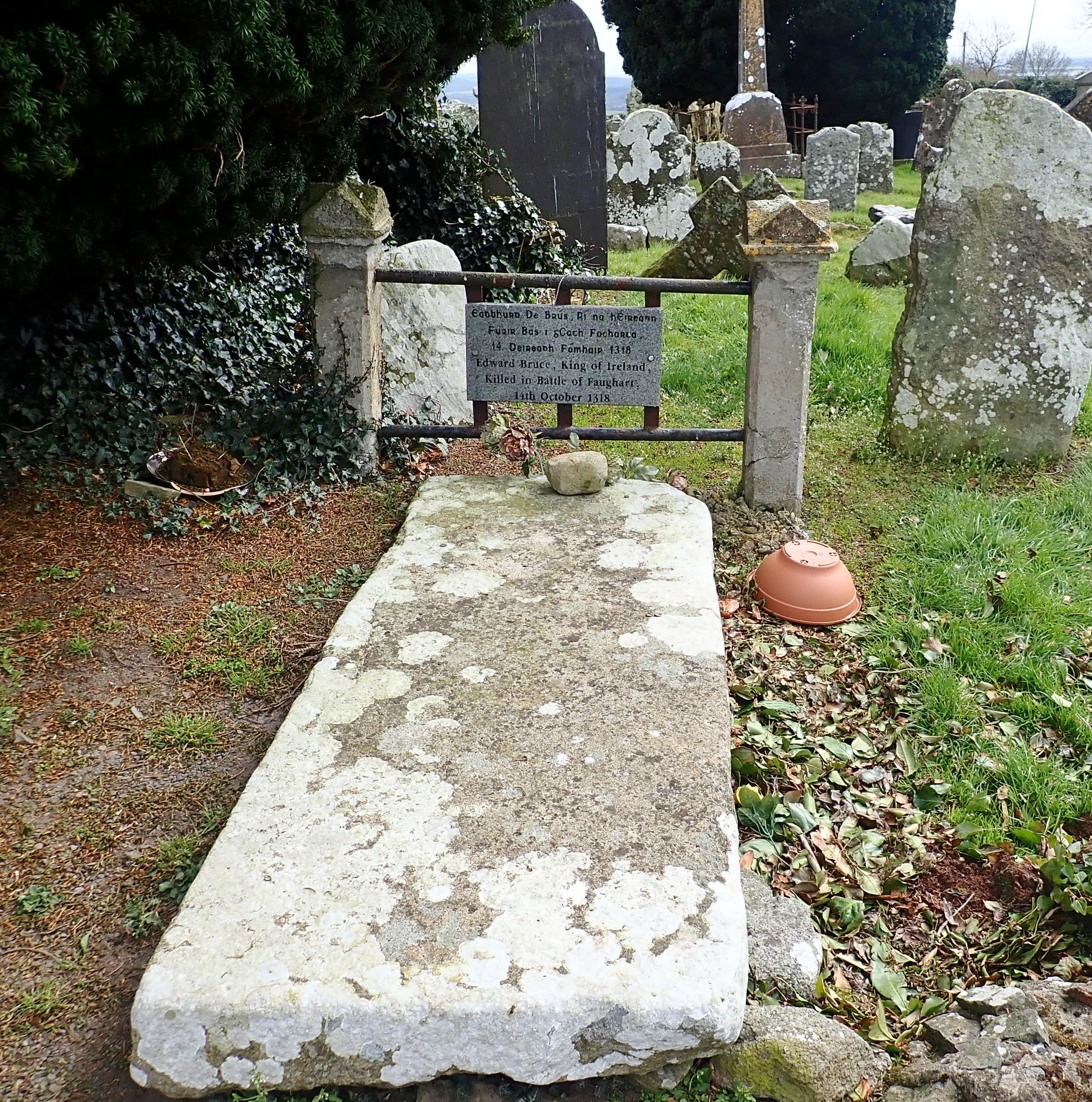
- Grave of King Edward de Bruce, located in Faughart cemetery

High King of Ireland
- Reign: 1315–1318
- Predecessor: Brian Ua Néill
- Born: c. 1280; Scotland
- Died: 14 October 1318; Faughart, County Louth
- Issue: Alexander de Brus, Earl of Carrick (illegitimate)
- Dynasty: Bruce
- Father: Robert de Brus, 6th Lord of Annandale
- Mother: Marjorie, Countess of Carrick

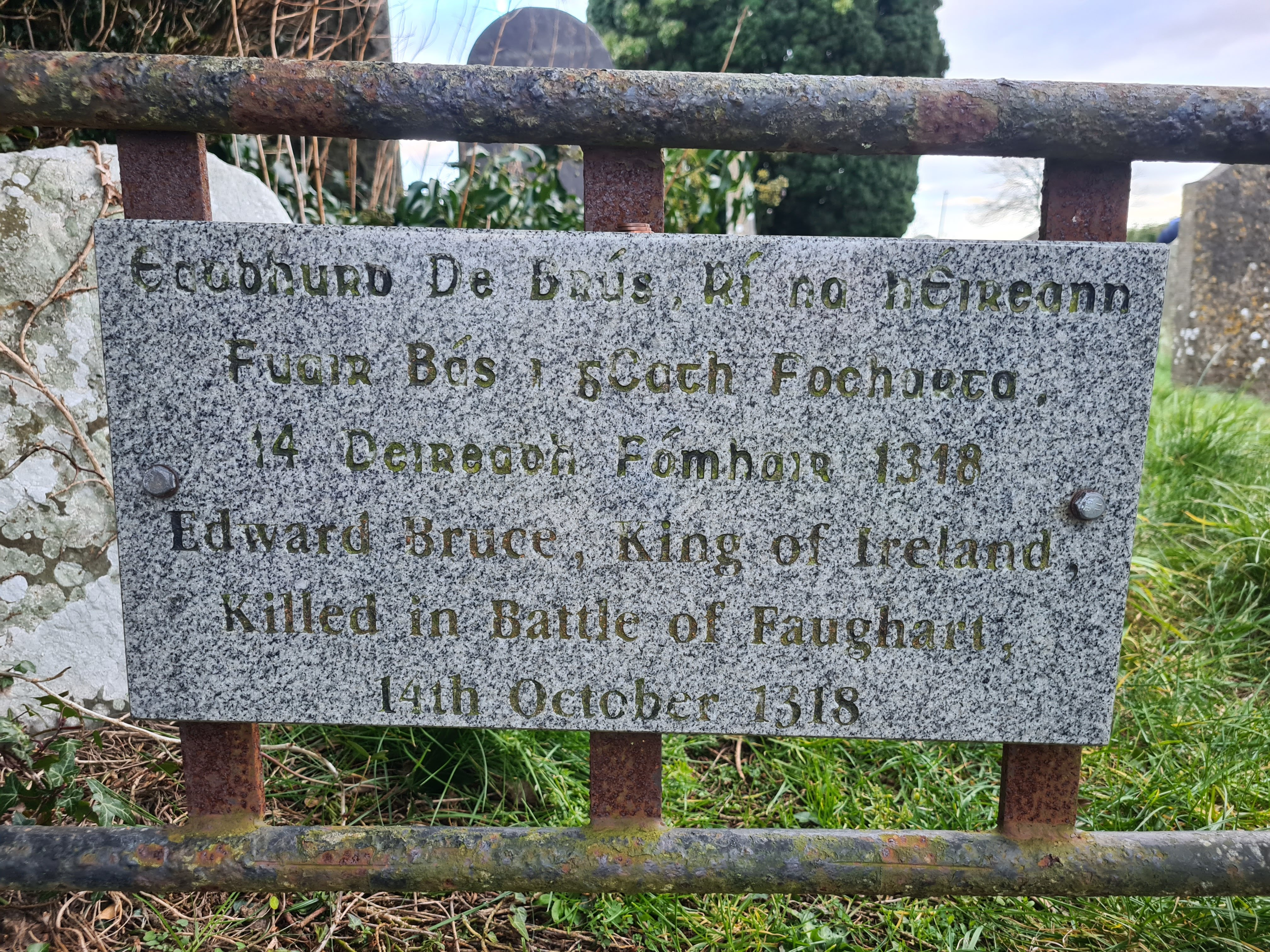
Edward Bruce's grave stone, Old Faughart graveyard

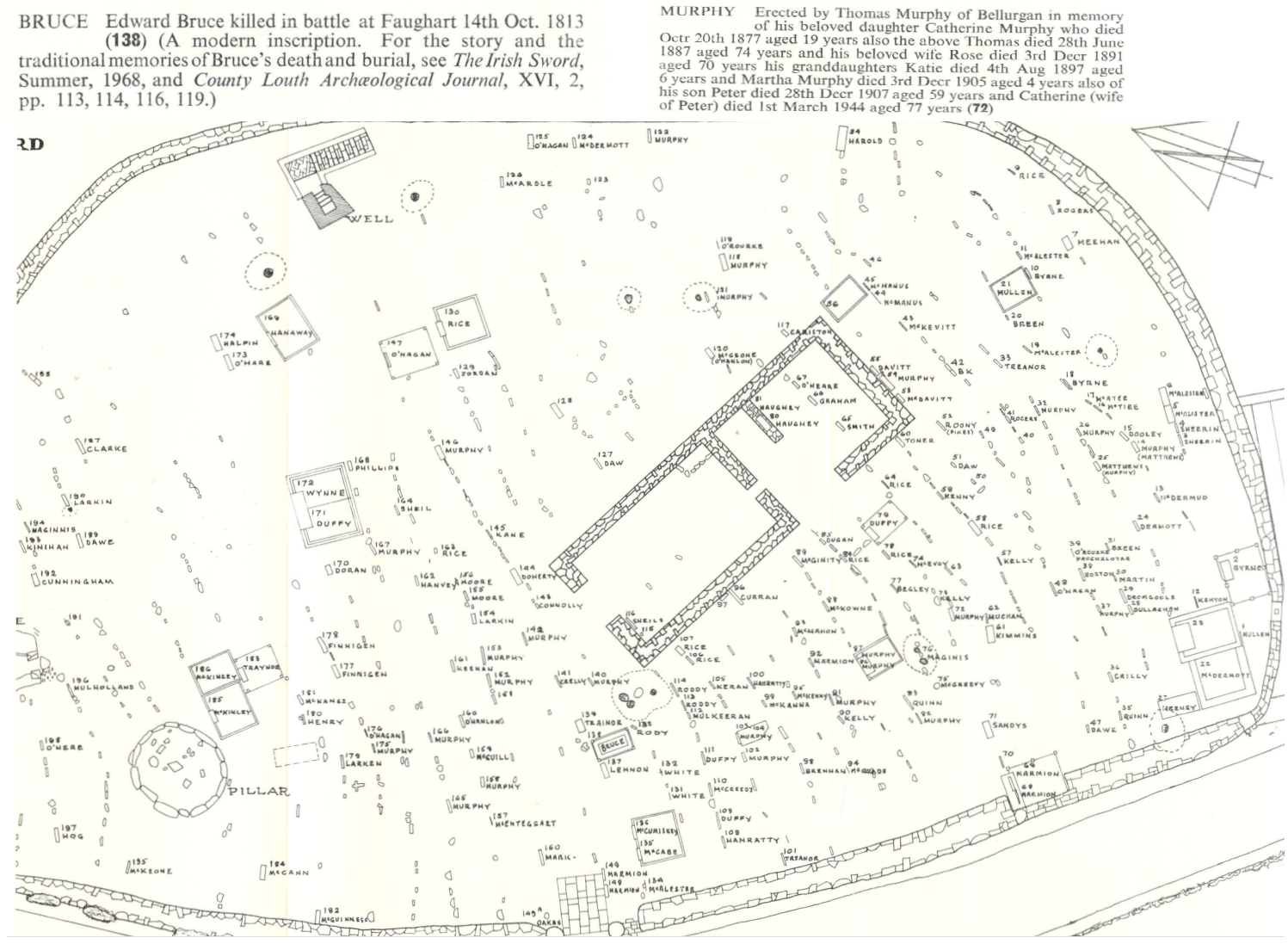
Old Faughart graveyard map

Edward Bruce, Earl of Carrick (Norman French: Edward de Brus; Middle Irish: Edubard a Briuis; Modern Scottish Gaelic: Scottish Gaelic: Eideard or Iomhair Bruis; c. 1280 – 14 October 1318), was a younger brother of Robert the Bruce, King of Scots. He supported his brother in the 1306–1314 struggle for the Scottish crown, then pursued his own claims in Ireland. Proclaimed High King of Ireland in 1315 and crowned in 1316, he was eventually defeated and killed by Anglo-Irish forces of the Lordship of Ireland at the Battle of Faughart in County Louth in 1318.

Arms of Edward Bruce

== Early life ==
Edward was one of five sons of Robert de Brus and Marjorie, Countess of Carrick, but the order is uncertain. Robert the Bruce was the eldest; in the past there was some dispute over whether Edward was second, or third behind Nigel, but one recent account has him fourth behind Nigel and Alexander. His date of birth is unknown, but it was probably not very long after Robert was born in 1274; he was old enough to be fighting in 1307 and to be given an independent command not long after. The Irish medievalist Seán Duffy suggests that he was probably fostered in Ireland as a child, likely by the O'Neills of Ulster, while Archie Duncan suggests some period of time spent with the Bissetts of the Glens of Antrim. This was a common Scottish and Irish cultural practice, and would tie in with, and perhaps explain, parts of his later life.

Edward fought alongside Robert throughout his struggle for the Scottish throne, including his desperate period on the run and as a guerrilla. The three younger Bruce brothers Nigel, Thomas and Alexander were all captured and executed by the English during this period, but Edward survived. As Marjorie the only child of Robert had also been captured by English, Edward was apparently heir to Robert.

== Campaigning against the Comyns ==
After his defeat at the Battle of Barra in May 1308, King Robert's men chased the forces of rival John Comyn, Earl of Buchan as far as Fyvie Castle. As this was a strong fortress, the pursuit ended there. Robert then commanded Edward to lay waste to the Earldom of Buchan, from end to end, including all the castles and strongholds, principally Slains Castle, Rattray Castle and Dundarg Castle as well as the castles that were in English hands such as Fyvie Castle and Aberdeen Castle. At some point after his defeat at Barra, John Comyn fled Scotland for England.

Edward de Bruce proceeded for several months to harry Buchan and kill those who resisted King Robert's rule, homesteads destroyed, livestock slaughtered, stores of grain destroyed, and reducing the castles. By destroying the Comyns' power base, King Robert prevented any possible chance of future violent hostility towards his rule. There is no trustworthy account of the Harrying of Buchan, but it was undoubtedly a prolonged and fiercely contested campaign.

== Later campaigns in Scotland ==
Edward then played an important role in capturing and slighting English-held castles in southwest Scotland, including Rutherglen Castle which he successfully recaptured from the English in 1313. It was he who made a possibly ill-judged pact with the English governor of Stirling Castle, which led to the English sending a large army to relieve the castle. This led to the Battle of Bannockburn on 23–24 June 1314, where he commanded a Scottish schiltrom.

Some time between 1309 and 1313, Edward was created Earl of Carrick, a title previously held by his maternal grandfather Niall of Carrick, his mother and his elder brother.

== Family life ==
In 1317 he was granted dispensation by the Pope to marry Isabella daughter of William, Earl of Ross, although it is doubtful that the marriage took place. He did have an illegitimate son, Alexander Bruce, who would later inherit his father's earldom. Alexander's mother was Isabella, daughter of John of Strathbogie, 9th Earl of Atholl.

== The invasion of Ireland ==
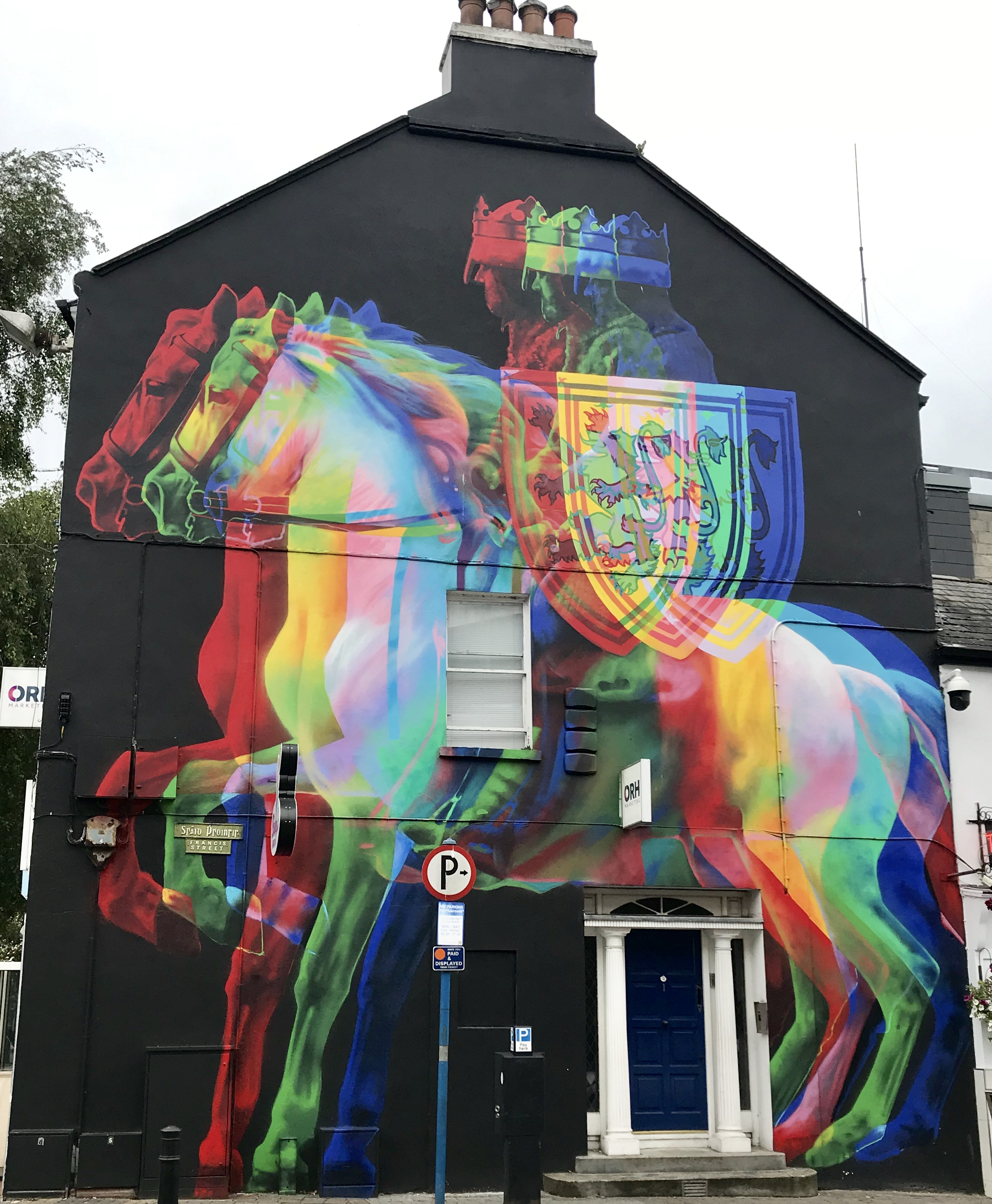
Mural of Edward Bruce in Dundalk, Ireland

=== Historical background ===
By the early 14th century, Ireland had not had a recognised High King since Ruaidrí mac Tairrdelbach Ua Conchobair (Rory O'Connor), who had been deposed by his son in 1186. The country was divided between Irish dynasties and Anglo-Irish lords, each ruling separate parts of Ireland. (In 1258 some of the dynasties and clans had elected Brian Ua Neill to the position of High King; however, he was defeated and killed by the Normans at the Battle of Downpatrick in 1260.)

As a descendant of Aoife MacMurrough (died 1188), Edward could also claim extensive royal Gaelic Irish ancestry that included Brian Boru (High King from 1002 to 1014) and Dermot MacMurrough (King of Leinster from 1126 to 1171); and also the Hiberno-Norse king Olaf Cuaran (died 980). (The Bruce brothers also descended from the kings/lords of Galloway, who were themselves a branch of the same kings of Mann and the Isles which produced Somerled (died 1164), progenitor of Clan Donald, Clan Dougall and Clan Ruari.)

Edward's main mission in invading Ireland involved opening a second front in Scotland's ongoing war against England and depriving the English of much-needed men, materials and finance by causing havoc in Ireland. This became critical when English-backed Scots recaptured the Isle of Man from King Robert's control in January 1315, thereby threatening the south and south-west of Scotland and also reopening up a potential channel of aid to the English from the Anglo-Irish and native Irish.

In addition, Domhnall mac Briain Ó Néill, the king of Tír Eóghain in present-day Ulster, asked for assistance. Ó Néill had been troubled by Anglo-Irish incursions into Tír Eógain from the south-east (the de Verdons), the east (tenants of the earl of Ulster) and the west (also by the earl of Ulster). In order to retain his lands, he and some twelve of his vassals and allies jointly requested aid from Scotland. The Bruce brothers agreed, on condition of Irish support for Edward as King of Ireland—the brothers envisaged themselves as separate rulers of Scotland and Ireland, while Robert would regain Man and Edward would possibly make an attack, with Welsh support, on English-controlled Wales.

Ó Néill approved of the conditions for himself and on behalf of his vassals, and preparations began. At about this point, Roger Mortimer, 1st Earl of March, received news from Irish sources that an invasion was about to take place, and made his way to Ireland where he held land, mainly in and around the castle and town of Trim. (He had previously fought against the Bruces at Bannockburn where he was taken prisoner and freed to return King Edward II's royal seal, lost in the rout.)

On 26 April 1315 a Scottish parliament met at Ayr (just across the North Channel from Antrim). As King Robert did not yet have any legitimate male heir, Edward was proclaimed his legal heir and successor as King of Scotland and to all other titles in case of Robert's death. Edward's invasion fleet also mustered there, having received calls to assemble as early as the previous month.

=== Arrival and the Campaign of 1315 ===
On 26 May 1315 Edward and his fleet (estimated at in excess of 6,000 men) landed on the Irish coast at points at and between Olderfleet Castle at Larne, and Glendrum. His brother had sailed from Tarbert for the Western Isles with his son-in-law, Walter Stewart, to subjugate them till "all the isles, great and small, were brought to his will." Edward meanwhile was swiftly faced by an army led by vassals of the Earl of Ulster such as the de Mandevilles, Savages, Logans and Bissets of the Glens, and their Irish allies, led by Sir Thomas de Mandeville. However, they were defeated in battle by the Scots under Thomas Randolph. Subsequently, the Scots managed to take the town, though not the castle, of Carrickfergus.

In early June, Ó Néill and some twelve fellow northern kings and lords met Edward at Carrickfergus and swore fealty to him as King of Ireland. The Irish annals state that de Brus "took the hostages and lordship of the whole province of Ulster without opposition and they consented to him being proclaimed King of Ireland and all the Gaels of Ireland agreed to grant him lordship and they called him King of Ireland." In fact, de Brus was never to receive anything more than purely nominal recognition from any of the more powerful Irish kings, and despite entreaties at various times over the next three years, was ignored by those whom he did not directly interest. He did, however, directly or indirectly rule much of eastern and mid-Ulster.

In late June, Edward proceeded with his army from Carrickfergus along Magh Line (Six Mile Water), burning Rathmore, near Antrim town, which was a holding of the Savages. He then went south by way of the Moiry Pass; called "Innermallan"/"Enderwillane"/Imberdiolan" in contemporary accounts, between Newry and Dundalk. This ancient routeway had been for centuries the passage south out of Ulster into the Kingdom of Mide, Leinster and Munster but because of its narrowness Ulster armies had frequently ambushed and been ambushed at the pass. Here he was met by Mac Duilechain of Clanbrassil and Mac Artain of Iveagh, both of whom had submitted to him at Carrickfergus. Their attempted ambush ended in their defeat and the army pressed on, destroying de Verdon's fortress of Castle Roche, and on 29 June attacked Dundalk. The town, another possession of the de Verdons, was almost totally destroyed with its population, both Anglo-Irish and Gaelic, massacred alike.

In July, two separate armies opposing Edward met and assembled at Sliabh Breagh, the high ground south of Ardee. One was led out of Connacht by Richard Óg de Burgh, 2nd Earl of Ulster and his ally, the king of Connacht, Felim mac Aedh Ua Conchobair. The second consisted of forces raised in Munster and Leinster by Justiciar, Sir Edmund Butler of Ormonde (father of James Butler, 1st Earl of Ormond). The Scots-Irish army was located at Inniskeen, ten miles north. In between Sliabh Breagh and Inniskeen was the village of Louth. De Burgh moved his army north of Louth and set up camp while his cousin, William Liath de Burgh attempted to ambush Edward's forces. While some skirmishing did result in a number of Scots deaths, Edward refused to give battle and instead, with the Ó Néill, retreated northwards to Coleraine via Armagh. Edward and Domhnall Ó Néill sacked and burned Coleraine, threw down the bridge over the river Bann and faced off de Burgh's pursuing army on the opposite bank. While both sides now were experiencing shortages of food and supplies, de Brus and Ó Néill could at least draw support from local lords such as Ó Cathain and Ó Floinn. Mindful of this, de Burgh eventually withdrew back forty miles to Antrim, while Butler had to return to Ormond due to lack of supplies.

In addition to this, Edward sent separate messages both to King Felim and a rival dynast, Cathal Ua Conchobair, promising to support them if they withdrew. Cathal managed to return to Connacht and had himself proclaimed king, leaving Felim with no choice but to return to put down his rebellion. Worse was to follow: de Burgh found himself deprived of not two but three allies and their armies when his kinsman, Walter mac Walter Cattach Burke, deserted back to Connacht at the head of several hundred men, probably to guard his own estates from the upcoming conflict. Thus, when in August Edward and his men crossed the Bann in four ships supplied by Scots sea captain, Thomas Dun, de Burgh retreated still further to Connor, where on either the first or ninth of September a charge by the Scots-Irish led to his defeat. William Liath was captured and taken as hostage to Scotland by Moray who arrived there on 15 September 1315 to raise more troops, "his ships filled with booty". De Burgh retreated back to Connacht, while other Anglo-Irish took refuge in Carrickfergus Castle.

Finally apprised of the seriousness of the situation, Edward II had on 1 September ordered an assembly of the leading Anglo-Irish, which met at Parliament in Dublin in late October, but no decisive action was taken. On 13 November 1315, Edward marched further south via Dundalk where, incredibly, "some gave them the right hand" (a fight), occupied Nobber on 30 November, and advanced to Kells, where he was met by Mortimer. Mortimer had managed to raise a large force consisting both of his Anglo-Irish and Gaelic vassals, in addition to forces of other magnates. At the same time, Edward was reinforced by Moray who had returned from Scotland with around five hundred fresh troops and supplies.

The Battle of Kells followed, with Mortimer being decisively defeated by Edward. Mortimer was forced to retreat to Dublin while his lieutenant, Walter Cusack, held out at Trim. He almost immediately set sail for England to urge Edward II for reinforcements. At the same time, Governor of Ireland (and Bishop of Ely) John Hotham began to take drastic action to defend Dublin from de Brus, such as leveling entire tenements and churches.

After sacking and burning Kells, Edward proceeded to do the same to Granard, Finnea, the Cistercian monastery of Abbeyleix and raided Angaile (Annaly), the lordship of Gaelic lord O Hanely. De Brus spent Christmas at de Verdon's manor of Loughsewdy, consuming its supplies entirely and before leaving, razing it to the ground. The only manors left alone belonged to Irish lords intimidated to join him, or that of a junior branch of the de Lacy family who in an effort to gain lands voluntarily joined him.

=== Famine ===
At first the Irish/Scottish alliance seemed unstoppable as they won battle after battle. In less than a year they had most of Ireland in their control. However, by the beginning of 1317 famine had stricken most of the country making it difficult for Edward to provide food to most of his men. Shortly, King Robert returned to Scotland and management of his own kingdom, but promised more aid and more volunteers to help his brother. For almost a year the Anglo-Norman barons did little to retake any land since the famine made it difficult for either side to provide food to soldiers in the field.

=== Irish kings' Remonstrance of 1317 ===
As rule over Ireland had been offered to the Plantagenets by the papal bull Laudabiliter in 1155, Edward's allies, led by Donall O'Neill, sent a remonstrance to Pope John XXII in 1317. This asked for Laudabiliter to be revoked and informed the Pope that they had chosen Edward as their king:

...we have unanimously established and set him up as our king and lord in our kingdom aforesaid, for in our judgment and the common judgment of men he is pious and prudent, humble and chaste, exceedingly temperate, in all things sedate and moderate, and possessing power (God on high be praised) to snatch us mightily from the house of bondage with the help of God and our own justice, and very willing to render to everyone what is due to him of right, and above all is ready to restore entirely to the Church in Ireland the possessions and liberties...

The Papacy neither recognised Edward's claim, nor agreed with the Remonstrance, and his rule remained de facto over parts of Ireland and never de jure over the whole island.

=== Battle of Faughart ===
Then in the late summer of 1318, Sir John de Bermingham with his army began a march against Edward. On 14 October 1318, the Scots-Irish army was badly defeated at the Battle of Faughart by de Bermingham's forces. Edward was killed, his body being quartered and the parts sent to various towns in Ireland, and his head being delivered to King Edward II. In the Annals of Ulster (erroneously under the year 1315) the hostility towards Edward Bruce among both the Anglo-Irish and Irish alike is evident:

"Edward de Brus, the destroyer of Ireland in general, both Foreigners and Gaels, was killed by the Foreigners of Ireland by dint of fighting at Dun-Delgan. And there were killed in his company Mac Ruaidhri, king of Insi-Gall Hebrides and Mac Domhnaill, king of Argyll, together with slaughter of the Men of Scotland around him. And there was not done from the beginning of the world a deed that was better for the Men of Ireland than that deed. For there came death and loss of people during his time in all Ireland in general for the space of three years and a half and people undoubtedly used to eat each other throughout Ireland."

== Sources ==
- Robert Bruce and the Community of the Realm of Scotland, GWS Barrow, 1976.
- Annals of Ireland 1162–1370 in Britannia by William Camden; ed. Richard Gough, London, 1789.
- Robert the Bruce's Irish Wars: The Invasions of Ireland 1306–1329, Seán Duffy, 2004.
- The Greatest Traitor: The Life of Sir Roger Mortimer, 1st Earl of March, Ian Mortimer, 2004.
- The Wars of the Bruces: Scotland, England and Ireland 1306–1328, Colm McNamee, 1997 ISBN 1-898410-92-5

Edward Bruce House of Bruce Born: c. 1280 Died: 14 October 1318
Regnal titles
Preceded by Brian Ua Neill	High King of Ireland; 1315 – 14 October 1318	
Peerage of Scotland
Preceded by Robert the Bruce	Earl of Carrick; 1315–1318	Succeeded by David
