= Marjorie Bruce =

Scottish princess (c. 1296 – 1316/17)

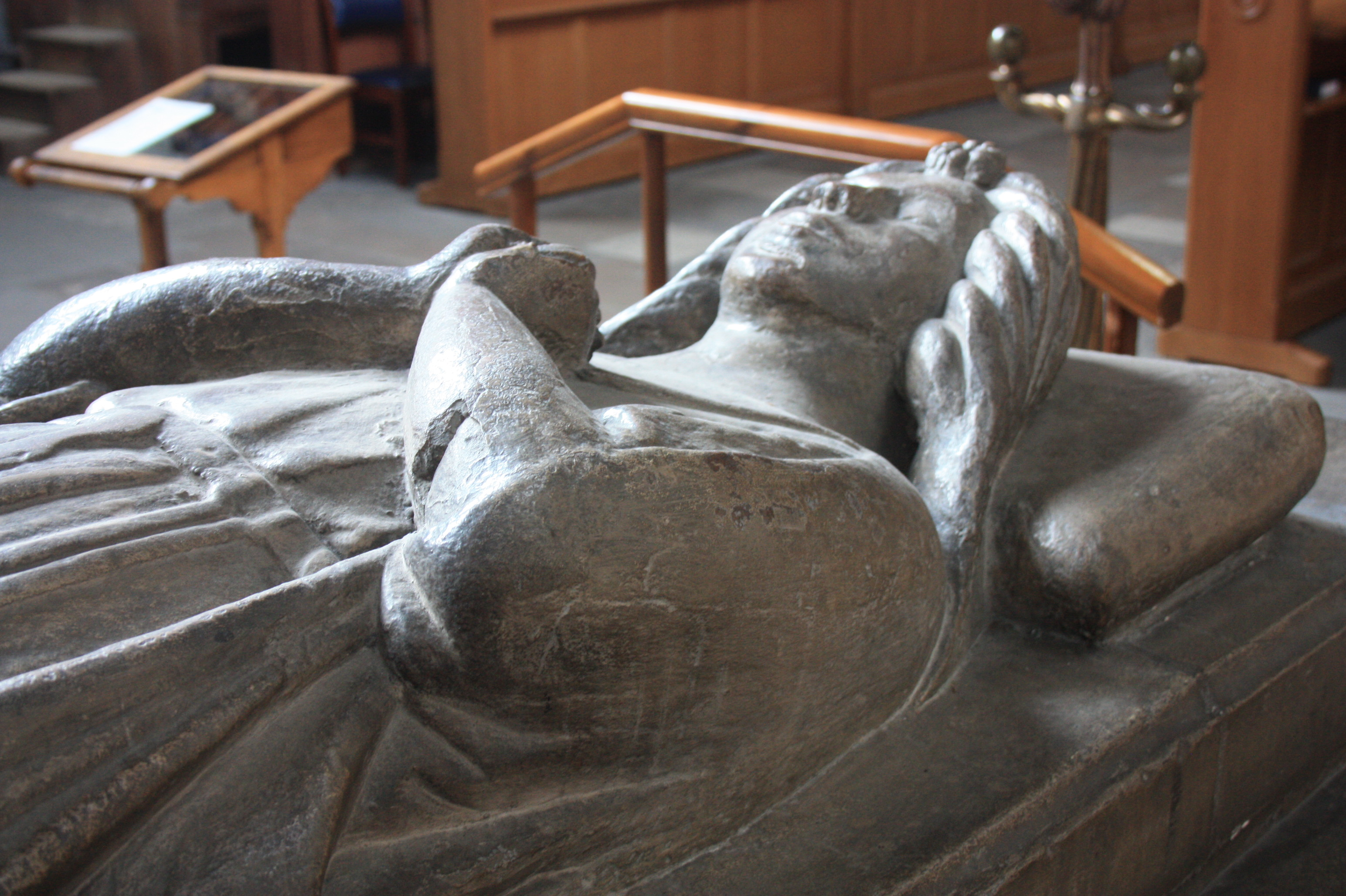
- Effigy of Marjorie Bruce at Paisley Abbey
- Born: 1296
- Died: 1316 or 1317 (aged 20-21)
- Burial: Paisley Abbey
- Spouse: Walter Stewart, 6th High Steward of Scotland (m. 1315)
- Issue: Robert II of Scotland
- House: Bruce
- Father: Robert the Bruce
- Mother: Isabella of Mar

Marjorie Bruce or Marjorie de Brus (c. 1296 – 1316 or 1317) was the eldest daughter of Robert the Bruce, King of Scots, and the only child born of his first marriage with Isabella of Mar.

Marjorie's marriage to Walter, High Steward of Scotland, gave rise to the House of Stewart. Her son was the first Stewart monarch, King Robert II of Scotland.

== Early life ==
Her mother, Isabella, was a noblewoman from the Clan Mar. Marjorie was named after her father's mother, Marjorie, Countess of Carrick. Soon after giving birth to Marjorie, at the age of 19, Isabella died. Marjorie's father was at that time the Earl of Carrick.

According to legend, Marjorie's parents had been very much in love, and Robert the Bruce did not remarry until 1302 (six years after his first wife's death), to a courtier named Elizabeth de Burgh.

On 27 March 1306, her father was crowned King of Scots at Scone, Perthshire.

== Imprisonment ==
Three months after the coronation, in June, 1306, her father was defeated at the Battle of Methven. He sent his wife, two sisters, and Marjorie north with his supporter Isabella MacDuff, Countess of Buchan, but by the end of June they were captured by Uilleam II, Earl of Ross, a Balliol supporter, who handed them over to the English.

As punishment, Edward I of England sent his hostages to different places in England. Marjorie was sent to the convent at Watton. Her aunt, Christina Bruce, was sent to another convent. Elizabeth de Burgh was placed under house arrest at a manor house in Yorkshire. Elizabeth de Burgh's punishment was lighter than the others. This is due to the fact that Edward I needed the support of her father, the powerful Earl of Ulster. Marjorie's aunt, Mary Bruce, and the Countess of Buchan were imprisoned in wooden cages, exposed to public view, at Roxburgh Castle and Berwick Castle, respectively.

For the next four years, Elizabeth, Christina, Mary, and Isabella endured solitary confinement. The latter two experienced daily public humiliation. A cage was built for Marjorie, who was around the age of 12, at the Tower of London, but Edward I reconsidered. He instead sent her to the Gilbertine convent in Watton. Christopher Seton, Christina's husband, was executed.

Edward I died on 7 July 1307. He was succeeded by his son, Edward II, who subsequently held Marjorie captive in a convent for about seven more years. She was freed in October 1314, in exchange for Humphrey de Bohun, 4th Earl of Hereford captured after the Battle of Bannockburn.

== Marriage and death ==
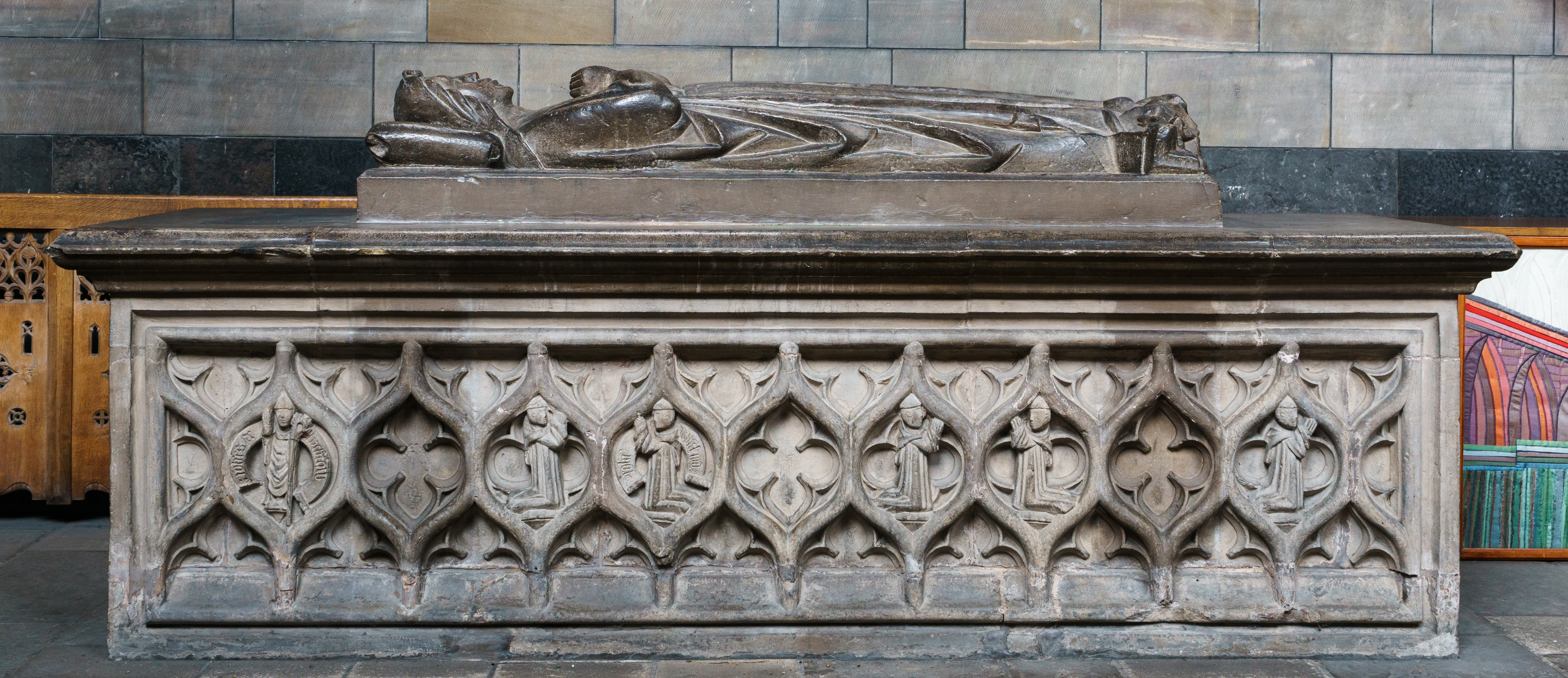
Marjorie's sarcophagus, Paisley Abbey

Upon the liberation of Elizabeth de Burgh and Marjorie from their long captivity in England, Walter Stewart, 6th High Steward of Scotland, was sent to receive them at the Anglo-Scottish border and conduct them back to the Scottish court. In April 1315 Bruce gathered a council in Ayr, and shortly after this Walter Stewart married Marjorie. Her dowry included the Barony of Bathgate in West Lothian.

The traditional story is that on 2 March 1316, Marjorie was riding in Gallowhill, Paisley, Renfrewshire while heavily pregnant. Her horse was suddenly startled and threw her to the ground. She went into premature labour and her child, Robert II of Scotland, was born. Marjorie died soon afterward at the age of around 20, like her mother, who was roughly the same age when she died in childbirth. However, it is not clear that this traditional story is correct; some accounts indicate that she may have survived into 1317. She may still have died in a riding accident, but this could have taken place after the birth of her son. In fact, one source states that she died in October 1317, after falling from a horse, during a second pregnancy. Following the same October 1317 tradition, the Renfrewshire historian Crawford recorded circa 1710 that local tradition reported she was "riding betwixt Pasly and the Castle of Renfrew, then the principal Residence of the Great Stewart of Scotland, her Husband, she was thrown from her Horse, and by the fall suffered a Dislocation of the Vertebrae of her Neck; she, being pregnant, fell in Labour (of King Robert II.) the child or Faetus, as they report, was a Cesar[ian]: The Operation being by an unskilful Hand, his Eye was touch'd by the Instrument, which afterwards proved incurable, from which he was called King Bleareie [ie. bleery eye]; she died upon the Spot: And on the Fatal Place where this Accident happened, there was erected a Cross, yet standing, called Queen Bleareie's Cross." This tradition appears to conflate the dates and facts from other known sources, however authentic references to the sight affliction occurring in infancy, and the related nickname, are lacking.

At the junction of Renfrew Road and Dundonald Road in Paisley, a cairn marks the spot called "the Knock", near where Marjorie reputedly fell from her horse. Bruce Road and Marjorie Drive are named in her honour. She is buried at Paisley Abbey.

Her son succeeded his childless uncle David II of Scotland in 1371 as King Robert II. Her descendants include the House of Stewart (now styled Stuart) and all their successors on the throne of Scotland, England and the United Kingdom.

== Marjorie in fiction ==
The young adult novel Girl in a Cage, by Jane Yolen and Robert J. Harris, features Marjorie Bruce as its protagonist. In it, Marjorie is imprisoned in a cage.

The historical novel Spirit of Fire: The Tale of Marjorie Bruce (2016), by Emmerson Brand, features Marjorie Bruce as its protagonist.

In the historical action drama film Outlaw King (2018), Marjorie is featured as a minor character during the First War of Scottish Independence.

== Commemoration ==
The original site of Bathgate Castle, which was part of her dowry, can be found on the grounds of Bathgate Golf Club. The site is protected by Historic Environment Scotland and the club is barred from carrying out any excavation work on the site without prior permission. Every year on the first Saturday of June, the town of Bathgate celebrates the marriage of Marjorie and Walter in their annual historical pageant, just before the town's Bathgate Procession and Community Festival (formerly Bathgate Procession and John Newland Festival. Local school children are given the parts of Marjorie, Walter, and other members of the court. After the pageant, everyone joins the procession along with Robert the Bruce on horseback.
