= William Dishington =

13th-14th century Scottish noble

William Dishington (died c.1360) was a Scottish noble.

He had charters issued for lands in Balglassie, Aberlemno, and Tollyquhondland by Robert the Bruce. William was known to be an associate of Alexander Ramsay in 1338. He died c. 1360.

== Marriage and issue ==
William married Elizabeth, daughter of Robert de Brus, jure uxoris Earl of Carrick, and Marjorie, Countess of Carrick. They are known to have had the following issue:

- William Dishington of Ardross, married heiress of John Burnard of Ardross.
- John Dishington of Longhermiston.
