= Adam of Kilconquhar =

Scottish noble and crusader (died 1270)

- Born: Probably Kilconquhar in Fife, Scotland
- Died: 1271; Acre, Kingdom of Jerusalem
- Spouse: Marjorie, Countess of Carrick
- Children: Martha, the mother of Thomas Randolph
- Relatives: MacDuff family; the Comyns

Adam of Kilconquhar (died 1271) was a Scottish noble from the 13th century. Of Fife origin, he is notable for becoming the husband of the Countess of Carrick and participating in the Ninth Crusade under the command of Lord Edward, Duke of Gascony (future King Edward I of England).

== Background ==
Evidence indicates that Adam was from the MacDuff family; he was probably the son of Duncan of Kilconquhar, son of Adam (son of Duncan, Earl of Fife), who appears frequently as a witness in the documents of St Andrews Cathedral Priory as Adam frater comitis, i.e. brother of Earl Duncan II. It is likely that Adam's mother was from the Comyn family: his brother William was called 'Comyn' in his papal letter of appointment as bishop of Brechin.

Kilconquhar in south-east Fife was the seat of this family's holdings. The feudal arrangement that evolved in the 12th and 13th centuries was complicated, in that although the Kilconquhar was held of the bishop of St Andrews, the bishop in turn held it from the earl.

== Marriage and crusade ==
Adam appears to have enjoyed the favour of the Scottish king Alexander III, and married Marjorie, daughter and heiress of Niall, Earl of Carrick. He was able to use the title of earl in his wife's name, but it is unlikely that he had much role ruling the province, as Earl Neil had left the position of kindred chief (ceann cineil) to his nephew Lachlan. Their daughter Martha, step-daughter of Robert Bruce, was the mother of Thomas Randolph, Earl of Moray one of the Bruce's closest companions-in-arms.

He died at Acre in 1271, while on crusade. According to material in the Chronicle of John of Fordun, he had been a participant in the Eighth Crusade. He had been one of a small Scottish contingent that attacked Tunis in 1270, where fellow-Scot and fellow-MacDuff David, Earl of Atholl died. Adam survived, and withdrew with the rest to winter in Sicily. The following spring the contingent joined with the army of Lord Edward and proceeded to Acre, where Adam was taken by disease. Adam's widow Marjorie went on to marry her husband's companion-in-arms Robert de Brus, 6th Lord of Annandale
