= Alexander Bruce, Earl of Carrick =

Scottish royal

Alexander Bruce
- Earl of Carrick
- Died: 19 July 1333; Halidon Hill, Kingdom of Scotland
- Family: Bruce
- Spouse: Eleanora Douglas
- Issue: Eleanor de Brus
- Father: Edward Bruce
- Mother: Isabella of Atholl

Alexander Bruce, Earl of Carrick (died 19 July 1333) was an illegitimate son of Edward Bruce, Earl of Carrick, younger brother of King Robert the Bruce, and Isabella, daughter of John of Strathbogie, 9th Earl of Atholl. According to The Brus they were married, but The Scots Peerage points out that this is unlikely because he did not immediately inherit his father's lands and titles; Freedom's Sword also says he was illegitimate.

He played an ambiguous role during Edward Balliol's first invasion of Scotland. He fought for the Bruce loyalists at the Battle of Dupplin Moor. He then joined the Balliol side, and was captured by the Bruce loyalists and nearly killed at the Battle of Annan. He rejoined the Bruce loyalist side and was killed fighting for King David II at the Battle of Halidon Hill.

Alexander was the first husband of Eleonora Douglas, daughter of Sir Archibald Douglas, Guardian of Scotland, and sister of William Douglas, 1st Earl of Douglas. They had a daughter, Eleanor de Brus, who reputedly married Sir William de Cunynghame of Kilmaurs and had issue.
