= Andrew Crawford (knight) =

Arms of Crawford of Loudon. Gules, a fess ermine

Andrew Crawford was a Scottish knight during the 13th-14th century.

His parentage is not clear and his daughters upon his death were placed by King John of Scotland into guardianship of Robert Keith, Marischal of Scotland, however it would seem that the Campbells of Loch Awe had the daughters under guardianship in dispute. This was contested in the English courts.

== Family and issue ==
Andrew is known to have had the following known issue;

- Susanna, married Duncan Campbell (d.1367), passing the Barony of Loudon into the Campbell family; had issue.
- Alice, married Neil Campbell (d.1316); had issue.
