= William Carlyle =

13th-14th century Scottish noble

William Carlyle (Note: Also William of Carlisle) (died 1329) was a Scottish noble. He was the son of William Carlyle and Sapientia.

After his father died in 1274, he inherited lands in Carleil, Cumquintin, Kynmount, Crunyanton, & Petenain in Scotland and Kirk Bampton, Uchtridby, Ormsby, Wortwell, Redenhall, Malton, Appelgarth, & Bayton in England.

== Marriage and issue ==
William married Margaret, daughter of Robert de Brus, jure uxoris Earl of Carrick, and Marjorie, Countess of Carrick, they are known to have had the following issue:

- John Carlyle
- William Carlyle
- Thomas Carlyle
- James Carlyle
