= Neil de Brus =

Scottish noble

Neil de Brus (c. 1279 – September 1306), also Niall or Nigel, was a younger brother of King Robert I of Scotland. Born at Carrick, Ayrshire, Scotland, he was a son of Robert de Brus, 6th Lord of Annandale and Margaret, Countess of Carrick. He supported his older brother in the struggle for the crown of Scotland and fought in the Wars of Scottish Independence.

In 1306, he was captured by English forces at Kildrummy Castle, where he and his garrison held off Edward's forces who had been seeking Robert the Bruce's wife Elizabeth, daughter Marjorie, sisters Mary and Christina, and Isabella MacDuff, Countess of Buchan. Their actions enabled the women to escape, although the women were soon captured and betrayed to the English by William, 3rd Earl of Ross, in the chapel of St Duthac at Tain in Ross.

He was executed for high treason by being hanged, drawn, and quartered in September 1306 at Berwick-upon-Tweed.
