= Fiona Watson (historian) =

British historian

Fiona Watson is a Scottish historian and television presenter. She presented the 2001 BBC series In Search of Scotland.

Watson originates from Dunfermline, and now lives in Braco. She obtained her degree in Medieval History from the University of St. Andrews, followed by a PhD from the University of Glasgow. She is a Research Fellow of the University of Dundee, and was the first Director of the Centre for Environmental History at the University of Stirling, where she was a senior lecturer in history. She is also a research consultant at the Centre for History of the University of the Highlands and Islands.

In 2018 she published the book "Traitor, Outlaw, King", in which she presents the case for Robert The Bruce having been born in a village near Chelmsford in England.

== Works ==
- Under the Hammer: Edward I and Scotland, 1296–1305 (1998)
- Scotland: A History, 8000 BC–AD 2000 (2002)
- Scotland from Pre-History to the Present (2003)
- Mar Lodge Woods and People (with Mairi Stewart) (2004)
- Macbeth: a True Story (2010)
- Traitor, Outlaw, King (2018)
