= Mary Bruce =

Sister of Robert the Bruce

Mary Bruce (c. 1282 – 1323) was the younger sister of Robert the Bruce, King of Scots. During the First War of Scottish Independence, she was captured by the English and imprisoned in a cage at Roxburgh Castle for about four years. She was the daughter of Robert de Brus, 6th Lord of Annandale, and Marjorie, Countess of Carrick.

Along with the king's other female relatives (Christina Bruce, Marjorie Bruce, his wife Elizabeth de Burgh and supporter Isabella MacDuff), she was captured and handed over to the English by the Earl of Ross. By order of King Edward I of England, she was then held prisoner in an iron or wooden cage exposed to the public view at Roxburgh Castle. Isabella MacDuff was imprisoned in a similar cage at Berwick Castle. It was unusual for noble women to be imprisoned in cages.

She was transferred to presumably better conditions in 1310. This was not necessarily a humane move; it has been suggested that by this stage Bruce was gaining strength, she was potentially a valuable hostage, and the English did not want her dying of exposure. There was also a high likelihood of her being rescued from Roxburgh.

She was eventually released in 1314, in exchange for English noblemen captured at the Battle of Bannockburn.

== Family ==
She married, firstly, Sir Neil Campbell, one of her brother's loyal supporters, and had the following known issue:

- Iain (or John)
- Dougal
- Duncan (?)

She married, secondly, Alexander Fraser of Touchfraser and Cowie and had the following known issue:

- John of Touchfraser
- William of Cowie and Durris.

== Media representations ==
She was played by Dee Hepburn in the 1996 film The Bruce.
