= Isabella MacDuff, Countess of Buchan =

Scottish noblewoman, figure in the Wars of Scottish Independence

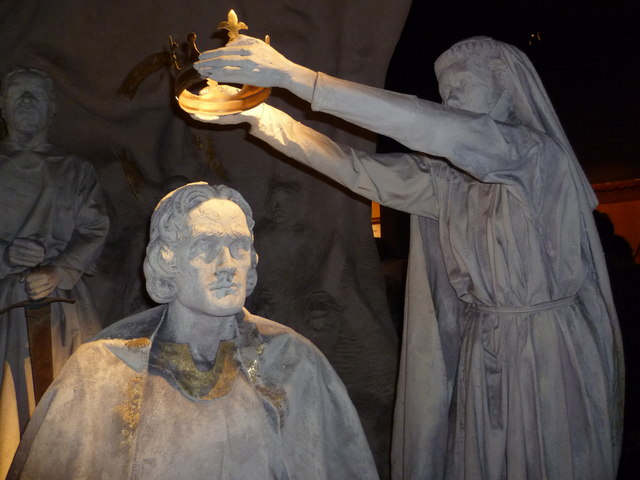
Lady Buchan crowning Robert the Bruce at Scone in 1306; from a modern tableau at Edinburgh Castle.

Isabella MacDuff, Countess of Buchan (probably died c. 1314), was a significant figure in the Wars of Scottish Independence.

She was the daughter of Donnchadh III, Earl of Fife, and Johanna de Clare, daughter of The 6th Earl of Hertford. She was married to John Comyn, 3rd Earl of Buchan, and thus was the Countess of Buchan. After Robert the Bruce killed John III Comyn, Lord of Badenoch, at Greyfriars Kirk in Dumfries, the Earl of Buchan joined the English side in the Scottish Wars of Independence. Isabella took the contrary view.

According to tradition, the ceremony of crowning the monarch was performed by a representative of Clan MacDuff but Isabella, Lady Buchan, arrived at Scone Abbey, near Perth, the day after the coronation of Robert the Bruce in March 1306. However, the Bruce agreed to be crowned for a second time the day after, as otherwise some would see the ceremony as irregular, not being performed by a MacDuff.

Bruce was defeated at the Battle of Methven in June 1306, so he sent Isabella and his female relatives north, but they were betrayed to the English by Uilleam II, Earl of Ross. Edward I of England ordered her sent to Berwick-upon-Tweed with these instructions: "Let her be closely confined in an abode of stone and iron made in the shape of a cross, and let her be hung up out of doors in the open air at Berwick, that both in life and after her death, she may be a spectacle and eternal reproach to travellers."

Lady Buchan was imprisoned in this cage for four years, then moved to the Carmelite friary at Berwick. This was not necessarily a humanitarian move; it is suggested that by this stage Bruce was gaining support, his female relatives were potentially valuable hostages, and the English did not want them to die of ill-treatment. The last clear mention of Lady Buchan is of her being transferred again in 1313, her eventual fate being uncertain. Most of Bruce's female relatives returned to Scotland in early 1315, when they were exchanged for English noblemen captured after the Battle of Bannockburn, but there is no mention of her in the records, so she had probably died by then.

Mary Bruce was treated in a similar fashion at Roxburgh Castle.

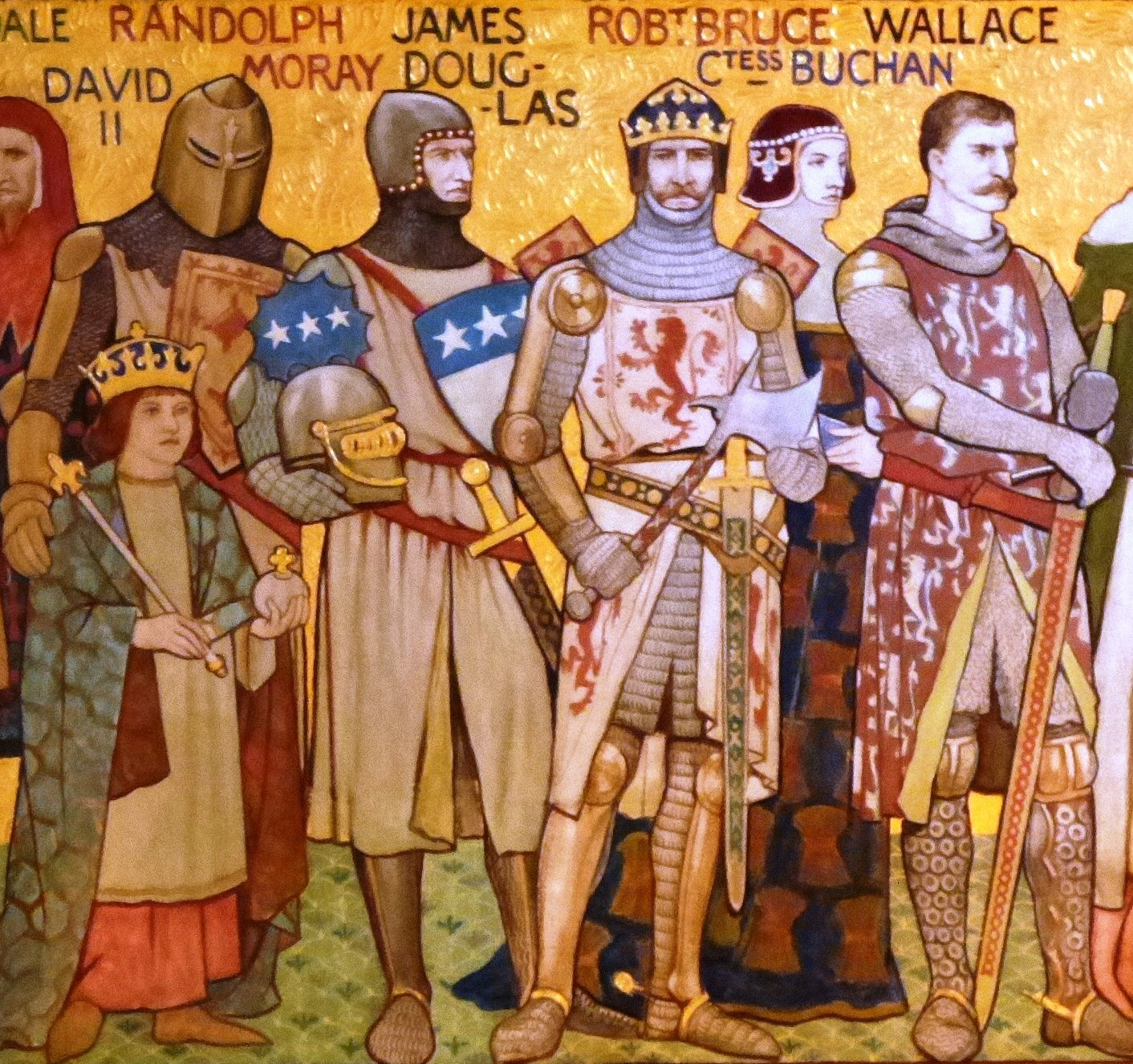
The Countess of Buchan with other War of Independence notables from frieze by William Brassey Hole at the Scottish National Gallery

== Isabella in fiction ==
She is the subject of the novel Kingdom of Shadows by Barbara Erskine and the short story Proud Lady in a Cage by Fred Urquhart. She is also appears as a supporting character in the young adult novel, Girl in a Cage, by Jane Yolen and Robert J. Harris, which focuses on Marjorie Bruce.

She was also the subject of a song Isabel by Steeleye Span (recorded on their album Back in Line) which claims without foundation that she was Bruce's lover (and also gets some chronology confused).

She is a character in Rebel King - Book One - Hammer of the Scots, a series of novels on the Chronicles of Robert the Bruce, by Charles and Carolyn Bruce.

She is also a character in Nigel Tranter's Bruce trilogy, which probably unhistorically has her returning to Scotland after Bannockburn.

She is portrayed in the 2018 Netflix movie Outlaw King by actress Kim Allan.

She is also a character in the series of books written by romance writer Monica McCarty (the Highland Guard Novels). Isabella MacDuff is the main character in the 4th book of the series titled The Viper.

She is a character in the 2011 historical novel The Lion Wakes by Robert Low, described to have a secret love affair with Robert the Bruce.

She is a character in the 2013 historical romance novel A Rose in the Storm by Brenda Joyce. The heroine of the novel (Lady Margaret Comyn) is the fictional niece of Isabella's husband and her friend. Isabella's fate is the same.
