= Neil Campbell (Scottish noble) =

Nobleman in the Scottish war of Independence

Sir Niall mac Cailein (died 1316), also known as Neil Campbell or Nigel Campbell, was a nobleman and warrior who spent his life in the service of King Robert the Bruce. His Gaelic name means "Niall, Colin's son" since he was the son of Cailean Mór. His services to the king elevated the Campbells into the higher ranks of the Scottish nobility.

== Biography ==
=== Master Niall ===
By later Campbell tradition, Niall was the elder son of Cailean Mór; however, contemporary evidence seems to suggest that his brother Domhnall enjoyed this distinction. Niall's earliest appearance in the sources occurs in 1282 on a witness list to a royal charter in favour of Cambuskenneth Abbey. Niall disappears for 20 years, unless the "Master Niall" active in the service of the then Earl of Carrick, Robert, in the 1290s can be identified with Niall mac Cailein. This seems likely, because one official source styles him Mestre Neel Cambell. Another of the sources for "Master Niall" tells us that he came from the "county of Ayr"; this would tie in with the known background of the Campbells of the era, and with Niall's later affiliation with King Robert. In 1293, Niall was sent to Norway to deliver personal items to Robert's sister, Isabella Bruce, Queen of Norway. In 1296, this Master Niall swore fealty to King Edward I of England. Issued with a safe passage through England, on 12 June 1297, to return to Scotland.

=== Wars of Independence ===
The Niall mac Cailein who appears again in the source in 1302 was still in the service of the English crown. Until 1306, he remained on the side of the officially Bruce-backed English regime. Niall served in the warband of Richard Óg de Burgh, 2nd Earl of Ulster and in the "English" army which besieged Stirling Castle in 1305. Niall and his brother Domhnall were rewarded for their services. In 1302, Niall was given lands in Cumberland. In the same year, Niall and his brother Domhnall received the guardianship of the heiresses of Andrew Crawford, lord of the Baronies of Loudoun, Lochmartnaham and Draffan. However, Niall and Domhnall, like their lord the Earl of Carrick, were drifting towards renewing their war against the English conquest. Niall was at Westminster in 1305, because his rights were being challenged by a knight called Robert Keith. In spring 1305, Edward decided in favour of Keith, judging "to allow [Keith] to have these children and to distrain Sir Dovenald Chambel and Sir Nel Chambel by their lands and bodies". In the same year, Edward granted some Campbell lands to an English knight, Sir John Dovedale. Such judgments were both a cause and effect of deteriorating relations with the English crown.

When Robert de Bruce decided to raise the Scottish banner in 1306, it is not surprising that Niall and Domhnall were among the would-be king's first adherents. Niall was present at Scone in March 1306 when Robert was crowned King of Scots. After the defeats Robert suffered at the Battle of Methven and Battle of Dalrigh, Niall was one of the men who remained faithful, as John Barbour testified later in the century. All the evidence suggests that Niall remained in Robert's warband for the years to come, fighting both the English side generally and the MacDougalls in the west of Scotland. Niall also acted as a representative of Bruce in negotiations with the English crown, on two occasions, in 1309 and 1314.

=== Marriage and family ===
Niall married Robert the Bruce's sister, Mary Bruce. The date of their marriage is unknown. Niall and Mary had a son, Iain. Robert granted the couple the lands confiscated from David Strathbogie, almost certainly so that Iain would eventually become the Earl, which is indeed what happened. This was part of a general policy by Robert of redistributing lands and titles to his extended kin. Niall, however, had been married previously to Alyse de Crawford, by whom he had at least two sons, Sir Colin Og Campbell of Lochawe and Dubhghall. In 1315, Robert granted the baronies of Loch Awe and Ardscotnish to Cailean for the service of a 40-oared galley for 40 days per annum. This grant, in the view of the most recent historian of the subject, is the real beginning of the Campbell lordship of Lochawe. In 1326, Robert created the post of sheriff of Argyll, and granted it to Niall's son, Dougall.

Niall probably died in 1316, leaving a strong legacy of heroism and royal favour, from which his offspring would benefit enormously.
