= Niall, Earl of Carrick =

Scottish earl (died 1256)

Níall of Carrick
- Reign: 1250–1256
- Predecessor: Donnchadh, Earl of Carrick
- Successor: Margaret (Marjorie or Marsaili), 3rd Countess of Carrick
- Died: 1256
- Spouse: Margaret Stewart
- Issue Detail: Margaret (Marjorie or Marsaili), 3rd Countess of Carrick
- Father: Donnchadh, Earl of Carrick
- Mother: Avelina (FitzAlan) Stewart

Níall (also Neil) of Carrick (Carrick, 1212 - 1256) was the second man to bear the title Mormaer, or Earl, of Carrick. He was successor of mormaer Donnchadh of Carrick.

== Life ==
Originally he was believed to be the son of Donnchadh and Avelina (FitzAlan) Stewart, however, it is now believed that he was more likely their grandson, the son of Donnchadh's oldest son and heir Cailean mac Donnchadh. Cailean, also known as Colin and Nicholaus of Carrick, predeceased his father and therefore upon Donnchadh's death in 1250, the title of Mormaer came to Niall. It has been suggested that Cailean's wife, Niall's mother, was a daughter of Niall Ruadh mac Aodha O'Neill (d. 1235), briefly king of Tír Eoghain in 1230, and Nuala O'Connor. Niall's grandfather Donnchadh held lands in Ireland, such a marriage of his son would have reinforced Donnchadh's Irish alliances and would account for the use of the name Niall. It would also explain the strong alliance with the Ó Neill held by Niall's grandsons. As the son of Cailean, Niall had one sister, Afraig, who married Gilleasbaig of Menstrie, a baron of Clackmannanshire who was the first attested man to bear the surname "Campbell".

Niall married his cousin Margaret Stewart, daughter of Walter Stewart, 3rd High Steward of Scotland, and wife Bethóc or Beatrix Mac Gille Críst of Angus, and together they had four daughters, the eldest of which was Margaret, better known as Marjorie, or Marsaili. On 12 September 1255 Níall, having no male heirs, granted the chiefship of the clan to his nephew Roland and his heirs, giving them all the powers in respect to the ceann ceneóil (head of kin). This grant was confirmed by King Alexander III at Stirling in 1276.

Niall died in 1256 and was succeeded by his daughter Marjorie, who took the title 3rd Countess of Carrick. The latter passed the mormaerdom on to her son Robert the Bruce, who became King Robert I of Scotland.

| Preceded by Donnchad | Mormaer of Carrick; 1250–1256 | Succeeded by Marjory |
