= John of Strathbogie, Earl of Atholl =

Scottish noble (c. 1266 – 1306)

John of Strathbogie (c. 1266 – 7 November 1306) was warden and Justiciary of Scotland.

== Early years and family ==
John was born in Atholl, Perthshire, Scotland around 1266. He was the son of David I Strathbogie, Earl of Atholl (d. 1270), by his spouse Isabel de Chilham (also known as Isabel de Dover), daughter of Richard de Dover, Baron of Chilham, Kent and his wife Matilda, Countess of Angus. John de Strathbogie first appears on record as his father's son and heir in 1282. He was a great-great-grandson of King John of England through an illegitimate line.

== Life and military service ==
In 1284, he joined with other Scottish noblemen who acknowledged Margaret, Maid of Norway, as the heir presumptive to King Alexander III. In 1296, he fought on the Scottish side at the Battle of Dunbar, where he was captured and sent to the Tower of London. After a year's confinement there he was set free on condition that he served King Edward I of England in Flanders.

He did homage for his manor of Lesnes (Erith), Kent, in 1305 but subsequently returned to Scotland, and in 1306 joined Robert the Bruce in his rising against English overlordship, and his English possessions were forfeited. He took part in Robert's coronation in that year.

== Execution ==
In the subsequent English invasion of Scotland in 1306, he was taken prisoner at the Battle of Methven. John, Earl of Atholl, was hanged in London on 7 November 1306, on a gallows 30 feet higher than ordinary. This was to signify his higher status than his fellow prisoners: no earl had been executed in England for 230 years. His body was burnt and his head fixed on London Bridge.

== Marriage and children ==
John married Marjory (also known as Margaret), daughter of Domhnall I, Earl of Mar. They had two sons and a daughter:

- David de Strathbogie, 10th Earl of Atholl (d. 28 December 1326)
- Sir John de Strathbogie, Knight.
- Isabel, wife or mistress of Edward de Brus, Earl of Carrick.
