= William Douglas, Lord of Liddesdale =

Scottish nobleman and soldier

Sir William Douglas Lord of Liddesdale
- Arms: Argent a heart Gules on a chief Azure three mullets of the first.
- Died: 1353
- Resting place: Melrose Abbey
- Spouse: Elizabeth
- Children: Mary Douglas
- Parent: James Douglas of Lothian

Sir William Douglas, Lord of Liddesdale (c. 1300–1353), also known as the Knight of Liddesdale and the Flower of Chivalry, was a Scottish nobleman and soldier active during the Second War of Scottish Independence.

== Family and early life ==
Douglas' father, James Douglas of Lothian, a minor landowner in the Lothians was a second cousin of the "Good Sir James" Douglas, a hero of the First War of Scottish Independence. At some point, c. 1323, Douglas succeeded to his small desmesne.

Some time later, c. 1327, he became godfather to his third cousin William, son of Sir Archibald Douglas, and nephew of the "Good Sir James".

Douglas was to hold minor positions of state and is not much heard of until 1332.

== Political context ==
Robert the Bruce died in 1329, while his son David II was still a child. Edward III of England, son of Edward II, had just attained his majority and was known to resent his father's disgrace at the hands of the Scots, and his own supposed humiliation when forced to sign the Treaty of Northampton in 1328, at just sixteen years old. Meanwhile, the "Good Sir James" died on Crusade in 1330.

== The Disinherited ==
A party known as the Disinherited (senior Anglo-Scottish Nobles on the losing side after Bannockburn) lured Edward Balliol, son of former King John of Scotland from France in 1331, with the aim of restoring him to the throne and their privileges.

Throughout the winter and spring of 1332 the Disinherited led by a veteran campaigner Henry de Beaumont and Balliol, with tacit support, but outward neutrality from Edward III, were gathering supplies and men for the invasion of Scotland. The last of the old guard Thomas Randolph, 1st Earl of Moray, Bruce's nephew died in July and the leadership crisis in Scotland made it ripe for the picking.

In violation of the Treaty of Northampton, which forbade any military incursions across the Border, Balliol's forces set sail from the Yorkshire coast and landed at Kinghorn in Fife, and marched to meet the forces of David Bruce. The Battle of Dupplin Moor, was a decisive defeat for the defenders and Balliol was crowned King of Scots on 24 September.

Balliol had little support in his new kingdom, except in his ancestral lands in Galloway. Balliol and his army marched across the Lowlands, and was being slowly eroded by guerrilla tactics learnt only twenty years previously. Balliol was ambushed at the Battle of Annan on 16 December 1332.

Balliol's brother, Henry, is said to have died in the skirmish, and it is the first time that William Douglas is recorded in battle, and Balliol himself had to flee south ignominiously.

== Open war ==
In 1333, Edward dropped all pretence of neutrality, repudiated the Treaty of Northampton, and attacked Scottish Berwick-upon-Tweed, Douglas' kinsman Sir Archibald Douglas, now Guardian of Scotland, rushed to meet the English host and battle commenced at Halidon Hill, resulting in a crushing defeat for the Scots. Sir Archibald was killed, William, the young Lord of Douglas also. Hordes of valuable hostages were taken.

Young King David II, Douglas' godson William Douglas, and the latter's brother, John Douglas, escaped to France. However, Edward chose to restore Balliol to Scotland and retired south. The supporters of King David elected two new guardians of the realm, John Randolph, 3rd Earl of Moray, Bruce's great-nephew and Robert Stewart, High Steward of Scotland and Bruce's grandson.

In 1335, Edward decide to take matters into his own hands again and entered Scotland with a force large enough to occupy the whole south of the country, taking Edinburgh castle and heavily rebuilding and refortifying it.

== Retaliation ==
William Douglas had been captured earlier in 1333, at an action known as the Battle of Dornock, and so escaped the carnage that had wiped out or captured the leading men of the nation at Halidon Hill. Upon his release in 1334, he started raiding Galloway under the command of John Randolph, 3rd Earl of Moray, capturing Guy II, Count of Namur at the Battle of Boroughmuir. After Randolph's capture and without his support Douglas started building his own power base. Douglas returned to his lands in Lothian and as he had a pitiful amount of tenantry to draw upon, he organised a company of men that would follow him based on his martial prowess.

"The armed bands led by Douglas, his contemporary Alexander Ramsay and others lived 'in poverty' and 'like shadows', fighting a guerrilla war against the English....Ramsay based his followers in a network of caves at Hawthorndean in Midlothian, while Douglas, operated from lairs in the [Ettrick] Forest or the Pentland Hills, was wounded twice and risked capture ambushing larger English forces. But these leaders engaging in small-scale warfare were the only active opponents of the English in the South."

Later historians and chroniclers would praise Douglas and his guerrillas as "schools of Knighthood", earning him the epithet Flower of Chivalry just as they had praised his relative the Good Sir James for his guerrilla tactics in the First War of Independence.

== Actions in the South ==
Douglas did not have a large tenantry base to work with himself, so the majority of the men that led his companies were bound by kinship, and their adherents. In his native Lothian, Douglas' clear leadership won over local gentry and their followings, but throughout the rest of the south it was Douglas' military successes that won him great support. He became known as the "Flail of the English and Wall of the Scots". Douglas was starting to be viewed in much the same way as his illustrious cousin "The Good Sir James" had been a generation before.

=== Battle of Culblean and its aftermath ===
In September 1335, the rump of the Bruce party, gathered at Dumbarton Castle and re-elected as Guardian of the realm, Sir Andrew Murray, son of William Wallace's comrade and his namesake. A month later Murray's forces met with the English pro-Baliol forces under David de Strathbogie at Culblean, in Aberdeenshire. Murray's army divided into two with Douglas' leading the forward unit. When he saw Strathbogie arrayed for battle Douglas halted, as if hesitating in the face of the enemy's preparedness. This had the desired effect and Strathbogie led his men in a downhill charge; but their ranks began to break on reaching a burn, and Douglas ordered a counter-charge. Sir Andrew with the rearguard immediately launched an assault on the enemy's exposed flank. The charge was so fierce that the bushes in the way were all born down. Pinned down in front and attacked from the side, Strathbogie's army broke. Unable to escape, and refusing to surrender, Strathbogie stood with his back to an oak tree and was killed in a last stand with a small group of followers, including Walter and Thomas Comyn. The battle of Culblean, though by no means the largest confrontation in the conflict was pivotal in the fortunes of the followers of David Bruce, and heavily demoralised the forces of Baliol.

In 1339, Douglas visited the King at Château Gaillard on the Seine, 50 miles North-West of Paris. He returned from France with a party of French knights and crossbowmen as well as arms and armour and the promise of Royal favour in return for helping arrange and prepare the way for the King's return to Scotland. In June, Douglas laid siege to and accepted the surrender of Cupar Castle with the aid of the French. They then proceeded to aid at the siege of Perth where Douglas was one of the leaders, under the Stewart who had become Guardian after the death of Sir Andrew Murray, with the continued aid of the party of French knights and crossbowmen. After the surrender of Perth the French party is believed to have then returned to France.

=== Control of the Borders and capture of Hermitage Castle ===
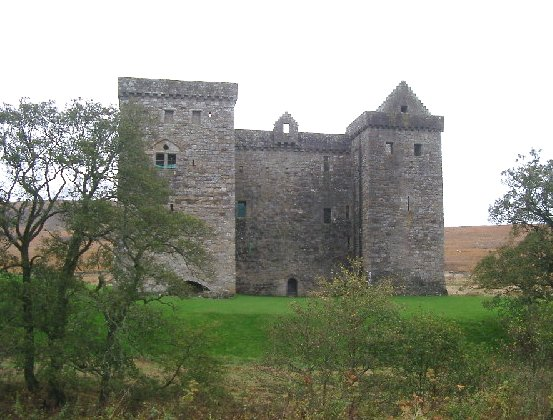
Hermitage Castle.

In the later 1330s Douglas continued to consolidate his powerbase in Southern Scotland using the Great Forest of Ettrick as cover to mount increasingly punishing raids upon the English, as had "The Good Sir James" before him.

William Douglas seized control of Liddesdale from the English in 1337 and captured the following year, Hermitage Castle the key fortress in Liddesdale and over much of the Border country. Hermitage had been a royal castle under the Bruce, having been forfeited by Sir William de Soulis in 1320. It had been captured during the English invasion and granted to the Englishman Sir Ralph de Neville.

=== Capture of Edinburgh Castle ===
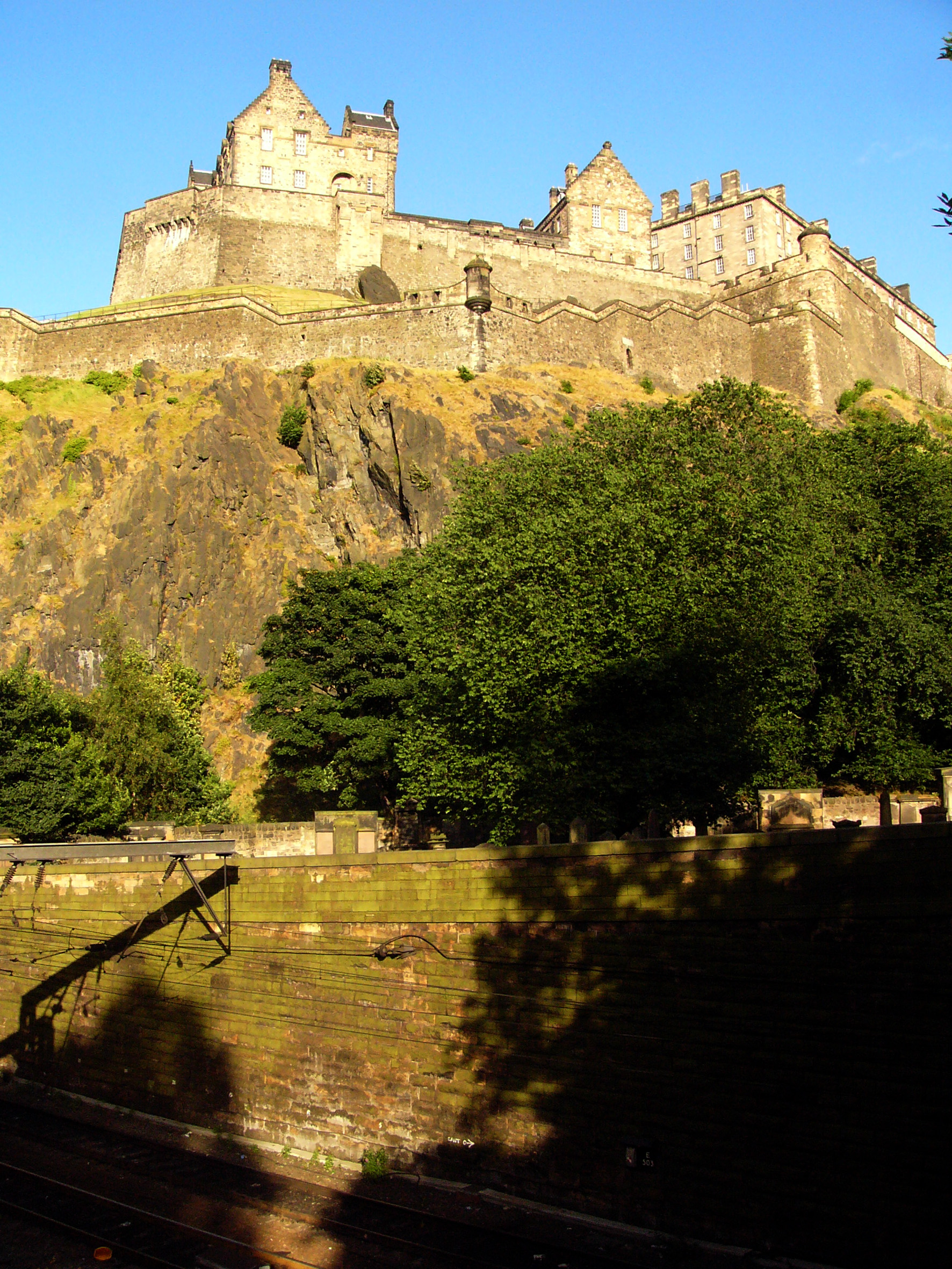
Edinburgh Castle.

By 1341, such was Douglas' burgeoning experience and ability, that he was able to recapture the heavily defended Castle of Edinburgh, in English hands since the invasion of 1335. A repeat of Thomas Randolph, 1st Earl of Moray's daring recapture in 1314 where they scaled the Castle-rock was impossible as a result of Edward's new fortifications. Douglas had to come up a new strategy, and decided on adopting a very old one, that of the Trojan Horse.

The garrison of the castle was in constant need of supplies and fodder for their beasts and horses, and used various local merchants for that purpose. Douglas and his lieutenants dressed as merchants, and acquired some hay wains, in which they concealed their warriors. On gaining entry to the castle the final wagon stopped to bar the gates from closing. Douglas' men poured from the wagons and through the open gates came the citizenry of Edinburgh to slaughter the English defenders, throwing many off the Castle-rock.

Control of Edinburgh gave Douglas the power and influence to control all of Southern Scotland from Dumfries to the Merse. However, his legal position was tenuous and had to be maintained by force. While his predecessor "The Good Sir James" had been tied by bonds of personal friendship and loyalty to The Bruce, there were no such links between the exiled David II and the remaining Guardian, Robert Stewart. William received no support militarily and no preference in the issuing of charters of land from Robert. To ensure that his efforts to secure his pre-eminence were not in vain, Douglas decided to visit King David in France in an attempt to forge a friendship between them.

== Return of David II ==
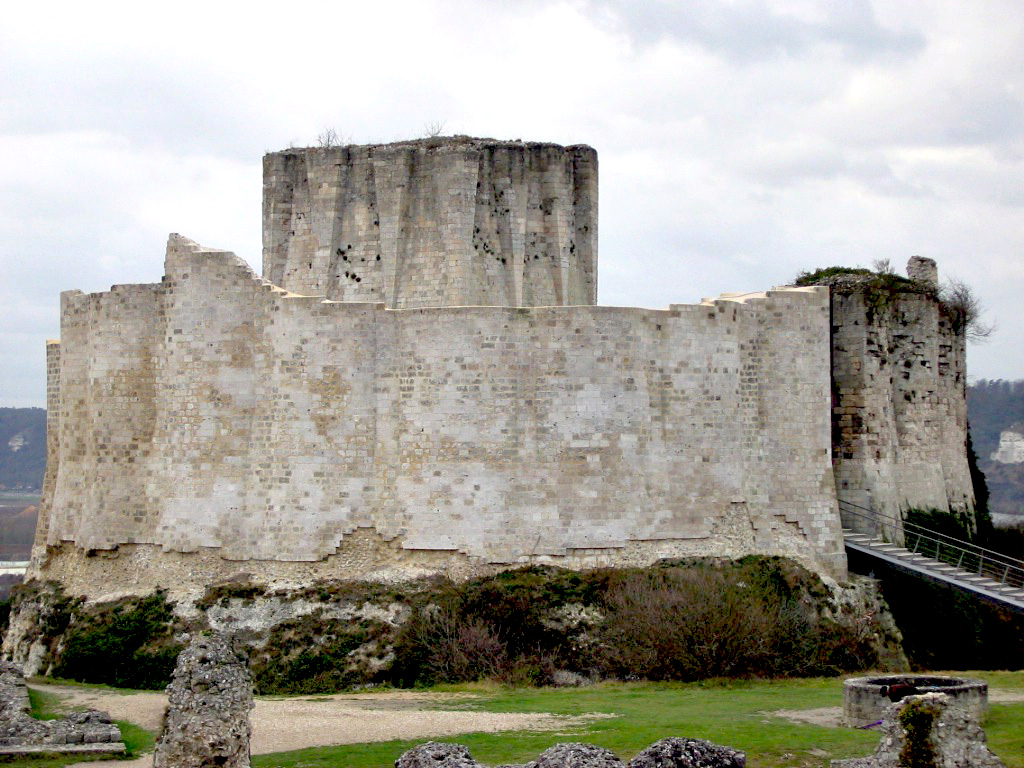
Château Gaillard, home of David II during his childhood

In July 1342 Douglas was granted the Earldom of Atholl, which had been retained by the crown for some years. He was only to hold the earldom for a matter of months, before being compelled to resign title to King David's uncle, the High Steward of Scotland Robert Stewart (later Robert II of Scotland). In September of the same year, perhaps in recognition of his loss of the earldom, King David granted the forfeited lands of Sir James Lovell, in Eskdale and Ewesdale, to Douglas. Later in 1342, Douglas was again in legal wrangling with the Steward, being compelled to resign lands he held in wardship for the young Lord of Douglas, to him. The charter for these lands, in Douglas' powerbase of Liddesdale was considered defective, because Sir Archibald, the guardian had granted the lands to himself during king David's minority.

== Murder of Ramsay ==
Douglas and his compatriot Sir Alexander Ramsay of Dalhousie had a keen rivalry between them, which may have been exacerbated into jealousy, by a duel which took place in December 1341. Douglas had challenged by Henry, Earl of Derby at Roxburgh. Douglas, by virtue of his lance breaking on his first tilt and the damage to his hand thereof, could not carry on with the joust. A tournament was arranged between the chivalry of both nations to reach a more satisfactory outcome. Douglas had still not recovered the use of his hand, so the Scottish knights were led by Sir Alexander Ramsay and won against the English. However, a more plausible explanation was Ramsay and his men's recapture of Roxburgh Castle from the English on 30 March 1342 by means of a daring night escalade. The titular constable of the Castle, Sir William Douglas, had several times tried unsuccessfully to retake it. For Ramsay's daring feat, King David II appointed him constable of Roxburgh and Sheriff of Teviotdale, outraging Douglas.

Because of these or possibly for other reasons, Douglas led a large force of men to Hawick where Ramsay was holding court. Douglas' men seized the Ramsay, tied him to a mule, and removed him to Hermitage Castle. Ramsay was thrown into the oubliette there, and was starved to death, lingering for up to seventeen days without food or water.

However, about a year later, after intervention by the Stewart, Douglas was back in the King's favour and restored to his previous offices by late 1342.

== Neville's Cross ==
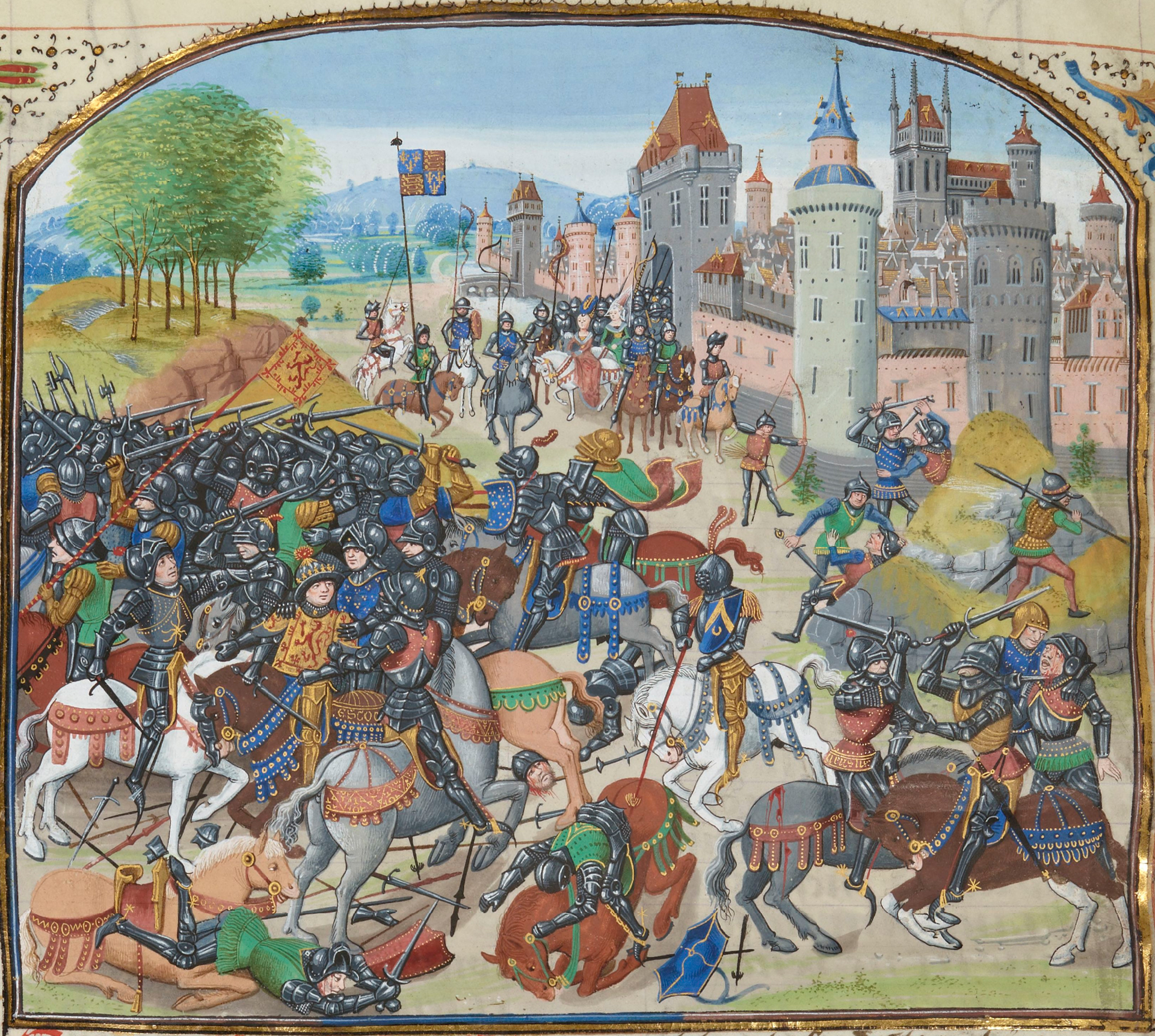
Battle of Neville's Cross

In 1346, the greater part of the English army of Edward III were away at war fighting against the French. The French were desperate for the English to be diverted and called upon King David II of Scotland to attack the English northern border. King David gladly obliged and sallied forth into England with 12,000 men who wrecked and plundered parts of Cumberland and Northumberland before entering Durham where they made camp at Bearpark to the west of the city. The Scots were divided into three factions under the respective commands of King David, the Earl of Moray and Sir William Douglas.

On 17 October, Sir William Douglas allowed his men to go on a rampage throughout Durham straying as far south as Ferryhill where to their surprise they encountered part of an English army of some 6,000 to 7,000 which pursued them north. Under the leadership of Sir Ralph Neville and supported by the men of Thomas Rokeby and Lord Percy, the English were successful in this initial encounter and a number of Scots lost their lives. Moving north the real battle took place on the Red Hills in the vicinity of a stone cross called Neville's Cross (which existed before the battle). The Scottish left under the Earl of March and Robert Stewart broke and fled the field. The Scottish forces were overwhelmed.

King David was seriously wounded in the fierce fighting, injured by two arrows which struck him in the face. Although some accounts say that King David was forced to flee the field others state, more plausibly, that he held his ground surrounded by his loyal household knights and esquires, knocking out two of the teeth of his captor, John de Coupland, with his mailed fist. Eventually, he was ransomed after being held prisoner by the English for eleven years.

== Return of Lord Douglas ==
Although the English king soon ransomed some of the Scottish nobles to gain revenue for his war with France, the Knight of Liddesdale and, of course, the king continued to be imprisoned in the Tower of London.

However, the prison experience did not fully stifle the Knight's intrigues in Scotland, for in 1350, four years into his captivity, he somehow managed to arrange for the assassination of Sir David Barclay, to avenge Barclay's murder of the Knight's brother, which occurred while the Knight was in the Tower.

In 1351, King Edward, still needing funds for his wars, decided it was time to ransom the Scottish king. He set the king's ransom at £40,000, and King David was given a temporary release from prison, to persuade the Scottish nobles to satisfy the demand. As a part of the scheme, Douglas was released as well, with the understanding that he would strengthen Edward's hand with military support. Thus, the two rode northward, accompanied by a guard of English soldiers.

Due to internal conflicts in Scotland, however, the two failed to secure the ransom, and both were returned to the Tower. The English king's next stratagem was to “turn” the Knight of Liddlesdale to his cause. Taking advantage of this offer, Douglas agreed to the following terms: (a) his surrender of Liddel Castle, (b) loyalty to the English king against all enemies—excepting the Scots, unless he (Liddesdale) so desired; and (c) the surrender of his daughter and nearest male heir (his nephew, James de Douglas) for a period of two years. In return, Douglas would gain his freedom and would be granted the territory of Liddesdale, Hermitage Castle, and certain lands in Annandale. Having engaged in this act of treason, the Knight of Liddesdale was set free and returned to Scotland in July, 1352, counting on the support of Scots sympathetic to England to aid him in his scheme. However, this hope was frustrated by the fact that William, Lord Douglas, had secured the loyalty of those Scots before the Knight of Liddesdale had even been released.

== Death ==
The Knight of Liddesdale discovered that much had changed in Scotland during his eleven years of captivity, not least of which was that William, Lord (afterwards Earl) of Douglas had filled the power vacuum created by his absence. In fact, when the Knight of Liddesdale was coming north into England to betray his country, the Lord Douglas was fighting to keep the English south of the Scottish Border. What followed next has been a matter of debate for centuries now. These two powerful and influential kinsmen, each with his own agenda, encountered each other one day when the Knight was hunting in Ettrick Forest, and the Lord Douglas killed the Knight of Liddesdale. William of Liddesdale's body was taken first to Linden Kirk, a chapel in Ettrick, and then on to Melrose Abbey for burial in front of the altar of St. Bridget (the patron saint of Clan Douglas). Later, the Lord of Douglas granted a mortification to the church for the saying of masses for the soul of the man he had slain. Galswood (or Galford), the site of the Knight's death, was renamed William's Hope, and a cross called William's Cross was raised on the spot in his memory.

Various theories have been offered regarding the reason for the Lord Douglas's act of violence that day. The chronicler John of Fordun (d. 1384) reasoned that the murder was revenge for the Knight's killing of Sir Alexander Ramsay and Sir David Barclay. The historian David Hume of Godscroft (d. 1629) considered the murder an act of jealous rage, brought on by the Knight's attentions to the Countess of Douglas, a notion that had become the subject of a popular ballad. However, this is easily set aside by the fact that the Lord Douglas did not actually marry until 1357. A third explanation for Liddesdale's murder is that the Lord of Douglas had discovered his godson’s treacherous plan, which he sought to prevent. For this, there is no evidence, but it is possible that he had learned of it. The last theory is that the Lord of Douglas was furious that Liddesdale had given away the lands that he had belonged to the Douglas lordship, and indeed he did eventually claim them as his own.

On 8 October 1354 Edward III seized Hermitage Castle, but returned it to Elizabeth, the widow of the Knight, after she swore fealty to him and agreed to allow an English garrison to be kept there. He further promised to increase his gifts if she would marry an Englishman. Upon her marriage to Hugh Dacre (brother of William, Lord Dacre), the promise was kept and Dacre was made commander of the garrison. In 1355, he was officially appointed keeper of Hermitage Castle with the right of his heirs to hold it as well. Once this agreement was made, the Knight of Liddesdale's daughter and male heir were released from their captivity in London.
