= Battle of Culblean =

Battle on 30 November 1335, during the Second War of Scottish Independence

Coordinates: 57.0899°N 2.9341°W

- Part of Second War of Scottish Independence
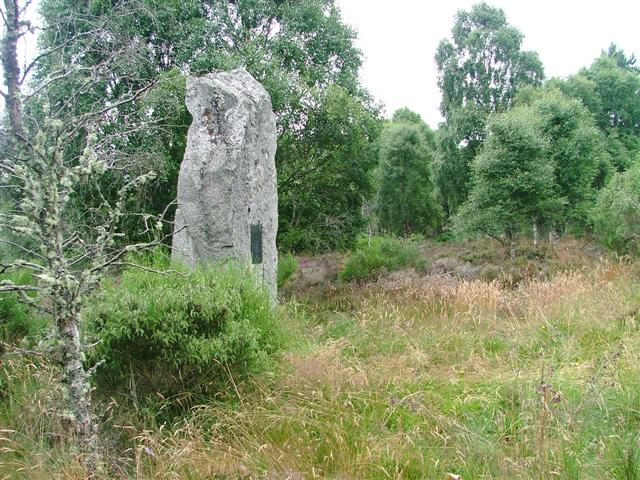
- Monument marking the site of the Battle of Culblean
Date	30 November 1335
Location	Culblean, Aberdeenshire, Scotland
Result	Victory for Bruce partisans

Belligerents
Bruce loyalists	Balliol supporters English allies

Commanders and leaders
Sir Andrew Murray; Sir William Douglas	David, Earl of Atholl †

Strength
1,100	3,000

Casualties and losses
Light	Heavy

The Battle of Culblean was fought on the 30th of November 1335, during the Second War of Scottish Independence. The Scots, led by Guardian Sir Andrew Murray, achieved victory over an Anglo-Scottish force commanded by David III Strathbogie, titular Earl of Atholl a strong supporter of Edward Balliol.

== Background ==
After the murder of John Comyn, nephew of the former King John Balliol, by Robert Bruce and his supporters in 1306, the Scottish War of Independence was both a war of independence and a civil war, with the Balliol and Comyn parties taking the side of the English. In the winter of 1314 the Scottish Parliament, the first to meet after King Robert's victory at the Battle of Bannockburn, pronounced a formal sentence of forfeiture against all those who held land in Scotland but continued to fight on the side of the English. Thus was created a class of nobility known as the disinherited, old Balliol loyalists who would not be reconciled with the Bruce party.

The 1328 Treaty of Northampton between England and Scotland, based on a full recognition of Robert Bruce's kingship, ended any immediate prospect these men had of gaining their lost inheritance. However, the death of Bruce in 1329, and the accession to the throne of David II, his infant son, offered them a second chance. Under the leadership of Henry de Beaumont, one of their number and a veteran of the Scottish wars, a party began to take shape in the early 1330s. This party focused its hopes on Edward Balliol, son of the former King John, as the rightful King of Scotland. In 1332 Beaumont and Balliol launched a seaborne invasion of Scotland, winning a victory at the Battle of Dupplin Moor; but with only limited support in the country they were expelled by the end of the year. Edward III, the young English king, who had been playing something of a double game, then decided to declare his open support for Balliol, and the Scots were defeated once again in the summer of 1333 at the Battle of Halidon Hill. Edward Balliol was reseated on his contentious throne, but his residence proved no more certain than before. In 1335, Edward III made what was to be his greatest effort on Balliol's behalf, coming to Scotland with a large army. Unable to force the issue into an open battle, he left the disinherited to manage as best they could.

== Appointment of Murray as Guardian ==
Although Scottish resistance was low at times, it was never completely extinguished. David II was sent to the safety of France in 1334. In September 1335, Sir Andrew Murray of Bothwell, whose father was also named Andrew, was joint commander, with William Wallace, of the victorious Scottish army at the Battle of Stirling Bridge and was appointed Guardian of Scotland by the rump of Bruce loyalists meeting in Dumbarton Castle. Within a short period, he was to become one of the country's greatest leaders, and a skilled student of the kind of guerilla warfare practised by King Robert in days past. Murray was consistent in his defence of the national cause, never at any time submitting to Edward III or Balliol, unlike Robert Stewart, nephew and heir of the infant David. The men who gathered around him at Dumbarton formed the nucleus of the national revival: the earls of March and Ross, Sir William Douglas, Maurice Murray, and William Keith. After the departure of the English king from Scotland — followed soon afterwards by Edward Balliol — Murray's chief opponent was David de Strathbogie, the titular earl of Atholl, and Balliol's chief lieutenant in the north.

== St. Andrew's Day, 1335 ==
In the late autumn of 1335, Strathbogie was operating north of the Forth, allegedly attempting to eradicate all freeholders, who from the time of William Wallace had been the backbone of Scottish resistance. Strathbogie's actions mirrored the policy of King Edward in southern Scotland, where over one hundred freeholders were forfeited in the period from 1335 to 1337. John of Fordun, a Scottish chronicler, reports the situation thus;

"But the great tyranny and cruelty this earl practiced among the people words cannot bring within the mind's grasp; some he disinherited, others he murdered: and in the end, he cast in his mind how he might wipe out the freeholders from the face of the earth."

Strathbogie crowned his campaign by laying siege to Kildrummy Castle in Strathdon in Aberdeenshire. Kildrummy had for some time been held for King David by his aunt, the Lady Christina Bruce, who also happened to be Murray's wife. From southern Scotland the Guardian rushed north to her aid, having gathered a modest force of some 800 men. Strathbogie, according to the historian Lord Hailes, had 3,000 men at his disposal. Murray's tactics were risky: he was marching into battle, which all Scots leaders had carefully avoided since the disaster at Halidon Hill. But the situation was critical: the fall of Kildrummy would have been a serious setback to the national cause in the north.

Strathbogie was warned of Murray's approach. He raised the siege of Kildrummy, moving south to intercept his enemy in the forest of Culblean. Murray was joined a few miles north of the River Dee, to the east of Strathbogie's position near Culblean Hill, by a party of three 300 men from Kildrummy, led by one John of the Craig. John's knowledge of the local countryside was invaluable. On the night of 29/30 November, he guided Murray's force on a wide-sweeping movement to the south and west, designed to take Strathbogie from the rear. As Murray approached at dawn on St. Andrew's Day, the element of surprise was lost when he was spotted by enemy scouts. The camp was warned and Strathbogie made ready. But his troops were largely recruited from the local area, probably by impressment, and he appears to have had no archers.

Murray's force was divided in two, the forward unit being commanded by William Douglas. When he saw Strathbogie arrayed for battle Douglas halted, as if hesitating in the face of the enemy's preparedness. This had the desired effect and Strathbogie led his men in a downhill charge; but their ranks began to break on reaching a burn, and Douglas ordered a counter-charge. Sir Andrew with the rearguard immediately launched an assault on the enemy's exposed flank. The charge was so fierce that the bushes in the way were all flattened down. Pinned down in front and attacked from the side, Strathbogie's army broke. Unable to escape, and refusing to surrender, Strathbogie stood with his back to an oak tree and was killed in a last stand with a small group of followers, including Walter and Thomas Comyn. Some of the survivors took refuge in the nearby island castle of Loch Kinord, but were forced to surrender the following day.

== Culblean in history ==
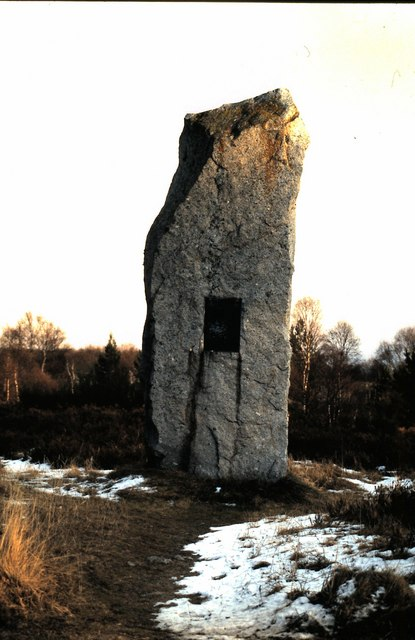
Culblean memorial stone

Compared with the other battles of the Wars of Independence, Culblean was a relatively small affair, and is now largely forgotten. Nevertheless, its size was greatly outweighed by its importance on the road to Scottish national recovery. W. Douglas Simpson passed what might be said to be the final verdict on the battle when he wrote; "Culblean was the turning point in the second war of Scottish Independence, and therefore an event of great national importance". Small as it was, it effectively nullified the effects of Edward's summer invasion, ending Balliol's hope of gaining the Scottish throne forever. Its effects were almost immediately felt. Edward Balliol spent the winter of 1335–6, so says the Lanercost Chronicle; ..."with his people at Elande, in England, because he does not yet possess in Scotland any castle or town where he could dwell in safety."
