= Andrew Murray (soldier) =

Scottish soldier and Guardian of the Realm (1298–1338)

- Born: Pentecost, 1298; Scotland, exact location unknown
- Died: Lent, 1338
- Resting place: Dunfermline Abbey
- Known for: leading resistance campaign during Second War of Scottish Independence
- Title: Guardian of Scotland, Lord of Petty and Bothwell
- Spouses: Unknown; Christina Bruce
- Children: John Murray; Thomas Murray
- Parent: Andrew Moray (father)
- Relatives: Robert I of Scotland (brother-in-law)

Sir Andrew Murray (1298–1338), also known as Sir Andrew Moray, or Sir Andrew de Moray, was a Scottish military and political leader who supported King David II of Scotland against Edward Balliol and King Edward III of England during the Second War of Scottish Independence. He held the lordships of Avoch and Petty in north Scotland, and Bothwell in west-central Scotland. In 1326 he married Christina Bruce, a sister of King Robert the Bruce. Murray was twice chosen as Guardian of Scotland, first in 1332, and again from 1335 on his return to Scotland after his release from captivity in England. He held the guardianship until his death in 1338.

== Childhood ==
Andrew Murray was born in 1298, around Pentecost. He was the son of Andrew Moray, joint-commander with William Wallace of the Scottish army at the Battle of Stirling Bridge on 11 September 1297. Murray's father was mortally wounded in that battle, dying sometime in the late 1297 before his son's birth. The identity of Murray's mother is not known.

During his campaign of 1303 while Edward I was residing in Lochindorb Castle in the Moray uplands, he dispatched men to seize the five-year-old Andrew Murray as a hostage. The child would spend the next eleven years in English captivity, only returning home to Scotland in the autumn of 1314 in the prisoner exchanges after the Battle of Bannockburn.

== Family ==
In July 1326 at a ceremony at Cambuskenneth Abbey, Andrew Murray married Christian Bruce, also known as Christina, sister of King Robert I, widow of Sir Christopher Seton. Some argue that Insofar as his wife may have been beyond child-bearing years at around 46 years of age, therefore it has been conjectured that his two known sons were from a previous marriage or relationship. Although her exact age or date of birth is not known, she was certainly well into her 40s at the time of the marriage.

- Sir John Murray (died 1351), married Margaret Graham, Countess of Menteith, without issue.
- Sir Thomas Murray (died 1361), married Joanna, daughter to Maurice de Moravia, Earl of Strathearn, without issue.

== Military and political career ==
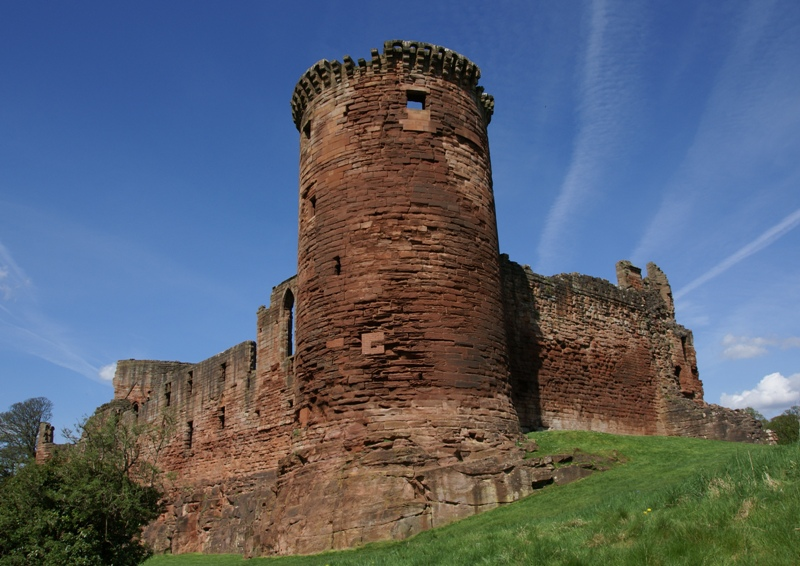
Bothwell Castle, the caput of the Murray lordship of Bothwell in Lanarkshire.

Following his return from English captivity, in 1315 Andrew Murray attended the Scottish Parliament at Ayr when the succession to the throne was decided.

Murray acceded his grandfather's lordships of Avoch, Boharm and Petty, and to that of his uncle, Sir William Murray, the lordship of Bothwell in Lanarkshire.

Andrew Murray appears to have been in receipt of an annuity in 1329–1330. When the treaty of Northampton was signed on 17 March 1328 at Holyrood in Edinburgh, he was among an impressive gathering of Scottish nobles present to witness the final peace between both countries. A peace which would last only 4 years.

When King Robert I died in June 1329 he left his nephew Thomas Randolph, the Earl of Moray as guardian of the infant King David. But Randolph died suddenly in June 1332. A period of turmoil befell the Scots. Domhnall, Earl of Mar was next chosen as Regent in a hasty gathering of the Scottish Nobles at Perth on 2 August. He would be killed 9 days later at the Battle of Dupplin Moor. Shortly after Edward Balliol was crowned, in 1332, Murray was elected warden or regent by the Scots who adhered to the young king, David II, but he had no opportunity of attempting anything till the following year, when he attacked Balliol at Roxburgh. While endeavouring to rescue Ralph Golding he was taken, and, refusing to be the prisoner of any one but the king of England, was carried to Durham, April 1333.

No sooner was he set at liberty, in 1334, than he raised armed opposition to the English. With Alexander de Mowbray he marched into Buchan, and besieged Henry de Beaumont in his castle of Dundarg, on the Moray Firth (August–November). By cutting the water pipes he compelled his foe to surrender, but he permitted him to return to England. Murray was present at the futile parliament convened at Dairsie Castle in April 1335, by the steward of Scotland and the returned Earl of Moray, the regents. In the subsequent surrender to Edward, and in the making of the treaty of Perth (18 August 1335), Murray had no part, but chose to go into hiding with the Earl of March and William Douglas, Lord of Liddesdale. When David of Strathbogie laid siege to Kildrummy castle, which was held by Murray's wife, Murray led an army of eleven hundred men north to raise the siege. They surprised and slew Strathbogie in the forest of Kilblain or Culbleen.

== Guardian of the Realm ==
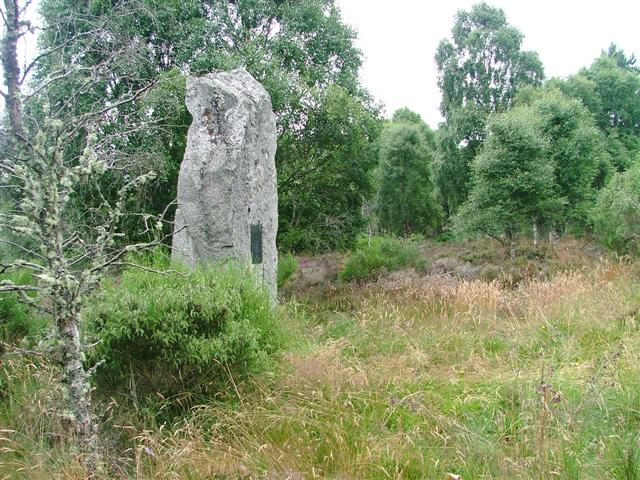
Monument marking the site of the battle of Culblean.

Murray assembled a parliament at Dunfermline, and was again made warden. Edward Balliol marched into Scotland, and vainly endeavoured to bring him to action. During the winter of 1335–6, Murray kept an army in the field, and laid siege to the castles of Cupar, Fife and Lochindorb in Cromdale, in the latter of which was Catherine, Athole's widow. He retired from Lochindorb on the approach of Edward. No sooner had Edward returned to England, he assumed the offensive, capturing the castles of Dunnottar, Lauriston, and Kinclaven, and laid waste the lands of Kincardine and Angus. Early in 1337, having received the support of the Earls of March and Fife and William Douglas, he marched through Fife, destroyed the tower of Falkland, took the castle of Leuchars, and, after three weeks' siege, captured and sacked St Andrews Castle (28 February). Cupar still held out, under the ecclesiastic, William Bullock. In March, Murray recaptured Bothwell Castle which was being used by the English as a base of operations. Murray was the rightful owner of Bothwell but slighted the castle nonetheless. His destruction of the great tower, the most visible part of the structure, not only prevented reoccupation by the English but also demonstrated his loyalty to the Bruce cause.

Murray led his troops as far as Carlisle, then wheeled about on Edinburgh, which he proceeded to invest. The English Marchers rushed to its relief, and met the Scots at Crichton. In the combat Douglas was wounded, and Sir Andrew, though claiming the victory, saw fit to raise the siege. In 1337 he is referred to as having been keeper of Berwick Castle, but there is not much further record of him until his death in 1338.

== Death ==
Murray, having fallen ill at the siege of Edinburgh castle in the early months of 1338, returned to Ormond Castle in the lands of the lordship of Avoch. He died there around Lent 1338.

He was buried in the chapel of Rosemarkie (Rosmarkyne), but his remains were afterwards removed to Dunfermline Abbey.

== See also ==
- Bothwell Castle
- Clan Murray
- Kildrummy Castle

== Sources ==
- Bower, Walter, Scotichronicon, ed. D. E. R. Watt, 1987–1993.
- Campbell, T., England, Scotland and the Hundred Years War, in Europe in the Late Middle Ages, ed. J. Hale et al., 1970.
- Calendar of Documents Relating to Scotland, Four Volumes, ed. J. Bain, 1881–1888;
- Douglas-Simpson, W., Campaign and Battle of Culblean, in Proceedings of the Society of Antiquarians in Scotland, vol 64 1929–30.
- Fordun, John of, Chronicles of the Scottish Nation, ed. W. F. Skene, 1872.
- Gray, Thomas, Scalicronica, ed H. Maxwell, 1913.
- The Lanercost Chronicle, ed. H. Maxwell, 1913.
- Hailes, Lord (david Dalrymple, The Annals of Scotland, 1776.
- Nicholson, R., Edward III and the Scots, 1965.
- Reid, R. C. Edward de Balliol, in Transactions of the Dumfriesshire and Galloway Antiquarian and Natural History Society, vol. 35 1956–7.
- Traquair, Peter Freedom's Sword 1998
- Webster, B., Scotland without a King, 1329-1341, in Medieval Scotland: Crown, Lordship and Community., ed. A. Grant and K. J. Stringer 1993.
- Wyntoun, Andrew, The Original Chronicle of Scotland, ed. F. J. Amours, 1907.
