= David III Strathbogie =

Scottish noble

David Strathbogie
- 11th Earl of Atholl
- Arms of the Earl of Atholl
- Born: 1 February 1309
- Died: 30 November 1335 (aged 26); Culblean, Aberdeenshire, Scotland
- Spouse: Katherine Beaumont
- Issue: David IV Strathbogie
- Father: David II Strathbogie
- Mother: Joan Comyn

David III Strathbogie (1 February 1309 – 30 November 1335) was a 14th-century Anglo-Scottish noble. He was prominent figure in the early years of the Second War of Scottish Independence, as one of the chief supporters of Edward Balliol.

== Early life ==
He was born the eldest son and heir of David II Strathbogie, Earl of Atholl, Constable of Scotland and Chief Warden of Northumberland, by his spouse Joan, elder daughter of Sir John Comyn of Badenoch, Joint Guardian of Scotland. David II defected to the English during the First War of Scottish Independence and his earldom was consequently declared forfeit in 1314 and bestowed upon King Robert's brother in law, Neil Campbell. David III would later dedicate his career to reclaiming the earldom and his father and mother's other Scottish lands.

David took part in his first military action in 1327, serving with Edward III on the unsuccessful Weardale campaign in Scotland. Sometime between 1327 and 1330, David was married to Katherine Beaumont, daughter of another prominent disinherited noble, Henry de Beaumont, who claimed the Earldom of Buchan by right of his wife, Alice Comyn. Katherine's dowry included parts of the manor of Ponteland, Little Eland, and Calverdon in Northumberland. Because of David's close ties to Beaumont, who joined the rebellion led by the Earl of Lancaster against Queen Isabella and Roger Mortimer, David's English lands were temporarily seized and he was fined five thousand pounds, though the lands were restored only a month later and the fine was waived in 1331.

David was summoned to the English parliament from 25 January 1330 to 24 July 1334, by Writs directed to David de Strabolgi comiti Athol. In 1330 the English Crown conferred upon him the castle and manor of Odogh, in Ireland, which had belonged to his great-uncle, Aymer de Valence, Earl of Pembroke.

== Second War of Scottish Independence ==
In 1332 he joined the other disinherited Anglo-Scottish nobles in an attempt to make Edward Balliol king and have their Scottish lands restored. As a descendant of John Comyn of Badenoch (Balliol's first cousin), David had a potential claim to be Balliol's heir. David was present at the victory over Scottish forces at the battle of Dupplin Moor, 11 August 1332, following which Balliol made him Earl of Atholl and restored his mother and father's estates in Scotland. He was also present at the Battle of Halidon Hill the following year, and at a parliament in 1334, Balliol granted David the lands and title of Robert Stewart. That same year, however, David and his father-in-law had a falling out with Balliol over a decision regarding the inheritance of the lands of Alexander de Mowbray. David and Beaumont subsequently departed from Edinburgh to their estates in the north, where David was pursued by John Randolph, Earl of Moray. Randolph caught David and forced him to defect to the Bruce loyalists.

Now officially fighting for David II of Scotland, he was confirmed as earl of Atholl and Constable of Scotland and acted as King David's lieutenant in the north of Scotland against Balliol's forces. However, conflict soon arose among the Bruce party over the fate of Comyn lands in the north of Scotland. David and Robert Stewart allied to oppose John Randolph at a parliament in April 1335, with neither side coming away satisfied. When Balliol and the English invaded a few months later, David once again changed sides, returning to Balliol's service. After putting siege to Kildrummy castle, he was killed fighting the Scottish guardian, Sir Andrew Murray at the Battle of Culblean (or Kilblane), in a serious setback for Balliol's forces. David's widow, Katherine, was subsequently besieged by Murray at the castle of Lochindorb. She led the defence of the castle until 1336, when English forces relieved them and she was able to return to England. She appealed to the King to retrieve her portion from the Strathbogie estate after David's death.

David and Katherine had one son, David IV Strathbogie, and a probable daughter Isabel, wife of Sir Edmund de Cornwall, Knt. David IV never attempted to reclaim the earldom of Atholl or his father's Scottish lands.
