= Henry de Beaumont =

English noble (1280–1340)

- 4th Earl of Buchan & 1st Baron Beaumont
- Arms of Beaumont: Azure semée of fleurs-de-lis, a lion rampant or
- Born: c. 1280; France
- Died: 10 March 1340
- Noble family: de Brienne
- Spouse: Alice Comyn, Countess of Buchan
- Issue: Katherine, Countess of Atholl; Elizabeth de Beaumont, Lady Audley; Richard de Beaumont; John de Beaumont; Thomas de Beaumont; Alice de Beaumont; Joan de Beaumont, Lady FitzWarin; Beatrice, Countess of Dammartin; John de Beaumont, 2nd Lord Beaumont; Isabel of Beaumont, Duchess of Lancaster
- Father: Louis de Brienne
- Mother: Agnès de Beaumont

Henry de Beaumont (c. 1280 – 10 March 1340), jure uxoris 4th Earl of Buchan and suo jure 1st Baron Beaumont, was a French nobleman and a key figure in the Anglo-Scots wars of the thirteenth and fourteenth centuries, known as the Wars of Scottish Independence.

Taken into service at the English court at a young age, Beaumont was a veteran campaigner who participated in every major engagement, from the Battle of Falkirk in 1298 to the Battle of Halidon Hill in 1333. His long experience in the Scottish wars led him to develop a battle technique later used to great effect at Crécy and Agincourt.

Beaumont was one of the most prominent among Anglo-Scots nobles known as the 'Disinherited', nobles whose Scottish lands had been forfeited over their refusal to serve Robert the Bruce. Beaumont supported Edward Balliol in his bid for the Scottish throne, which would eventually overturn the peace between England and Scotland established by the Treaty of Northampton and bring about the Second War of Scottish Independence.

== Early life and career ==
Henry de Beaumont was the son of Louis of Brienne (d. after 1 September 1297) and Agnès de Beaumont, Viscount of Beaumont in Maine, France and Seigneur of Beaumont-le-Vicomte (later Beaumont-sur-Sarthe), Sainte-Suzanne, La Fleche, Fresnay-le-Vicomte, Le Lude. His brother was Lewis de Beaumont, bishop of Durham.

Beaumont was made a household knight of King Edward I in 1297, and took up military service with him in Flanders in 1297 against Philip IV of France shortly thereafter. Beaumont served with Edward the following year when, following the English defeat against the Scots at the Battle of Stirling Bridge, Edward returned to England and led a campaign into Scotland. In the ensuing Battle of Falkirk, Beaumont was one of the young knights who had his horse killed from under him by the spears of William Wallace's schiltrons.

== Service under Edward II ==
Beaumont quickly became a favourite of Edward II, following his ascension as king in 1307. Beaumont was given large grants of manors and lands, including Folkingham, Barton-upon-Humber, and Heckington, Lincolnshire. He was summoned to parliament from 4 March 1309 to 20 October 1332, by Writs directed to Henrico de Bellomonte, whereby he is held to have become Lord Beaumont. More substantially, Edward II granted him the lordship of the Isle of Man on 16 March 1310.

Because of the favour shown to Beaumont and his siblings, the next year he and his sister, Isabel de Vesci, were banished from Court by the Ordainers along with Piers Gaveston, though they soon returned. Among the Ordainers demands was that the Isle of Man ought to be revoked from Beaumont and instead be held by "a good Englishman", a dig at Beaumont's French origin, which was another reason for his unpopularity.

Despite this, Beaumont continued to be a prominent figure at Edward II's court. In 1313 he and his sister acquired the reversion of the manors of Seacourt, Berkshire, and Tackley, Oxfordshire, which, upon her death without issue in 1334, fell to him. In 1312 he received Birthorpe, Lincolnshire, forfeited by Roger de Birthorpe following an attack on nearby Sempringham Priory. Beaumont also purchased the Lordship of Ditchburn, Northumberland, in 1320.

By 14 July 1310, Beaumont had married Alice Comyn, daughter of the niece and heir of John Comyn, Earl of Buchan. Consequently, Beaumont claimed the earldom of Buchan and constableship of Scotland jure uxoris. Alice, however, fled to England around the time of her uncle's defeat by Robert the Bruce in 1308, and she never exercised any control over her lands in Scotland. Between 1317 and 1321, Alice succeeded to the English estates of her sister, Margery Comyn, wife successively of Sir John Ross and Sir William de Lindsay.

== Bannockburn and aftermath ==
Beaumont accompanied Edward II on his campaign into Scotland in 1314, and subsequently fought at the Battle of Bannockburn. On the first day of the battle Henry was in one of the two cavalry forces alongside Robert Clifford and Sir Thomas de Grey of Heaton, father of the chronicler Thomas Grey whose account of events follows;

Robert Lord de Clifford and Henry de Beaumont, with three hundred men-at-arms, made a circuit upon the other side of the wood towards the castle, keeping the open ground. Thomas Randolph, 1st Earl of Moray, King Robert's nephew, who was the leader of the Scottish advanced guard, hearing that his uncle had repulsed the advanced guard of the English on the other side of the wood, thought that he must have his share, and issuing from the wood with his division marched across the open ground towards the two afore-named lords.

Sir Henry de Beaumont called to his men: "Let us wait a little; let them come on; give them room".

"Sir," said Sir Thomas Gray, "I doubt that whatever you give them now, they will have all too soon".

"Very well" exclaimed the said Henry, "if you are afraid, be off".

"Sir," answered the said Thomas, "it is not from fear that I shall fly this day."

So saying, he spurred in between Beaumont and Sir William Deyncourt and charged into the thick of the enemy. William was killed, Thomas was taken prisoner, his horse being killed on the pikes, and he himself carried off with the Scots on foot when they marched off, having utterly routed the squadron of the said two lords. Some of the English fled to the castle, others to the king's army, which having already left the road through the wood had debouched upon a plain near the water of Forth beyond Bannockburn, an evil, deep, wet marsh, where the said English army unharnessed and remained all night, having sadly lost confidence and being too much disaffected by the events of the day.

— Sir Thomas Grey, Scalacronica, translated by Herbert Maxwell

In the November after Bannockburn, Beaumont and his wife were those affected by the sentence of forfeiture passed by the Scottish parliament against all those with land and title in Scotland who continued to fight with the English. This group of nobles came to be known as "The Disinherited", and included David III Strathbogie, Beaumont's future son-in-law who claimed the Earldom of Atholl. Henceforth, Beaumont would dedicate a large part of his career to recovering his wife's Scottish lands.

For some time, Beaumont remained loyal to Edward II, fighting on his side at the Battle of Boroughbridge in 1322. However, when Edward II entered into truce negotiations with the Scots in May 1323, Beaumont, hitherto a close associate of the king, argued against any agreement which disregarded the claims of the disinherited, for whom he had become the leading spokesman. Edward and Beaumont quarraled when the latter allegedly refused to swear an oath to Edward and Hugh Despenser the Younger "to live and die with them." Beaumont was briefly imprisoned for contempt and disobedience at the Privy Council (of which he was a member), after which he retired from Court to continue his intrigues in exile, eventually joining forces with Edward's estranged wife, Queen Isabella, and her lover Roger Mortimer, 1st Earl of March.

Following the deposition of Edward II in 1327, Beaumont was initially well rewarded by the new regime of Isabella and Mortimer. However, following a failed Scottish campaign in 1328, and anxious to break the deadlock in the north, Isabella and Mortimer persuaded Parliament to accept the terms of the Treaty of Northampton, which ignored, once again, the claims of the disinherited. Many of the senior nobility repudiated what they considered to be a shameful peace; and when Henry, 3rd Earl of Lancaster rose in revolt in late 1328 he was joined by Henry Beaumont and other members of the Disinherited, including Thomas Wake, Henry Ferrers, Thomas Rosselin and David Strathbogie, the latter now married to Beaumont's daughter, Katherine. This was the nucleus of the party soon to be prominent supporters of Edward Balliol, the son of the former King John Balliol. The rising was short-lived; and when Lancaster submitted in January 1329, Wake and Strathbogie also made their peace. Not so Henry Beaumont, who was specifically excluded from pardon, going into exile to plot Mortimer's downfall.

When Edmund of Woodstock, 1st Earl of Kent was arrested in March 1330 and charged with conspiring to restore Edward II, whom he believed was still alive, he alleged at his trial that Beaumont had met him in Paris and told him that his plot would be supported from Scotland by the armed intervention of Donald, Earl of Mar, a personal friend of the ex-king. Kent was executed and Beaumont would never be allowed to return to England while Mortimer and Isabella held on to power.

== Service with Edward Balliol and later career ==
Following Edward III's overthrow of Mortimer in 1330, Beaumont was allowed to return to England. Edward III, for the time being at least, maintained the peace with Scotland, but he was known to share the views of many of his countrymen that Northampton was a turpis pax—a shameful peace. In 1330, Edward III would make a formal request to the Scottish Crown to restore the lands of Beaumont's earldom to him, which was refused.. Consequently, Beaumont and the other Disinherited sought to take advantage of the minority of Robert the bruce's infant son, David II and began making arrangements for a plan to make Edward Balliol king of Scotland and have their lands restored.

Beaumont persuaded Balliol to come to England in 1331, and played a key role in coordinating the campaign into Scotland the following year which culminated in Balliol's victory at the Battle of Dupplin Moor. Building on this victory, the army advanced on Scone, where Edward Balliol was crowned King of Scots on 24 September. Beaumont attended the coronation and Balliol's first parliament in October, in which the Disinherited were officially restored to their lands. The priors of St. Andrews wrote of the lordship of Edward Balliol and Henry Beaumont, and their inability to collect the dues from their church at Fordun 'for fear of the said Lord Henry.'

Beaumont would spend the next few years campaigning in Scotland. In January 1333 Edward III finally dropped the pretence of neutrality: Edward Balliol was formally recognised as King of Scotland and promised military aid. Subsidies were now paid to Balliol and the others, to help prepare for a fresh invasion. Beaumont was present in the Battle of Halidon Hill, in which the Scots were defeated once again. Following the battle, Balliol granted the earldom of Moray to Beaumont. Afterward, he was able to return to Buchan where, according to Andrew Wyntoun, he repaired the old Comyn stronghold of Dundarg on the Aberdeenshire coast in 1333/4, which had been destroyed by Robert Bruce in 1308:

The Beaumont went intil Buchan; And there, Dundarg of lime and stane He made stoutly, and therin lay.

Despite the successive military victories, Balliol and his supporters position was weakened when they came into conflict on a dispute over the estates of Alexander de Mowbray. Alexander's brother, John Mowbray had been killed at Annan in 1332; Beaumont, Strathbogie, and Richard Talbot wished to exclude Alexander from his brother's inheritance and instead let it pass to his nieces. Balliol initially favoured Mowbray's claims, causing Beaumont to retire to his lands in Buchan in defiance. He soon was besieged in Dundarg by Sir Andrew de Moray of Avoch and Bothwell, the new Guardian of Scotland. Under continual attack, and running short of supplies, he was compelled to surrender on 23 December 1334. After a brief imprisonment, he was ransomed and returned to England in time for the summer campaign of 1335. When he came back to Scotland it is uncertain if he ever saw Buchan again. Dundarg was destroyed for the second and last time in its history.

Beuamont's son-in-law, David Strathbogie, was killed at the Battle of Culblean in 1335. Not only was this a severe blow to Balliol's kingdom, but Andrew Moray thence proceeded to besiege Beaumont's daughter Katherine (Strathbogie's widow) at Lochindorb. Edward III and Balliol once more launched a campaign, accompanied by Beaumont, and advanced into Aberdeenshire in the summer of 1336. Katherine was duly rescued, while the north-east was subject to widespread destruction. It was in this season that Henry Beaumont embarked on his last actions in Scotland, by seeking vengeance against those whom he held responsible for the death of his son-in-law. The Pluscarden Chronicle describes his actions thus: Henry Beaumont, to avenge his son-in-law, the Earl of Atholl, who was slain at Culblean, either cast into prison or put to cruel death all who had taken part in the engagement in which he was slain; whereby much innocent blood was shed.

Rather than return to Scotland with Balliol for another campaign, Beaumont accompanied King Edward to the Low Countries in 1338, in what would be the earliest campaigns of the Hundred Years' War. Beaumont died there in 1340. His son, John, never claimed the lost earldom of Buchan. When Beaumont's wife, Alice, died in 1349 the Comyn line of Buchan, which stretched back to the early thirteenth century, finally came to an end.

By the time an Inquisition was held to assess his lands in April 1340, Henry was holding a large amount of land in Lincolnshire as well as smaller areas in Leicestershire, Northumberland and Yorkshire.

== Marriage and children ==
Arms of Comyn: Azure, three garbs or. As quartered on Garter stall plate of John Beaumont, 4th Baron Beaumont (1361–1396), KG

Shortly before 14 July 1310 Henry married Alice Comyn, Countess of Buchan, the niece and heiress of John Comyn, Earl of Buchan. He was recognised as Earl of Buchan jure uxoris. By Alice Comyn he had children including:

- John de Beaumont, 2nd Lord Beaumont (c.25 December 1317 or 30 November 1318), who married Eleanor of Lancaster, great-granddaughter of King Henry III and a sister of Henry of Grosmont.
- Elizabeth Beaumont (c. 1320 – 1400) who married Nicholas Audley, 3rd Baron Audley (1328–1391), without children.
- Thomas de Beaumont (c.30 November 1324)
- Katherine de Beaumont, married David III Strathbogie, titular Earl of Atholl, 1st Lord Strathbogie
- Isabel de Beaumont, married Henry of Grosmont, 1st Duke of Lancaster
- Joan de Beaumont, who ("it is said") married Fulk VII FitzWarin, 3rd Baron FitzWarin (died 1349), of Whittington Castle in Shropshire and Alveston in Gloucestershire.

== Sources ==
- Balfour-Melville, E. W. M., Edward III and David II, 1954.
- Brut, or the Chronicles of England, ed. F. W. D. Brie, 1906.
- Brown, C. "The Second Scottish War of Independence", 2001.
- Pluscarden, the Book of, ed. F. J. H. Skene 1880.
- Campbell, T., England, Scotland and the Hundred Years War, in Europe in the late Middle Ages, ed. R. Highfield et al., 1970.
- Cokayne, George Edward (1926). The Complete Peerage (2nd ed.). London: St. Catherine Press.
- Jambeck, Karen K. (1996). "Patterns of Women's Literary Patronage: England, 1200-ca. 1475". In McCash, June Hall (ed.). The Cultural Patronage of Medieval Women. University of Georgia Press. pp. 228–265. ISBN 9780820317021.
- Scalacronica; The reigns of Edward I, Edward II and Edward III as Recorded by Sir Thomas Gray. Translated by Maxwell, Herbert. Glasgow: James Maclehose & Sons. 1907.
- Nicolson, R., Edward III and the Scots, 1965.
- Perry, Guy (2018). The Briennes: The Rise and Fall of a Chempenois Dynasty in the Age of the Crusades, c. 950–1356. Cambridge University Press. ISBN 978-1-107-19690-2.
- Ramsay, J. H., The Genesis of Lancaster, 1307-99, 1913.
- Ridpath, G., The Border History of England and Scotland, 1810.
- Richardson, Douglas, Plantagenet Ancestry, Baltimore, Md., 2004, p. 83–4, ISBN 0-8063-1750-7
- Webster, B., Scotland Without a King, 1329-1341, in Medieval Scotland: Crown, Lordship and Community, ed. A. Grant and K. J. Stringer, 1993.
- Wyntoun, Andrew, The Original Chronicle of Scotland, ed. N. Denholm Young, 1957.

Peerage of England
| New creation | Baron Beaumont; 1309–1340 | Succeeded by John Beaumont |
