= Alexander de Mowbray =

14th-century Scottish noble

- Noble family: Mowbray family

Alexander de Mowbray was a 14th-century Scottish noble. Part of the disinherited, he took part in the Second War of Scottish Independence on the side of Edward Balliol, attempting to regain his ancestral lands, before joining the Guardian of Scotland, Andrew Moray in besieging Henry Beaumont at Dundarg Castle.

== Life ==
Claiming his ancestral lands over the rights of his elder brother John's heiresses, he was successful in obtaining those rights in a judgement by Edward Balliol. A dispute over the estates erupted with Henry de Beaumont, who withdrew from Balliol's court to Dundarg. Balliol reversed his decision with Alexander being dismissed from Balliol's service. Andrew Moray and Alexander marched into Buchan, and besieged Beaumont in his castle of Dundarg in late 1334. Beaumont was compelled to surrender, but was permitted to return to England.
