= David II Strathbogie, Earl of Atholl =

Scottish Earl

Sir David II Strathbogie (died 28 December 1326) was Earl of Atholl, Constable of Scotland, and Chief Warden of Northumberland.

The eldest son and heir of John Strathbogie, Earl of Atholl by his wife Marjory (or Margaret) daughter of Donald, 10th Earl of Mar, Sir David was a prisoner in England in 1300. He succeeded his father in 1306 and was restored to his earldom and Scottish estates in 1307 by the surrender of them by Ralph de Monthermer, to whom was paid a large sum of money.

That year he rebelled against Robert the Bruce who banished him, forfeiting his office, title, and lands, the latter being given to Sir Neil Campbell. Strathbogie received three manors in Norfolk as a compensation for his Scottish possessions. In 1321, he was granted the feudal barony of Chilham, Kent, which had belonged to his father and grandmother. In 1322 he was summoned to the English parliament as Lord Strathbogie. In that year he was appointed custos of Northumberland, responsible for defence against Scottish raids. His wife was co-heiress in 1324 to her uncle, Aymer de Valence, knt., Earl of Pembroke, by which she inherited Mitford Castle and manor, the manor of Ponteland, and lands in Little Eland, Northumberland, and the manor of Foston (in Foston on the Wolds), Yorkshire.

In 1325 he was commander of the English troops in Gascony.

== Marriage ==
Strathbogie married Joan, elder daughter of Sir John III Comyn, Lord of Badenoch, Joint Guardian of Scotland, by his spouse Joan (1292–1326), daughter of Sir William de Valance, Lord of Pembroke, Valence, Montignac, Bellac, etc., half-brother of King Henry III of England (both had the same mother, Isabella, Countess of Angoulême).

His claim to the earldom of Atholl was maintained by his eldest son and heir, David III Strathbogie, titular Earl of Atholl, a leading supporter of Edward Balliol.

His second son, Sir Aymer de Strathbogie, Knt., of Felton, Jesmond, Ponteland, and Tarcet (in Thormeburre), was Knight of the Shire for Northumberland (as Adomar de Atholl) in 1381. Sir Aymer married Mary, said to be a daughter of Walter Steward. They are buried in the chancel of the Holy Trinity of St. Andrew's, Newcastle-upon-Tyne (brass now destroyed) and left children.
