= Dundarg Castle =

Ruined castle in Scotland

- near New Aberdour, Aberdeenshire in Scotland
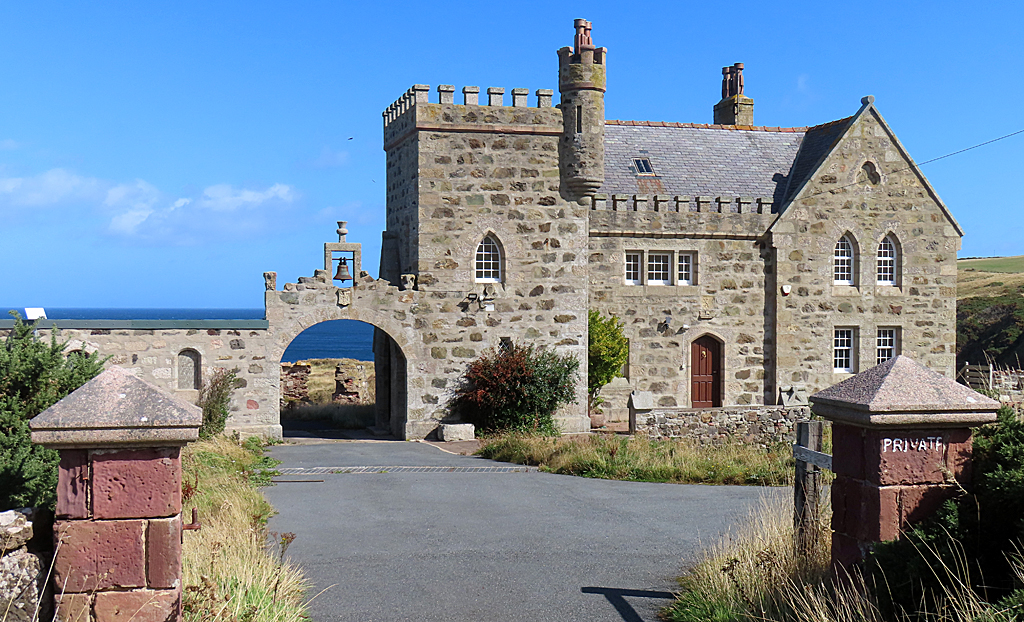
- The modern house in 2025

Location
- Coordinates: 57°40′26.59″N 2°10′39.03″W

Site history
- Built: 13th century

Scheduled monument
- Official name: Dundarg Castle
- Type: Prehistoric domestic and defensive: fort (includes hill fort and promontory fort), Secular: castle
- Designated: 8 June 1964
- Reference no.: SM2450

Dundarg Castle is a ruined castle about 2 kilometres (1.2 mi) north-northeast of New Aberdour, Aberdeenshire, Scotland, built within the ramparts of an earlier Iron Age promontory fort. It was described by W. Douglas Simpson as one of the nine castles of the Knuckle, referring to the rocky headland of North-East Aberdeenshire, and by Charles McKean as "Scotland's answer to Tintagel". It became a small Celtic monastery for a period.

== Structure ==
The site consists of a triangle of gently sloping ground flanked by steep slopes on all sides, linked to a flat-topped elongated promontory extending to the north-east, surrounded by 20 metres (66 ft) high sandstone cliffs. Its name comes from the Gaelic dun dearg, meaning red fort or castle, referring to the colour of the sandstone.

== History ==
The 10th-century Book of Deer records the existence of a cathair or fortified place at Aberdour.

It was built in the 13th century by the Comyn family, but was dismantled, probably by Robert the Bruce, in 1308. It was rebuilt in 1334 by Alice Comyn, Countess of Buchan and her husband Henry de Beaumont, but slighted almost immediately, after a famous siege by Sir Andrew Moray. Many medieval objects providing evidence of this double destruction were found in excavations in 1911-12 and 1950-51, led by W. Douglas Simpson.

The only substantial part of the castle remaining is the inner gatehouse, which survives to a height of about 18 feet (5.5 m). The upper part was rebuilt in the middle of the 16th century, probably following the Coastal Defence Commission of 1550, and there is some evidence that it was provided with gunloops at that time. The site was finally abandoned in the mid-17th century. A house was built on part of the site in 1938, reputedly by and for Wing Commander David Vaughan Carnegie, using stone from the former Aberdour Free Church.

The castle and promontory fort are protected as a scheduled monument, while the modern house is a category B listed building.

== Gallery ==
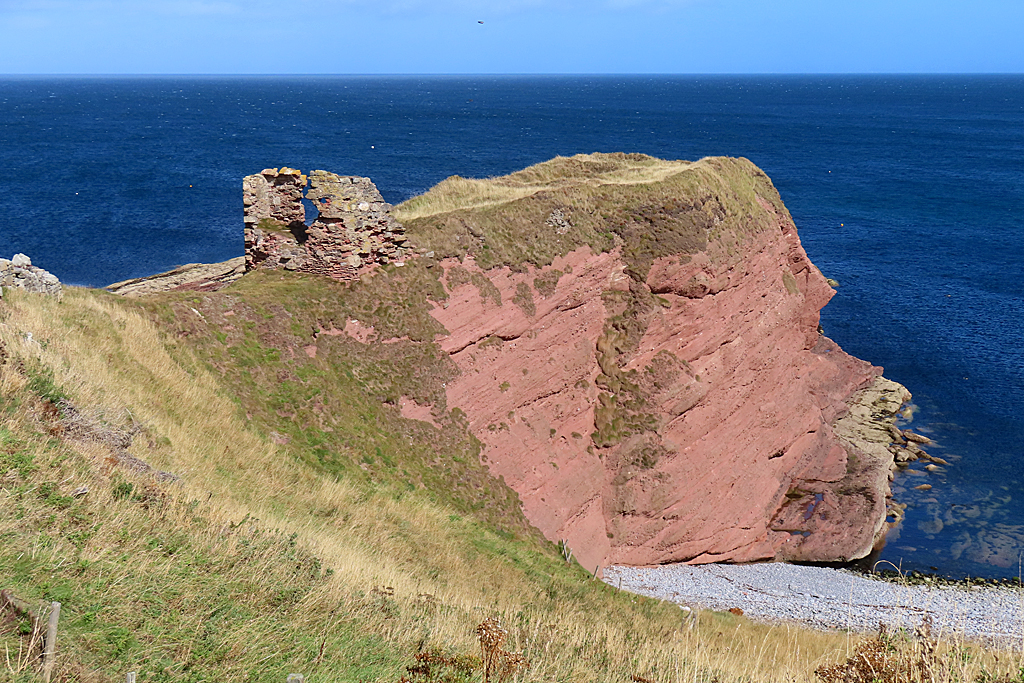
The ruins (2025)

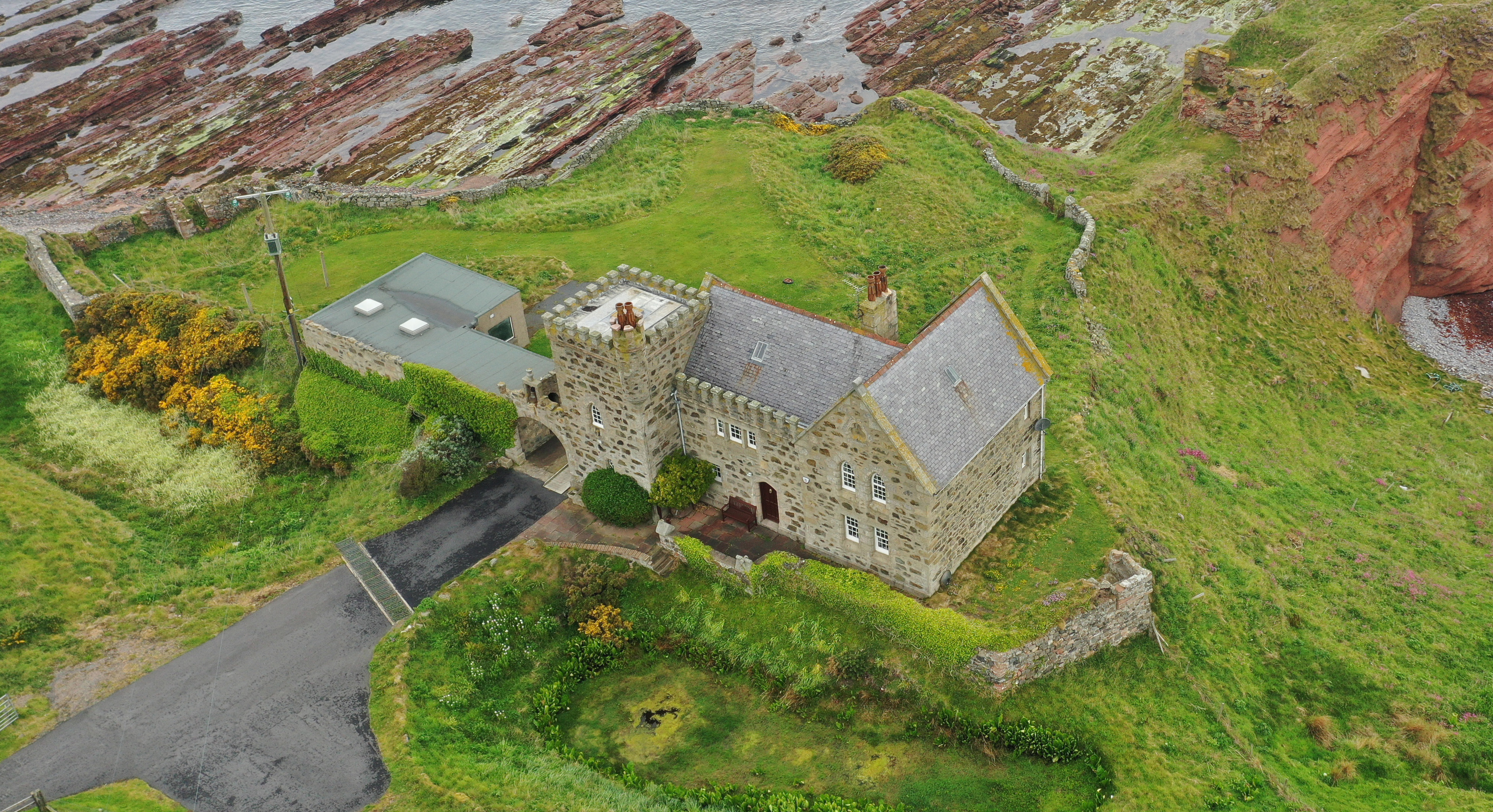
Seen from above (2019)

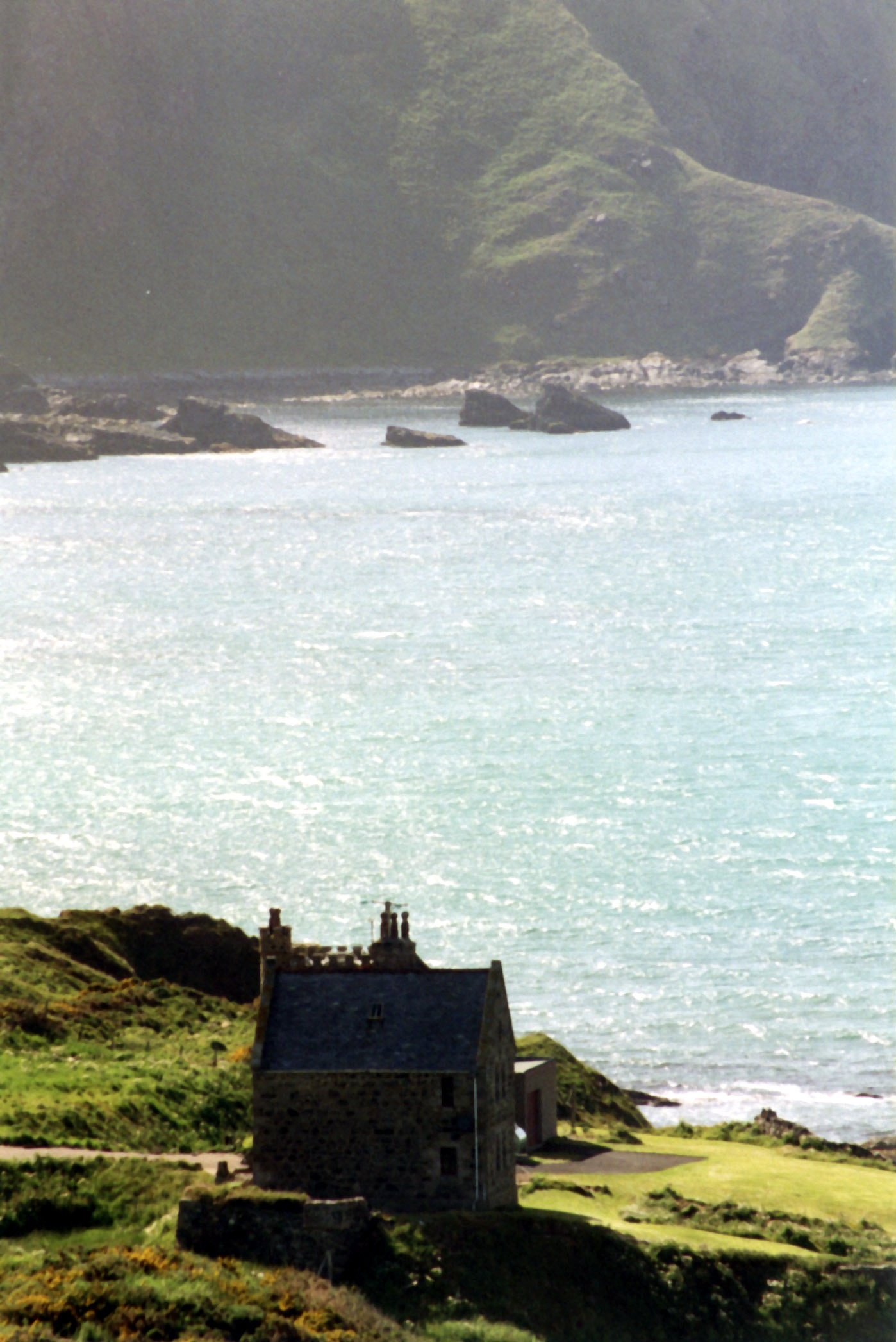
The modern house in 2001

== Bibliography ==
- Beveridge, W. (1912). "Excavations at Dundargue Castle" (PDF). Proceedings of the Society of Antiquaries of Scotland. 48: 184–91.
- Fojut, N.; Love, P. (1983). "The defences of Dundarg Castle, Aberdeenshire" (PDF). Proceedings of the Society of Antiquaries of Scotland. 113: 449–56.
- Rees, S.E. (1983). "A wooden ard-share from Dundarg, Aberdeenshire, with a note on other wooden plough pieces" (PDF). Proceedings of the Society of Antiquaries of Scotland. 113: 457–63.
- "Dundarg Castle". Canmore. Historic Environment Scotland.
- Simpson, W. D. (1954) Dundarg Castle. Aberdeen University.
- Simpson, W. D. (1960) 'Dundarg Castle reconsidered', Transactions of the Buchan Field Club 17(4), pp. 9–25.
