= Weardale campaign =

1327 Scottish Independence battle

Coordinates: 54°44′28″N 2°06′36″W

- Part of the First War of Scottish Independence
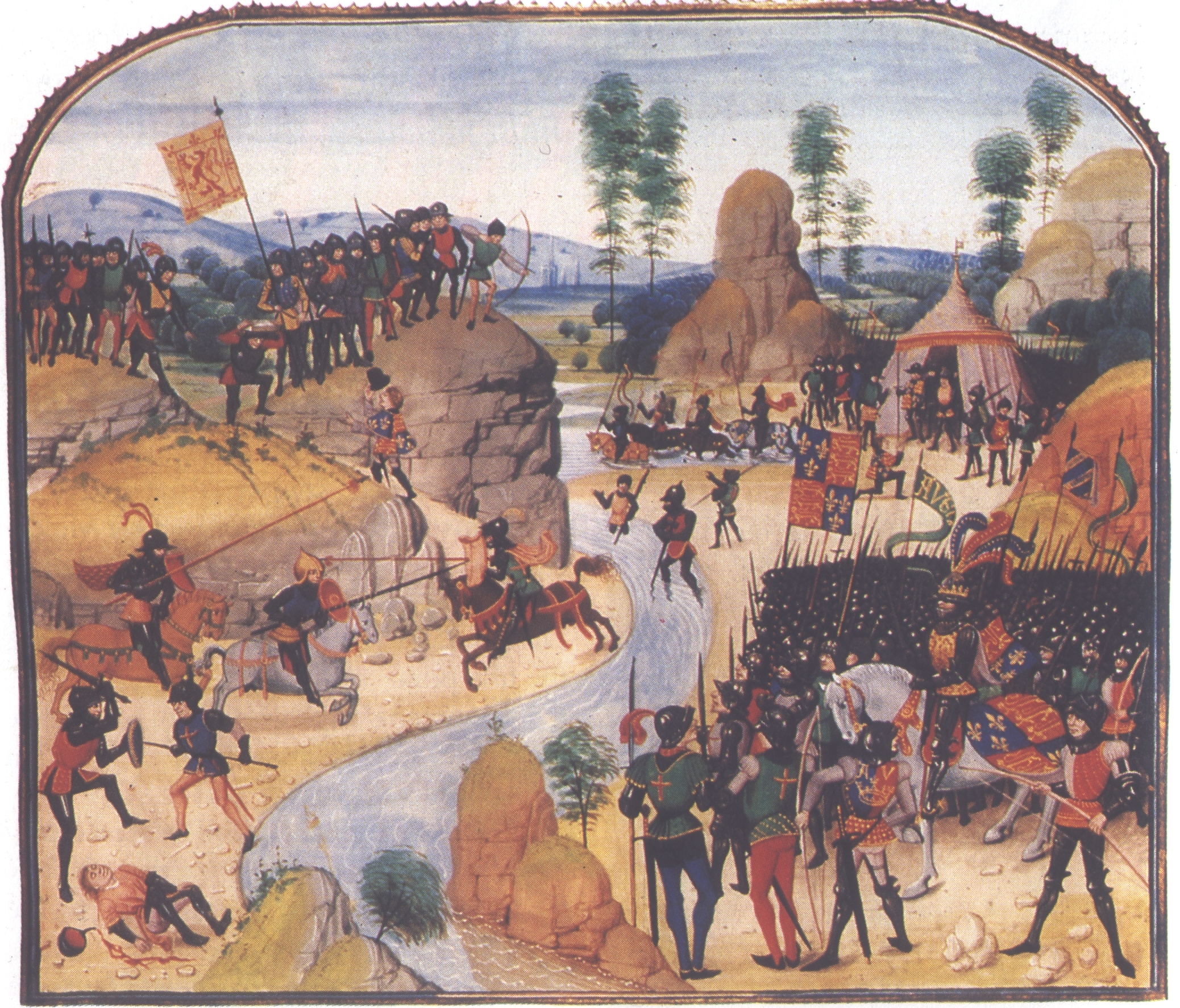
- Battle of Stanhope Park
Date	July – August 1327
Location	Weardale, England
Result	Scottish victory

Belligerents
Scotland	England

Commanders and leaders
James, Lord of Douglas; Thomas, Earl of Moray; Donald, Earl of Mar	Edward III; Roger Mortimer

Strength
10,000	Unknown

Casualties and losses
Unknown	Unknown

The Weardale campaign, part of the First War of Scottish Independence, occurred during July and August 1327 in Weardale, England. A Scottish force under James, Lord of Douglas, and the earls of Moray and Mar faced an English army commanded by Roger, Lord Mortimer of Wigmore, accompanied by the newly crowned Edward III.

In 1326 the English king Edward II was deposed by a rebellion led by his wife, Isabella, and her lover, Mortimer. England had been at war with Scotland for 30 years and the Scots took advantage of the chaotic situation to launch large raids into England. Seeing opposition to the Scots as a way of legitimising their position, Isabella and Mortimer prepared a large army to oppose them. In July 1327 this set off from York to trap the Scots and force them to battle. After two weeks of poor supplies and bad weather the English confronted the Scots when the latter deliberately gave away their position.

The Scots occupied an unassailable position immediately north of the River Wear. The English declined to attack it and the Scots declined to fight in the open. After three days the Scots moved overnight to an even stronger position. The English followed them and, that night, a Scottish force crossed the river and successfully raided the English camp, penetrating as far as the royal pavilion. The English believed that they had the Scots surrounded and were starving them out, but on the night of 6 August the Scottish army escaped and marched back to Scotland. The campaign was ruinously expensive for the English. Isabella and Mortimer were forced to negotiate with the Scots and in 1328 the Treaty of Edinburgh–Northampton was signed, recognising Scottish sovereignty.

== Background ==
The First War of Scottish Independence between England and Scotland began in March 1296, when Edward I of England (r. 1272–1307) stormed and sacked the Scottish border town of Berwick as a prelude to his invasion of Scotland. By 1323 the English, now ruled by Edward II, had been completely expelled from Scotland. Robert Bruce was securely on the Scottish throne and had carried out several major raids deep into England. In May a 13-year truce was agreed. Despite this, Scottish raids continued, as did English piracy against Scottish shipping. To add to Edward II's embarrassments, when an Anglo-French war broke out in Aquitaine in 1323 the English were defeated and forced to agree a humiliating peace in 1325.

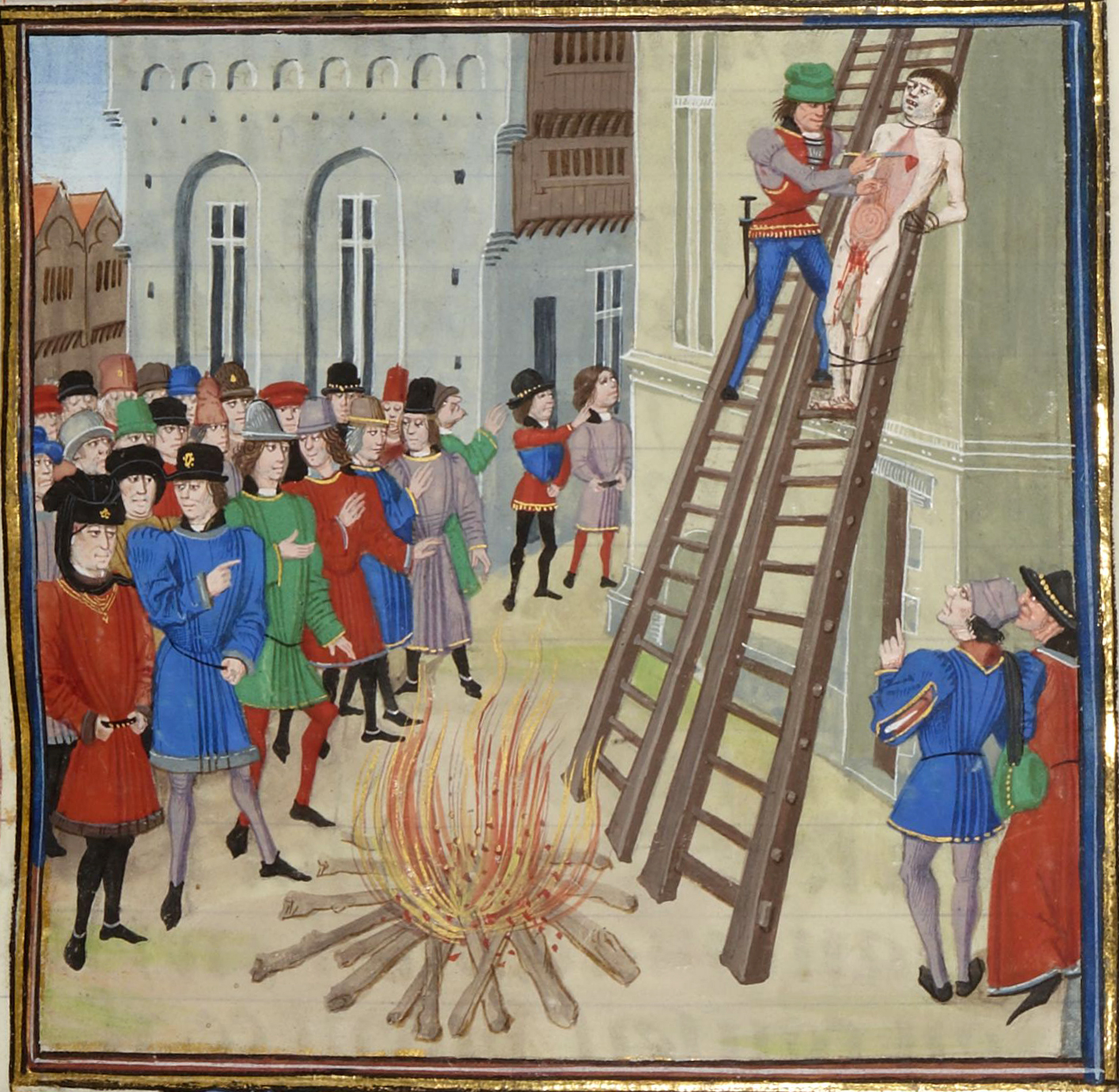
Execution of Hugh Despenser

By February 1326, it was clear that Edward II's wife, Isabella, had taken the exiled Roger Mortimer as a lover. Living in Paris, and encouraged by the French court, they became the centre of English opposition to Edward II. In April the Scots agreed a military alliance with the French. In September Isabella, Mortimer and the heir to the throne – thirteen-year-old Prince Edward – landed in Suffolk. Edward II's authority collapsed, Isabella's faction took over the administration with the support of the Church, and Edward II was taken prisoner in November. Edward II's treasurer, Walter de Stapledon, was killed by a mob in St Paul's Cathedral; his main counsellor, Hugh Despenser, was declared a traitor and sentenced to be drawn, hanged, disembowelled, castrated and quartered – his head was displayed at one of London's gates; Robert Baldock, his chancellor, died in prison; and the Earl of Arundel was beheaded.

Under threat of having his son disinherited, Edward II abdicated in January 1327. A few days later Prince Edward was crowned as Edward III. It was understood that his mother and her lover intended the young Edward to be their puppet. With Edward II deposed, Isabella and Mortimer lacked legitimacy and popular support. The Scots saw opportunity in the chaos south of the border; as Edward III was being crowned a Scottish force was besieging the English-held border castle of Norham. Edward II had refused to recognise Robert Bruce as king of Scotland, and the Scottish raids were intended to exert pressure on the English to acknowledge his kingship. Ending the devastating Scottish raids by defeating the Scots in battle would aid in legitimising Isabella and Mortimer's de facto rule. For Bruce, demonstrating that the English were unable to end the raids would potentially put the Scottish king in a position to dictate a peace. Under these pressures, the truce collapsed and both sides prepared for full-scale war.

== Prelude ==
Some of the places referred to in the text on a map of north-east England, showing modern boundaries
Key:
- – fortified town
- – other locations
- – site of the main confrontation

Bruce was immobilised with an unspecified illness during 1327. This did not prevent the Scots from maintaining the pressure on England. On 15 June a large Scottish force raided across the border. In July a Scottish army re-entered England. It is reported to have consisted of 10,000 mounted men and it was led by Donald, Earl of Mar, Thomas, Earl of Moray, and James, Lord of Douglas. It had little in the way of supply or baggage trains, instead dispersing over a wide area to forage. This was contrary to the normal military practice of the time, which stressed the benefits of concentration. These factors gave the Scots an unusual degree of operational mobility. Their scattered formation, which enabled them to advance on a front of 70 miles (110 km) or more, also made it difficult for opponents to identify their numbers, centre of operations and even direction of travel. They plundered and burnt their way south and by 5 July they had penetrated as far as Appleby.

The English had assembled an army at York, stronger and better-equipped than the Scots. This army included 780 Hainault mercenary men-at-arms. (Note: With them was the chronicler Jean le Bel, who wrote a detailed account of the campaign.) While assembling, the Hainaulters fell out with the English infantry and engaged in a running battle through York. Both suffered significant losses. The English positioned a large force of Welsh troops at Carlisle and a strong contingent of men-at-arms at Newcastle upon Tyne; it was assumed that the presence of these forces on their flanks and the difficulty of the terrain would hinder any Scottish attempt at retreat sufficiently for the main English army to force the Scots to battle. The English army at York set out on 1 July, reaching Durham on 15 July. Edward III accompanied the army as nominal commander, but exercised no authority; that was reserved for Mortimer. Isabella remained in York. From Durham the sight of smoke from burning farms indicated that at least some of the Scots were nearby.

== Campaign ==
On 16 July the English set off in battle formation and headed towards the freshest smoke plumes. No contact with the Scots was made. The procedure was repeated on 17 July with the same result. The English realised that the Scots could plunder and burn the villages while still moving faster than the English across terrain described in le Bel's eyewitness account as "savage wastes". The English instead formulated a plan to cut off the Scots. They set off well before dawn on 20 July: the men-at-arms moved mounted, as fast as they could. The baggage train was left behind and the infantry straggled after the cavalry, falling well behind. The vanguard forded the River Tyne at Haydon as night fell. The English stood-to-arms all night, anticipating a desperate Scottish assault. This did not materialise and the next morning the English were in a difficult situation. They had outrun their supplies and no food was available locally. It was also raining heavily; this continued for several days and made the Tyne unfordable. After a week the English were complaining, states le Bel, of their "discomfort and poverty" and their commanders developed a new plan.

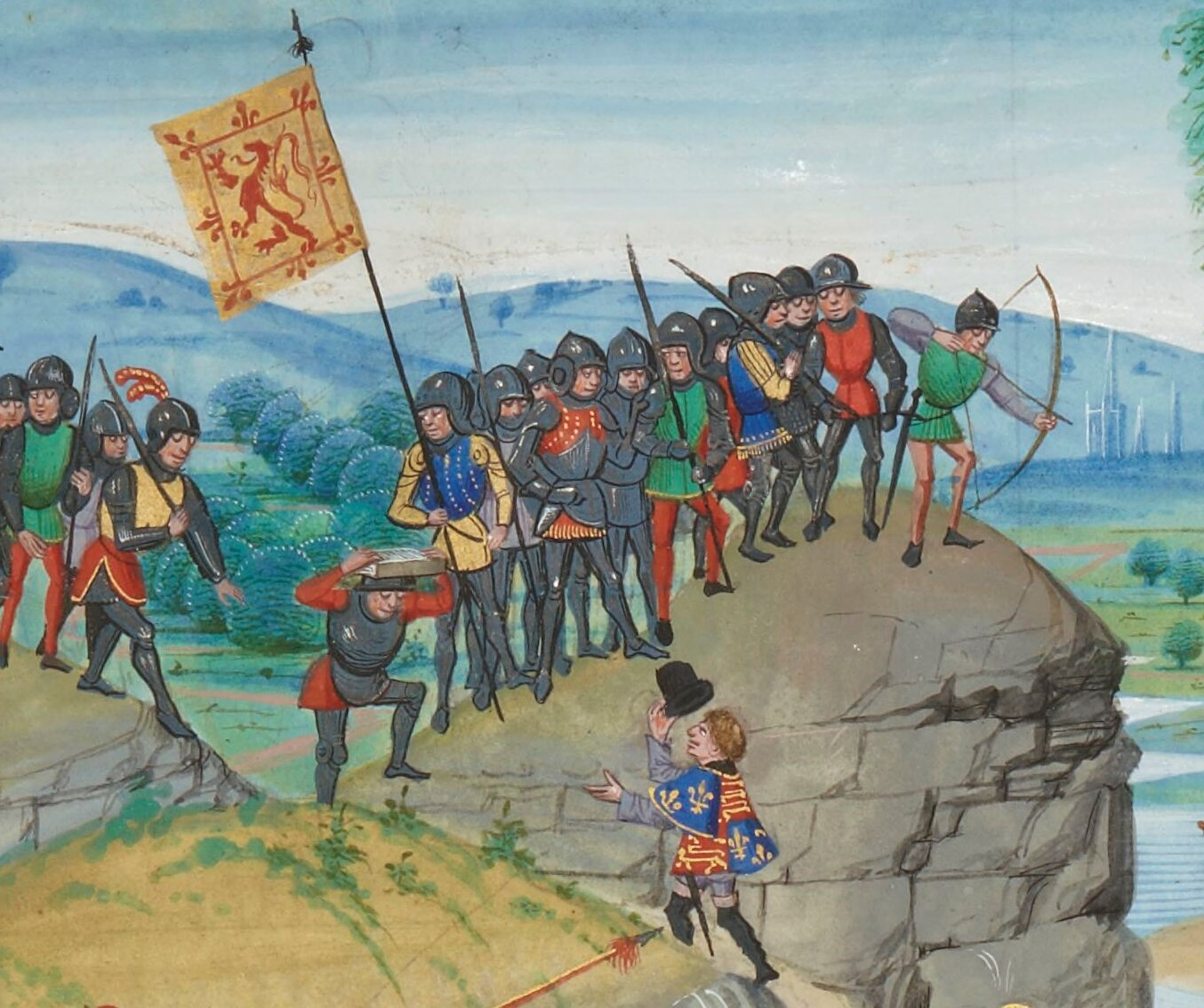
An English herald approaches the Scots.

The English sent out scouts and moved 9 miles (14 km) west to Haltwhistle, where the Tyne was fordable. The Scots were some way south of the English; they had been aware of the English army but unable to locate it. One of the English scouts was captured by the Scots, but released with a message for Edward III that the Scots were eager for battle. The freed scout then led the English army to the Scottish army's position, probably on 31 July. The Scots had established themselves in a position on the north bank of the River Wear, close to Stanhope Park. (Note: "Park" referred to the area being set aside as a deer park, an area reserved for hunting by the king or the higher nobility.) Their spearmen adopted their traditional schiltrons – tightly packed pike formations with little mobility but capable of all-round defence. They occupied rocky heights immediately overlooking the fast-flowing river. An attack on this position would be all but hopeless.

The English formed up in battle order, were addressed by Edward III and advanced slowly, hoping that the Scots would come down to fight them on the flood plain. They declined to, and Douglas declared that it was not unchivalrous for a smaller force to make the most of what advantages it had. After scouting the Scottish position, a body of English longbowmen forded the Wear upstream and began firing into the Scots from long range, hoping to make their position untenable. They were chased off by Scottish cavalry. The English then sent heralds, inviting the Scots to abandon their positions and engage in a fair and open battle. The Scots replied that they were content where they were and if the English King and his council were unhappy with the situation, the onus was on them to do something about it. The English in turn declined to attack, and remained on the south bank of the Wear, facing the Scottish positions, hoping to starve them out.

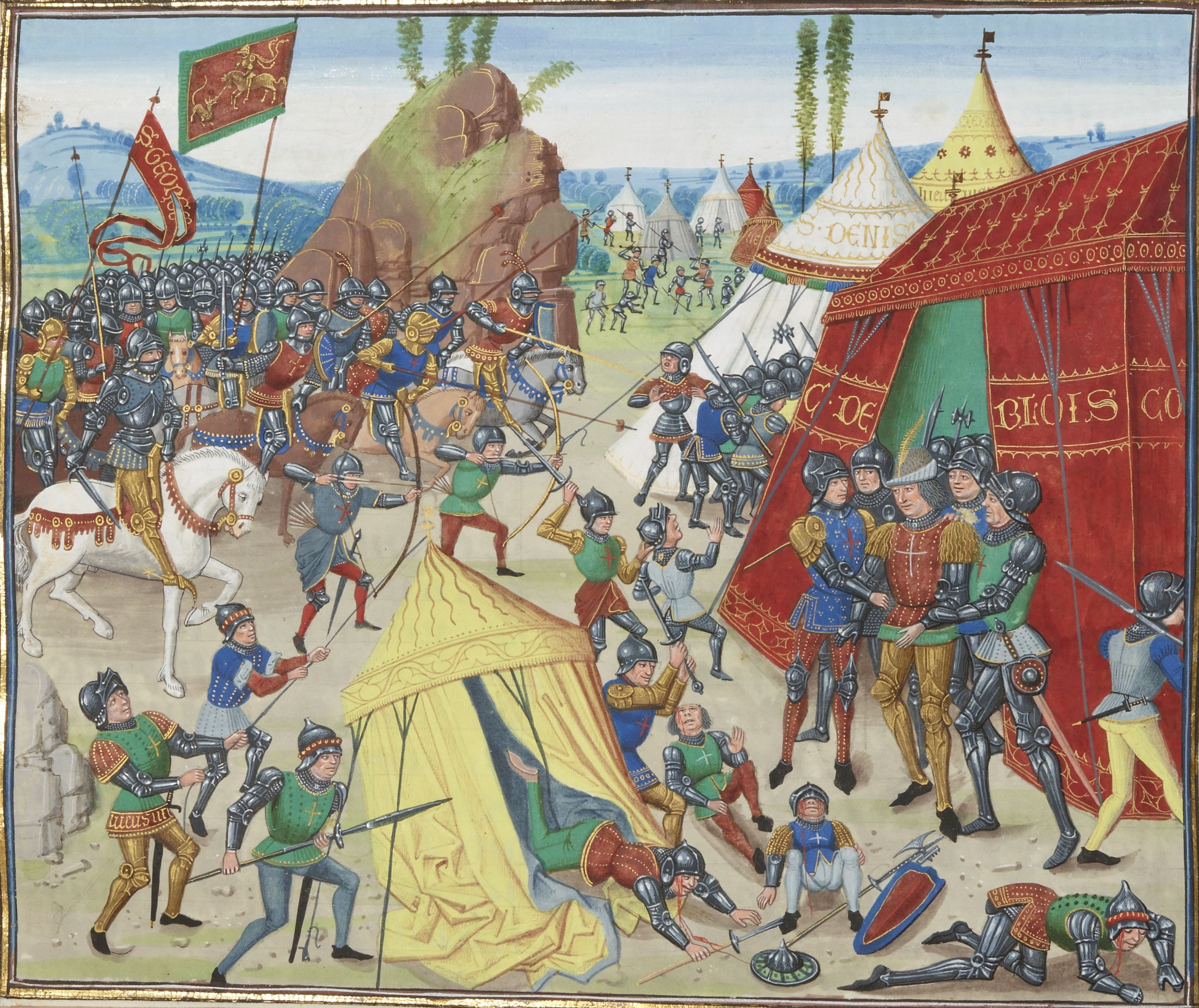
A late-medieval camp being stormed

This stand-off lasted for three days. On the night of 2/3 August the Scots decamped, moving a short way to an even stronger position, within Stanhope Park proper. The English in turn shifted camp to again face the Scots, still on the south side of the river; they feared that if they attempted a crossing in force the Scots would attack the vanguard once it was across and defeat it in detail. While the Scots' position was strong enough that a direct English assault would be obviously suicidal, the English were less secure. On the night of 3/4 August, Douglas led a night attack on the English camp, cutting guy ropes and creating panic. They penetrated to the centre of the English camp and collapsed the King's tent with a terrified Edward III inside. The Scots successfully retreated to their camp. The English were convinced that this had been an attempt by the starving Scots to cut their way out of the trap they found themselves in.

On 6 August a prisoner interrogation revealed that the Scots were preparing to move their entire army that night. The English slept fully armoured and in battle order in anticipation of a Scottish assault, with large bonfires burning to illuminate the field. The Scots, who were indeed out of food, picked their way through the swamp to the north of their position, which the English had considered impassable. With daylight they retreated north to Scotland with their plunder. Edward III wept tears of frustration at their escape. The outwitted English marched slowly back to Durham – their horses were worn out – where they were reunited with their supply wagons on 10 August. The Hainaulters were paid off and returned home.

== Aftermath ==
Contemporary English opinion of the campaign considered it "to the great shame, dishonour, and scorn of all England". The north of England was so thoroughly looted that extensive tax exemptions had to be granted. The campaign had been hugely expensive for the English: 70,000 pounds; the 780 Hainaulters alone submitted a bill for 41,000 pounds. For context, the English crown's total income each year was about 30,000 pounds. The Scottish army was reinforced later in the year and crossed the border to devastate Northumbria again. The siege of Norham Castle continued into late 1327 and the main English force in the region was unable to venture out of its base at Alnwick. If the Scots were to invade again in 1328, the English lacked the finances to raise troops to oppose them, and so Isabella and Mortimer were forced to negotiate. Edward II died in September under suspicious circumstances.

In October the victorious Bruce laid out his terms. Chief among them was the recognition of Scotland as a fully sovereign nation, with him as its king. Negotiations took place over the winter. Edward III was excluded from them, but made his objections to the process and its outcome clear. The Treaty of Edinburgh–Northampton was agreed, more or less on the terms Robert had demanded. The treaty was signed in Edinburgh by Bruce on 17 March 1328 and was ratified by the English Parliament at Northampton on 1 May. The treaty was resented in England and was widely referred to as turpis pax, the shameful peace. It ended the First Scottish War of Independence after 32 years. Robert Bruce died in 1329, leaving as his heir the five-year-old David II (r. 1329–1371). Edward III was never reconciled to the treaty. In 1330 he seized Mortimer, had him executed and established his personal rule. England and Scotland were soon at war again: in August 1332 Edward Balliol and his English supporters, backed by Edward III, won the Battle of Dupplin Moor; this marked the beginning of the Second War of Scottish Independence.

== Notes, citations and sources ==
=== Sources ===
- Barrow, G. W. S. (1965). Robert Bruce and the Community of the Realm of Scotland. Berkeley: University of California Press. ISBN 978-0-520-31634-8.
- Blumberg, Arnold (2014). "Scotland's First War of Independence". Medieval Warfare. 4 (3): 6–8. JSTOR 48578347.
- Chisholm, Hugh, ed. (1911). "Deer Park" . Encyclopædia Britannica. Vol. 7 (11th ed.). Cambridge University Press. p. 924.
- DeVries, Kelly (1998). Infantry Warfare in the Early Fourteenth Century : Discipline, Tactics, and Technology. Woodbridge, Suffolk; Rochester, NY: Boydell & Brewer. ISBN 978-0-85115-571-5.
- Haines, Roy Martin (2003). King Edward II: His Life, his Reign and its Aftermath, 1284–1330. Montreal and Kingston, Canada: McGill-Queen's University Press. ISBN 978-0-7735-3157-4.
- McNamee, Colm (1997). The Wars of the Bruces. Edinburgh: Tuckwell Press. ISBN 978-1-898410-92-8.
- Nicholson, Ranald (1974). Scotland: The Later Middle Ages. University of Edinburgh History of Scotland. Edinburgh: Oliver and Boyd. ISBN 978-0-05-002038-8.
- Ormrod, Mark (1990). The Reign of Edward III. Yale Medieval Monarchs series. New Haven: Yale University Press. ISBN 978-0-300-11910-7.
- Ormrod, W. Mark (2004). "Monarchy, Martyrdom and Masculinity: England in the Later Middle Ages". In Cullum, P. H.; Lewis, Katherine J. (eds.). Holiness and Masculinity in the Middle Ages. Cardiff, UK: University of Wales Press. pp. 174–191. ISBN 978-0-7083-1894-2.
- Phillips, Seymour (2011). Edward II. New Haven; London: Yale University Press. ISBN 978-0-300-17802-9.
- Sumption, Jonathan (1990). Trial by Battle. London: Faber and Faber. ISBN 978-0-571-20095-5.
- Rogers, Clifford (1993). "Edward III and the Dialectics of Strategy, 1327–1360". Transactions of the Royal Historical Society. 6th. 4: 83–102. doi:10.2307/3679216. JSTOR 3679216. OCLC 931311378. S2CID 163041276.
- Rogers, Clifford (2014) [2000]. War Cruel and Sharp: English Strategy under Edward III, 1327–1360. Woodbridge, Suffolk: Boydell Press. ISBN 978-0-85115-804-4.
