= Guardian of Scotland =

Scottish regents

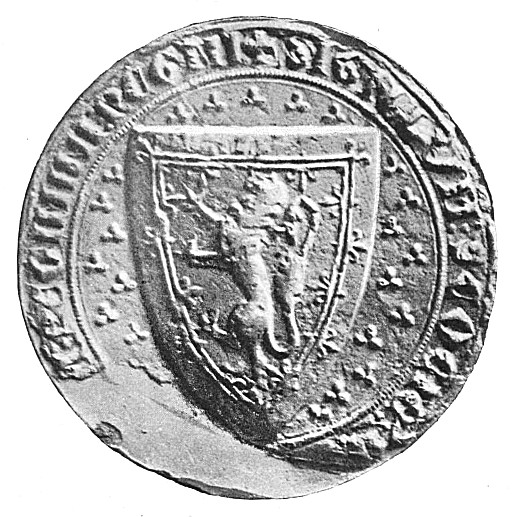
Great Seal appointed for the Government of the Realm after death of King Alexander III.

The Guardians of Scotland were regents who governed the Kingdom of Scotland from 1286 until 1292 and from 1296 until 1306. During the many years of minority in Scotland's subsequent history, there were many guardians of Scotland as part of the “community of the realm” and the post was a significant constitutional feature in the course of development for politics in the country.

== Guardians of Scotland during the First Interregnum 1286–1292 ==
The First Interregnum began upon the death of Alexander III of Scotland in 1286. Alexander's only surviving descendant was Margaret, Maid of Norway, who was a young child and living in Norway where her father Eric II was king. She was finally sent to Scotland in 1290, but she died before arriving in Scotland. The next king of Scots was not determined until completion of an arbitration in 1292.

The following persons served as guardians during the First Interregnum:

- William Fraser, Bishop of St Andrews;
- Robert Wishart, Bishop of Glasgow;
- John Comyn II of Badenoch;
- James Stewart, 5th High Steward of Scotland;
- Alexander Comyn, Earl of Buchan; (until his death in 1289)
- Donnchadh III, Earl of Fife (until his death in 1288)

In a letter (written in Old French) from the Scots Parliament of 1290, sitting at Birgham, confirming the Treaty of Salisbury, the guardians of Scotland are listed as:

"... Guillaume de Seint Andreu et Robert de Glasgu evesques, Johan Comyn et James Seneschal de Escoce, gardeins du reaume de Escoce..."

English translation: "William [Fraser] of St Andrews and Robert [Wishart] of Glasgow bishops, John Comyn and James the Steward of Scotland, guardians of the kingdom of Scotland".

- Bryan FitzAlan, Lord FitzAlan (13 June 1291 – ????)

== Guardians of Scotland during the Second Interregnum 1296–1306 ==
Guardians of the Kingdom of Scotland
Guardian (Time in office)
Sir William Wallace (1297–1298)
Sir Robert the Bruce (1298–1300)	John Comyn III (1298–1301)	—
Sir Robert the Bruce (1298–1300)	John Comyn III (1298–1301)	William de Lamberton (1299–1301)
Sir Ingram de Umfraville (1300–1301)	John Comyn III (1298–1301)	William de Lamberton (1299–1301)
Sir John de Soules (1301–1304)

== Guardians during the minority and reign of David II ==
The Guardians during the minority and reign of David II were:

- Sir Thomas Randolph, 1st Earl of Moray (1329–1332), appointed by the Act of Settlement of 1318;
- Donald, Earl of Mar (1332, for ten days);
- Sir Andrew Moray of Bothwell (1332 until captured by the English at Roxburgh Bridge in October);
- Sir Archibald Douglas (1332 until killed at the Battle of Halidon Hill in July 1333);
- Sir Andrew Moray of Bothwell for the second time (1335–1338, when he died following a brief illness);
- Robert the Steward, nephew (older in years) to David and future king of Scotland. Robert was guardian on four occasions, sometimes jointly, and latterly twice during the eleven years of the king's enforced absence as a prisoner in England after the Battle of Neville's Cross (1346–1357). He used these years to build a large power base in the country, especially north of the Forth.

== Guardians during the reign of Robert II ==
Guardians during the infirmity of King Robert II

- John Stewart, Earl of Carrick (November 1384 – December 1388);
- Robert Stewart, Earl of Fife (December 1388 – 1390).

== See also ==
- Competitors for the crown of Scotland
- List of regents in Scotland
- History of Scotland
- Politics of Scotland

== Sources ==
- Mack, James Logan (1926); The Border Line, Pub. Oliver & Boyd, pp. 317–322.
- McNaught, Duncan (1912); Kilmaurs Parish and Burgh, Pub. A.Gardner, p. 9.
