= Treaty of Edinburgh–Northampton =

1328 peace treaty ending the First War of Scottish Independence

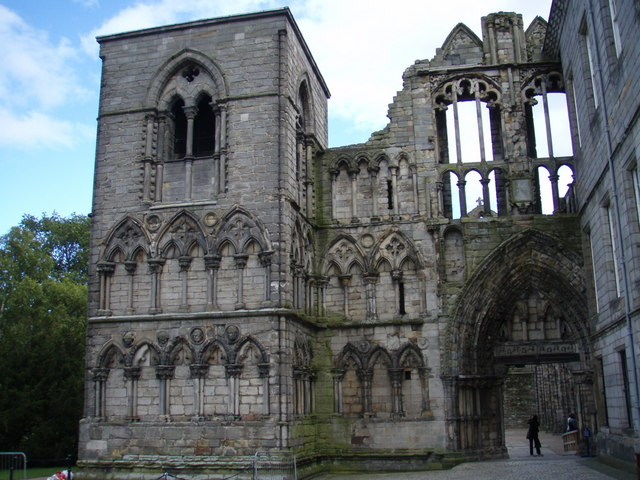
Holyrood Abbey, where the Treaty of Edinburgh-Northampton was signed in 1328.

The Treaty of Edinburgh–Northampton was a peace treaty signed in 1328 between the Kingdoms of England and Scotland. It brought an end to the First War of Scottish Independence, which had begun with the English invasion of Scotland in 1296. The treaty was signed in Edinburgh by Robert the Bruce, King of Scots, on 17 March 1328, and was ratified by the Parliament of England meeting in Northampton on 1 May.

The terms of the treaty stipulated that in exchange for £20,000 sterling, the English Crown would recognise:

- The Kingdom of Scotland as fully independent;
- Robert the Bruce, and his heirs and successors, as the rightful rulers of Scotland;
- The border between Scotland and England as that recognised under the reign of Alexander III.

One of two copies of the document, which was written in French, is held by the National Archives of Scotland in Edinburgh. However, the document does not constitute the entire peace treaty, which was contained in a number of indentures, notarial instruments and letters patent issued by Edward III and Robert I. Since none of them survives, not all details of the peace treaty are known.

== The war ==
The cause of the Wars of Scottish Independence was ultimately the uncertainty over the succession of the Scottish crown following the death of Alexander III in 1286. Edward I of England initially supported the claim of John Balliol, who was crowned King of Scots in 1292, but eventually pressed his own claim to sovereignty over Scotland. After Balliol's removal and exile, Robert the Bruce broke from the English camp and took up his own rival claim to the crown, by leading a resistance to Edward. Robert declared himself King, after killing his chief rival and cousin, and was crowned in 1306. He decisively defeated the English, under Edward II, at Bannockburn in 1314.

Peace talks were held between 1321 and 1324. Little progress was made, as the English refused to recognise Robert the Bruce as King of Scots, although a truce was agreed in 1323, to last thirteen years. Edward II claimed he adhered to this truce, but he allowed English privateers to attack Flemish vessels trading with Scotland. For example, privateers seized the Flemish vessel Pelarym, worth £2,000, and massacred all the Scots on board. Robert the Bruce demanded justice, but in vain, and so he renewed the Auld Alliance between Scotland and France, which was concluded on 26 April 1326 by the Treaty of Corbeil, which was sealed at Corbeil in France. In 1327, the Scots invaded northern England and defeated the English at the Battle of Stanhope Park in Weardale in County Durham. Before this, Bruce invaded Ulster in Ireland.

== Negotiations ==
After the debacle of the Weardale campaign, the Dowager Queen Isabella, and Earl Mortimer of March, governing England on behalf of the underage Edward III of England, began to consider peace as the only remaining option. In October 1327 they sent envoys to Scotland to open negotiations. On 1 March 1328, at a Parliament at York, Edward III issued letters patent which set out the core of the agreement. On 17 March, the negotiations ended and a formal treaty was signed in the King's Chamber of the Abbey of Holyrood, Edinburgh. The Treaty was ratified by the English Parliament at Northampton on 3 May.

== Terms ==
Isabella and Mortimer agreed in the treaty that they, in the name of the minor, King Edward III, renounced all pretensions to sovereignty over Scotland. Joanna, the six-year-old sister of Edward III, was promised in marriage to the four-year-old David, the son of Robert Bruce, and the marriage duly took place on 17 July the same year. In the quitclaim of Edward III of 1 March 1328 preceding the treaty, Edward endorsed that the Anglo–Scottish border would be maintained as it was in the reign of Alexander III of Scotland and that Scotland, so defined, "shall belong to our dearest ally and friend, the magnificent prince, Lord Robert, by God's grace illustrious King of Scotland, and to his heirs and successors, separate in all things from the kingdom of England, whole, free, and undisturbed in perpetuity, without any kind of subjection, service, claim or demand." In return, the Scots would pay £20,000 sterling to England – with a potential further £100,000 to be paid if the marriage between David and Joan failed.

As part of the treaty negotiations, Edward III agreed to return the Stone of Destiny to Scotland. This was not in the treaty, but was part of a concurrent agreement. Edward III issued a royal writ, 4 months later, on 1 July, addressed to the Abbot of Westminster, which acknowledged this agreement and ordered the Stone be taken to his mother, but it was not. This has been questioned by historian Colm McNamee, however, who writes that "the stone of Scone was to be returned to Scotland according to one report, but there is no evidence this was agreed". Eventually, 668 years later, it was returned to Scotland, arriving on 30 November 1996 at Edinburgh Castle, with the agreement that the stone is to be transported to England for use in subsequent coronations of United Kingdom monarchs. In September 2022, the BBC confirmed that this would be done for the coronation of Charles III.

== Effects ==
The treaty lasted only five years. It was unpopular with many English nobles who viewed it as humiliating – referring to it as the "Shameful Peace". As such, in 1333 it was overturned by Edward III, after he had begun his personal reign, and the Second War of Scottish Independence continued until a lasting peace was effectively established in 1357.

== The original treaty ==
The original treaty was written in French, with two copies made, top and bottom, on a single sheet (a chirograph or indenture). After the English and Scottish ambassadors verified that the copies were the same, it was cut in half across the middle with a wavy line, so that the two copies could be matched together if ever questioned. The kings did not actually sign the treaty, but signified their agreement by affixing their seals to straps that hang from the bottom of the document. (These wax seals have not survived the years, and are lost from the straps.) The bottom copy of the two originals is in the National Archives of Scotland, in Edinburgh. However, it should be remembered that this document does not constitute the entire peace treaty, which was contained in a number of indentures, notorial instruments and letters patents issued by Edward III and Robert I. All of these documents do not survive, which is why all the details of the peace treaty are not known.

== Translations ==
One partial translation of the treaty comes from the Scottish Archives for Schools:

Be it known to all those who shall see these letters that on the seventeenth day of March ... the following matters were discussed and agreed ... between the most excellent Prince, Robert, by the Grace of God, king of Scotland and ... the most excellent prince, Edward, by the Grace of God king of England.

Firstly that there be a true, final and perpetual peace between the kings, their heirs and successors and their realms and lands and their subjects and peoples ... and for the security and permanence of that peace it is settled and agreed that a marriage take place ... between David the son and heir of the king of Scotland and Joan, the sister of the king of England, who as yet are of so tender an age that they cannot make contract of matrimony ...

Item it is treated and accorded that the said kings, their heirs and successors, shall be good friends and loyal allies, and that the one shall aid the other in suitable manner as good allies: saving on the part of the king of Scotland the alliance made between him and the king of France. But if it happen that the king of Scotland ... by reason of the said alliance or for any cause whatever make war upon the said king of England...that the said king of England may make war on the foresaid king of Scotland ...

Item ... that the said king of England shall assist in good faith that the processes, if any are made in the court of Rome and elsewhere by the authority of our Holy Father the Pope against the said king of Scotland, his realm and his subjects, cleric or lay, be dismissed, and this to do and accomplish he shall send his special letters of prayer to the pope and the cardinals.

The translation was found in A Source Book of Scottish History by William Dickinson.

== See also ==
- List of treaties
- Statute of Northampton 1328
