= Maino =

Maino may refer to:

- Maino (Angola), a periodic stream
- Maino (cycling team), a cycling team that existed from 1912 to 1936
- Maino (cycling team, 1965), a cycling team that existed in 1965
- Maino (rapper), American rapper from New York
- Maino (surname), Italian surname
- Maino De Maineri (died 1368), Italian physician
- Maino Neri (1924–1995), Italian footballer and manager
