= Robert the Bruce =

King of Scotland from 1306 to 1329

Robert I
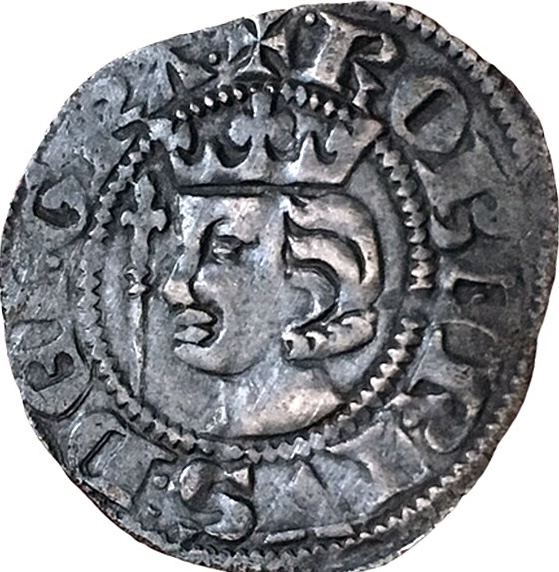
- Robert the Bruce on a penny, c. 1318

King of Scots
- Reign: 25 March 1306 – 7 June 1329
- Inauguration: 25 March 1306
- Predecessor: John (1296)
- Successor: David II
- Born: 11 July 1274 probably Turnberry Castle, Ayrshire, Scotland
- Died: 7 June 1329 (aged 54); Manor of Cardross, Dunbartonshire, Scotland
- Burial: Dunfermline Abbey (Body); Melrose Abbey (Heart); St Serf's Church, Dumbarton (Embalmed Viscera)
- Spouses: Isabella of Mar (m. 1296; died 1296) Elizabeth de Burgh (m. 1302; died 1327)
- Issue more...: Marjorie Bruce; David II of Scotland; Elizabeth Bruce; Illegitimate: Robert Bruce, Lord of Liddesdale; Niall Bruce of Carrick
- House: Bruce
- Father: Robert de Brus, 6th Lord of Annandale
- Mother: Marjorie, Countess of Carrick

Guardian of Scotland (Second Interregnum)
- In office 1298–1300 Serving with John Comyn and William de Lamberton (from 1301)
- Military career
- Conflicts: First War of Scottish Independence; Battle of Happrew; Battle of Methven; Battle of Dalrigh; Battle of Turnberry; Battle of Glen Trool; Battle of Loudoun Hill; Battle of Inverurie; Battle of the Pass of Brander; Battle of Bannockburn; Battle of Old Byland

Robert I (11 July 1274 – 7 June 1329), popularly known as Robert the Bruce (Scottish Gaelic: Raibeart am Brusach), was King of Scots from 1306 until his death in 1329. Robert led Scotland during the First War of Scottish Independence against England. He fought successfully during his reign to restore Scotland to an independent kingdom and is regarded in Scotland as a national hero. Robert was a fourth-great-grandson of King David I of Scotland, and his grandfather, Robert de Brus, 5th Lord of Annandale, was one of the claimants to the Scottish throne during the "Great Cause".

As Earl of Carrick, Robert the Bruce supported his family's claim to the Scottish throne and took part in William Wallace's campaign against Edward I of England. Appointed in 1298 as a Guardian of Scotland alongside his chief rival for the throne, John Comyn of Badenoch, and William Lamberton, Bishop of St Andrews, Robert resigned in 1300 because of his quarrels with Comyn and the apparently imminent restoration of John Balliol to the Scottish throne. After submitting to Edward I in 1302 and returning to "the king's peace", Robert inherited his family's claim to the Scottish throne upon his father's death.

Bruce's involvement in John Comyn's murder in February 1306 led to his excommunication by Pope Clement V (although he received absolution from Robert Wishart, Bishop of Glasgow). Bruce moved quickly to seize the throne and was crowned king of Scots on 25 March 1306. Edward I's forces defeated Robert in the Battle of Methven, forcing him to flee into hiding, before re-emerging in 1307 to defeat an English army at Loudoun Hill and wage a highly successful guerrilla war against the English.

Robert I defeated his other opponents, destroying their strongholds and devastating their lands, and in 1309 held his first parliament. A series of military victories between 1310 and 1314 won him control of much of Scotland, and at the Battle of Bannockburn in 1314, Robert defeated a much larger English army under Edward II of England, confirming the re-establishment of an independent Scottish kingdom. The battle marked a significant turning point, with Robert's armies now free to launch devastating raids throughout northern England, while he also expanded the war against England by sending armies to invade Ireland, and appealed to the Irish to rise against Edward II's rule.

Despite Bannockburn and the capture of the final English stronghold at Berwick in 1318, Edward II refused to renounce his claim to the overlordship of Scotland. In 1320, the Scottish nobility submitted the Declaration of Arbroath to Pope John XXII, declaring Robert as their rightful monarch and asserting Scotland's status as an independent kingdom. In 1324, the Pope recognised Robert I as king of an independent Scotland, and in 1326, the Franco-Scottish alliance was renewed in the Treaty of Corbeil. In 1327, the English deposed Edward II in favour of his son, Edward III, and peace was concluded between Scotland and England with the Treaty of Edinburgh–Northampton in 1328, by which Edward III renounced all claims to sovereignty over Scotland.

Robert I died in June 1329 and was succeeded by his son, David II. Robert's body is buried in Dunfermline Abbey, while his heart was interred in Melrose Abbey, and his internal organs were embalmed and placed in St Serf's Church, Dumbarton.

== Early life (1274–1292) ==
=== Birth ===
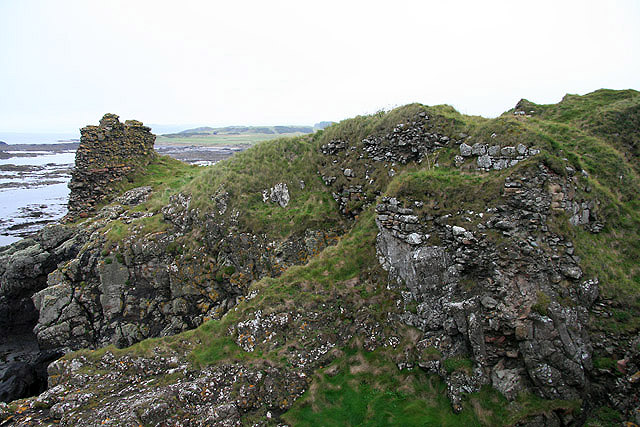
The remains of Turnberry Castle, Robert the Bruce's likely birthplace

Robert the Bruce was born on 11 July 1274. His place of birth is not known for certain. It most likely was Turnberry Castle in Ayrshire, the head of his mother's earldom, despite claims that he may have been born in Lochmaben in Dumfriesshire, or Writtle in Essex. (Note: Robert Wishart's 1310 written absolution for Robert's murder of John Comyn, describes Robert as a layman of Carrick, indicating Carrick / Turnberry was either his primary residence, or place of birth. Lochmaben has a claim, as a possession of the Bruce family, but is not supported by a medieval source. Contemporary claims of the Bruce estate at Writtle, Essex, during the coronation of Edward, have been discounted by G. W. S. Barrow.) Robert de Brus, 1st Lord of Annandale, the first of the Bruce (de Brus) line, had settled in Scotland during the reign of King David I, and was granted the Lordship of Annandale in 1124. The future king was one of ten children, and the eldest son, of Robert de Brus, 6th Lord of Annandale, and Marjorie, Countess of Carrick. From his mother, he inherited the Earldom of Carrick, and through his father, the Lordship of Annandale and a royal lineage as a fourth great-grandson of David I that would give him a claim to the Scottish throne. In addition to the lordship of Annandale, the Bruces also held lands in Aberdeenshire and Dundee, and substantial estates in England (in Cumberland, County Durham, Essex, Middlesex, Northumberland and Yorkshire) and in County Antrim in Ireland.

=== Childhood ===
Very little is known of his youth. He was probably brought up in a mixture of the Anglo-Norman culture of northern England and south-eastern Scotland, and the Gaelic culture of southwest Scotland and most of Scotland north of the River Forth. Annandale was thoroughly feudalised, and the form of Northern Middle English that would later develop into the Scots language was spoken throughout the region. Carrick was historically an integral part of Galloway, and though the earls of Carrick had achieved some feudalisation, the society of Carrick at the end of the thirteenth century remained emphatically Celtic and Gaelic speaking.

Robert the Bruce would most probably have become trilingual at an early age. He would have been schooled to speak, read and possibly write in the Anglo-Norman language of his Scots-Norman peers and the Scoto-Norman portion of his family. He would also have spoken both the Gaelic language of his Carrick birthplace and his mother's family and the early Scots language. As the heir to a considerable estate and a pious layman, Robert would also have been given working knowledge of Latin, the language of charter lordship, liturgy and prayer. This would have afforded Robert and his brothers access to basic education in the law, politics, scripture, saints' Lives (vitae), philosophy, history and chivalric instruction and romance.

Barbour reported that Robert read aloud to his band of supporters in 1306, reciting from memory tales from a twelfth-century romance of Charlemagne, Fierabras, as well as relating examples from history such as Hannibal's defiance of Rome.

As king, Robert certainly commissioned verse to commemorate Bannockburn and his subjects' military deeds. Contemporary chroniclers Jean Le Bel and Thomas Grey would both assert that they had read a history of his reign 'commissioned by King Robert himself.' In his last years, Robert would pay for Dominican friars to tutor his son, David, for whom he would also purchase books. A parliamentary briefing document of c. 1364 would also assert that Robert 'used continually to read, or have read in his presence, the histories of ancient kings and princes, and how they conducted themselves in their times, both in wartime and in peacetime; from these he derived information about aspects of his own rule.'

Tutors for the young Robert and his brothers were most likely drawn from unbeneficed clergy or mendicant friars associated with the churches patronised by their family. However, as growing noble youths, outdoor pursuits and great events would also have held a strong fascination for Robert and his brothers. They would have had masters drawn from their parents' household to school them in the arts of horsemanship, swordsmanship, the joust, hunting and perhaps aspects of courtly behaviour, including dress, protocol, speech, table etiquette, music and dance, some of which may have been learned before the age of ten while serving as pages in their father's or grandfather's household.

As many of these personal and leadership skills were bound up within a code of chivalry, Robert's chief tutor was surely a reputable, experienced knight, drawn from his grandfather's crusade retinue. This grandfather, known to contemporaries as Robert the Noble, and to history as "Bruce the Competitor", seems to have been an immense influence on the future king. Robert's later performance in war certainly underlines his skills in tactics and single combat.

The family would have moved between the castles of their lordships – Lochmaben Castle, the main castle of the lordship of Annandale, and Turnberry and Loch Doon Castle, the castles of the earldom of Carrick. A significant and profound part of the childhood experience of Robert, Edward and possibly the other Bruce brothers (Neil, Thomas and Alexander), was also gained through the Gaelic tradition of being fostered to allied Gaelic kindreds – a traditional practice in Carrick, southwest and western Scotland, the Hebrides and Ireland.

There were a number of Carrick, Ayrshire, Hebridean and Irish families and kindreds affiliated with the Bruces who might have performed such a service (Robert's foster brother is referred to by Barbour as sharing Robert's precarious existence as an outlaw in Carrick in 1307–1308). This Gaelic influence has been cited as a possible explanation for Robert the Bruce's apparent affinity for "hobelar" warfare, using smaller sturdy ponies in mounted raids, as well as for sea-power, ranging from oared war-galleys ("birlinns") to boats.

According to historians such as Barrow and Penman, it is also likely that when Robert and Edward Bruce reached the male age of consent of twelve and began training for full knighthood, they were sent to reside for a period with one or more allied English noble families, such as the de Clares of Gloucester, or perhaps even in the English royal household. Sir Thomas Grey asserted in his Scalacronica that in about 1292, Robert the Bruce, then aged eighteen, was a "young bachelor of King Edward's Chamber". While there remains little firm evidence of Robert's presence at Edward's court, on 8 April 1296, both Robert and his father were pursued through the English Chancery for their private household debts of £60 by several merchants of Winchester. This raises the possibility that young Robert the Bruce was on occasion resident in a royal centre which Edward I himself would visit frequently during his reign.

Robert's first appearance in history is on a witness list of a charter issued by Alexander Og MacDonald, Lord of Islay. His name appears in the company of the Bishop of Argyll, the vicar of Arran, a Kintyre clerk, his father, and a host of Gaelic notaries from Carrick. Robert Bruce, the king-to-be, was sixteen years of age when Margaret, Maid of Norway, died in 1290. It was also around this time that Robert would have been knighted, and he began to appear on the political stage in the Bruce dynastic interest.

=== "Great Cause" ===
Robert's mother died early in 1292. In November of the same year, Edward I of England, on behalf of the Guardians of Scotland and following the Great Cause, awarded the vacant Crown of Scotland to his grandfather's first cousin once removed, John Balliol.

Almost immediately, Robert de Brus, 5th Lord of Annandale, resigned his lordship of Annandale and transferred his claim to the Scottish throne to his son, antedating this statement to 7 November. In turn, that son, Robert de Brus, 6th Lord of Annandale, resigned his earldom of Carrick to his eldest son, Robert, the future king, to protect the Bruce's kingship claim while their middle lord (Robert the Bruce's father) now held only English lands.

While the Bruces' bid for the throne had failed, the Balliols' triumph propelled the eighteen-year-old Robert the Bruce onto the political stage in his own right.

== Earl of Carrick (1292–1306) ==
=== Bruces regroup ===
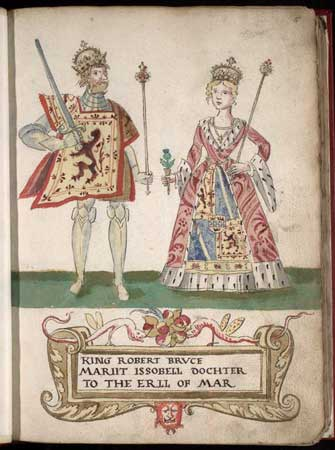
Robert the Bruce and his first wife Isabella of Mar, as depicted in the 1562 Forman Armorial

Even after John's accession, Edward continued to assert his authority over Scotland, and relations between the two kings soon deteriorated. The Bruces sided with King Edward against King John and his Comyn allies. Robert the Bruce and his father both considered John a usurper. Against the objections of the Scots, Edward I agreed to hear appeals on cases ruled on by the court of the Guardians that had governed Scotland during the interregnum. A further provocation came in a case brought by Macduff, son of Malcolm, Earl of Fife, in which Edward demanded that John appear in person before the English Parliament to answer the charges. This the Scottish king did, but the final straw was Edward's demand that the Scottish magnates provide military service in England's war against France. This was unacceptable; the Scots instead formed an alliance with France.

The Comyn-dominated council acting in the name of King John summoned the Scottish host to meet at Caddonlee on 11 March. The Bruces and the earls of Angus and March refused, and the Bruce family withdrew temporarily from Scotland, while the Comyns seized their estates in Annandale and Carrick, granting them to John Comyn, Earl of Buchan. Edward I thereupon provided a safe refuge for the Bruces, having appointed the Lord of Annandale to the command of Carlisle Castle in October 1295. At some point in early 1296, Robert married his first wife, Isabella of Mar, the daughter of Domhnall I, Earl of Mar. Isabella died shortly after their marriage, either during or shortly after the birth of their only child, Marjorie Bruce.

=== Beginning of the Wars of Independence ===
Almost the first blow in the war between Scotland and England was a direct attack on the Bruces. On 26 March 1296, Easter Monday, seven Scottish earls made a surprise attack on the walled city of Carlisle, which was not so much an attack against England as the Comyn Earl of Buchan and their faction attacking their Bruce enemies. Both his father and grandfather were at one time Governors of the Castle, and following the loss of Annandale to Comyn in 1295, it was their principal residence. Robert Bruce would have gained first-hand knowledge of the city's defences. The next time Carlisle was besieged, in 1315, Robert the Bruce would lead the attack.

Edward I responded to King John's alliance with France and the attack on Carlisle by invading Scotland at the end of March 1296 and taking the town of Berwick in a particularly bloody attack upon the flimsy palisades. At the Battle of Dunbar, Scottish resistance was effectively crushed. Edward deposed King John, placed him in the Tower of London, and installed Englishmen to govern the country. The campaign had been very successful, but the English triumph would be only temporary.

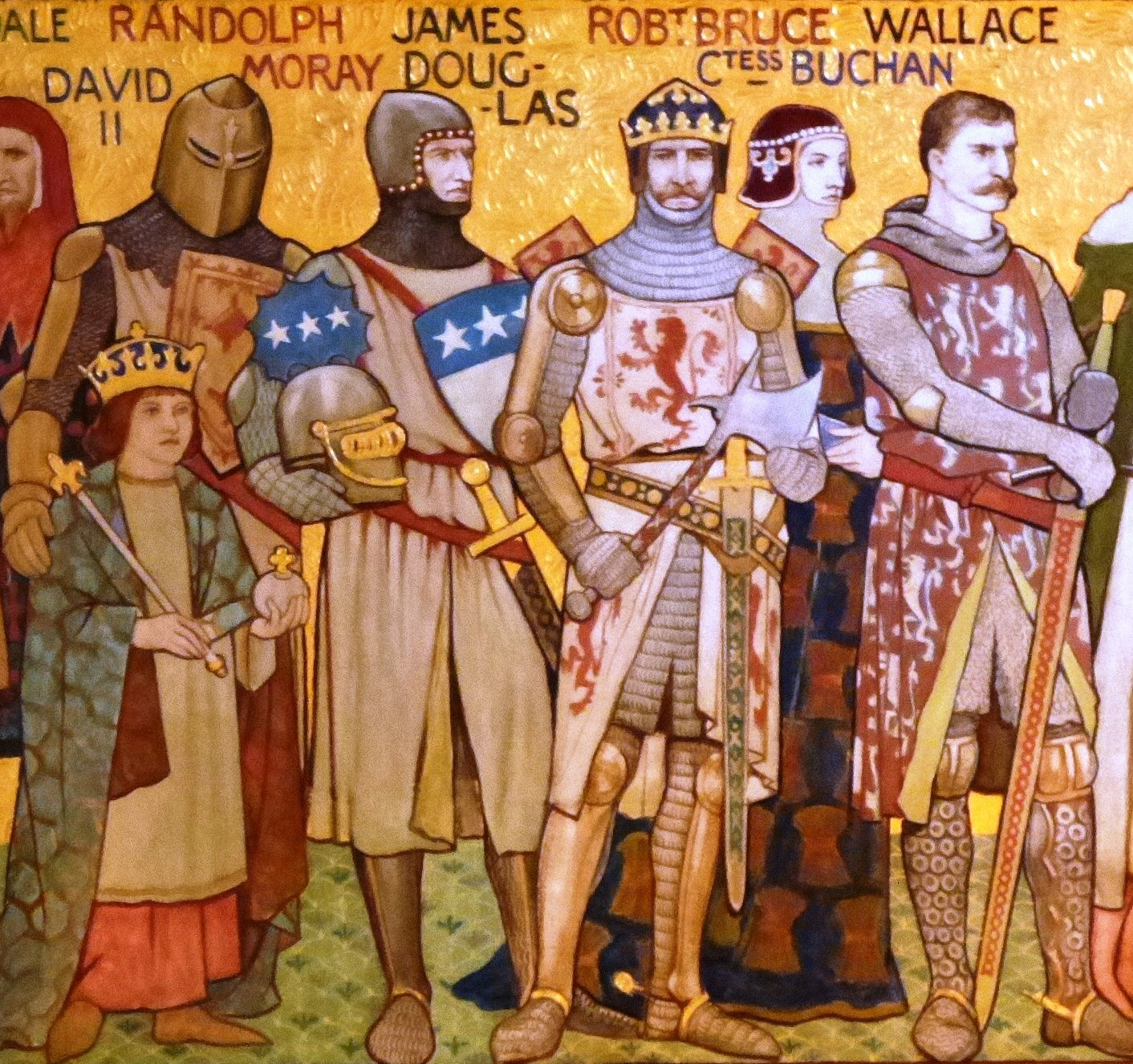
Bruce depicted alongside other notable figures in the Wars of Scottish Independence

Although the Bruces were by now back in possession of Annandale and Carrick, in August 1296 Robert Bruce, Lord of Annandale, and his son, Robert Bruce, Earl of Carrick and future king, were among the more than 1,500 Scots at Berwick who swore an oath of fealty to King Edward I of England. When the Scottish revolt against Edward I broke out in July 1297, James Stewart, 5th High Steward of Scotland, led into rebellion a group of disaffected Scots, including Robert Wishart, Bishop of Glasgow, Macduff of Fife, and the young Robert Bruce. The future king was now twenty-two, and in joining the rebels he seems to have been acting independently of his father, who took no part in the rebellion and appears to have abandoned Annandale once more for the safety of Carlisle. It appears that Robert Bruce had fallen under the influence of his grandfather's friends, Wishart and Stewart, who had inspired him to resistance. With the outbreak of the revolt, Robert left Carlisle and made his way to Annandale, where he called together the knights of his ancestral lands and, according to the English chronicler Walter of Guisborough, addressed them thus:

No man holds his own flesh and blood in hatred and I am no exception. I must join my own people and the nation in which I was born. I ask that you please come with me and you will be my councillors and close comrades.

Urgent letters were sent ordering Bruce to support Edward's commander, John de Warenne, 6th Earl of Surrey (to whom Bruce was related), in the summer of 1297; but instead of complying, Bruce continued to support the revolt against Edward I. That Bruce was in the forefront of inciting rebellion is shown in a letter written to Edward by Hugh Cressingham on 23 July 1292, which reports the opinion that "if you had the earl of Carrick, the Steward of Scotland and his brother ... you would think your business done". On 7 July, Bruce and his friends made terms with Edward by a treaty called the Capitulation of Irvine. The Scottish lords were not to serve beyond the sea against their will and were pardoned for their recent violence in return for swearing allegiance to King Edward. The Bishop of Glasgow, James the Steward, and Sir Alexander Lindsay became sureties for Bruce until he delivered his infant daughter Marjorie as a hostage, which he never did.

When King Edward returned to England after his victory at the Battle of Falkirk, the Bruce's possessions were excepted from the Lordships and lands that Edward assigned to his followers. The reason for this is uncertain, though Fordun records Robert fighting for Edward, at Falkirk, under the command of Antony Bek, Bishop of Durham, Annandale and Carrick. This participation is contested as no Bruce appears on the Falkirk roll of nobles present in the English army, and two 19th Century antiquarians, Alexander Murison and George Chalmers, have stated that Bruce did not participate, and in the following month decided to lay waste to Annandale and burn Ayr Castle, to prevent it being garrisoned by the English.

=== Guardian ===
William Wallace resigned as Guardian of Scotland after his defeat at the Battle of Falkirk. He was succeeded by Robert Bruce and John Comyn as joint Guardians, but they could not see past their personal differences. As a nephew and supporter of King John, and as someone with a serious claim to the Scottish throne, Comyn was Bruce's enemy. In 1299, William Lamberton, Bishop of St. Andrews, was appointed as a third, neutral Guardian to try to maintain order between Bruce and Comyn. The following year, Bruce finally resigned as joint Guardian and was replaced by Sir Gilbert de Umfraville, Earl of Angus. In May 1301, Umfraville, Comyn, and Lamberton also resigned as joint Guardians and were replaced by Sir John de Soules as sole Guardian. Soules was appointed largely because he was part of neither the Bruce nor the Comyn camps and was a patriot. He was an active Guardian and made renewed efforts to have King John returned to the Scottish throne.

In July 1301 King Edward I launched his sixth campaign into Scotland. Though he captured the castles of Bothwell and Turnberry, he did little to damage the Scots' fighting ability, and in January 1302 he agreed to a nine-month truce. It was around this time that Robert the Bruce submitted to Edward, along with other nobles, even though he had been on the side of the Scots until then. There were rumours that John Balliol would return to regain the Scottish throne. Soules, who had probably been appointed by John, supported his return, as did most other nobles. But it was no more than a rumour and nothing came of it.

In March 1302, Bruce sent a letter to the monks at Melrose Abbey apologising for having called tenants of the monks to service in his army when there had been no national call-up. Bruce pledged that, henceforth, he would "never again" require the monks to serve unless it was to "the common army of the whole realm", for national defence. Bruce also married his second wife that year, Elizabeth de Burgh, the daughter of Richard de Burgh, 2nd Earl of Ulster, in Writtle, near Chelmsford in Essex. Elizabeth was about 13 at the time, and Bruce 28. By Elizabeth he had four children: David II, John (died in childhood), Matilda (who married Thomas Isaac and died at Aberdeen 20 July 1353), and Margaret (who married William de Moravia, 5th Earl of Sutherland in 1345).

In 1303, Edward invaded again, reaching Edinburgh before marching to Perth. Edward stayed in Perth until July, then proceeded via Dundee, Brechin, and Montrose to Aberdeen, where he arrived in August. From there he marched through Moray to Badenoch before re-tracing his path back south to Dunfermline. With the country now under submission, all the leading Scots, except for William Wallace, surrendered to Edward in February 1304. John Comyn, who was by now Guardian again, submitted to Edward. The laws and liberties of Scotland were to be as they had been in the days of Alexander III, and any that needed alteration would be with the assent of King Edward and the advice of the Scottish nobles.

On 11 June 1304, Bruce and William Lamberton made a pact that bound them, each to the other, in "friendship and alliance against all men." If one should break the secret pact, he would forfeit to the other the sum of ten thousand pounds. The pact is often interpreted as a sign of their patriotism despite both having already surrendered to the English. Homage was again obtained from the nobles and the burghs, and a parliament was held to elect those who would meet later in the year with the English parliament to establish rules for the governance of Scotland. The Earl of Richmond, Edward's nephew, was to head up the subordinate government of Scotland. While all this took place, William Wallace was finally captured near Glasgow, and he was hanged, drawn, and quartered in London on 23 August 1305.

In September 1305, Edward ordered Robert Bruce to put his castle at Kildrummy, "in the keeping of such a man as he himself will be willing to answer for," suggesting that King Edward suspected Robert was not entirely trustworthy and may have been plotting behind his back. However, an identical phrase appears in an agreement between Edward and his lieutenant and lifelong friend, Aymer de Valence. A further sign of Edward's distrust occurred on 10 October 1305, when Edward revoked his gift of Sir Gilbert de Umfraville's lands to Bruce that he had made only six months before.

Robert Bruce as Earl of Carrick, and now 7th Lord of Annandale, held huge estates and property in Scotland and a barony and some minor properties in England, and a strong claim to the Scottish throne.

=== Murder of John Comyn ===
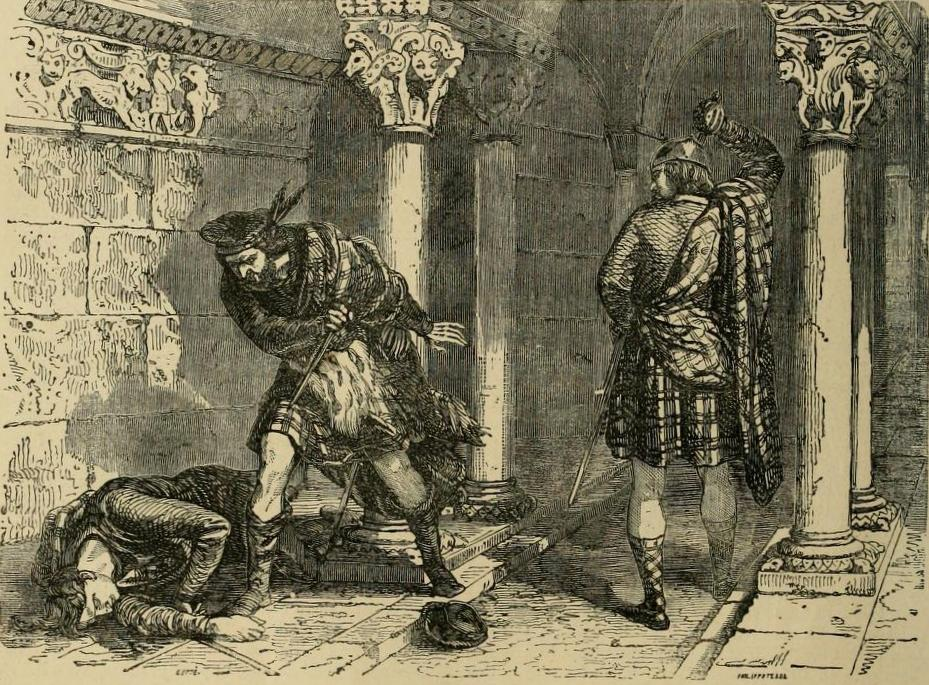
The killing of John Comyn in the Greyfriars church in Dumfries, as imagined by Félix Philippoteaux, a 19th-century illustrator

Bruce, like all his family, had a complete belief in his right to the throne. His ambition was further thwarted by John Comyn, who supported John Balliol. Comyn was the most powerful noble in Scotland and was related to many other powerful nobles both within Scotland and England, including relatives that held the earldoms of Buchan, Mar, Ross, Fife, Angus, Dunbar, and Strathearn; the Lordships of Kilbride, Kirkintilloch, Lenzie, Bedrule, and Scraesburgh; and sheriffdoms in Banff, Dingwall, Wigtown, and Aberdeen. He also had a powerful claim to the Scottish throne through his descent from Donald III on his father's side and David I on his mother's side. Comyn was the nephew of John Balliol.

According to Barbour and Fordoun, in the late summer of 1305, in a secret agreement sworn, signed, and sealed, John Comyn agreed to forfeit his claim to the Scottish throne in favour of Robert Bruce upon receipt of the Bruce lands in Scotland should an uprising occur led by Bruce. Whether the details of the agreement with Comyn are correct or not, King Edward moved to arrest Bruce while Bruce was still at the English court. Ralph de Monthermer learned of Edward's intention and warned Bruce by sending him twelve pence and a pair of spurs. Bruce took the hint, and he and a squire fled the English court during the night. They made their way quickly to Scotland.

According to Barbour, Comyn betrayed his agreement with Bruce to King Edward I, and when Bruce arranged a meeting for 10 February 1306 with Comyn in the Chapel of Greyfriars Monastery in Dumfries and accused him of treachery, they came to blows. Bruce stabbed Comyn before the high altar. The Scotichronicon says that on being told that Comyn had survived the attack and was being treated, two of Bruce's supporters, Roger de Kirkpatrick (uttering the words "I mak siccar" ("I make sure")) and John Lindsay, went back into the church and finished Bruce's work. Barbour, however, tells no such story. The Flores Historiarum, which was written c. 1307, says Bruce and Comyn disagreed and Bruce drew his sword and struck Comyn over the head. Bruce supporters then ran up and stabbed Comyn with their swords. Bruce asserted his claim to the Scottish crown and began his campaign by force for the independence of Scotland.

Bruce and his party then attacked Dumfries Castle, where the English garrison surrendered. Bruce hurried from Dumfries to Glasgow, where his friend and supporter Bishop Robert Wishart granted him absolution and subsequently adjured the clergy throughout the land to rally to Bruce. Nonetheless, Bruce was excommunicated for this crime.

== King of Scotland (1306–1329) ==
=== Early reign (1306–1314) ===
==== Inauguration ====
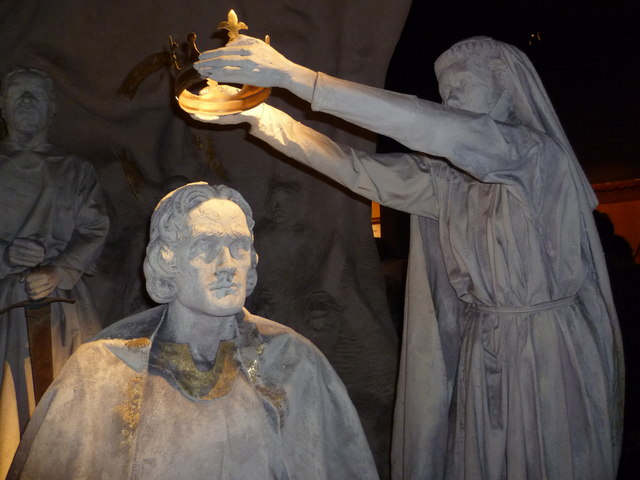
Bruce crowned King of Scots by Isabella MacDuff, Countess of Buchan; modern tableau at Edinburgh Castle

Six weeks after Comyn was killed in Dumfries, Bruce was inaugurated King of Scots by Bishop William de Lamberton at Scone, near Perth, on Palm Sunday 25 March 1306 with all formality and solemnity. The royal robes and vestments that Robert Wishart had hidden from the English were brought out by the bishop and set upon King Robert. The bishops of Moray and Glasgow were in attendance, as were the earls of Atholl, Menteith, the Lennox and Mar. The great banner of the kings of Scotland was planted behind Bruce's throne. The following day, he agreed to be crowned for a second time by Isabella MacDuff, Countess of Buchan, as according to tradition, the crowning ceremony was performed by a representative of Clan MacDuff.

==== War of Robert the Bruce ====
Edward I marched north again in the spring of 1306. On his way, he granted the Scottish estates of Bruce and his adherents to his own followers and had published a bill excommunicating Bruce. In June, Bruce was defeated at the Battle of Methven. His wife and daughters and other women of the party were sent to Kildrummy in August under the protection of Bruce's brother, Neil Bruce, and the Earl of Atholl and most of his remaining men. Bruce fled with a small following of his most faithful men, including Sir James Douglas and Gilbert Hay, Bruce's brothers Thomas, Alexander, and Edward, as well as Sir Neil Campbell and the Earl of Lennox.

A strong force under Edward, Prince of Wales, captured Kildrummy Castle on 13 September 1306, taking prisoner the King's youngest brother, Nigel de Bruce, as well as Robert Boyd and Alexander Lindsay, and Sir Simon Fraser. Boyd managed to escape but both Nigel de Bruce and Lindsay were executed shortly after at Berwick following King Edward's orders to execute all followers of Robert de Bruce. Fraser was taken to London to suffer the same fate. Shortly before the fall of Kildrummy Castle, the Earl of Atholl made a desperate attempt to take Queen Elizabeth de Burgh, Margery de Bruce, as well as King Robert's sisters and Isabella of Fife. They were betrayed a few days later and also fell into English hands, Atholl to be executed in London, and the women to be held under the harshest possible circumstances.

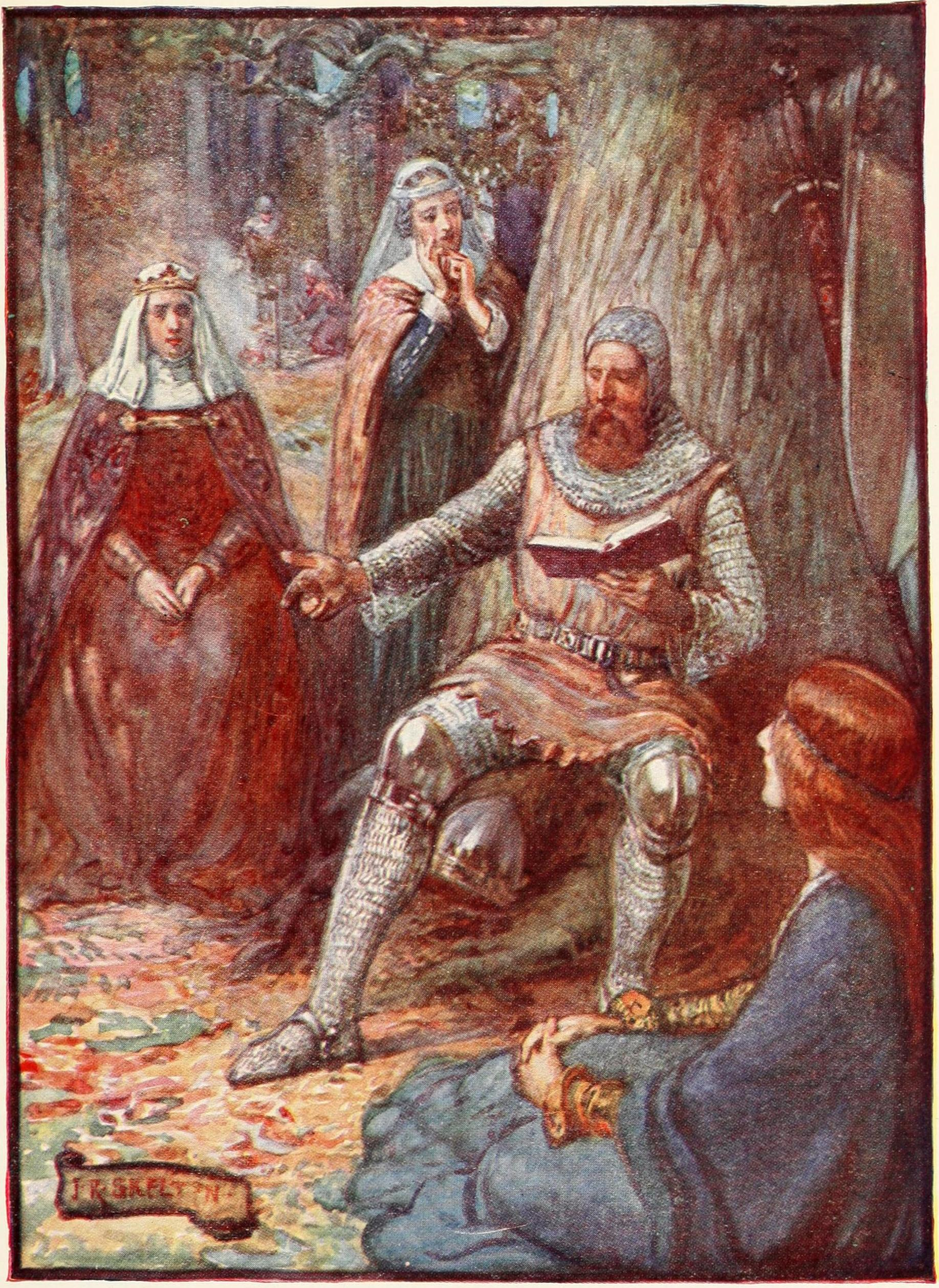
Bruce reading stories to his followers; from a 19th-century Scottish history book

It is still uncertain where Bruce spent the winter of 1306–1307. Most likely he spent it in the Hebrides, possibly sheltered by Christina of the Isles. The latter was married to a member of the Mar kindred, a family to which Bruce was related (not only was his first wife a member of this family but her brother, Gartnait, was married to a sister of Bruce). Ireland is also a serious possibility, and Orkney (under Norwegian rule at the time) or Norway proper (where his sister Isabel Bruce was queen dowager) are unlikely but not impossible. Bruce and his followers returned to the Scottish mainland in February 1307 in two groups. One, led by Bruce and his brother Edward, landed at Turnberry Castle and began a guerrilla war in southwest Scotland. The other, led by his brothers Thomas and Alexander, landed slightly further south in Loch Ryan, but they were soon captured and executed. In April, Bruce won a small victory over the English at the Battle of Glen Trool, before defeating Aymer de Valence, 2nd Earl of Pembroke, at the Battle of Loudoun Hill. At the same time, James Douglas made his first foray for Bruce into southwestern Scotland, attacking and burning his own castle in Douglasdale. Leaving his brother Edward in command in Galloway, Bruce travelled north, capturing Inverlochy and Urquhart Castles, burning to the ground Inverness Castle and Nairn, then unsuccessfully threatening Elgin. On 7 July 1307, King Edward I died, leaving Bruce opposed by the king's son, Edward II.

Transferring operations to Aberdeenshire in late 1307, Bruce threatened Banff before falling seriously ill, probably owing to the hardships of the lengthy campaign. Recovering, leaving John Comyn, 3rd Earl of Buchan unsubdued at his rear, Bruce returned west to take Balvenie and Duffus Castles, then Tarradale Castle on the Black Isle. Looping back via the hinterlands of Inverness and a second failed attempt to take Elgin, Bruce finally achieved his landmark defeat of Comyn at the Battle of Inverurie in May 1308; he then overran Buchan and defeated the English garrison at Aberdeen. The Harrying of Buchan in 1308 was ordered by Bruce to make sure all Comyn family support was extinguished. Buchan had a very large population because it was the agricultural capital of northern Scotland, and much of its population was loyal to the Comyn family even after the defeat of the Earl of Buchan. Most of the Comyn castles in Moray, Aberdeen and Buchan were destroyed (slighted) and their inhabitants killed. In less than a year Bruce had swept through the north and destroyed the power of the Comyns who had held vice-regal power in the north for nearly one hundred years. How this dramatic success was achieved, especially the taking of northern castles so quickly, is difficult to understand. Bruce lacked siege weapons and it's unlikely his army had substantially greater numbers or was better armed than his opponents. The morale and leadership of the Comyns and their northern allies appeared to be inexplicably lacking in the face of their direct challenge. He then crossed to Argyll and defeated the isolated MacDougalls (allies of the Comyns) at the Battle of Pass of Brander and took Dunstaffnage Castle, the last major stronghold of the Comyns and their allies. Bruce then ordered harryings in Argyle and Kintyre, in the territories of Clan MacDougall.

In March 1309, Bruce held his first parliament at St. Andrews and by August he controlled all of Scotland north of the River Tay. The following year, the clergy of Scotland recognised Bruce as king at a general council. The support given him by the church, in spite of his excommunication, was of great political importance. On 1 October 1310, Bruce wrote Edward II of England from Kildrum in Cumbernauld Parish in an unsuccessful attempt to establish peace between Scotland and England. Over the next three years, one English-held castle or outpost after another was captured and reduced: Linlithgow in 1310, Dumbarton in 1311, and Perth, by Bruce himself, in January 1312. Bruce also made raids into northern England and, landing at Ramsey in the Isle of Man, laid siege to Castle Rushen in Castletown, capturing it on 21 June 1313 and denying the English the island's strategic importance.

==== Battle of Bannockburn ====
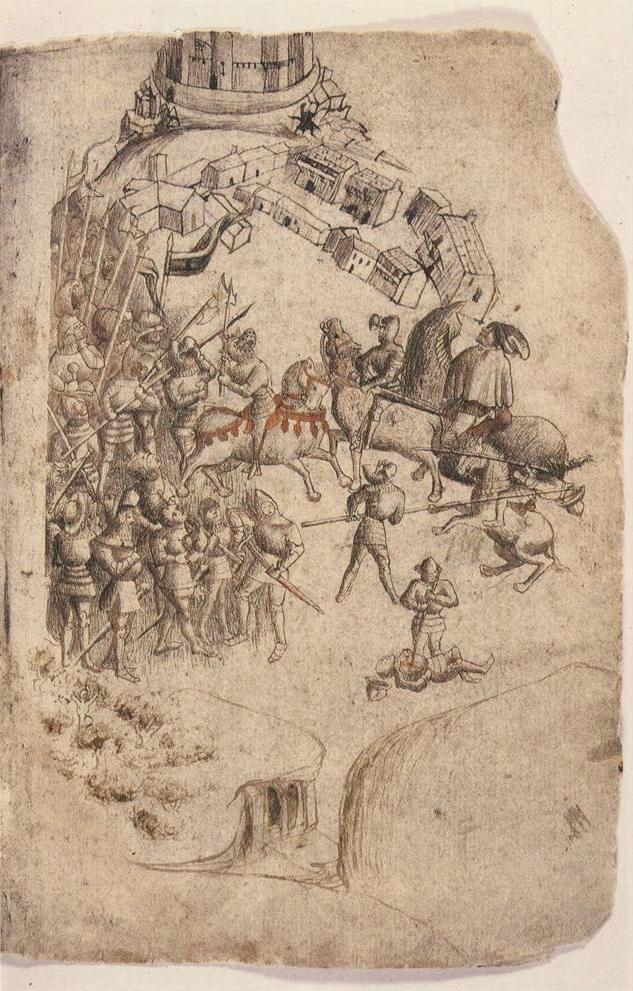
The earliest known depiction of the Battle of Bannockburn in 1314 from a 1440s manuscript of Walter Bower's Scotichronicon

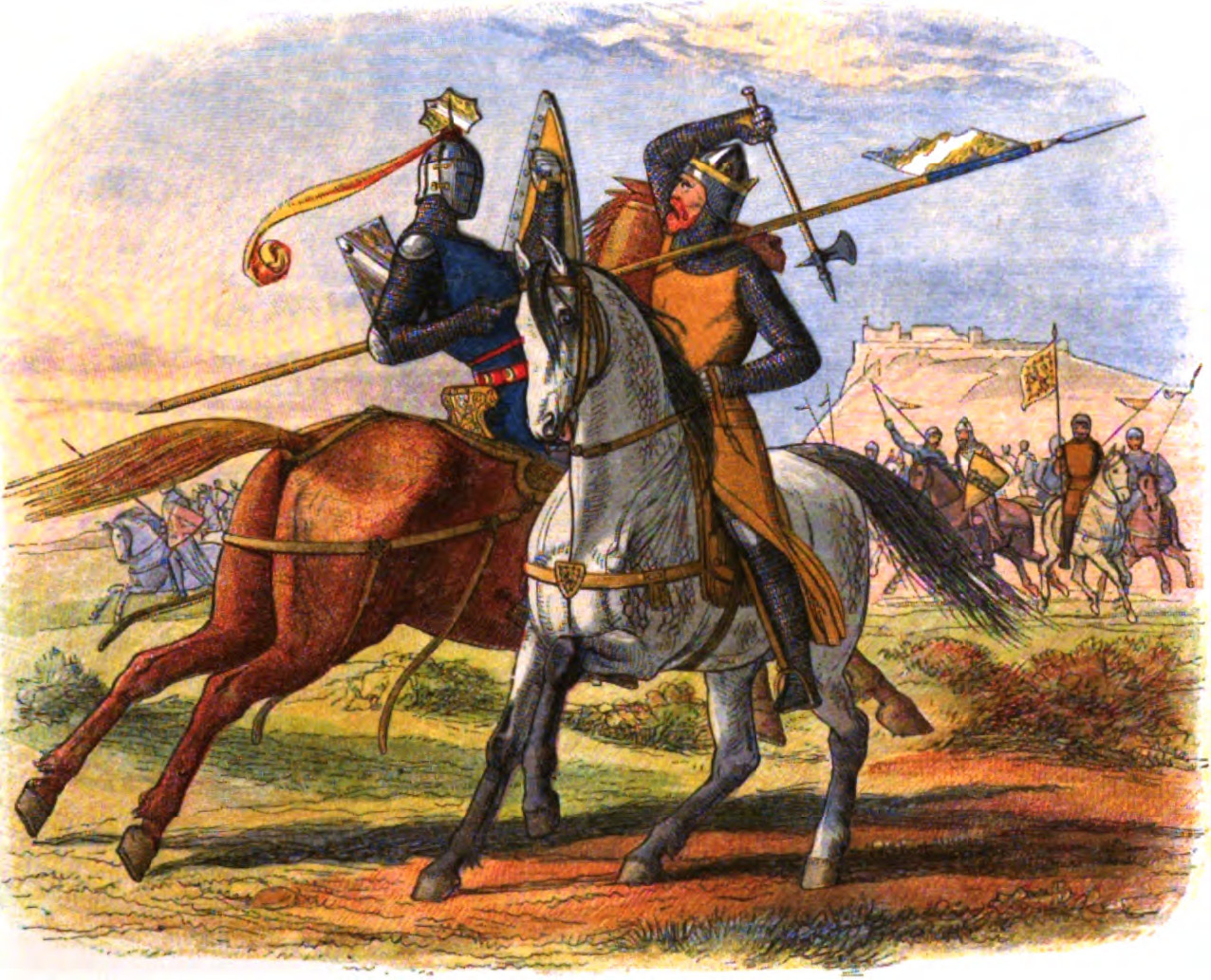
19th-century depiction of Robert the Bruce killing Sir Henry de Bohun during the Battle of Bannockburn

By 1314, Bruce had recaptured most of the castles in Scotland held by the English and was sending raiding parties into northern England as far as Carlisle. In response, Edward II planned a major military campaign with the support of Lancaster and the barons, mustering a large army of between 15,000 and 20,000 men. In the spring of 1314, Edward Bruce laid siege to Stirling Castle, a key fortification in Scotland whose governor, Philip de Mowbray, agreed to surrender if not relieved before 24 June 1314. In March, James Douglas captured Roxburgh, and Randolph captured Edinburgh Castle (Bruce later ordered the execution of Piers de Lombard, governor of the castle), while in May, Bruce again raided England and subdued the Isle of Man. News of the agreement regarding Stirling Castle reached the English king in late May, and he decided to speed his march north from Berwick to relieve the castle. Robert, with between 5,500 and 6,500 troops, predominantly spearmen, prepared to prevent Edward's forces from reaching Stirling.

The battle began on 23 June as the English army attempted to force its way across the high ground of the Bannock Burn, which was surrounded by marshland. Skirmishing between the two sides broke out, resulting in the death of Sir Henry de Bohun, whom Robert killed in personal combat. Edward continued his advance the following day and encountered the bulk of the Scottish army as they emerged from the woods of New Park. The English appear not to have expected the Scots to give battle here, and as a result had kept their forces in marching, rather than battle, order, with the archers − who would usually have been used to break up enemy spear formations − at the back, rather than the front, of the army. The English cavalry found it hard to operate in the cramped terrain and were crushed by Robert's spearmen. The English army was overwhelmed and its leaders were unable to regain control.

Edward II was dragged from the battlefield, hotly pursued by the Scottish forces, and only just escaped the heavy fighting. The historian Roy Haines describes the defeat as a "calamity of stunning proportions" for the English, whose losses were huge. In the aftermath of the defeat, Edward retreated to Dunbar, then travelled by ship to Berwick, and then back to York; in his absence, Stirling Castle quickly fell.

=== Mid-reign (1314–1320) ===
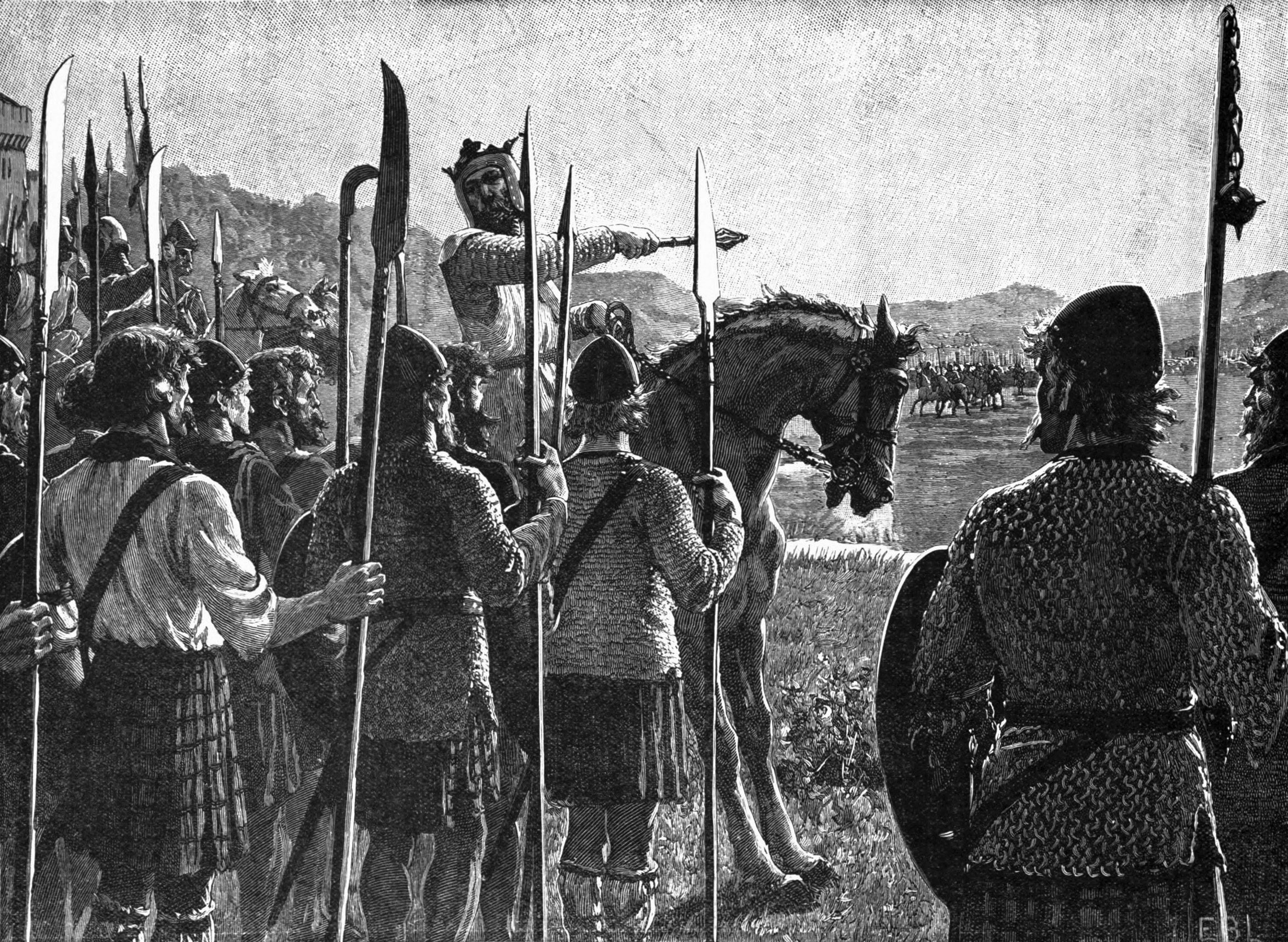
Bruce addresses his troops, from Cassell's History of England.

==== English and Irish conflict ====
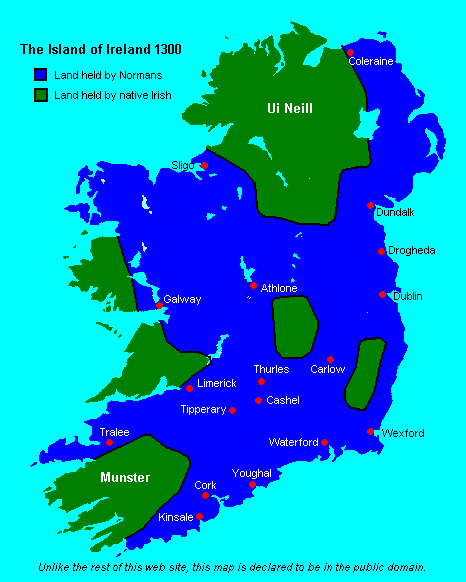
Ireland c.1300 showing the extent of Hiberno-Norman control

Freed from English threats, Scotland's armies could now invade northern England. Bruce also drove back a subsequent English expedition north of the border and launched raids into Yorkshire and Lancashire. Buoyed by his military successes, Robert also sent his brother Edward to invade Ireland in 1315, in an attempt to secure a second crown (having received a reply to offers of assistance from Domhnall Ó Néill, king of Tír Eoghain), and to open a second front in the continuing wars with England. Edward was even crowned as High King of Ireland in 1316. Robert later went there with another army to assist his brother.

In conjunction with the invasion, Bruce popularised an ideological vision of a "Pan-Gaelic Greater Scotia" with his lineage ruling over both Ireland and Scotland. This propaganda campaign was aided by two factors. The first was the betrayal of Robert's marriage alliance, of 1302, with the Richard Óg de Burgh, 2nd Earl of Ulster, Robert's second wife being the 13-year-old daughter of Richard, Elizabeth de Burgh, though despite the marriage Richard sided with Edward following Comyn's 1305 murder; second, Bruce himself, on his mother's side of Carrick, was descended from Gaelic royalty in Scotland as well as Ireland. Bruce's Irish ancestors included Aoife of Leinster (d. 1188), whose ancestors included Brian Boru of Munster and the kings of Leinster. Thus, lineally and geopolitically, Bruce attempted to support his anticipated notion of a pan-Gaelic alliance between Scottish-Irish Gaelic populations, under his kingship. This is revealed by a letter he sent to the Irish chiefs, where he calls the Scots and Irish collectively nostra nacio (our nation), stressing the common language, customs and heritage of the two peoples:

Whereas we and you and our people and your people, free since ancient times, share the same national ancestry and are urged to come together more eagerly and joyfully in friendship by a common language and by common custom, we have sent you our beloved kinsman, the bearers of this letter, to negotiate with you in our name about permanently strengthening and maintaining inviolate the special friendship between us and you, so that with God's will our nation (nostra nacio) may be able to recover her ancient liberty.

The diplomacy worked to a certain extent, at least in Ulster, where the Scots had some support. The Irish chief, Domhnall Ó Néill, for instance, later justified his support for the Scots to Pope John XXII by saying "the Kings of Lesser Scotia all trace their blood to our Greater Scotia and retain to some degree our language and customs."

Initially, the Scot-Irish army seemed unstoppable as they defeated the Hiberno-Norman forces of Richard De Burgh, Robert's father-in-law and Earl of Ulster, Edward's army levelling his Hiberno-Norman towns. However, the Scots failed to win over the non-Ulster chiefs or to make any other significant gains in the south of the island, where people couldn't see the difference between Hiberno-Norman and Scottish occupation. This was because a famine struck Ireland and the army struggled to sustain itself. They resorted to pillaging and razing entire settlements as they searched for supplies, regardless of whether they were Hiberno-Norman or Irish. Eventually, it was defeated when Edward Bruce was killed at the Battle of Faughart, by an army led by Richard de Burgh. The Irish Annals of the period described the defeat of the Bruces by the Hiberno-Normans as one of the greatest things ever done for the Irish nation due to the fact it brought an end to the famine and pillaging wrought upon the Irish by both the Scots and the Hiberno-Normans. For his 1306 campaign against the English Crown, Robert's excommunication by Pope Clement V was reaffirmed in 1318 by Pope John XXII.

=== Later reign (1320–1329) ===
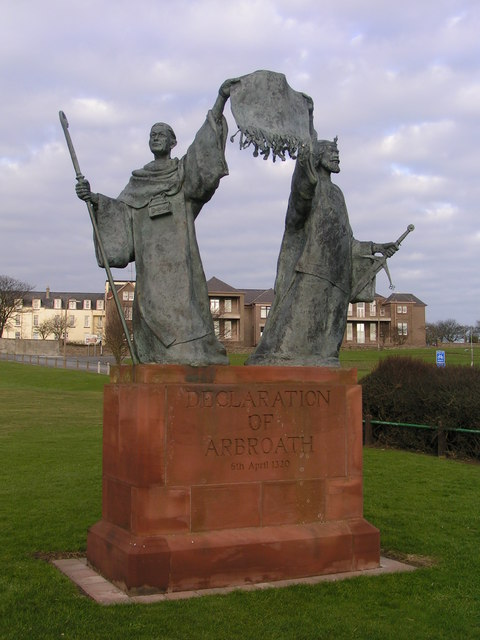
Statue of Bernard of Kilwinning and Robert the Bruce raising the Declaration of Arbroath

The reign of Robert Bruce also included some significant diplomatic achievements. The Declaration of Arbroath of 1320 strengthened his position, particularly in relation to the Papacy, and Pope John XXII eventually lifted Bruce's excommunication. In May 1328, King Edward III of England signed the Treaty of Edinburgh–Northampton, which recognised Scotland as an independent kingdom, and Bruce as its king.

In 1325, Robert I acquired lands at Cardross in exchange for those of Old Montros in Angus, Scotland, with Sir David Graham. It was to be here in Cardoss that Robert would build the manor house that would serve as his favoured residence during the final years of his reign. The extant chamberlain's accounts for 1328 detail a manor house at Cardross with king's and queen's chambers and glazed windows, a chapel, kitchens, bake- and brew-houses, falcon aviary, medicinal garden, gatehouse, protective moat and a hunting park. There was also a jetty and beaching area for the 'king's coble' (for fishing) alongside the "king's great ship". (Note: The exact location of Cardross manor house is uncertain. Excavations of 2008–2009 identified the likely site of the manor house at "Pillanflatt", Renton, West Dunbartonshire, beside the River Leven, opposite Dumbarton and some 4 miles (6 kilometres) east of the modern village of Cardross; however, historic cultivated land, quarry and canal works at Mains of Cardross may also point to a possible location for Robert's manor.) As most of mainland Scotland's major royal castles had remained in their razed state since around 1313–1314, Cardross manor was perhaps built as a modest residence sympathetic to Robert's subjects' privations through a long war, repeated famines and livestock pandemics. Before Cardross became habitable in 1327, Robert's main residence had been Scone Abbey.

Robert had been suffering from a serious illness since at least 1327. The Lanercost Chronicle and Scalacronica state that the king was said to have contracted and died of leprosy. Jean Le Bel also stated that in 1327 the king was a victim of 'la grosse maladie', which is usually taken to mean leprosy. However, the ignorant use of the term 'leprosy' by fourteenth-century writers meant that almost any major skin disease might be called leprosy. The earliest mention of this illness is to be found in an original letter written by an eyewitness in Ulster at the time the king made a truce with Sir Henry Mandeville on 12 July 1327. The writer of this letter reported that Robert was so feeble and struck down by illness that he would not live, 'for he can scarcely move anything but his tongue'. However, none of the several accounts of his last years by people who were with him refer to any sign of a skin ailment. Barbour writes of the king's illness that "it began through a benumbing brought on by his cold lying", during the months of wandering from 1306 to 1309. It has been proposed alternatively that he had eczema, tuberculosis, syphilis, motor neuron disease, cancer, or a series of strokes. There does not seem to be any evidence as to what the king himself or his physicians believed his illness to be. Nor is there any evidence of an attempt in his last years to segregate the king in any way from the company of friends, family, courtiers, or foreign diplomats.

In October 1328, the Pope finally lifted the interdict from Scotland and the excommunication of Robert. The king's last journey appears to have been a pilgrimage to the shrine of Saint Ninian at Whithorn; this was possibly in search of a miraculous cure, or to make his peace with God. With Moray by his side, Robert set off from his manor at Cardross for Tarbert on his 'great ship', thence to the Isle of Arran, where he celebrated Christmas of 1328 at the hall of Glenkill near Lamlash. Thence he sailed to the mainland to visit his son and his bride, both mere children, now installed at Turnberry Castle, the head of the earldom of Carrick and once his own main residence. He journeyed overland, being carried on a litter, to Inch in Wigtownshire: houses were built there, and supplies brought to that place, as though the king's condition had deteriorated. At the end of March 1329, he was staying at Glenluce Abbey and at Monreith, from where St Ninian's Cave was visited. Early in April, he arrived at the shrine of St Ninian at Whithorn. He fasted four or five days and prayed to the saint, before returning by sea to Cardross.

Barbour and other sources relate that Robert summoned his prelates and barons to his bedside for a final council at which he made copious gifts to religious houses, dispensed silver to religious foundations of various orders, so that they might pray for his soul, and repented of his failure to fulfil a vow to undertake a crusade to fight the 'Saracens' in the Holy Land. Robert's final wish reflected conventional piety, and was perhaps intended to perpetuate his memory. After his death his heart was to be removed from his body and, accompanied by a company of knights led by Sir James Douglas, taken on pilgrimage to the Church of the Holy Sepulchre in Jerusalem before being interred in Melrose Abbey upon its return from the Holy Land:

I will that as soone as I am trespassed out of this worlde that ye take my harte owte of my body, and embawme it, and take of my treasoure as ye shall thynke sufficient for that enterprise, both for your selfe and suche company as ye wyll take with you, and present my hart to the holy Sepulchre where as our Lorde laye, seyng my body can nat come there.

Robert also arranged for perpetual soul masses to be funded at the chapel of Saint Serf, at Ayr and at the Dominican friary in Berwick, as well as at Dunfermline Abbey.

== Death (1329) ==
=== Death and aftermath ===
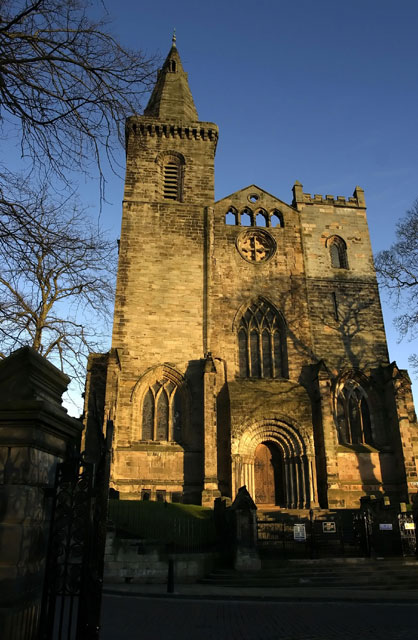
King Robert I is buried in Dunfermline Abbey.

Robert died on 7 June 1329, at the Manor of Cardross, near Dumbarton. Apart from failing to fulfill a vow to undertake a crusade he died utterly fulfilled, in that the goal of his lifetime's struggle – untrammelled recognition of the Bruce right to the crown – had been realised, and confident that he was leaving the kingdom of Scotland safely in the hands of his most trusted lieutenant, Moray until his infant son reached adulthood. Six days after his death, to complete his triumph still further, papal bulls were issued granting the privilege of unction at the coronation of future Kings of Scots.

It remains unclear just what caused the death of Robert, a month before his fifty-fifth birthday. Contemporary accusations that Robert had leprosy, the "unclean sickness" – the present-day, treatable Hansen's disease – derived from English and Hainault chroniclers. None of the Scottish accounts of his death hint at leprosy. Penman states that it is very difficult to accept the notion of Robert as a functioning king serving in war, performing face-to-face acts of lordship, holding parliament and court, travelling widely and fathering several children, all while displaying the infectious symptoms of a leper. Along with suggestions of eczema, tuberculosis, syphilis, motor neurone disease, cancer or stroke, a diet of rich court food has also been suggested as a possible contributory factor in Robert's death. His Milanese physician, Maino De Maineri, did criticise the king's eating of eels as dangerous to his health in advancing years.

A team of researchers, headed by Professor Andrew Nelson from University of Western Ontario have determined that Robert the Bruce did not have leprosy. The team were given access to an original casting of Robert the Bruce's skull by descendant Lord Andrew Douglas Alexander Thomas Bruce, and images of a foot bone. They determined that the skull and foot bone showed no signs of leprosy, such as an eroded nasal spine and a pencilling of the foot bone.

=== Burial ===
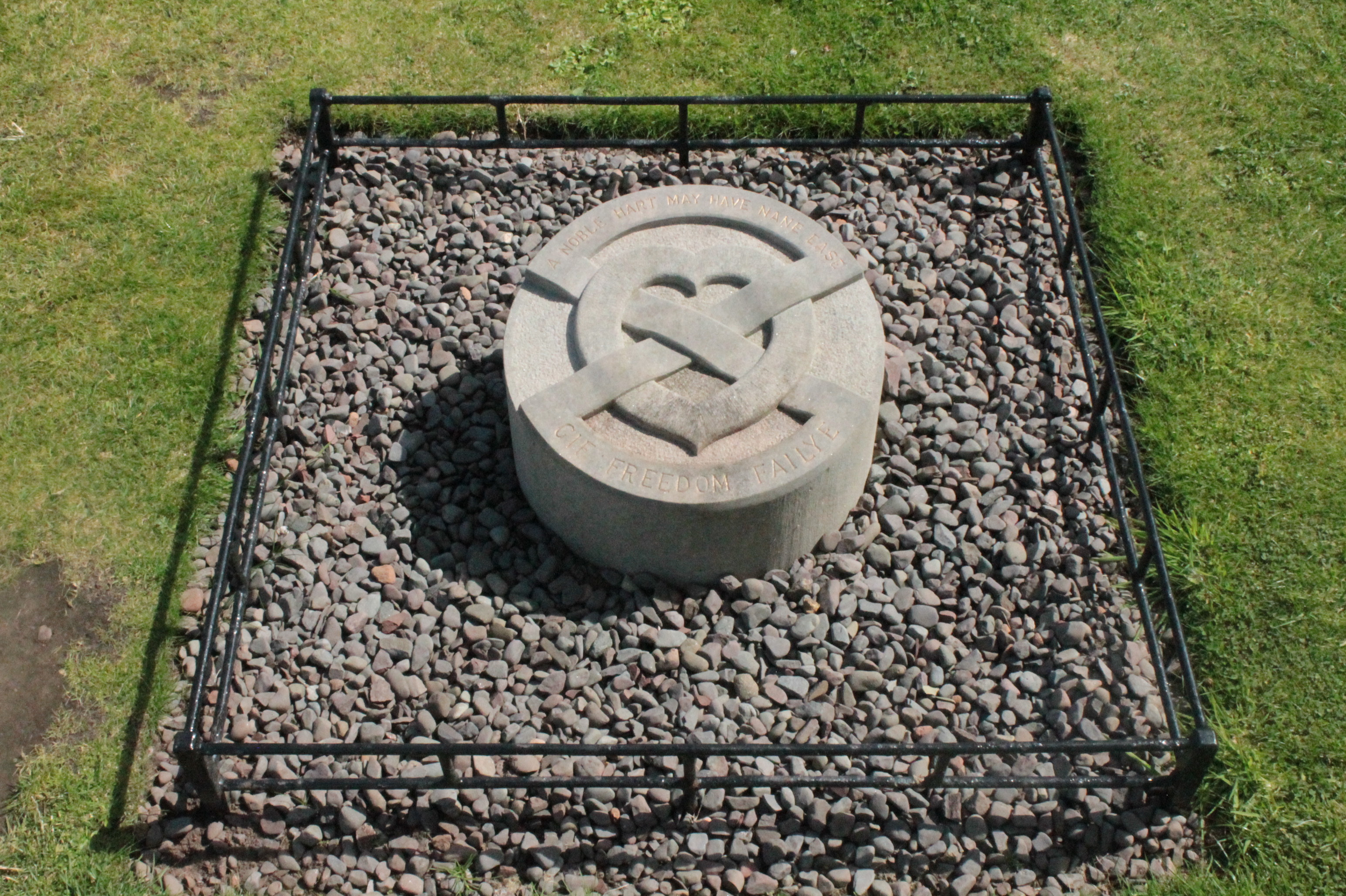
Marker stone for the burial place of Robert the Bruce's heart, Melrose Abbey

The king's body was embalmed, and his sternum sawn open to allow extraction of the heart, which Sir James Douglas placed in a silver casket to be worn on a chain around his neck. Robert's viscera were interred in the chapel of Saint Serf (the ruins of which are located in the present-day Levengrove Park in Dumbarton), his regular place of worship and close to his manor house in the ancient Parish of Cardross. The king's body was carried east from Cardross by a carriage decked in black lawn cloth, with stops recorded at Dunipace and Cambuskenneth Abbey. The funeral was a grand affair, with 478 stone (3,040 kg) of wax having been purchased for the making of funerary candles. A file of mourners on foot, including Robert Stewart and a number of knights dressed in black gowns, accompanied the funeral party into Dunfermline Abbey. A canopy chapel or "hearse" of imported Baltic wood was erected over the grave. Robert I's body, in a wooden coffin, was then interred within a stone vault beneath the floor, underneath a box tomb of white Italian marble purchased in Paris by Thomas of Chartres after June 1328. A plinth of black Frosterley Marble topped this structure, and atop this plinth was a white shawl alabaster effigy of Robert I, painted and gilded. The following Latin epitaph was inscribed around the top of the tomb: Hic jacet invictus Robertus Rex benedictus qui sua gesta legit repetit quot bella peregit ad libertatem perduxit per probitatem regnum scottorum: nunc vivat in arce polorum ("Here lies the invincible blessed King Robert / Whoever reads about his feats will repeat the many battles he fought / By his integrity he guided to liberty the Kingdom of the Scots: May he now live in Heaven"). Ten alabaster fragments from the tomb are on display in the National Museum of Scotland and traces of gilding still remain on some of them. Robert had bequeathed sufficient funds to pay for thousands of obituary masses in Dunfermline Abbey and elsewhere, and his tomb would thus be the site of daily votive prayers.

Bruce's dying wish was that his heart should be taken to the Holy Land. When a projected international crusade failed to materialise, Sir James Douglas and his company, escorting the casket containing Bruce's heart, sailed to Spain where Alfonso XI of Castile was mounting a campaign against the Moorish kingdom of Granada. According to John Barbour, Douglas and his companions, including Sir William de Keith, Sir William St. Clair of Rosslyn and the brothers Sir Robert Logan of Restalrig and Sir Walter Logan, were welcomed cordially by King Alfonso. In August 1330 the Scots contingent formed part of the Castilian army besieging the frontier castle of Teba. Under circumstances which are still disputed, Sir James and most of his companions were killed. The sources all agree that, outnumbered and separated from the main Christian army, a group of Scots knights led by Douglas was overwhelmed and wiped out. John Barbour describes how the surviving members of the company recovered Douglas' body together with the casket containing Bruce's heart. The heart, together with Douglas' bones, was then brought back to Scotland, where it was buried at Melrose Abbey in Roxburghshire.

In 1920, what appeared to be King Robert's heart was discovered by archaeologists and was reburied, but the location was not marked. In 1996, a casket was unearthed during construction work. Scientific study by AOC archaeologists in Edinburgh demonstrated that it did indeed contain human tissue and it was of appropriate age. It was reburied in Melrose Abbey in 1998, according to the dying wishes of the King.

=== Discovery of the Bruce's tomb ===
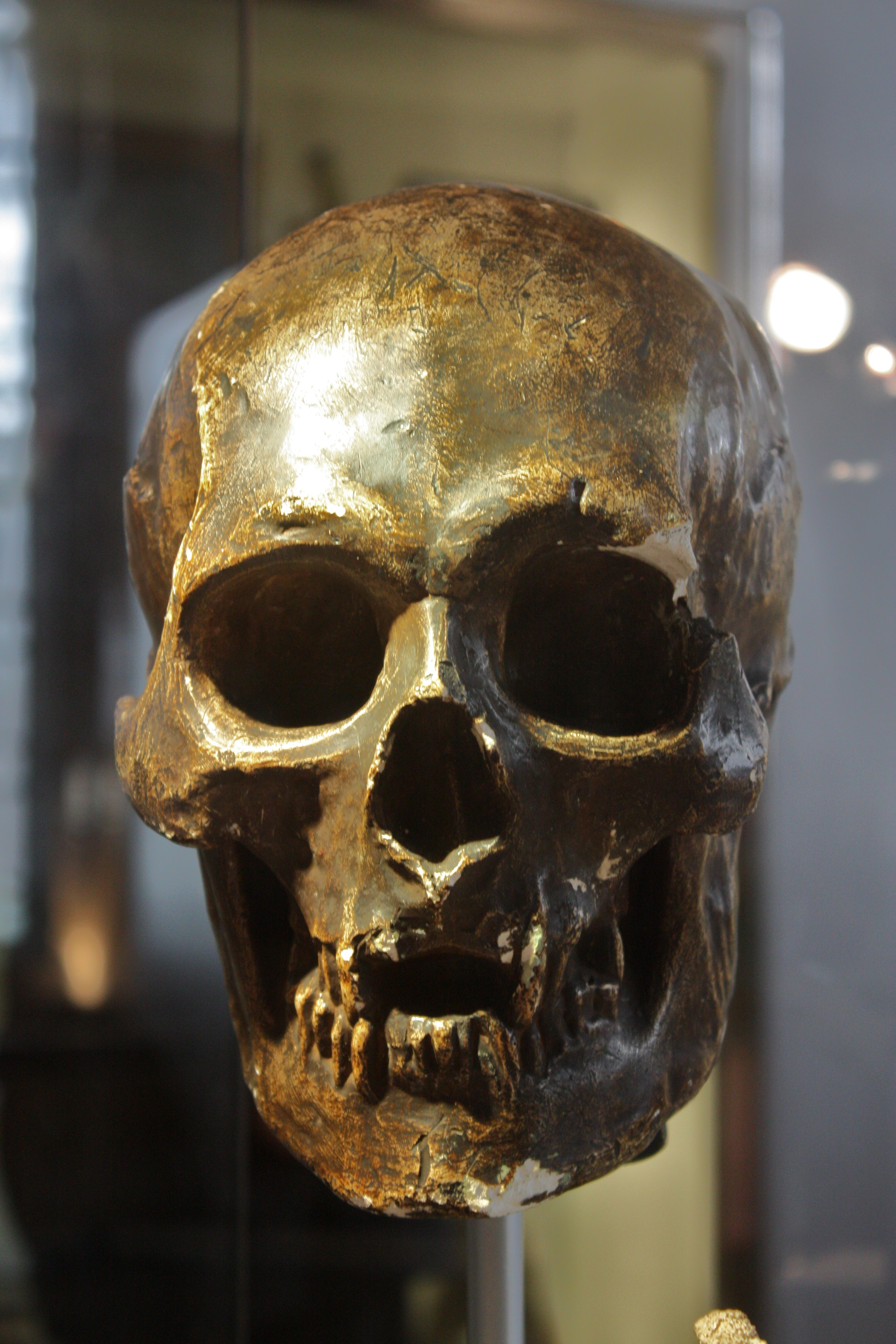
Plaster cast of Robert I's skull by William Scoular

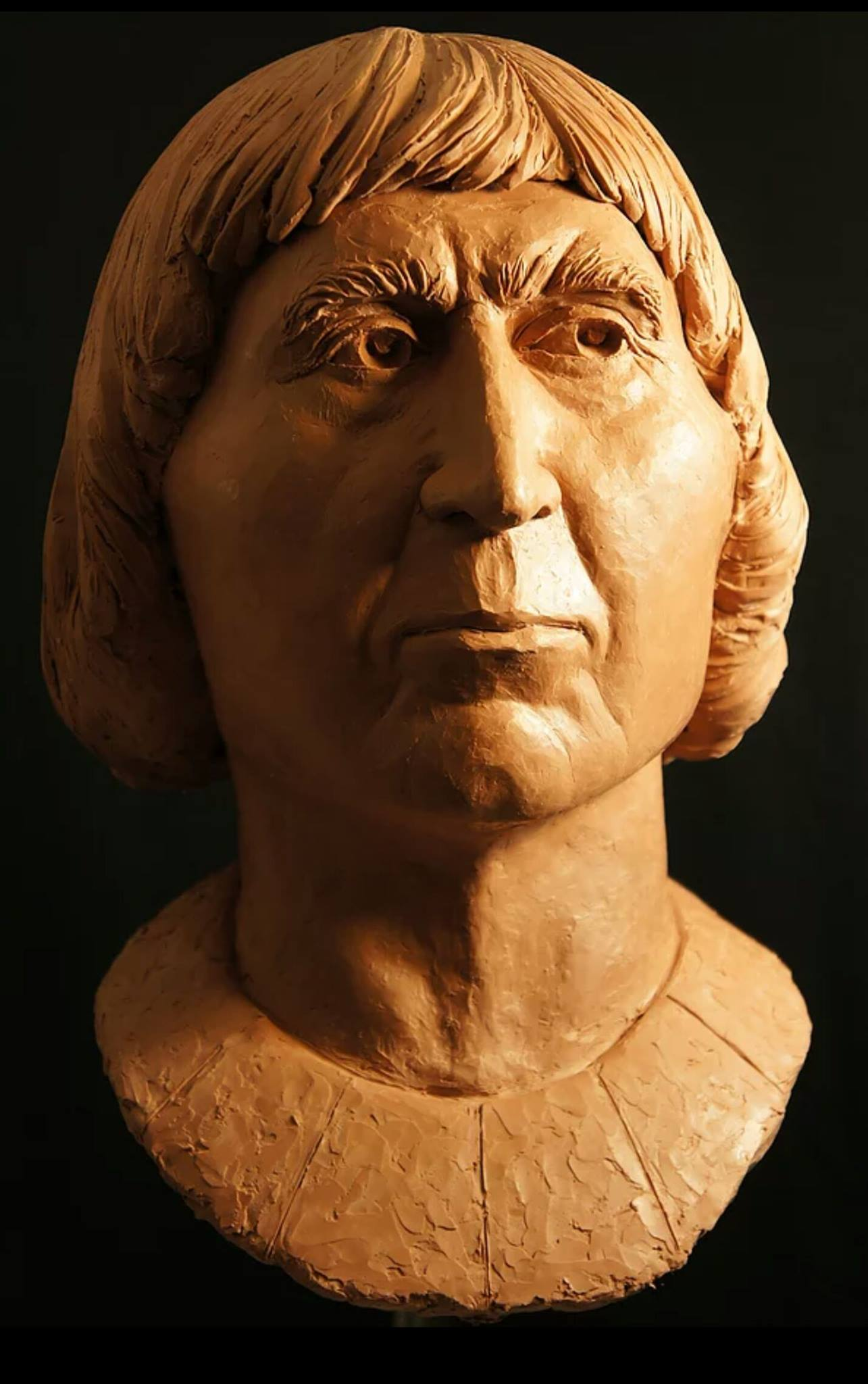
The face of Robert the Bruce by forensic sculptor Christian Corbet

During the Scottish Reformation, the abbey church had undergone a first Protestant "cleansing" by September 1559 and was sacked in March 1560. By September 1563 the choir and feretory chapel were roofless, and it was said that the nave was also in a sorry state, with the walls so extensively damaged that it was a danger to enter. In 1672 parts of the east end collapsed, while in 1716 part of the central tower is said to have fallen, presumably destabilising much that still stood around its base, and the east gable tumbled in 1726. The final collapse of the central tower took place in 1753.

On 17 February 1818, workmen breaking ground on the new parish church to be built on the site of the choir of Dunfermline Abbey uncovered a vault before the site of the former abbey high altar. The vault was covered by two large, flat stones – one forming a headstone, and a larger stone 7 feet (210 cm) in length, with six iron rings or handles set in it. When these stones were removed, the vault was found to be 7 feet (210 cm) in length, 22 inches (56 cm) wide and 18 inches (46 cm) deep. Within the vault, inside the remnants of a decayed oak coffin, there was a body entirely enclosed in lead, with a decayed shroud of cloth of gold over it. Over the head of the body, the lead was formed into the shape of a crown. Fragments of marble and alabaster had been found in the debris around the site of the vault several years earlier, which were linked to Robert the Bruce's recorded purchase of a marble and alabaster tomb made in Paris.

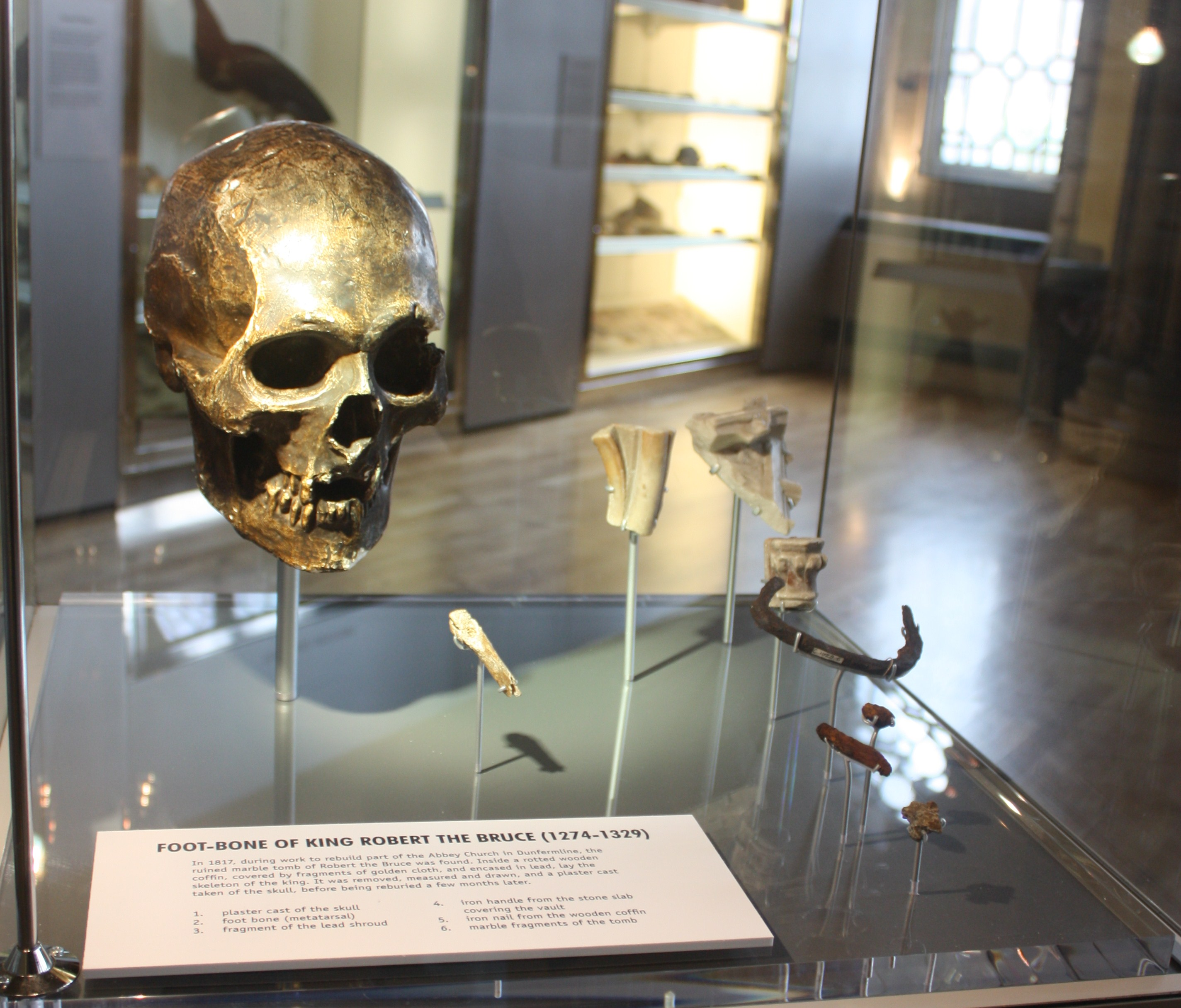
Display case of artifacts pertaining to Robert the Bruce: 1) plaster cast of his skull; 2) foot bone (metatarsal); 3) fragment of the lead shroud; 4) iron handle from the stone slab covering the vault; 5) iron nail from the wooden coffin; 6) marble fragments of the tomb. Hunterian Museum and Art Gallery, Glasgow, Scotland.

The Barons of Exchequer ordered that the vault was to be secured from all further inspection with new stones and iron bars and guarded by the town constables and that once the walls of the new church were built up around the site, an investigation of the vault and the remains could take place. Accordingly, on 5 November 1819, the investigation took place. The cloth of gold shroud and the lead covering were found to be in a rapid state of decay since the vault had first been opened 21 months earlier. The body was raised up and placed on a wooden coffin board on the edge of the vault. It was found to be covered in two thin layers of lead, each around 5 millimetres (0.20 in) thick. The lead was removed and the skeleton was inspected by James Gregory and Alexander Monro, Professor of Anatomy at the University of Edinburgh. The sternum was found to have been sawn open from top to bottom, permitting removal of the king's heart after death. A plaster cast was taken of the detached skull by artist William Scoular. The bones were measured and drawn, and the king's skeleton was measured to be 5 feet 11 inches (180 cm). It has been estimated that Bruce stood at around 6 feet 1 inch (185 cm) tall as a young man, which by medieval standards was impressive. At this height he would have stood almost as tall as Edward I (6 feet 2 inches; 188 cm).

The skeleton, lying on the wooden coffin board, was then placed upon the top of a lead coffin and the large crowd of curious people who had assembled outside the church were allowed to file past the vault to view the king's remains. It was at this point in the proceedings that some small relics – teeth and finger bones – were allegedly removed from the skeleton. The published accounts of eyewitnesses such as Henry Jardine and James Gregory confirm the removal of small objects at this time. Robert the Bruce's remains were ceremonially re-interred in the vault in Dunfermline Abbey on 5 November 1819. They were placed in a new lead coffin, into which was poured 1,500 lbs of molten pitch to preserve the remains before the coffin was sealed.

Reconstructions of the face of Robert the Bruce have been produced, including those by Richard Neave from the University of Manchester, Peter Vanezis from the University of Glasgow and Dr Martin McGregor (University of Glasgow) and Prof Caroline Wilkinson (Face Lab at Liverpool John Moores University).

== Issue ==
Child by Isabella of Mar
Name	Birth	Death	Notes
Marjorie	1296	2 March 1316	Married in 1315 Walter Stewart, 6th High Steward of Scotland, by whom she had one child (Robert II of Scotland).
Children by Elizabeth de Burgh
Name	Birth	Death	Notes
Margaret	unknown	1346/47	Married in 1345 William de Moravia, 5th Earl of Sutherland; had a son, John (1346–1361).
Matilda (Maud)	by 1327	1353	Married Thomas Isaac and had two daughters. Buried at Dunfermline Abbey.
David	5 March 1324	22 February 1371	Succeeded his father. Married (1) in 1328 Joan of England; no issue; married (2) in 1364 Margaret Drummond; no issue.
John	5 March 1324	Before 1327	Twin brother of David II.
Elizabeth Bruce	unknown	After 1364	Married Sir Walter Oliphant of Aberdalgie and Dupplin.
Illegitimate children by unknown mothers
Name	Birth	Death	Notes
Robert Bruce, Lord of Liddesdale		1332	Killed at the Battle of Dupplin Moor.
Walter of Odistoun			Predeceased his father.
Margaret Bruce			Married Robert Glen; alive in 1364.
Christina Bruce			May not have been a daughter of Robert. Recorded are the names Christina de Cairns and Christina Flemyng. Possibly identical to a certain Christina of Carrick attested in 1329.
Niall Bruce		1346	Possibly a son of Robert's brother Neil. Killed at the Battle of Neville's Cross.

Bruce's descendants include all later Scottish monarchs and all British monarchs since the Union of the Crowns in 1603. A large number of families definitely are descended from him.

== Ancestry ==
Ancestors of Robert the Bruce

8. Robert de Brus, 4th Lord of Annandale
4. Robert de Brus, 5th Lord of Annandale
9. Isobel of Huntingdon
2. Robert de Brus, 6th Lord of Annandale
10. Gilbert de Clare, 5th Earl of Gloucester
5. Isabella de Clare
11. Isabel Marshal
1. Robert I of Scotland
12. Cailean mac Donnchaidh
6. Niall, Earl of Carrick
3. Marjorie, Countess of Carrick
14. Walter Stewart, 3rd High Steward of Scotland
7. Margaret Stewart
15. Bethóc of Angus

Descended from the Scoto-Norman, Hiberno-Norman, Irish and Scottish Gaelic nobilities, through his father he was a fourth-great-grandson of David I, as well as claiming ancestry ultimately descended from Aoife MacMurrough and Richard (Strongbow) de Clare, 2nd Earl of Pembroke, King of Leinster and Governor of Ireland and William Marshal, 1st Earl of Pembroke. As well as Henry I of England amongst his paternal ancestors. Robert's grandfather Robert de Brus, 5th Lord of Annandale, was one of the claimants to the Scottish throne during the "Great Cause".

== Legacy ==
=== Commemoration and monuments ===
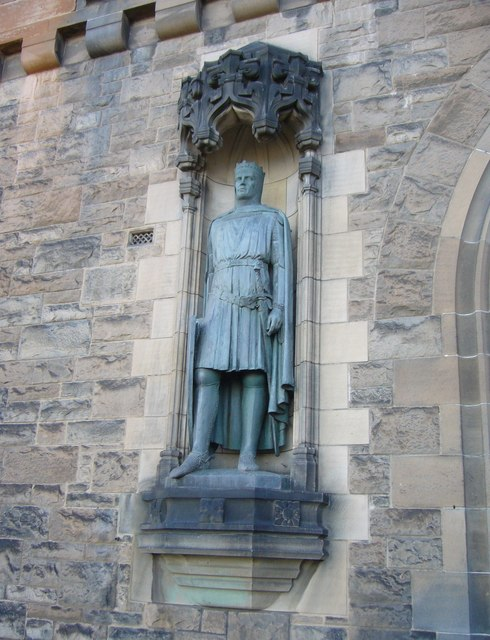
Bruce statue at the entrance to Edinburgh Castle

Robert I was originally buried in Dunfermline Abbey, the traditional resting place of Scottish monarchs since the reign of Malcolm Canmore. His tomb, imported from Paris, was extremely elaborate, carved from gilded alabaster. It was destroyed at the Reformation, but some fragments were discovered in the 19th century (now in the Museum of Scotland in Edinburgh). The site of the tomb in Dunfermline Abbey was marked by large carved stone letters spelling out "King Robert the Bruce" around the top of the bell tower when the eastern half of the abbey church was rebuilt in the first half of the 19th century. In 1974 the Bruce Memorial Window was installed in the north transept, commemorating the 700th anniversary of the year of his birth. It depicts stained glass images of the Bruce flanked by his chief men, Christ, and saints associated with Scotland.

A 1929 statue of Robert the Bruce is set in the wall of Edinburgh Castle at the entrance, along with one of Sir William Wallace. In Edinburgh also, the Scottish National Portrait Gallery has statues of Bruce and Wallace in niches flanking the main entrance. The building also contains several frescos depicting scenes from Scots history by William Brassey Hole in the entrance foyer, including a large example of Bruce marshalling his men at Bannockburn. A bust of Bruce is in the Hall of Heroes of the National Wallace Monument in Stirling. A statue of Robert Bruce stands in the High Street in Lochmaben and another in Annan (erected 2010) in front of the town's Victorian hall. An annual commemorative dinner has been held in his honour in Stirling since 2006.

Swords inscribed with Robert's name probably date from the 16th century rather than earlier. There is one in the Wallace Collection and a missing one in Ireland.

=== Legends ===
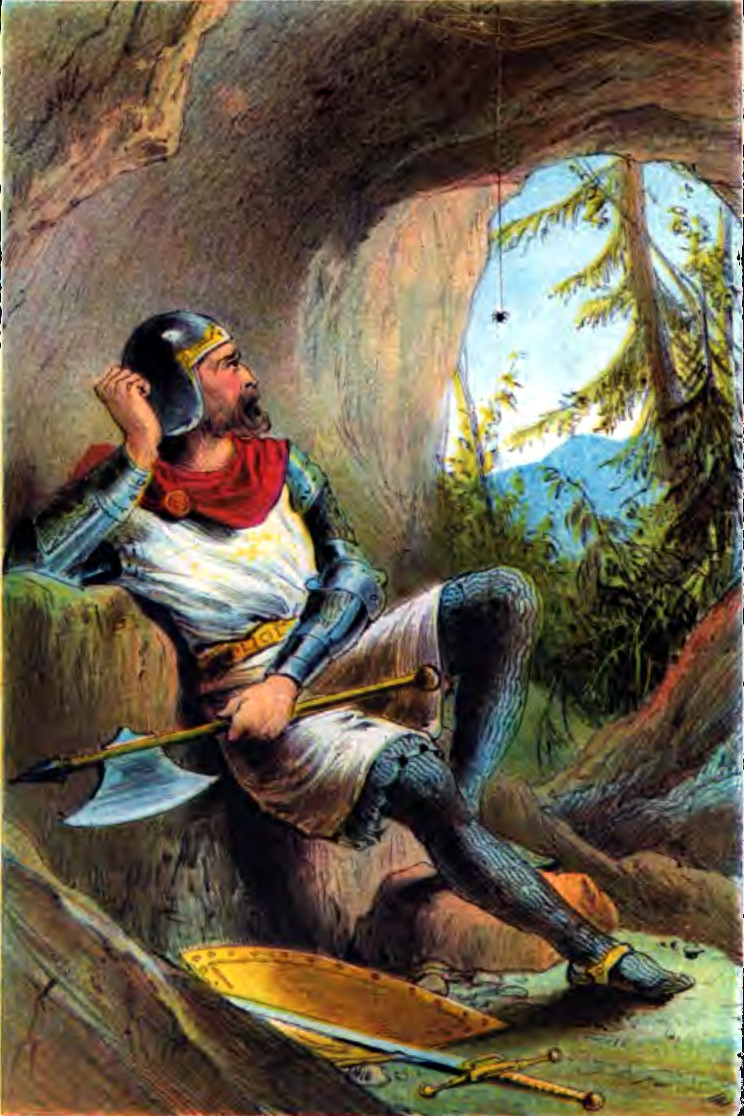
Fanciful illustration of Robert the Bruce watching a spider (Who were the first weavers?, T. Nelson and Sons, 1885)

According to a legend, at some point, while he was on the run after the 1306 Battle of Methven, Bruce hid in a cave where he observed a spider spinning a web, trying to make a connection from one area of the cave's roof to another. It tried and failed twice, but began again and succeeded on the third attempt. Inspired by this, Bruce returned to inflict a series of defeats on the English, thus winning him more supporters and eventual victory. The story serves to illustrate the maxim: "If at first you don't succeed, try try try again". Other versions have Bruce in a small house watching the spider try to make its connection between two roof beams.

This legend first appears in a much later account, Tales of a Grandfather by Walter Scott (published between 1828 and 1830). This may have originally been told about his companion-in-arms Sir James Douglas (the "Black Douglas"), who had spent time hiding out in caves within his manor of Lintalee, which was then occupied by the English. The entire account may in fact be a version of a literary trope used in royal biographical writing. A similar story is told, for example, in Jewish sources about King David, in Polish accounts about Bruce's contemporary Władysław I the Elbow-high, and in Persian folklore about the Turco-Mongolian general Tamerlane and an ant.

It is said that before the Battle of Bannockburn, Bruce was attacked by the English Knight Sir Henry de Bohun. Riding with the heavy cavalry, de Bohun caught sight of Bruce, who was armed only with his battle axe. De Bohun lowered his lance and charged, and Bruce stood his ground. At the last moment, Bruce swiftly dodged the lance, rose in his saddle, and with one mighty swing of his axe, struck Bohun so hard that he split de Bohun's iron helmet and his head in two, a blow so powerful that it shattered the very weapon into pieces. Afterwards, the King merely expressed regret that he had broken the shaft of his favourite axe. To this day, the story stands in folklore as a testament to the determination of the Scottish people and their culture.

== Depictions in modern culture ==
=== Opera ===
- Robert Bruce (1843), Gioacchino Rossini's last opera (albeit a pastiche of previous operas).

=== Poems ===
- Robert Bruce, the King of Scotland (1893), written by Lesya Ukrainka

=== Fiction ===
- The Bruce Trilogy (1985), by Nigel Tranter
- The Guardian Series (2011), by Jack Whyte
- Bound by Honor (2022), by Regan Walker

=== Films ===
- So Dear to My Heart (1948) features, during the "Stick-to-it-ivity" song sequence, an animated retelling of how a spider inspired Robert the Bruce to lead his third and successful revolt against the English.
- Braveheart (1995), directed by Mel Gibson, features Angus Macfadyen as Robert the Bruce.
- The Bruce (1996) focuses primarily on the rise to power of Robert I of Scotland, culminating in the Battle of Bannockburn in AD 1314.
- Outlaw King (2018), directed by David Mackenzie, stars Chris Pine as Robert the Bruce. The film climaxes with the Scots victory at Loudoun Hill in 1307.
- Robert the Bruce (2019), directed by Richard Gray, stars Angus Macfadyen reprising his role from Braveheart.

=== Facial depictions ===
- Professor Caroline Wilkinson and Mark Roughley from Face Lab at Liverpool John Moores University
- Wilkinson, C, Roughley, M, Moffat, R, Monckton, D and MacGregor, M (2019) In Search of Robert Bruce, Part I: Craniofacial Analysis of the Skull excavated at Dunfermline in 1819. Journal of Archaeological Science: Reports, 24. pp. 556–564. ISSN 2352-409X

=== Television ===
- In Rise of the Clans (2018), a three-part historical series narrated by Neil Oliver, David Paisley portrays Robert the Bruce in episode 1: "The Bruce Supremacy".

=== Video games ===
- In Sid Meier's Civilization VI, Robert the Bruce is the leader of Scotland.
- Robert the Bruce with his army appears as a minor character in Age of Empires II: Definitive Edition's expansion, Lords of the West, during the game's depiction of the Battle of Bannockburn.

== See also ==
- Competitors for the Crown of Scotland
- Cultural depictions of Robert the Bruce
- Scottish monarchs' family tree
- People on Scottish banknotes
- Elizabeth de Burgh
- David II of Scotland
- List of British monarchs
- List of Scottish monarchs
- Clan Bruce

== Bibliography ==
- Barrow, Geoffrey Wallis Steuart (2005), Robert Bruce & the Community of the Realm of Scotland (4th ed.), Edinburgh: Edinburgh University Press, ISBN 978-0852245392.
- Balfour Paul, James (1904), The Scots Peerage, Edinburgh: David Douglas.
- Bartlett, Robert (1993), The Making of Europe, Conquest, Colonization and Cultural Change: 950–1350, Princeton: Princeton University Press, ISBN 978-0691032986.
- Bingham, Caroline (1998), Robert the Bruce, London: Constable, ISBN 978-0094764408.
- Brown, Chris (2004), Robert the Bruce. A Life Chronicled, Stroud: Tempus, ISBN 978-0752425757.
- Brown, Chris (2008), Bannockburn 1314, Stroud: History, ISBN 978-0752446004.
- Dunbar, Archibald H. (1899), Scottish Kings 1005–1625, Edinburgh: D. Douglas, pp. 126–141, with copious original source materiéls.
- Duncan, A.A.M. (Editor), (1999) John Barbour: The Bruce Canongate.
- Fawcett, Richard, ed. (2005), Royal Dunfermline, Edinburgh: Society of Antiquaries of Scotland, ISBN 978-0903903349.
- Grant, Alexander, (1984) Independence and Nationhood: Scotland 1306–1469 Edward Arnold. ISBN 978-0748602735.
- Grant A, and Stringer, Keith J., (1995) Uniting the Kingdom? The Making of British History Routledge, pp. 97–108. ISBN 978-0415130417.
- Haines, Roy Martin (2003). King Edward II: His life, his reign and its aftermath, 1284–1330. Montreal, Canada and Kingston, Canada: McGill-Queen's University Press. ISBN 978-0773531574.
- Hunter, Paul V (2012), The Adventures of Wee Robert Bruce, Bonhill, West Dunbartonshire: Auch Books.
- Jardine, Henry (1821), Report relative to the tomb of King Robert the Bruce, and the cathedral church of Dunfermline, Edinburgh: Edinburgh Hay, Gall and Co..
- Loudoun, Darren (2007), Scotlands Brave.
- Mackenzie, Agnes Mure (1934), Robert Bruce, King of Scots.
- Macnamee, Colm (2006), The Wars of the Bruces: England and Ireland 1306–1328, Edinburgh: Donald, ISBN 978-0859766531.
- Macnamee, Colm (2018), Robert Bruce: Our Most Valiant Prince, King and Lord, Edinburgh: Birlinn, ISBN 978-1841584751.
- Nicholson, R., Scotland in the Later Middle Ages.
- Oxford Dictionary of National Biography.
- Ó Néill, Domhnall (1317), "Remonstrance of the Irish Chiefs to Pope John XXII", CELT archive.
- Penman, Michael (2014). Robert the Bruce: King of the Scots. New Haven: Yale University Press. ISBN 978-0300148725.
- Penman, Michael (2009). "Robert Bruce's Bones: Reputations, Politics and Identities in Nineteenth-Century Scotland". International Review of Scottish Studies. 34. Ontario: Centre for Scottish Studies at the University of Guelph: 7–73. doi:10.21083/irss.v34i0.1075. hdl:1893/2721.
- Phillips, Seymour (2011), Edward II, New Haven: Yale University Press, ISBN 978-0300178029.
- Prestwich, Michael (1997). Edward I. New Haven: Yale University Press. pp. 484–486. ISBN 978-0300146653. OCLC 890476967.
- Scott, Ronald McNair (1982). Robert the Bruce: King of Scots. New York: Barnes and Noble. ISBN 978-1566192705.
- Geoffrey the Baker's: Chronicon Galfridi le Baker de Swynebroke, ed. Edward Maunde Thompson (Oxford, 1889).
- Traquair, Peter (1998). Freedom's Sword. University of Virginia: Roberts Rinehart Publishers. ISBN 978-1570982477.
- Watson, Fiona J. (1998). Under the Hammer: Edward I and Scotland, 1286–1307. East Linton: Tuckwell Press. ISBN 978-1862320314.

Robert the Bruce House of Bruce Born: 11 July 1274 Died: 7 June 1329
Preceded by Marjorie	Earl of Carrick; 1292–1314	Succeeded by Edward
Baronage of Scotland
Preceded by Robert VI de Brus	Lord of Annandale; 1304–1312	Succeeded by Thomas Randolph
Regnal titles
Vacant Title last held by John	King of Scotland; 1306–1329	Succeeded by David II
