= Elizabeth Bruce =

Daughter of Robert I of Scotland

Elizabeth Bruce was a daughter of King Robert the Bruce and was married to Sir Walter Oliphant (Olifaunt) of Aberdalgie and Dupplin.

== Legitimacy ==
Her legitimacy was brought into question by Sir David Dalrymple (Lord Hailes) in his work The Annals of Scotland volume 2. Dalrymple first read about Elizabeth Bruce in Crawford's Peerage. Because he had never heard of her before, he questioned her existence.

There is no evidence to substantiate the illegitimacy and it was based upon two points. Firstly, that Elizabeth is not mentioned by Fordun or his successors and secondly that Dalrymple had not seen any of the charters in which Elizabeth was named.

Dalrymple concludes that "To remove all doubt" the charter with the words "dilectae sorori nostrae" (our beloved sister) if still in existence, should be deposited in Register House.

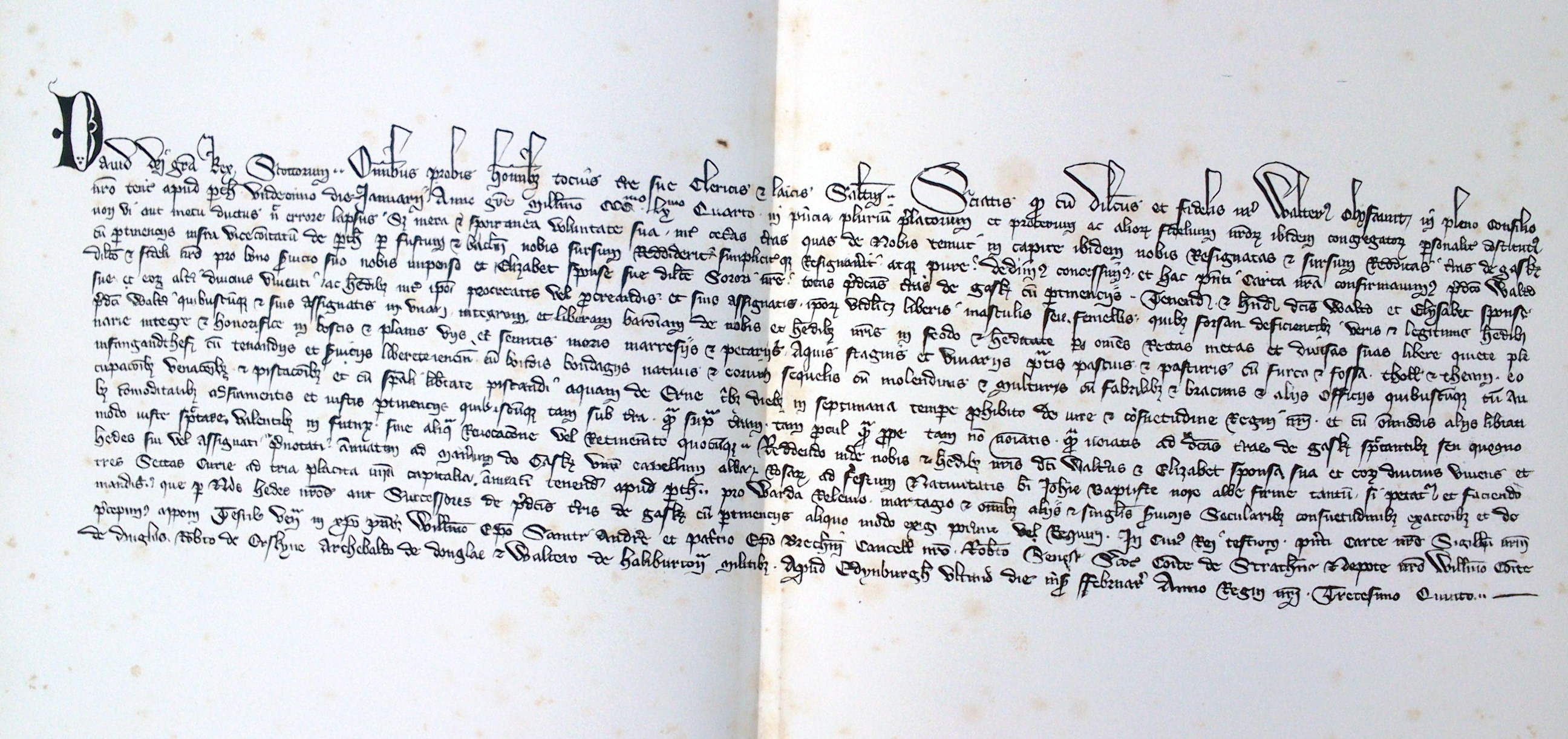
Charter granted by King David II of Scotland to Walter Oliphant and, in the centre of line 5 to: "et Elizabeth spouse sue [his wife] dilecte sorori nostro [our beloved sister]" - one of several similar documents in his family's collection.

In addition to that recorded in the Records of Parliaments of Scotland for Gask, there are a number of other royal charters, mostly similar regrants, of the same date signed by King David II, in which Elizabeth is described as "dilecte sorori me" - "my beloved sister". and "dilecte sorori nostre" - "our beloved sister". which thus remove that doubt. In all, there are similar charters for the lands and baronies of Gask, Dupplin, Ochtertyre, Newtyle, Kynprony (Kinpurnie), Turyngs (Turin) and Dromy (Drimmie). The reason for the existence of so many charters was that Sir Walter Olifaunt and Elizabeth Bruce his wife had obtained reconfirmation of their landholdings and baronies from her brother King David II in 1364.

When Dalrymple was shown one of the charters he promised to correct future editions of his publication. Dalrymple died in 1792 and the correction was never made. Subsequent publications have adopted his omission and propagated the error.

== Personal life ==
Elizabeth's birth date is unknown, but her mother Elizabeth de Burgh is thought to have died in 1327. Although Elizabeth Bruce was certainly alive in 1364 when her brother King David II reconfirmed the estates which Elizabeth and her husband owned, her death date remains unknown.

Given the chronology of her life, it is assumed that she was the daughter of Elizabeth de Burgh and that she got her first name from her mother.

== Burial vault ==
Elizabeth Bruce and Sir Walter Oliphant commissioned a cover to the Oliphant (Olifard and Olifaunt) tomb. This cover was made of Tournai marble and is one of the finest incised monuments of its kind in Scotland. The slab can be dated by the design of the armour of the recumbent figure of Sir William Oliphant (Olifaunt/Olifard) to circa 1360. Oliphant was the father of Elizabeth's husband Walter, and died in 1329, some thirty years prior to the creation of the Tournai marble slab depicting him. The most likely reason for the creation of the effigy was to create a tomb fit for a princess (Elizabeth). Elizabeth and her husband would eventually be buried there.

== Succession to the Scottish throne ==
The most likely reason for Elizabeth not being mentioned by either Fordun or his successors is the fact that Elizabeth was probably born shortly before her mother's death in 1327 (which in turn was followed two years later by the death of her father, King Robert the Bruce in 1329). More important events therefore overshadowed her birth and early childhood. Her late birth would explain in part why she outlived four and possibly all of her siblings. As the youngest child of King Robert the Bruce and Elizabeth de Burgh, Elizabeth Bruce would have been sixth in line of succession to the Scottish throne.

== Kellie Castle ==
In 1360, Elizabeth Bruce and Sir Walter Oliphant were given the estate and lands of Kellie in Fife by Helena Maxwell, wife of Isaac Maxwell and daughter of Richard Siward.

== Peerages ==
It was during the marriage of Sir Walter Oliphant and Elizabeth Bruce (and the lives of their children) that references to the titles of Lord Oliphant, Lord Aberdalgie and Lord Dupplin first emerged. No explanation for their creation is known other than the fact that of the royal connection (in the same way that King David II raised each of Sir Walter and Elizabeth's lands to baronies).
