= Battle of Neville's Cross =

1346 battle of the Second War of Scottish Independence

- Part of the Hundred Years' War and the Second War of Scottish Independence
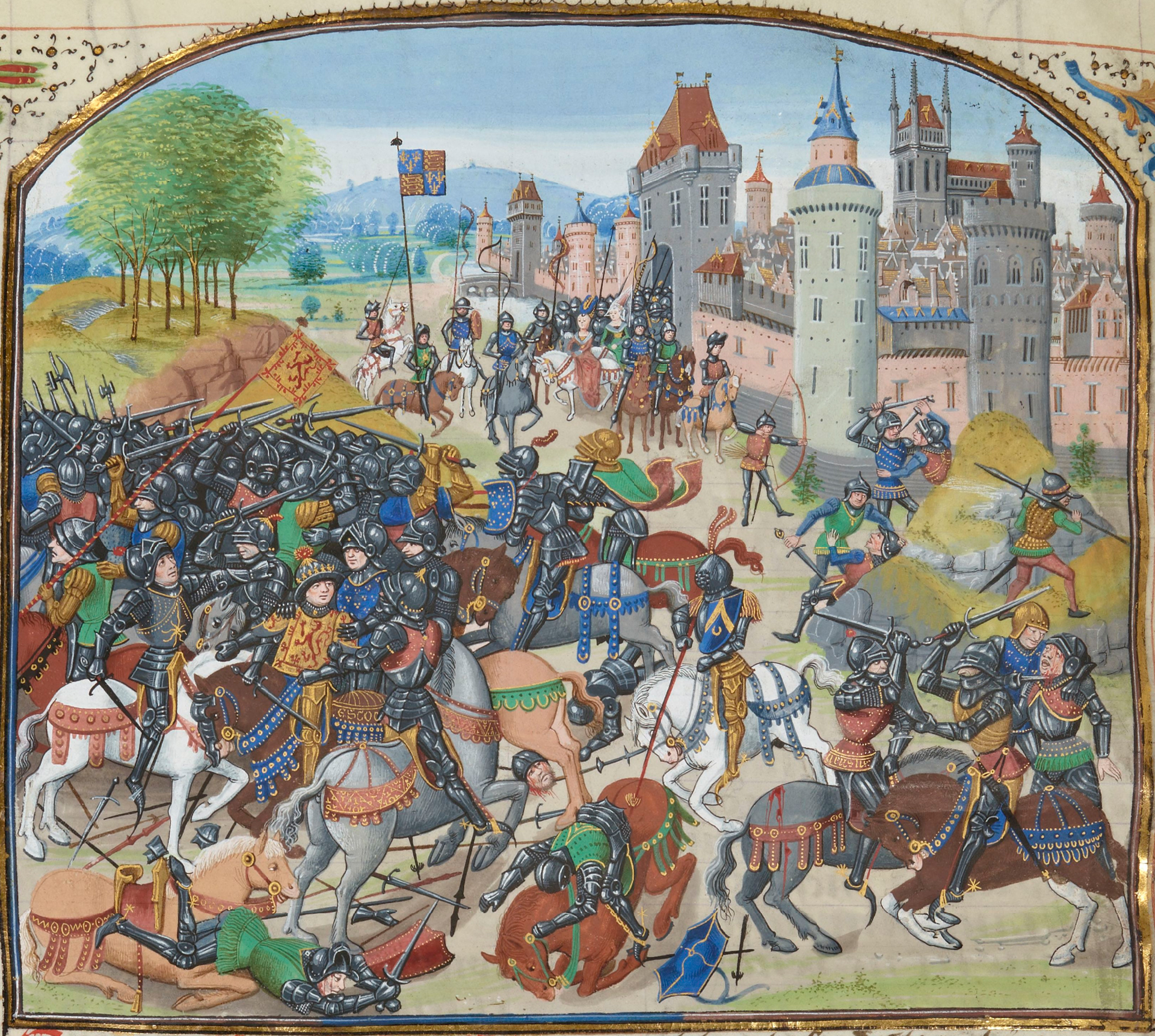
- Battle of Neville's Cross from a 15th-century manuscript
Date	17 October 1346
Location	Neville's Cross, west of Durham, England 54°46′21″N 01°35′36″W
Result	English victory: Capture of the Scottish King

Belligerents
Scotland	England

Commanders and leaders
King David II (POW); John Randolph, Earl of Moray †; William Douglas, Lord of Liddesdale (POW)	Lord Ralph Neville; Lord Henry Percy; William Zouche

Strength
12,000	6,000–7,000

Casualties and losses
1,000–3,000 killed Many captured including King David II	Light
- Location of the battle within England

The Battle of Neville's Cross took place during the Second War of Scottish Independence on 17 October 1346, half a mile (800 m) to the west of Durham, England. An invading Scottish army of 12,000 led by King David II was defeated with heavy loss by an English army of approximately 6,000–7,000 men led by Ralph Neville, Lord Neville. The battle was named after an Anglo-Saxon stone cross that stood on the hill where the Scots made their stand. After the victory, Neville paid to have a new cross erected to commemorate the day.

The battle was the result of the invasion of France by England during the Hundred Years' War. King Philip VI of France (r. 1328–1350) called on the Scots to fulfil their obligation under the terms of the Auld Alliance and invade England. David II obliged, and after ravaging much of northern England was taken by surprise by the English defenders. The ensuing battle ended with the rout of the Scots, the capture of their king and the death or capture of most of their leadership. Strategically, this freed significant English resources for the war against France, and the English border counties were able to guard against the remaining Scottish threat from their own resources. The eventual ransoming of the Scottish King resulted in a truce that brought peace to the border for forty years.

== Background ==
By 1346 England had been embroiled in the Second War of Scottish Independence since 1332 and the Hundred Years' War with France since 1337. In January 1343 the French and English had entered into the Truce of Malestroit, which included Scotland and was intended to last until 29 September 1346. In defiance of the truce, hostilities continued on all fronts, although mostly at a lower level; King David II of Scotland (r. 1329–1371) led a six-day raid into northern England in October 1345. Edward III of England (r. 1327–1377) planned an invasion of northern France in 1346 and King Philip VI of France sent an appeal to David II to open a northern front. Philip VI wanted the Scots to divert English troops, supplies and attention away from the army under Edward III which was gathering in southern England. The Auld Alliance between France and Scotland had been renewed in 1326 and was intended to deter England from attacking either country by the threat that in this case the other would invade English territory.

In June Philip VI asked David II to attack pre-emptively: "I beg you, I implore you ... Do for me what I would willingly do for you in such a crisis and do it as quickly ... as you are able." Edward III landed in Normandy with an army of 15,000 in July. Philip VI renewed his pleas to David II. As the English had also committed troops to Gascony, Brittany and Flanders, Philip VI described northern England to David II as "a defenceless void". David II felt certain that few English troops would be left to defend the rich northern English cities, but when the Scots probed into northern England they were sharply rebuffed by the local defenders. David II agreed to a truce, to last until 29 September, in order to fully mobilise the Scottish army, which was assembling at Perth. By the time the truce expired, the French had been decisively beaten at Crécy and the English were besieging Calais. The French were also in difficulty in south-west France, where their front had collapsed, with the major city and provincial capital of Poitiers, 125 miles (201 km) from the border of English Gascony, falling on 4 October.

== Prelude ==
On 7 October the Scots invaded England with approximately 12,000 men. Many had modern weapons and armour supplied by France. A small number of French knights marched alongside the Scots. It was described by both Scottish and English chroniclers of the time, and by modern historians, as the strongest and best-equipped Scottish expedition for many years. The border fort of Liddell Peel was stormed and captured after three days of a siege, and the garrison massacred. Carlisle was bypassed in exchange for a large indemnity and the Scottish army moved east, ravaging the countryside as they went. They sacked Hexham Abbey, taking three days to do so, then advanced to Durham. They arrived outside Durham on 16 October and camped at Beaurepaire Priory, where the monks offered the Scots £1,000 (£1,150,000 as of 2025 (Note: UK Retail Price Index inflation figures are based on data from Clark, Gregory (2017). "The Annual RPI and Average Earnings for Britain, 1209 to Present (New Series)". MeasuringWorth. Retrieved 28 October 2018. To give a very rough idea of earning power, an English foot-soldier could expect to earn £1 in wages in approximately 3 months for, usually seasonal, military service.)) in protection money to be paid on 18 October.

The invasion had been expected by the English for some time; two years earlier the Chancellor of England had told parliament the Scots were "saying quite openly that they will break the truce as soon as our adversary [France] desires and will march into England". Once the Scots invaded, an army was quickly mobilised at Richmond in north Yorkshire under the supervision of William de la Zouche, the Archbishop of York, who was Lord Warden of the Marches. It was not a large army: 3,000–4,000 men from the northern English counties of Cumberland, Northumberland and Lancashire; it is known that Lancashire contributed 1,200 longbowmen and a small number of lightly armed border cavalry, known as hobelars. Another 3,000 Yorkshiremen were en route to reinforce the English forces. This was possible because Edward III, when raising his army to invade France, had exempted the counties north of the River Humber. On 14 October, while the Scots were sacking Hexham Abbey, the Archbishop decided not to wait for the Yorkshire troops and marched north-west towards Barnard Castle, and then rapidly north-east to Durham. He was joined en route by the Yorkshire contingent, and Lord Ralph Neville took command of the combined force of 6,000–7,000 men.

== Battle ==
The Scots at Beaurepaire discovered the English army only on the morning of 17 October, when they were six miles (10 km) away. Around 500 men under William Douglas stumbled upon them in the morning mist during a raid near Merrington, south of Durham. The two rear divisions of the English army drove them off, with around 300 Scottish casualties. Douglas raced back to David II's camp, alerting the rest of the army, which stood to arms. The same morning two Benedictine monks arrived from Durham in an attempt to broker a peace but David II, thinking they were spies, ordered their beheading; the monks escaped in the confusion.

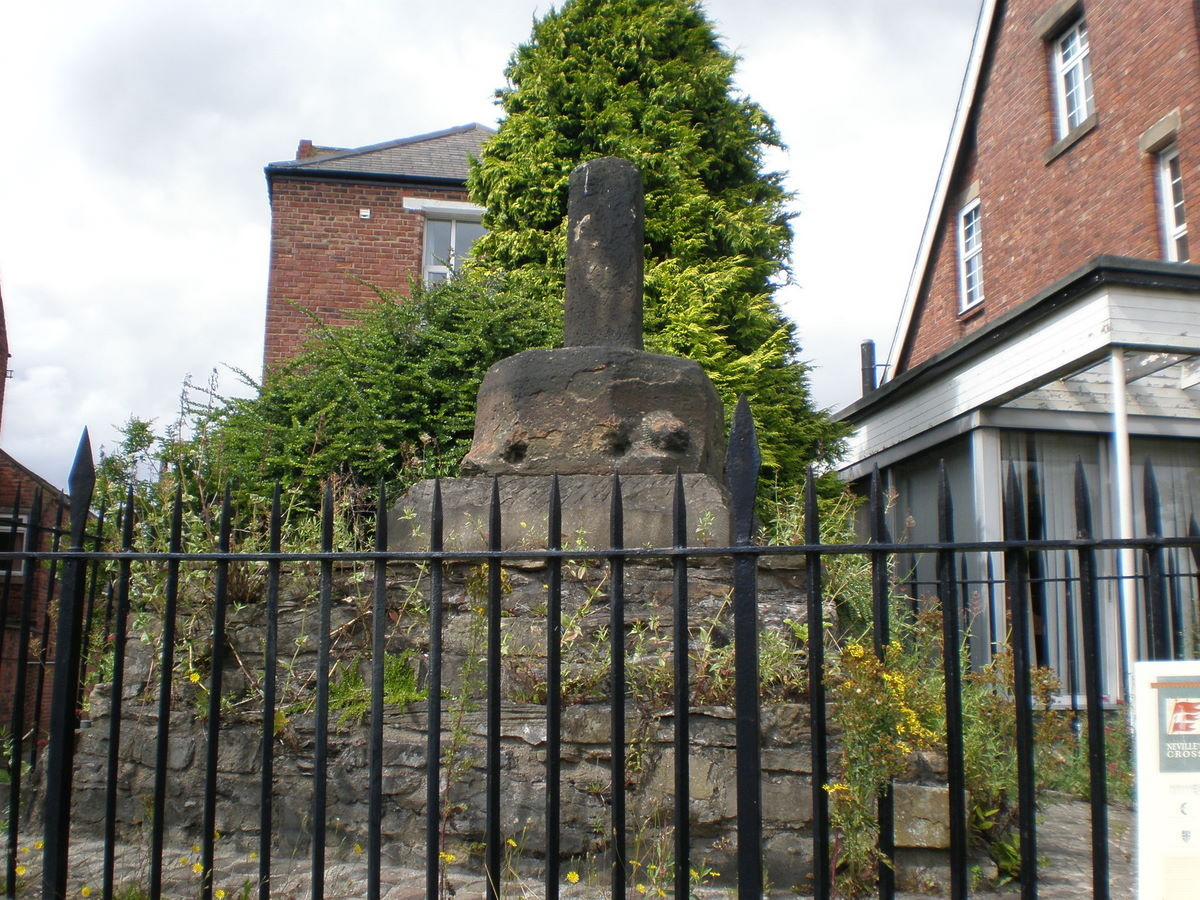
The remains of Neville's Cross, on Crossgate in Durham

David II led the Scottish army east from Beaurepaire to high ground less than half a mile (800 m) to the west of Durham and within sight of Durham Cathedral, where he prepared for battle. Both the Scots and the English arranged themselves in three formations, or battles. On the Scottish side, David II took control of the second battle, and placed John Randolph, Earl of Moray, in charge of the first battle. Patrick Dunbar, Earl of March, took command of the third battle. The contemporary sources are not consistent, but it seems the Scots formed up in their traditional schiltrons, each battle forming a rectilinear formation. The front ranks were armed with axes and long spears carried by the rear ranks protruded past them. The knights and other men-at-arms dismounted and stiffened the formations, usually at the very front. A screen of archers skirmished to the front, and each flank of the army was shielded by hobelars and further archers. As the mist lifted, it became clear the Scots were poorly positioned, on broken ground and with their movement made difficult by ditches and walls. They remembered their defeats at Dupplin Moor and Halidon Hill and so took a defensive stance, waiting for the English to attack.

The English similarly divided their forces with Lord Henry Percy, commanding their first battle; Neville their second; and the Archbishop of York their third. Neville remained in overall command. The English were entirely dismounted, with each battle having men-at-arms in the centre and longbowmen on each flank. The English also took a defensive stance, knowing they had the superior position and that time was on their side; their morale was high. The resulting stalemate lasted until the afternoon, when the English sent longbowmen forward to harass the Scottish lines. On the English left, the Scottish light horse and archers withdrew under the arrow fire and the English were able to shoot into the flank of Moray's battle. The Earl of Menteith attempted to clear away the English archers with a cavalry charge, but this failed and he was taken prisoner. The archers succeeded in provoking the Scots into attacking.

Moray's battle led the assault, but the broken terrain and obstacles slowed their advance and made it difficult for them to maintain formation. The longbowmen were able to fall back behind their men-at-arms. By the time the disorganised battle came to hand-to-hand combat it was easily dealt with. Seeing their first attack repulsed, and also being harassed by the English archers, the third and largest Scottish battle, on the Scottish left under the Earl of March and Robert Stewart, (Note: Robert Stewart was David II's nephew, the heir-apparent, and a future king of Scotland (as Robert II). After the battle he became Lord Guardian of Scotland, regent for the captured David II.) broke and fled, with most escaping. The English stood off from the remaining Scots under David II and poured in arrows. The English men-at-arms then attacked and after fighting described as "ferocious", the Scots attempted unsuccessfully to retreat and were routed. The English men-at-arms outfought superior numbers of the Scottish foot, while the performance of the English archers was mixed. Most of them were participating in their first pitched battle, or even their first combat. Many groups of bowmen conspicuously hung back, while the Lancashire longbowmen received a post-battle bonus of £10 each (£11,500 in 2025 terms).

David II, badly wounded, was captured after he fled the field, while the rest of the Scottish army was pursued by the English long into the night. More than 50 Scottish barons were killed or captured; Scotland lost almost all its military leadership. The Scottish dead included: the Constable, Lord David de la Hay; the Marischal, Robert de Keith; the Chamberlain, John de Roxburgh; the Chancellor, Lord Thomas Charteris; two earls, John Randolph, Earl of Moray and Maurice de Moravia, Earl of Strathearn; and Niall Bruce of Carrick, an illegitimate son of Robert the Bruce. An unknown number of Scots were taken prisoner. It is believed that only Scots thought able to pay a ransom were spared, others being slain out of hand. Scottish nobles who were captured included William Douglas, the "Knight of Liddesdale", their most skilled guerilla fighter, and four earls.

Scottish chroniclers Andrew of Wyntoun and Walter Bower both wrote that a thousand Scots were killed in the battle, while the Chronicle of Lanercost said "few English were killed". Modern historians Given-Wilson and Bériac have estimated that some 3,000 Scotsmen perished and fewer than a hundred were taken prisoner.

== Aftermath ==
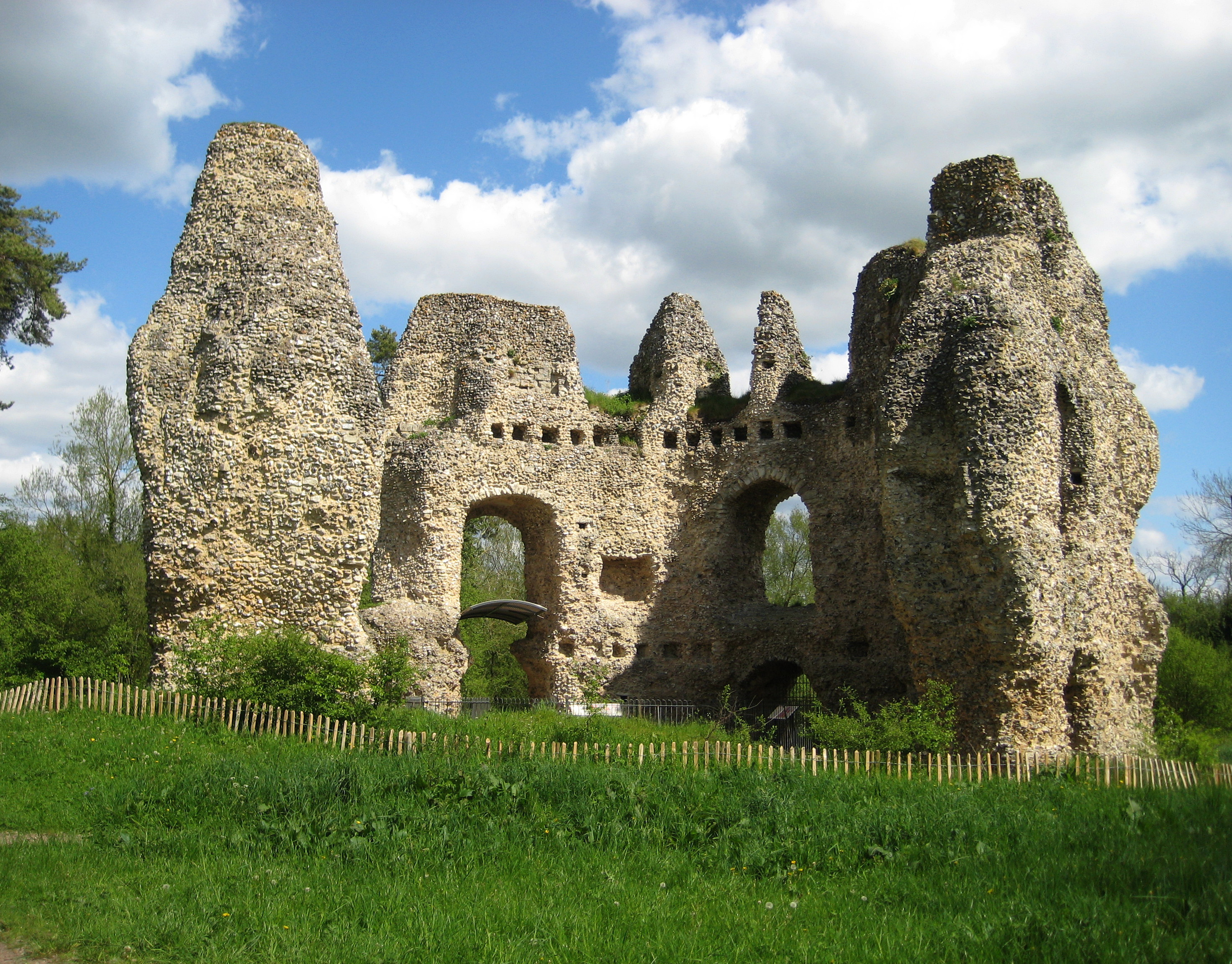
Odiham Castle in Hampshire, where David II was imprisoned from 1346 to 1357

Accounts of the time state that after the battle David II was hiding under a bridge over the River Browney when his reflection was seen in the water by a group of English soldiers. David II was then taken prisoner by John de Coupland, who was leading the detachment and had two teeth knocked out by the King. During the battle David II had been twice shot in the face with arrows. Surgeons attempted to remove the arrows but the tip of one remained lodged in his face, rendering him prone to headaches for decades. Edward III ordered David II to be handed over to him, rewarding Coupland with a knighthood and an annuity of £500 for life (£570,000 per year in 2025 terms). Despite having fled without fighting, Robert Stewart was appointed Lord Guardian to act on David II's behalf in his absence.

All the Scottish captives were ordered to London, to the disgust of their captors who had a legal right to ransom them. A significant number of Scottish prisoners were privately ransomed, their captors subsequently attempting to deny they had been taken, which outraged Edward III. Edward III refused to ransom any of those who were passed on to him, or release them on parole as was traditional; he wished to cripple the Scottish capacity to make war for as long as possible, by depriving them of their leaders. In at least some cases, he paid considerable sums to their captors to buy out their ransom rights. John Graham, Earl of Menteith, had previously sworn fealty to Edward III, who considered him guilty of treason. On the King's direct orders, he was tried, condemned and then drawn, hanged, beheaded and quartered.

In early 1347, two English forces made large-scale raids deep into Scotland. They met little opposition and devastated much of southern Scotland. Border raids, often accompanied by devastation of the countryside, and sometimes on a large scale, continued to be launched by both the Scots and the English. The battle removed the strategic threat to Edward III's rear, and by 1349 the English border counties were able to guard against the remaining Scottish threat from their own resources.

The Black Rood of Scotland, venerated as a piece of the True Cross, and previously belonging to the former queen of Scotland, Saint Margaret of Scotland, was taken from David II and donated to the shrine of Saint Cuthbert in Durham Cathedral. On three separate occasions, Edward III offered to release the childless David II for £40,000 (approximately £46 million in 2025 terms) if the latter would accept one of Edward III's sons as his heir to the Scottish throne. All three offers were refused. Eleven years after the battle, David II was released in exchange for a ransom of 100,000 marks (approximately £77 million in 2025 terms). The ransom was to be paid over ten years, on 24 June (St. John the Baptist's Day) each year, during which an Anglo-Scottish truce prohibited any Scottish citizen from bearing arms against Edward III or any of his men and the English were supposed to stop attacking Scotland. This truce lasted for four decades and marked the end of the Second War of Scottish Independence although intermittent fighting continued.

The battle takes its name from an Anglo-Saxon boundary marker in the form of a cross which was located on the ridge where the battle was fought; and from Lord Ralph Neville, the leader of the victorious English. Lord Neville paid to have a replacement cross erected to commemorate the day; this was destroyed in 1589. A wooden cross erected on Maiden's Bower to commemorate the victory stood until 1569. The site of the battle has been listed as a registered battlefield by Historic England.

== In literature ==
The fate of King David II is recalled in Shakespeare's play Henry V. In Act 1 Scene 3, Henry discusses the Scottish invasion with the Archbishop of Canterbury. The last lines refer to an earlier play which should have been known to Shakespeare's audience, The Reign of Edward III, at the end of which John de Coupland brings the captured David II to Edward III in Calais, where he meets the Black Prince, who has captured the French King.

== Notes, citations and sources ==
=== Sources ===
- Boardman, Stephen I. (May 2006). Robert II. Oxford Dictionary of National Biography (online ed.). Oxford University Press. doi:10.1093/ref:odnb/23713.
- Brown, Michael (2004). The Wars of Scotland, 1214–1371. Edinburgh: Edinburgh University Press. ISBN 978-0-7486-1238-3.
- Burne, Alfred (1999). The Crecy War. Ware, Hertfordshire: Wordsworth Editions. ISBN 978-1-84022-210-4.
- Crowcroft, Robert; Cannon, John (2015). "Franco-Scottish Alliance". The Oxford Companion to British History. Oxford: Oxford University Press. pp. 379–380. ISBN 978-0-19-967783-2.
- DeVries, Kelly (2006). Infantry Warfare in the Early Fourteenth Century: Discipline, Tactics, and Technology. Woodbridge, Suffolk: The Boydell Press. ISBN 978-0-85115-571-5.
- Fraser, William (1878). The Scotts of Buccleuch. Vol. 1. Edinburgh: W. Fraser. OCLC 866515784.
- Given-Wilson, Chris; Bériac, Françoise (September 2001). "Edward III's Prisoners of War: The Battle of Poitiers and its Context". The English Historical Review. 116 (468): 802–833. doi:10.1093/ehr/CXVI.468.802. ISSN 0013-8266.
- Gribit, Nicholas (2016). Henry of Lancaster's Expedition to Aquitaine 1345–46. Woodbridge, Suffolk: Boydell Press. ISBN 978-1-78327-117-7.
- King, Andy (2002). "According to the Custom Used in French and Scottish Wars: Prisoners and Casualties on the Scottish Marches in the Fourteenth Century". Journal of Medieval History. 28 (3): 263–290. doi:10.1016/s0048-721x(02)00057-x. ISSN 0304-4181. S2CID 159873083.
- Maxwell, Herbert, ed. (1913). The Chronicle of Lanercost, 1272–1346: Translated, with notes. Glasgow: J. Maclehose and Sons. OCLC 457526322.
- Oman, Charles (1998) [1924]. A History of the Art of War in the Middle Ages: 1278–1485 A.D. London: Greenhill Books. ISBN 978-1-85367-332-0.
- Penman, Michael (2004). David II. East Linton, East Lothian: Tuckwell Press. ISBN 978-1-86232-202-8.
- Prestwich, Michael C. (1980). The Three Edwards: War and State in England 1272–1377. London: Weidenfeld and Nicolson. ISBN 0-297-77730-0. OCLC 611186058.
- Prestwich, Michael; Rollason, David (1998). The Battle of Neville's Cross, 1346. Stamford: Shaun Tyas for the North-East England History Institute. ISBN 978-1-900289-19-1.
- Rogers, Clifford J. (1998). "The Scottish invasion of 1346". Northern History. xxxiv. ISSN 0078-172X.
- Sadler, John (2013) [2005], Border Fury: England and Scotland at War 1296–1568, London; New York: Routledge, ISBN 978-1-4058-4022-4
- Sumption, Jonathan (1990). Trial by Battle. The Hundred Years War. Vol. I. London: Faber and Faber. ISBN 978-0-571-20095-5. OCLC 819663446.
- Sumption, Jonathan (1999). Trial by Fire. The Hundred Years War. Vol. II. London: Faber and Faber. ISBN 978-0-571-13896-8.
- Wagner, John A. (2006). "Neville's Cross, Battle of (1346)". Encyclopedia of the Hundred Years War. Woodbridge, Suffolk: Greenwood. pp. 228–229. ISBN 978-0-313-32736-0.
- "Battle of Neville's Cross 1346". Historic England. Historic Buildings and Monuments Commission for England. 6 June 1995.
- "English Heritage Battlefield Report: Neville's Cross 1346". Historic England. Historic Buildings and Monuments Commission for England. 1995.
