= Niall Bruce of Carrick =

Scottish noble

- Died: 17 October 1346; Battle of Neville's Cross, England
- Father: Robert I of Scotland
- Mother: Unknown mistress

Niall Bruce of Carrick (died 17 October 1346), was a 14th-century Scottish noble. Niall is said to be an illegitimate child of King Robert the Bruce. He was killed during the Battle of Neville's Cross in 1346.

== Life ==
Niall of Carrick is alleged to be the illegitimate child of King Robert I of Scotland and an unknown mistress. The Battle of Neville's Cross took place to the west of Durham, England, on 17 October 1346. The ensuing battle ended with the rout of the Scots, the capture of King David II of Scotland and the death or capture of most of the Scots leadership.
