= Maino (surname) =

Maino is a surname. Notable people with the surname include:

- Antonio Maino (born 1951), Italian athlete
- Cristian Maino (born 1971), Argentine sprint canoer
- Jan Maino, American politician
- Juan Maino (died c. 1976), Chilean political activist
- Lucy Maino (born 1995), Papua New Guinean footballer and beauty pageant titleholder
- Mauro Maino (born 1966), Italian male curler
- Paolo Maino (born 1989), Italian footballer
- Sonia Gandhi (born 1946), Indian politician, née Maino
- Theodore C. Maino (1913–1997), American diplomat
