= Maino (Angola) =

- Location of mouth

Location
- Country: Angola

Physical characteristics
- Mouth
  - coordinates: 8°37′S 14°52′E

Maino is a periodic stream in Angola. It is located in the province of Bengo, in the northwestern part of the country, 180 km east of the capital Luanda.
