= Maino De Maineri =

Maino De Maineri, also known as Magninus Mediolanensis, (died 1368) was a 14th-century Italian physician, astrologer and writer of many regimen sanitatis—manuals of popular advice on how to live a preventive lifestyle, which were especially popular from the mid-13th century onwards. Milanese Maino was a Regent master at the University of Paris and was later court physician and astrologer to the House of Visconti in Milan. One of his last works, written about 1360 and entitled Libellus de preservatione ab epydimia, focusses on the astrological roots of the Black Death.

== Maineri Patrons ==
Robert I, king of Scots, (1274-1329), Robert the Bruce. In an article for the Scottish Historical Review entitled 'Physician to the Bruce: Maino De Maineri in Scotland', Caroline Proctor says: "The implications for the history of medicine in medieval Scotland are significant, suggesting that, at least at court level, Scots demanded and could afford and attract a high quality of medical treatment." She urged a re-evaluation of the medical culture of medieval Scotland.
