= Halkerston =

Halkerston is a surname. Notable people with the surname include:

- John Halkerston, Scottish architect
- Peter Halkerston, Scottish lawyer
