= James Grierson =

James Grierson may refer to:

- James Grierson (British Army officer), British Army general
- James Grierson (minister, born 1662), Moderator of the General Assembly in 1719
- James Grierson (minister, born 1791), Moderator of the General Assembly in 1854/55
