= International Sculpture Symposium =

The International Sculpture Symposium movement was spearheaded by Karl Prantl in Austria in 1959. This initiative grew from the need to facilitate communication and exchange between members of the international sculpture community. It was also rooted in Cold War tensions, which lent a particular urgency to the need for cross-cultural dialogue on a person-to-person basis. The first international sculpture symposium took place in an abandoned stone quarry in Sankt Margarethen im Burgenland.

Sculptors from around the world joined together to produce a permanent public artwork from local stone, a dynamic which would provide the model for many symposia to follow. Since then international sculpture symposia have been held in numerous towns and cities around the world, including Lindabrunn, Austria and Hagi, Japan (a town known for its pottery) and in Scotland (Scottish Sculpture Workshop, Lumsden and other locations).

The first international sculpture symposia in the United States (and the first on a college campus) was in the summer of 1965 on the California State University, Long Beach campus in Long Beach, California. The symposium was under the direction of Sculpture Professor Kenneth Glenn, University President Carl W. McIntosh, and architect Edward Killingsworth. Several sculptures were created by world-renowned artists. Glenn actively sought “sculptors with international reputations from a large number of countries”. The list of artists included Andre Bloc (France), Kosso Eloul (Israel), J.J. Beljon (Netherlands), Gabriel Kohn (United States), Robert Murray (Canada), Piotr Kowalski (France and Poland), Kengiro Azuma (Japan), Claire Falkenstein (United States). In addition to the artists, “thirty-two upcoming young sculptors and graduate students were selected from all over the country to participate in the symposium as apprentices while earning college credits”. The symposium was the first to partner with industrial companies to explore recent technology and new materials. The collection incorporates a global theme and artists from all over the world who came to work together. After the symposium, the artworks became a Museum Without Walls, a permanent exhibit on campus. .” (Far-Sited 2018, ix) Its goal was to combine technology and new materials and artists with local industrial sponsors. In an effort to offset the cost of materials, Glenn sought the contribution of resources from local shipping, manufacturing, and aerospace industries. Partnerships with the Ports of Long Beach and Los Angeles, Paramount Steel, North American Aviation (Boeing), and NASA, marked the first coordinated collaboration between artists, industry, and technology on such a large scale. Materials used were paints, glass, plastics, lights, metals, and bonding agents used during WWII. Participants also included students and volunteers. The symposium took place during a historical time with social movements that included the grape boycott with labor activist Cesar Chavez, the Watt Riots in Los Angeles which to date is the largest and most damaging race riot in the nation, and the Vietnam War.

The 1965 Long Beach Sculpture Symposium was not only the United States’ first international sculpture symposium but the first to occur at a university. It was also the first to partner with industrial partners to create technologically advanced works. Such industrial partners include Bethlehem Steel, Fellows and Stewart Shipyard, and North American Aviation. The symposium was organized by the Cal State Long Beach professor Kenneth Glenn and the Israeli artist Kosso Eloul. It lasted 12 weeks and included artists from Poland, Canada, Japan, Israel, and American artists. There were nine artists who participated whom all produced large scale abstract pieces made from concrete, steel, and earth. At the time, the symposium responded to the war and politics occurring which centered around human cooperation and engagement. Each artist was matched with a new age industrial representative. For example, Piotr Kowallski worked with the North American Aviation Corporation. Robert Murray worked with Bethlehem Steel. Murray’s piece, Duet is a large-scale piece that is made of three sheets of painted steel. The thick sheets were painted in a unique tangerine shade that was accurately restored in the year 2015 due to the work done by the Getty Conservation Institute. Beyond the pieces, California architect, Edward Killingsworth, utilized CSULB’s 350 acre campus and made all the works and their sites on the campus connect to Modernist architecture and an effort to showcase monumental outdoor sculpture. Most of the campus is designed in a mid-century modern style with an emphasis of an open landscaped area to develop almost a sprawling park feeling. Working with outdoor sculpture proved some challenges such as damage and exposure to outside elements. More importantly, the pieces worked towards a greater goal of conserving art in public places. In addition to constructing consistent color ties across campus through modernist proportioning and close connections to landscape.

The International Sculpture Symposium (Vermont International Sculpture Symposium) in the United States was held in Proctor, Vermont in 1968 under the joint sponsorship of Vermont Marble Company, National Endowment for the Arts, and Vermont Council on the Arts. Participating sculptors were from the United States, Austria, Japan, Germany, and Yugoslavia. The sculptures were displayed at the Vermont Marble Company.

Another symposium was held in Vermont in 1971, with sponsorship from S.D. Griswald, a local concrete company, with artists producing brutalist sculptures with concrete. Following the symposium, the sculptures were displayed along the state's rest stops along I-89 and I-91. As of 2024, the state plans to clean and restore them.

The first Sculpture Symposium in Australia was held at Wondabyne near Gosford in New South Wales in 1986. It was followed by the Barossa International Sculpture Symposium in Mengler Hill near Tanunda in the Barossa in South Australia in 1988. Nine sculptures in Marble and Granite were carved by sculptors from France, the United States, Japan and Australia. The site is now the Barossa Sculpture Park.

As part of the program in 2001, the Republic of South Africa War Memorial Reconciliation by sculptor Strijdom van der Merwe was created for the sculpture park at the United Nations Memorial Cemetery in Busan, South Korea.

The Scottish Sculpture Workshop organised a series of international symposia through the 1980s and 1990s, mostly focused on stone carving. These attracted artists from across Europe, North America, and Japan. Some were linked to the Scottish Sculpture Open exhibition. The following symposia were held:

- 1984 International Granite Carving Symposium (participants included Yoshio Yagi)
- 1986 International Sculpture Symposium (participants included Hironori Katagiri and Kate Thomson)
- 1991 Sculpture Symposium (participants included Tim Shutter)
- 1992 European Sculpture Symposium
- 1995 International Granite Symposium (participants included Horace L. Farlowe, Bjorn Fjellstrom, Kenichi Mashita, and Agneta Stening)
- 1997 International Granite Symposium

Other Sculpture Symposia in Scotland include:

- 1996 Bon'ness International Sculpture Symposium (participants include Hironori Katagiri)
- 2010 Big Art for Kirkcudbright (participants included Marina Weir, Tom Allan, Mike Cairncross, Nils Hansen, Andy Breen, Peter Dowden, and Dmitri Broe)
