= Henry Kinghorn =

Henry Kinghorn or de Kingorne was a Scottish clergyman, courtier, and steward or seneschal to Mary of Guelders, the wife of James II of Scotland. He also held the financial office of Chamberlain in Garioch and Brechin.

Most of what is known of his career as a royal servant comes from the Exchequer Rolls of Scotland, a record of royal income and expenditure now held by the National Records of Scotland.

In 1461, after the death of James II, Kinghorn spent 25 days with other members of the royal household at Ravenscraig Castle in Fife where Mary of Guelders was continuing building works.

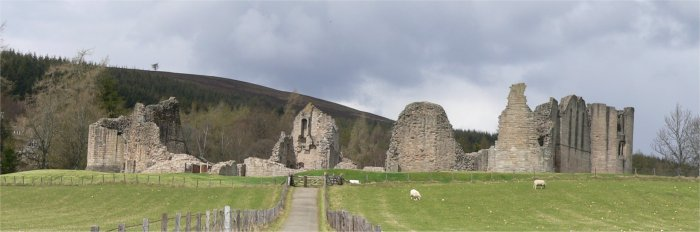
Henry Kinghorn was the keeper of Kildrummy Castle for James III of Scotland

Kinghorn was responsible for building works at Falkland Palace in 1461, including a stairway from the queen's chamber to the pleasance, new stables, a coal shed, repairs and an extension to the counting house, making andirons or firedogs for the queen's bedchamber and the firegrate of the great hall, and other works including the construction of two ponds in the hay yard. The royal carpenter was Andrew Lesouris. The works were completed under the supervision of another steward, William Blair, in 1462 and included a "galry", apparently the earliest use of the French-derived term "gallery" in Britain.

In 1463 Kinghorn paid the master of works John Halkerston for one of his accounts of building work at Trinity College in Edinburgh. In 1468 he was keeper of Kildrummy Castle for James III of Scotland and spent £100 Scots on building works and repairs. In 1471 he spent £80 on repairing the castle.
