= George Logan (minister) =

Scottish minister and controversialist

George Logan (1678–1755) was a Scottish minister and controversialist. He was Moderator of the Church of Scotland in 1740, the highest position in the Scottish Church.

== Life ==
He was son of George Logan of Ayrshire, by his wife, a daughter of Rev John Cunningham, minister of Old Cumnock. He was educated at Glasgow University, and graduated M.A. in 1696. On 4 March 1703 he was licensed as a preacher in the Church of Scotland, and became chaplain to John Maitland, 5th Earl of Lauderdale.

He was successively minister of Lauder, Berwickshire, 1707; Sprouston, Roxburghshire, 1718; Dunbar, East Lothian, 1721; and Trinity College Church, Edinburgh, 1732. However, at Trinity College he was "second charge" under James Bannatine. Although Logan never became "first charge" he did become Moderator, the year after Bannatine was Moderator.

On 8 May 1740 he was elected by a large majority Moderator of the General Assembly of the Church of Scotland, and in that capacity solemnly deposed Ebenezer Erskine and seven other seceding brethren a week later.

He strenuously supported the Hanoverian accession, and on the approach of the Jacobite army towards Edinburgh in 1745, was a warm but unsuccessful advocate for placing it in a state of defence. During the occupation of the town by the Jacobites his house near the Castle Hill, which he had left, was occupied by them as a guard-house. He died on 13 October 1755, at seventy-seven years of age.

== Family ==
He married twice. Firstly, Anne Home, daughter of James Home, and sister of Sir Alexander Home of Eccles, Berwickshire, by whom he had a son, George Logan, minister of Ormiston, East Lothian, and a daughter.

His second wife was Lilias Weir (d.1770) was daughter of Thomas Weir, an Edinburgh surgeon.

== Works ==
His views on hereditary right involved him in a lively contest with Thomas Ruddiman, George Mackenzie, 3rd Earl of Cromartie, John Sage, and other prominent Jacobites. His writings, which cost him some ridicule, were:

- ‘An Essay upon Gospel and Legal Preaching,’Edinburgh, 1723.
- ‘A modest and humble Inquiry concerning the Right and Power of electing and calling Ministers to vacant Churches,’ Edinburgh, 1732.
- ‘A Continuation of the Inquiry,’ Edinburgh, 1732.
- ‘A Vindication of the Inquiry,’ Edinburgh, 1733.
- ‘An Overture for a right Constitution of the General Assembly, and an Illustration of it,’ Edinburgh, 1736.
- ‘The Lawfulness and Necessity of Ministers, their reading the Act of Parliament for bringing to Justice the Murderers of Captain John Porteous,’ Edinburgh, 1737.
- ‘A Treatise on Government: shewing that the right of the Kings of Scotland to the Crown was not strictly … hereditary,’ 8vo, Edinburgh, 1746, which was answered by Ruddiman.
- ‘A Second Treatise on Government,’ Edinburgh, 1747.
- ‘The Finishing Stroke; or, Mr. Ruddiman self-condemned, being a Reply to Mr. Ruddiman's Answer,’ &c., Edinburgh, 1748.
- ‘The Doctrine of the jure-divino-ship of hereditary indefensible Monarchy enquired into and exploded, in a Letter to Mr. Thomas Ruddiman,’ Edinburgh, 1749.
- ‘A Second Letter to Mr. Thomas Ruddiman, vindicating Mr. Alexander Henderson from the vile Aspersions cast upon him by Messieurs Sage and Ruddiman,’ Edinburgh, 1749. Defends reputation of Alexander Henderson.
