= CSULB College of Engineering =

College in California, US

Coordinates: 33.7827°N 118.1226°W

- Undergraduates: 5,000
- Location: Los Angeles, California, United States
- Website: www.csulb.edu/college-of-engineering

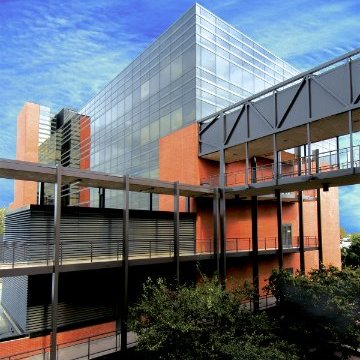
The College of Engineering offers four-year curricula leading to Bachelor of Science degrees in the disciplines of engineering, computer science, and engineering technology as well as master's and PhD degree programs.

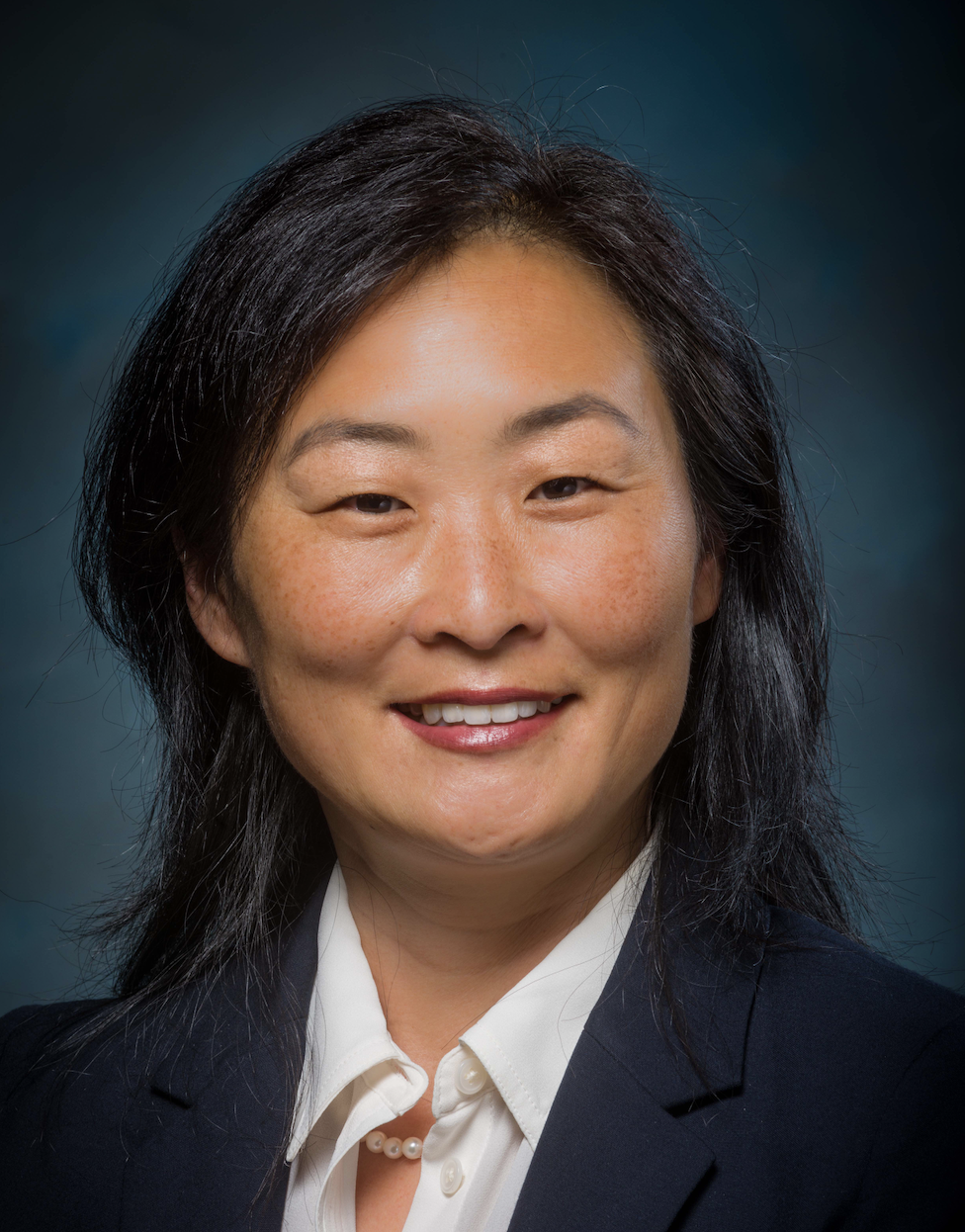
Dr. Jinny Rhee, formerly Associate Dean of the Charles W. Davidson College of Engineering at San Jose State University, joined the Cal State Long Beach College of Engineering as Dean in July 2021.

The California State University, Long Beach College of Engineering is CSULB's third-largest college, with 2022 enrollment of nearly 5,000 undergraduate and graduate students. The college is led by Dr. Jinny Rhee, who was appointed Dean in July 2021, after serving as Associate Dean of the Charles W. Davidson College of Engineering at San Jose State University. The college was led by Interim Dean Tracy Bradley Maples from 2020 to 2021, and Dean Forouzan Golshani from 2007 to 2020. The college's mission is "to develop innovators who design and implement practical solutions to meet the ever-changing societal challenges of Engineering." The college celebrates the graduation of more than 1,000 new engineers each year.

Established in 1957 with 163 students, the College of Engineering offers accredited Bachelor of Science degrees in aerospace engineering, biomedical engineering (pending), chemical engineering, civil engineering, computer engineering, computer science, construction management, electrical engineering, environmental engineering, engineering technology, and mechanical engineering. Master’s of Science degrees are offered in aerospace engineering, chemical engineering civil engineering, computer science, construction management, electrical engineering, and mechanical engineering. Students may obtain a PhD in Engineering and Computational Mathematics through a joint doctoral program offered with Claremont Graduate University.

The American Society of Engineering Education ranks the CSULB College of Engineering fifth in the nation for its percentage of female tenure/tenure-track faculty and is sixth in the nation for awarding undergraduate engineering degrees to Hispanic students. Diverse Issues in Higher Education also ranked the college third for awarding engineering degrees to minority students. The college of engineering was ranked by U.S. News as the 137th best engineering college in the United States for postgraduate students. CSULB's COE also offers options to complete one's electrical engineering or mechanical engineering degree at a separate center in the Antelope Valley city of Lancaster, California.

In the face of a nationwide shortage of STEM professionals, the CSULB College of Engineering is working with the Long Beach Unified School District and Long Beach City College to build a “pipeline” of students seeking engineering and sciences as a profession. The CSULB College of Engineering also works closely with industry partners such as Boeing and Northrop Grumman to ensure that programs remain aligned to new engineering opportunities. Boeing has supported internship programs and donated laboratories and equipment to help prepare students for future employment in the aerospace industry, including equipment from the shutdown of Boeing's C-17 Globemaster III program.

The college also produces the BEACH Women in Engineering Conference.
