= Earl Burns Miller Japanese Garden =

Garden

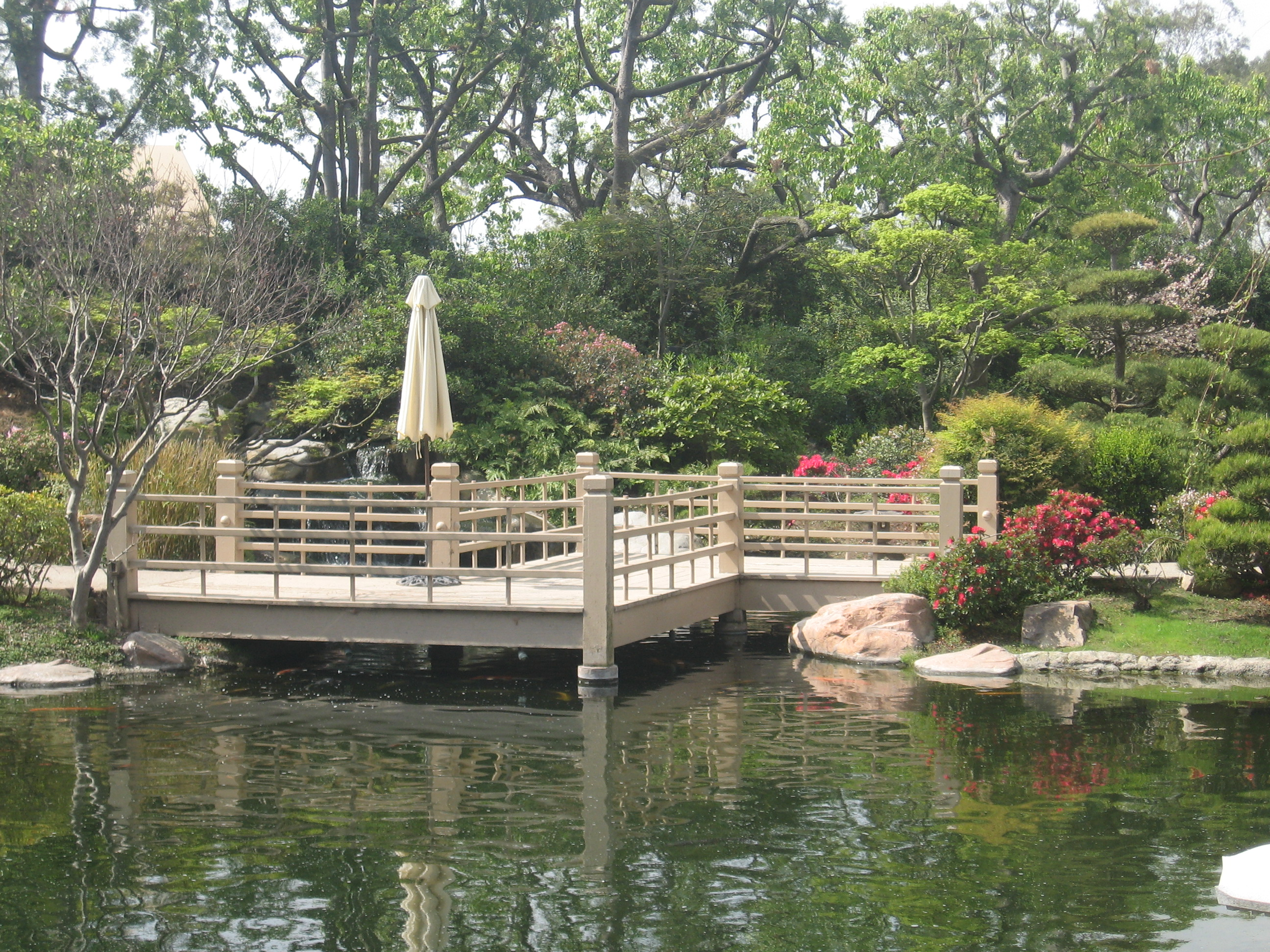
- The Zig-Zag Bridge

- Location within California Location within the United States
- Type: Botanical garden
- Location: Long Beach, California
- Coordinates: 33°47′07″N 118°07′11″W
- Area: 1.3 acres (0.53 ha)
- Opened: 1981
- Website: www.csulb.edu/earl-burns-miller-japanese-garden

The Earl Burns Miller Japanese Garden is a Japanese garden encompassing 1.3 acres (0.53 ha) on the campus of California State University, Long Beach, in Long Beach, California, United States. It was dedicated in 1981. Ed Lovell, landscape master plan architect for the university, traveled to Japan and took inspiration from the Imperial Gardens in Tokyo before designing the garden. Among the annual events held at the Japanese garden is a Koi auction and a chrysanthemum show.

It is adjacent to the village site of Puvunga. In the trenching for the garden, evidence of the ancient Tongva village was uncovered in the early 1970s.

The garden is closed on Saturdays (when it is often rented out for weddings and receptions) and Mondays.

== See also ==
- List of botanical gardens in the United States
