= Kildrummy Castle =

Ruined castle in Kildrummy, Aberdeenshire, Scotland

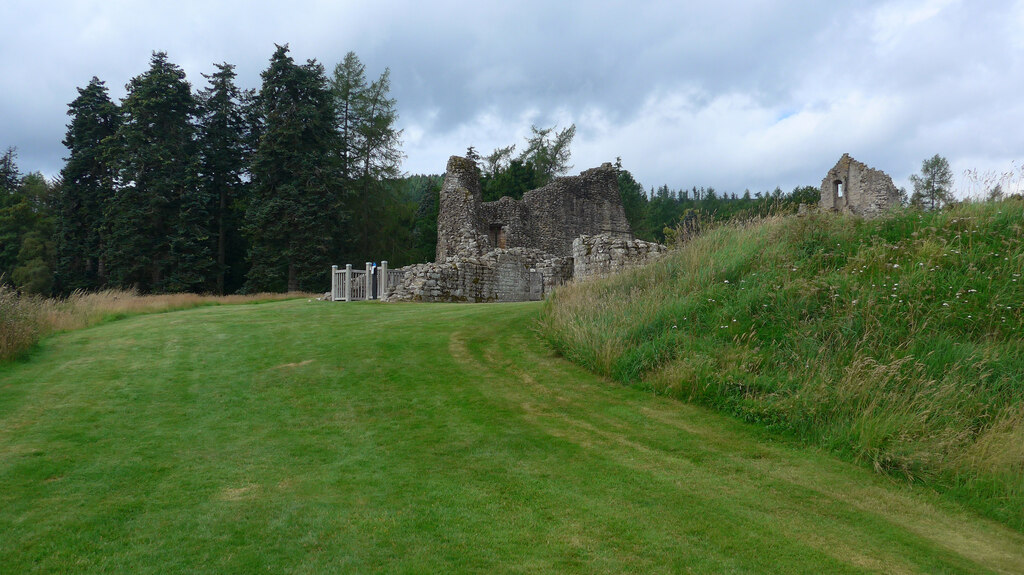
- Kildrummy Castle in 2021
- Interactive map of the Kildrummy Castle area

General information
- Location: Scotland
- Coordinates: 57.235°N 2.905°W
- Completed: 13th century
- Owner: Historic Environment Scotland

Scheduled monument
- Official name: Kildrummy Castle
- Type: Secular: castle; well
- Designated: 31 December 1921
- Reference no.: SM90181

Inventory of Gardens and Designed Landscapes in Scotland
- Official name: Kildrummy Castle
- Designated: 1 July 1987
- Reference no.: GDL00237

Kildrummy Castle is a ruined castle near Kildrummy, in Aberdeenshire, Scotland. Though ruined, it is one of the most extensive castles dating from the 13th century to survive in eastern Scotland, and was the seat of the Earls of Mar. It is owned today by Historic Environment Scotland and is open to the public as a scheduled monument with gardens that are included in the Inventory of Gardens and Designed Landscapes in Scotland.

== History ==
The castle was probably built in the mid-13th century under Gilbert de Moravia. It has been posited that siting of Kildrummy Castle was influenced by the location of the Grampian Mounth trackway crossings, particularly the Elsick Mounth and Cryne Corse Mounth. Kildrummy Castle underwent siege numerous times in its history, first in defence of the family of Robert the Bruce in August–September 1306 (leading to the executions of Nigel Bruce and many other Scots), and again in 1335 by David of Strathbogie. On this occasion Christina Bruce held off the attackers until her husband Sir Andrew Murray came to her rescue. In the reign of David II, Walter Maule of Panmure was warden of Kildrummy Castle.

In 1403-4 Alexander Stewart, murdered Sir Malcolm Drummond and then took his widow, Isabel Douglas, Countess of Mar, by force and laid claim to Kildrummy and the title of "Earl of Mar". In 1435 it was taken over by James I and became a royal castle. In 1468 Henry Kinghorn was keeper of Kildrummy Castle for James III and spent £100 Scots on building works and repairs. James IV granted the keeping of Kildrummy and its lands to Alexander Elphinstone, 1st Lord Elphinstone and his wife Elizabeth Barlow in 1507.

The castle passed from the Clan Elphinstone to the Clan Erskine before being abandoned in 1716 following the failure of the Jacobite Rising of 1715.

In 1538 the castle was raided by John Strachan, the young laird of Lenturk, who took furnishings and fixtures. Strachan brought a blacksmith to remove the ironwork from the windows and doors. Some of the metal was turned into horseshoes and used to mend ploughs at the Kirktoun of Glenbuchat.

In May 1585 Margaret Haldane, the wife of David Erskine, Commendator of Dryburgh, was held at Kildrummy in the custody of the Master of Elphinstone. Lord Elphinstone came to Kildrummy on 28 July 1602 and stayed five days. In 1645 Robert Farquharson of Invercauld was the keeper of Kildrummy Castle for the Earl of Mar and his son Lord Erskine. The laird of Glenkindie also helped to keep the castle, fearing the depredations that a garrison of outsider or "stranger" soldiers would make on his lands.

== Architecture ==
Kildrummy Castle is "shield-shaped" in plan with a number of independent towers. The flat side of the castle overlooks a steep ravine; moreover, on the opposite side of the castle the walls come to a point, which was once defended by a massive twin-towered gatehouse. The castle also had a keep, called the Snow Tower, taller than the other towers, built in the French style, as at Bothwell Castle. Extensive earthworks protected the castle, including a dry moat and the ravine. Most of the castle foundations are now visible, along with most of its lower-storey walls. Archaeological excavations in 1925 uncovered decorative stone flooring and evidence of battles.

== Today ==
The castle was given into the care of the Ministry of Works in 1951, and is now owned by its successor organisation, Historic Environment Scotland. The castle and its gardens, in the quarry used to excavate stone for the castle, are both open to the public.

A hotel (the Kildrummy Castle Hotel) has been built on the old estate, overlooking the ruins.

Kildrummy Castle was the venue for the Scottish Sculpture Open, sometimes known as the Kildrummy Open, organised by the Scottish Sculpture Workshop from 1981 to 1997.
