= Strijdom van der Merwe =

South African land artist (born 1961)

Strijdom van der Merwe (born 1961) is a South African land artist who uses materials he finds on site to create his artworks. His materials include sand, water, wood, rocks and stone. By shaping these elements into geometric forms he juxtaposes the contrast between artwork and environment, growth and destruction. Van Der Merwe's works are often very 'free' in the sense that he is able to respond to nature, but within the context of ' nature having a bigger impact on you, than you on nature'. A site, and the materials it offers, will reveal itself to you as the artist as you walk – be it in a forest, or along a beach, or in the Karoo. Only then will ideas and working methods start developing. It's a process of working with the natural material you find on site. Nothing is planned ahead – it's all improvised as you go along.

Van Der Merwe studied art at the University of Stellenbosch, South Africa, after which he studied printing in Utrecht and sculpture in Prague. He was also a full-time artist at the Kent Institute of Art and Design in Canterbury, England. Van Der Merwe's work is frequently exhibited in galleries throughout South Africa. He has done commissions throughout the world, including Turkey, France, Belgium, Sweden, Japan, Italy and Australia.

Exhibitions and commissions on invitation were done in South Korea, Turkey, Belgium, France, Sweden, Lithuania, Japan, Australia, Germany, England and Italy. He held many personal exhibitions in various art galleries in the past years and his work has been bought by numerous private and public collectors. He has commissioned sculptures for the following: Europo Parkos in Lithuania; Art Park in Art Sella, Borgu Falsugano in Italy; Floating Land, Brisbane, Australia. In 2002 he was the co-curator of the first Spier Outdoor Sculpture Biennale in conjunction with the Jan Marais Nature Reserve in Stellenbosch.

His 2001 memorial sculpture Reconciliation at the United Nations Memorial Cemetery in Busan, South Korea was created as part of the International Sculpture Symposium.

Van Der Merwe is co-founder of the first South African Land Art Biennale, entitled Site_Specific, giving artists the platform and opportunity to engage with art in the landscape. The first biennale was in Plettenberg Bay in 2011, with the second biennale in August 2013.

A new documentary feature film about Van Der Merwe titled 'Sculpting This Earth' and directed by Victor van Aswegen is currently in production, with filming scheduled to complete in December 2021.

== Awards ==
- Recipient of the Jackson Pollock-Krasner Foundation Grant
- Medal of Honor from the South African Academy of Arts and Science.
- Nominated for the Daimler Chrysler award for sculpture in Public Spaces 2008
