= Ailsa Magnus =

Scottish sculptor (born 1967)

Ailsa Magnus (born 1967) is a Scottish sculptor. She has created many sculptures by commission, which stand in locations in Britain.

== Life ==
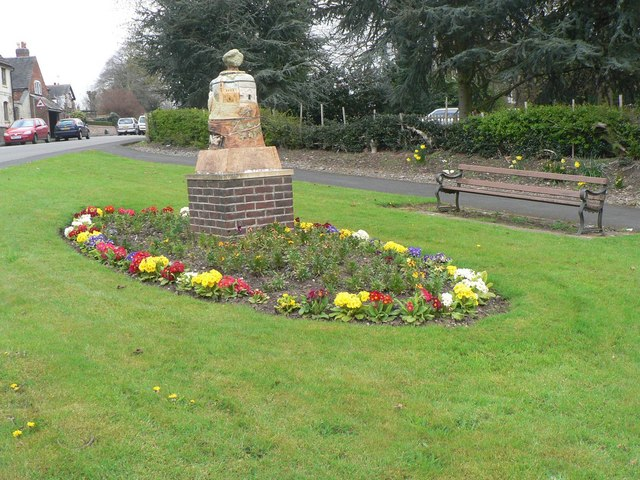
Ibstock Landmark Sculpture

Magnus was born in Cupar, Fife; she studied sculpture at the Edinburgh College of Art from 1985 to 1989, graduating with honours, and gained a postgraduate diploma from Gray's School of Art in Aberdeen in 1990. She was with the Scottish Sculpture Workshop for four years. She has exhibited at the Scottish Sculpture Open and elsewhere and has held several residencies. She is a member of the Royal Society of Sculptors.

== Works ==
Magnus has written: "The motivation for the work is the opportunity to make and place works of an enduring quality, both aesthetically and literally, in the environment". Her works include the following:

"Ibstock Landmark Sculpture", of 1998, is in High Street, Ibstock, Leicestershire. It was commissioned by the North West Leicestershire District Council and Ibstock Parish Council. A ceramic sculpture, on a brick and cement pedestal, shows the history and landmarks of the town.

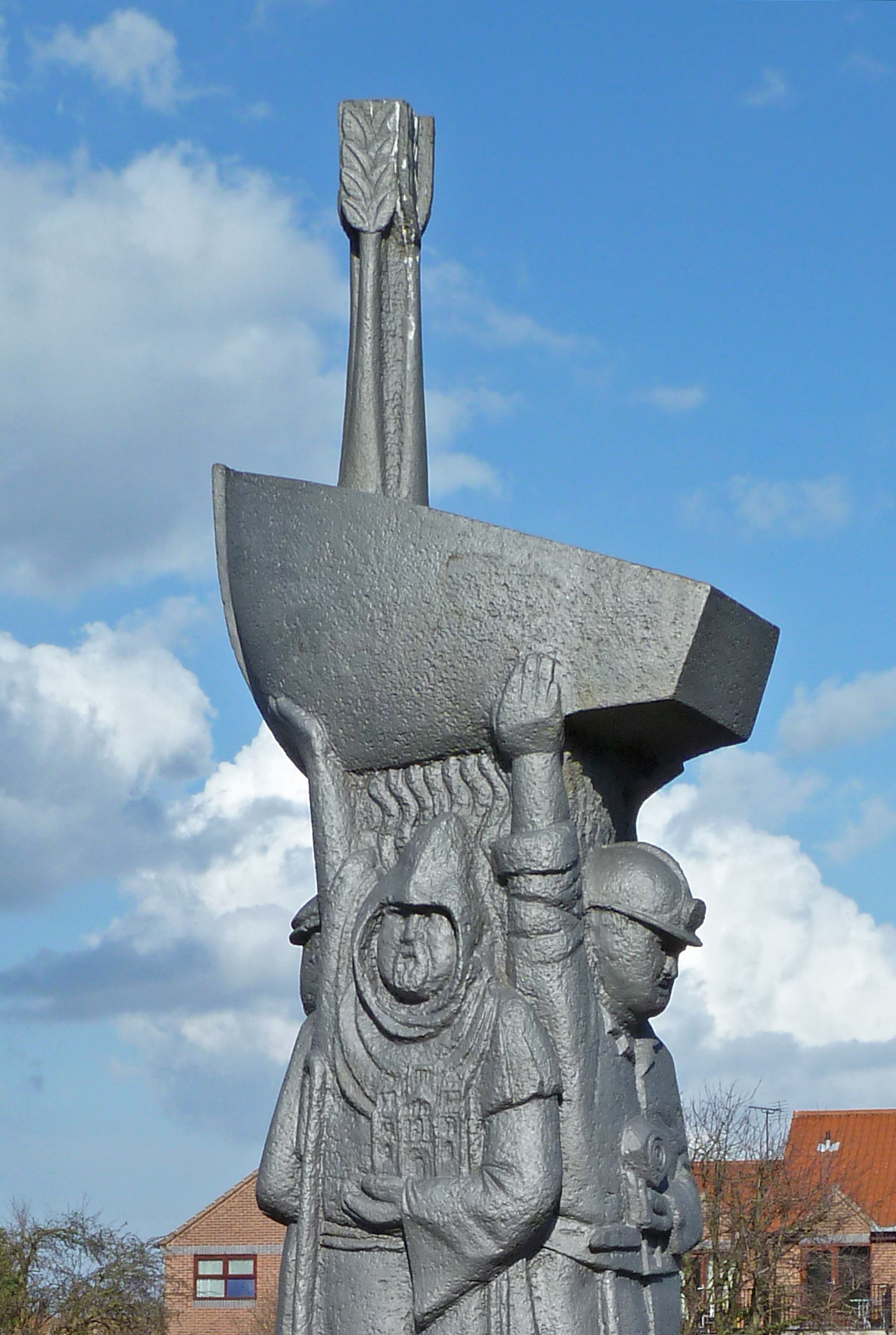
"Relaunch", in Selby

"Boundary Stone", of 2000, made in collaboration with Keith Seddon for Silkstone Parish Council, is in High Street, Silkstone, South Yorkshire. It is made of sandstone with ceramic details. A metal plaque briefly describes the 19th-century Silkstone Waggonway.

"Relaunch", in the Waterfront Garden in Selby, North Yorkshire, and "Three Swans", nearby on Ousegate, were commissioned by Selby Council and installed in 2009. Made of galvanised cast iron on a plinth of handmade bricks, "Relaunch" depicts four figures, a Monk, a Miller, a Miner, and a Marine Engineer, each important to the history of Selby. "Three Swans", made of galvanised cast iron, relates to the town's coat of arms.

"Fauldhouse Mining Tribute", created with the artist Billy Caulfield, was installed in 2022 in Fauldhouse, West Lothian. The sculpture, supported by West Lothian Council, celebrates the history of mining in the area and shows several miners and the inscription "Fauldhouse a Community Built on Coal".
