= Trinity College Kirk =

Royal collegiate church in Edinburgh, Scotland

Coordinates: 55°57′10″N 3°11′10″W

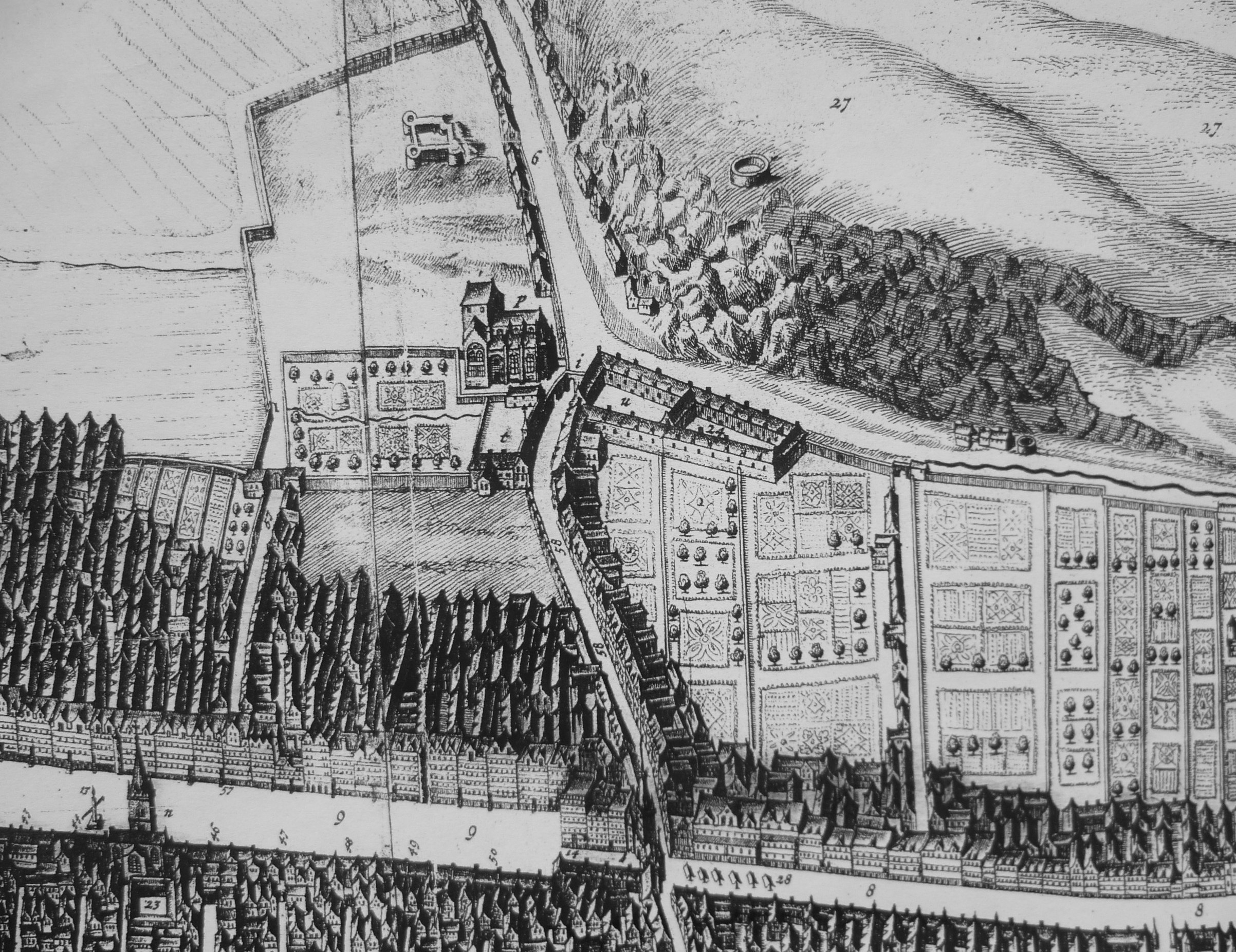
Trinity College Kirk c. 1647

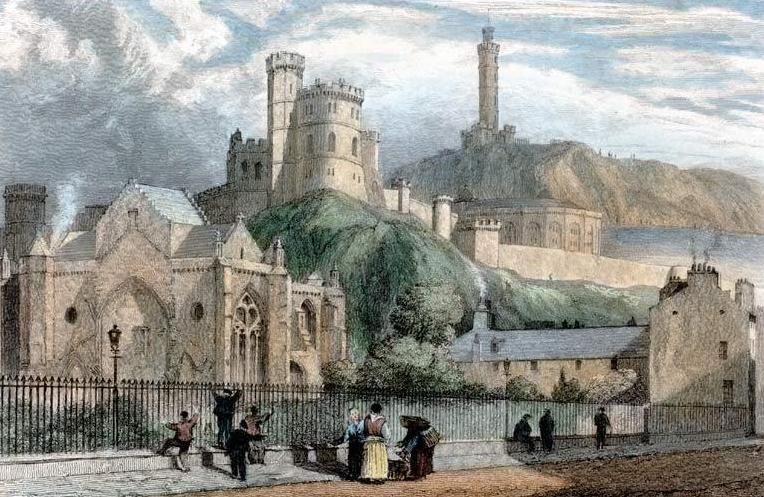
Engraved colour drawing of the church, done in 1825

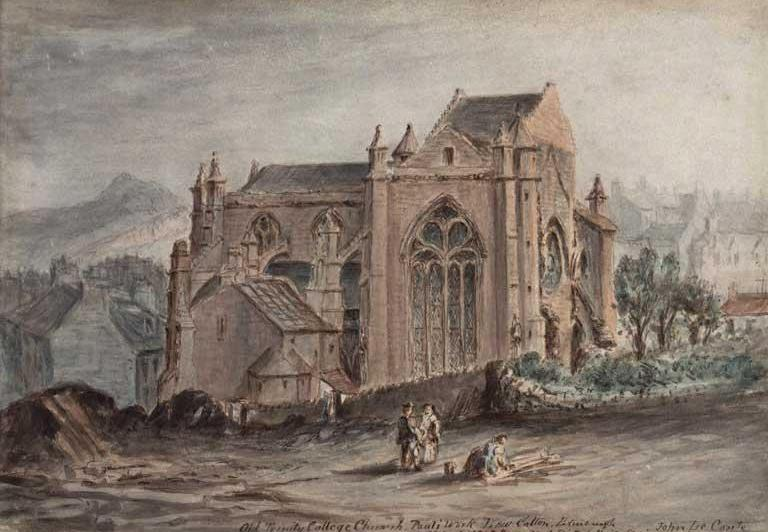
Watercolour from the early 1840s depicting the church from the north side

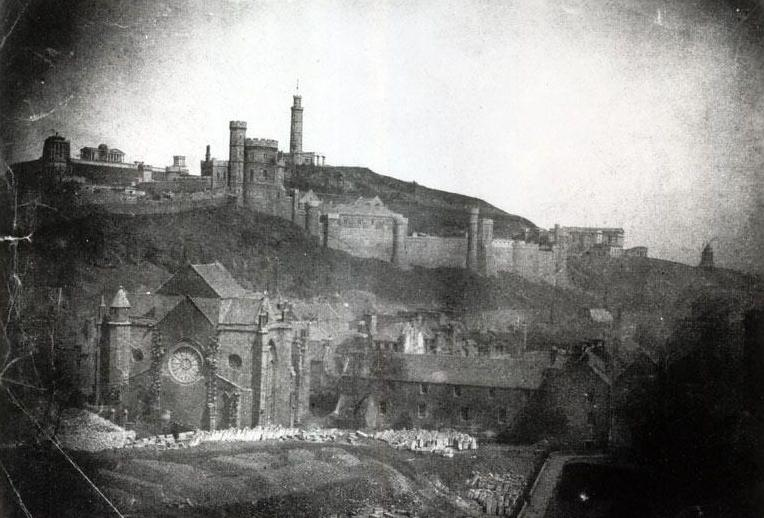
1848 calotype by Hill & Adamson, shortly before its destruction

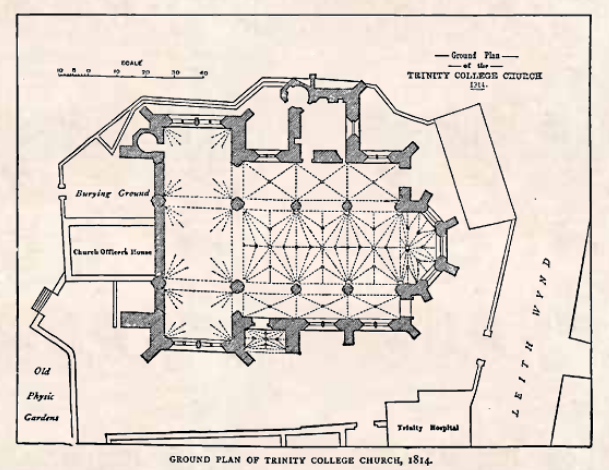
Plan of Trinity College Church 1814

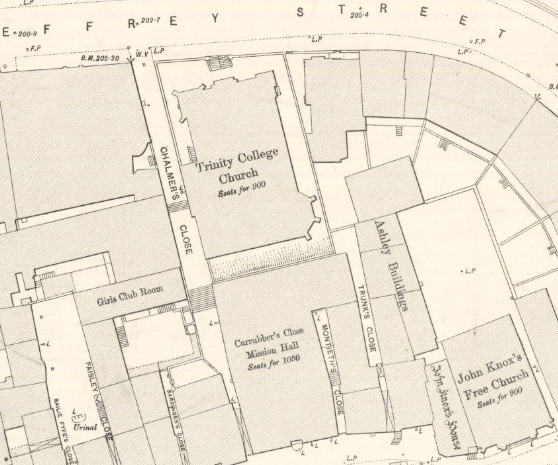
New Trinity College Church on Jeffrey Street (with reconstruction of the choir and apse to the rear) in 1895

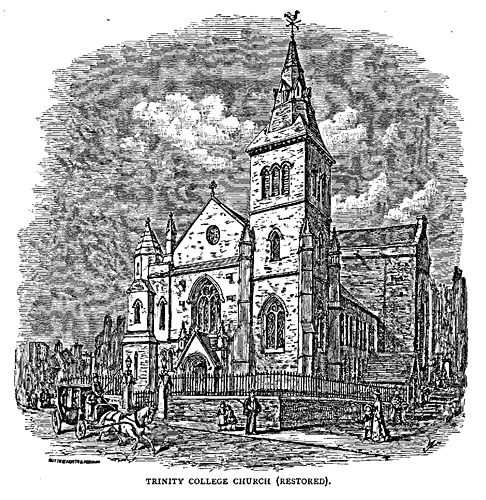
Trinity College Kirk on Jeffrey Street showing the new church to front with reconstructed "Apse" to rear - new church demolished 1960s for office development - now a hotel.

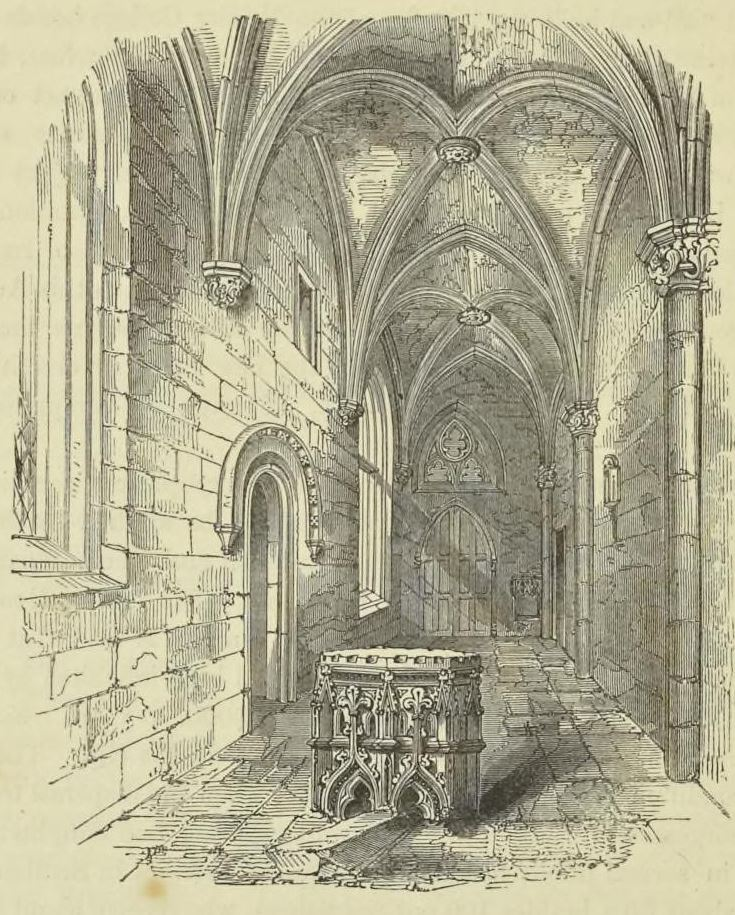
North Aisle

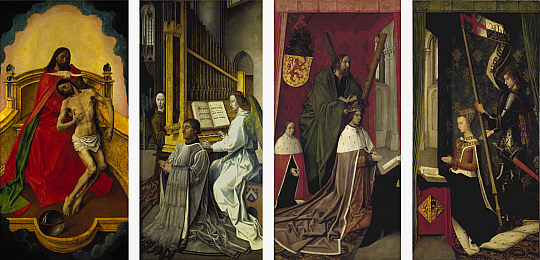
The Trinity Altarpiece (ca. 1478 – 1479) by Hugo van der Goes, National Gallery of Scotland, Edinburgh

Trinity College Kirk was a royal collegiate church in Edinburgh, Scotland. The kirk and its adjacent almshouse, Trinity Hospital, were founded in 1460 by Mary of Guelders in memory of her husband, King James II who had been killed at the siege of Roxburgh Castle that year. Queen Mary was interred in the church, until her coffin was moved to Holyrood Abbey in 1848.

The original church design was never completed. Only the apse, choir (with aisles) and transepts were completed.

The church was located in the valley between the Old Town and Calton Hill, but was systematically dismantled in 1848 due to the construction of Waverley Station on its site. Although its stones were numbered in anticipation of rebuilding and were stored in a yard on Calton Hill, by 1872, when a replacement church was built on the newly formed Jeffrey Street, only a third were left which were used to construct a version of the choir and apse which was the hall of the new church.

== Style ==
The church was built of local sandstone from a quarry which was discovered only 500m to the west at the site of the Scott Monument on Princes Street. It was created in the cosmopolitan Scottish late Gothic style. As was the taste of the time, water was discharged from the roof via gargoyles. Unusually it is said the church had several monkeys within its decorations.

== Foundation ==
Trinity College comprised Trinity College Church, Trinity Hospital, and the Manses of the Prebendaries. The foundation of the college was for a provost, eight prebendaries and two clerks each being assigned particular benefices and land for their support. Income was derived from several sources in Scotland, either by the endowment of Mary of Guelders (from her own allotted incomes), or added later. Incomes were received from Uthrogal, a leper colony at Monimail in Fife, and the parish church of Easter Wemyss in Fife. In 1502 a Dean and Sub-Dean were appointed, their stipends paid from the parish of Dunnottar in Kincardineshire. In 1529 incomes were added from the parishes of Soutra, Fala, Lampetlaw, Kirkurd, Ormiston and Gogar.

== Early history ==
The church and hospital of Soutra Aisle dedicated to the Holy Trinity, was held as a prebend of the chancellor of St Andrews. In 1459/60 the chancellorship was vacant allowing the dowager queen to supplicate Pope Pius II for the annexation of Soutra to her Trinity College foundation – the sanctioning bull was published on 23 October 1460. Queen Mary of Guelders (widow of James II) issued a Royal charter on 25 March 1462 detailing the constitution for Trinity College in which the provost was to hold Soutra church as a prebend but had to maintain three bedesmen in the Soutra hospital.

John Halkerston was made Master of Works. The foundation was confirmed by James Kennedy, Archbishop of St Andrews on 1 April 1462, as Mary of Guelders' establishment in memory of James II, and "for the weal" (wellbeing) of his soul, "as well of all the Kings and Queens of Scotland deceased, and for the health of the most illustrious prince, James King of Scotland, our son".

In August 1463 Pope Pius II declared by Papal bull that religious visitors to the church during the feast of the Holy Trinity on 10 July and the following eight days, over the next five years, would be granted a plenary indulgence, if they contributed to the fund for completion of the building according to their financial ability. The money was to be put in a locked box with two keys kept by the Provost and the Papal Collector for Scotland. A third of the receipts were to be given to the Catholic church for its general work.

The church was famed for its triptych altarpiece by Hugo van der Goes completed in 1479, now displayed in the National Gallery of Scotland. The four surviving panels depict James III, King of Scots, flanked by St. Andrew and his son, the future James IV, and his wife, Margaret of Denmark. The donor, the first Provost of the Trinity foundation, Edward Bonkil, and his coat of arms also feature.

Early records of the construction of the church are lost. In 1463 a steward of Mary of Guelders, Henry Kinghorn paid the master of works John Halkerston for one account of his building work at Trinity Kirk. In April 1501, James Oliphant, Provost of the Trinity College was asked to produce the "infestment and mortification" charters of the College in a dispute with the merchant Walter Chepman.

On 8 April 1531 the Provost Master John Dingwall contracted with a mason Robert Dennis that Dennis would work to complete the building for his lifetime. Dingwall wished to complete the church conforming to the choir. To help finance the building, James V wrote to the Pope Clement VII asking if Dingwall could grant indulgences to visitors to the church and college on the feast of Holy Trinity and Octave who made contributions to the work. After Dingwall's death in 1533, the masons pursued his legacy left for completing the work. Only the apse, choir and transepts were finished. A nearby house, demolished in 1642, was called "Dingwall Castle" probably after the Provost Master.

After the Scottish Reformation in 1560 the church as a building passed from religious control to the Crown. Apparently the church was unused until November 1567 when the whole of the property attaching to Trinity Kirk and Hospital was passed by Regent Moray to the Provost of Edinburgh, Simon Preston of Craigmillar who then passed it to the community of Edinburgh for the purposes of a hospital for the poor and infirm. Building materials for alterations were to be brought from the demolished Blackfriars monastery to the south. The master of work for building the new hospital, Adam Fullarton, sold stones, lime, and sand in the Blackfriars kirkyard to the masons Thomas Jackson and Murdoch Walker. In April 1568 the council sent four men, including Nicol Uddert, to find charitable donations for the hospital.

The endowed income of the altar of Saint James in Saint Giles' Kirk was promised to the Hospital in 1568. This included the rents of houses at the Overbow and Castlehill. The provosts (ending with Robert Pont) continued to have a financial interest in the structure until 1585. For about seventeen years it appears that the church was the church for the hospital until in 1584 it was made the official church serving the north-east quarter of Edinburgh. This lasted until closure.

From 1813 to 1833, the minister of Trinity College was the Rev. Walter Tait. In 1833 it was reported that he "had given countenance to certain extraordinary interruptions of public worship in his church on the Monday immediately after the communion by a person pretending to speak in the spirit". That person was said to be 'the apostle' Thomas Carlyle. Tait was deposed in that year and went on to become the pastor of the Catholic Apostolic Church in Edinburgh, until his death in 1841.

== Dismantling and reconstruction ==
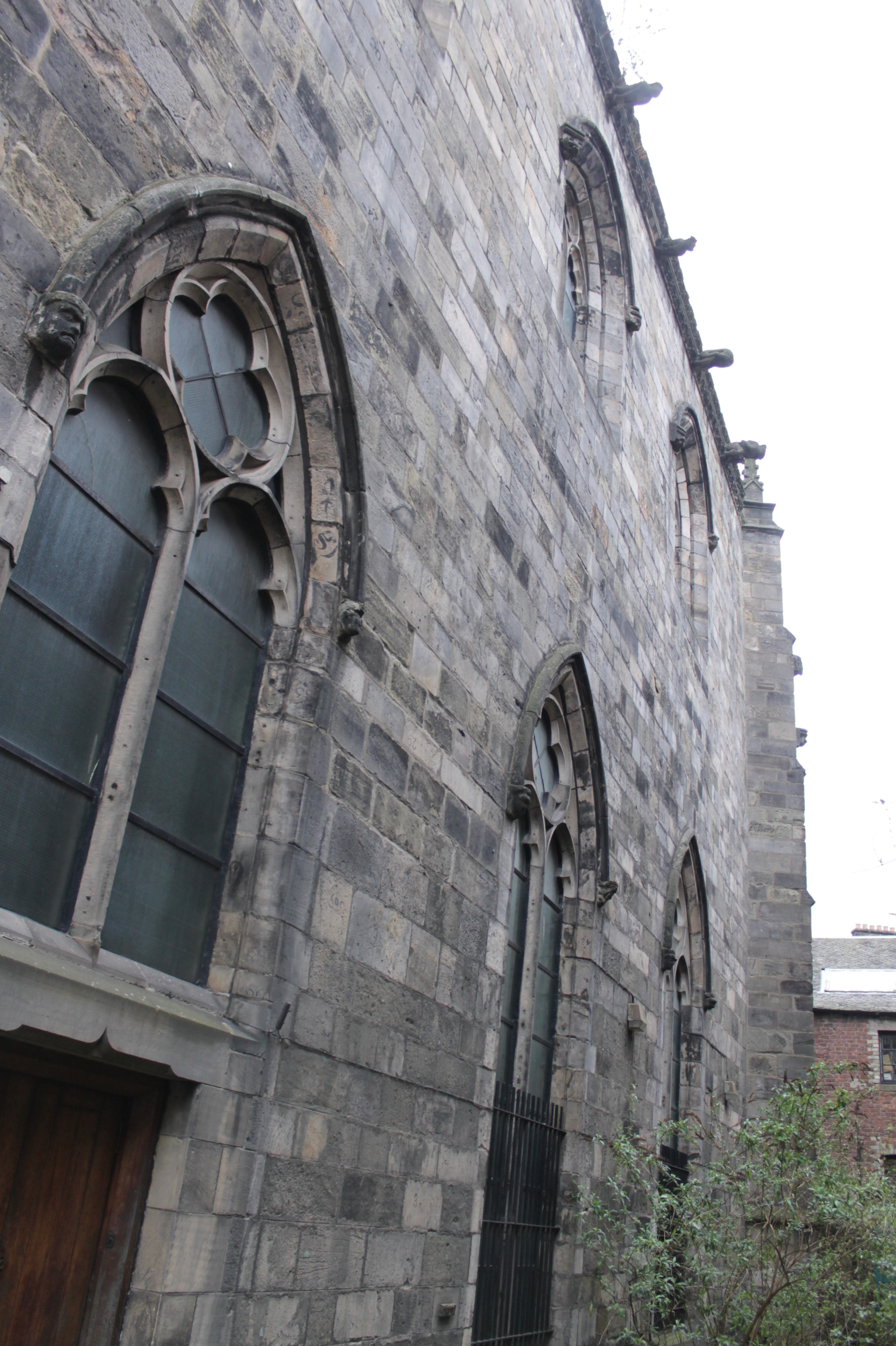
Trinity Apse from Chalmers Close

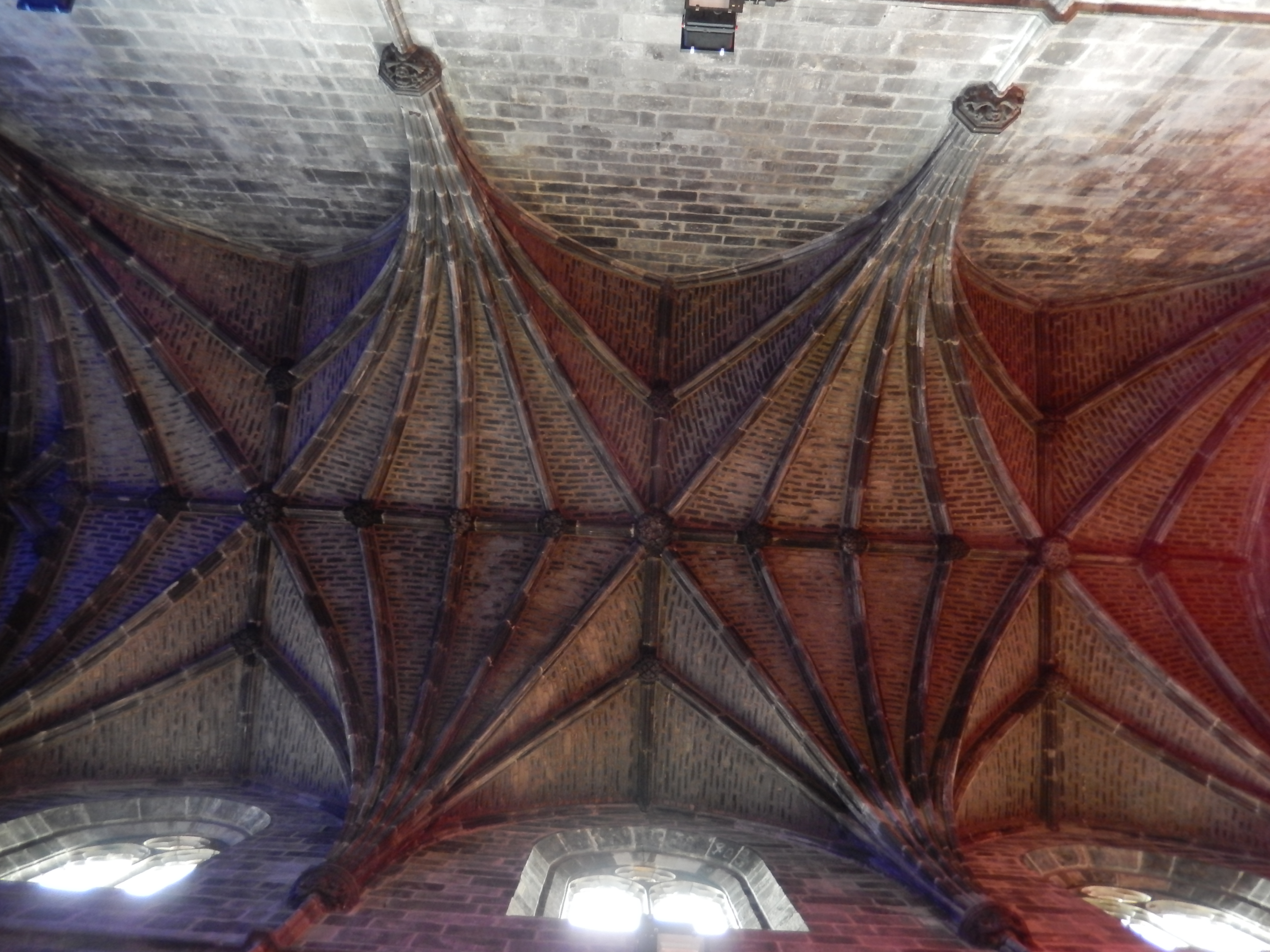
Ceiling of Trinity Apse

In 1844 the North British Railway received its Act of Parliament giving it the power of compulsory purchase over property in the area of its proposed railway station. This led to the demolition of the Trinity College Kirk and its Hospital, the nearby Lady Glenorchy's Church and the Orphan Hospital of Edinburgh.

The Act required the North British to rebuild and restore the Church exactly as they had found it or, alternatively, they could choose to provide to the Town Council, as trustees of the charity, a sum of money in compensation.

The gothic kirk, and its associated hospital, were demolished in 1848 under the supervision of the Edinburgh architect David Bryce, despite a formal protest from the Society of Antiquaries of Scotland, to allow for the construction of Waverley Station. David Octavius Hill and Robert Adamson photographed the kirk before its demise.

To enable any future rebuilding, the stones of the church were numbered prior to demolition and stored on a site on Calton Hill. However, the railway company chose instead to pay the Town Council £18,000 the estimated cost of rebuilding.

In the event, due to delays caused by litigation before the Court of Session and the House of Lords, nothing was done for nearly thirty years during which time much of the stored stones were stolen.

As most of the congregation left, joining the Free Church, those remaining in the established Church of Scotland following the Disruption of 1843, only about eighty members, were allocated the Calton Convening Rooms on Waterloo Place as a temporary place of worship. Around 1857 the Town Council moved them to John Knox's Free Church at the Netherbow (close to the eventually built replacement church) and in 1861 moved them to a corner of the internally divided St Giles Cathedral.

The chosen site for the replacement church was on the newly created Jeffrey Street which had been developed in terms of the City Improvement Schemes. The church was the first building on the street.

The church opened for worship to the long-displaced congregation in October 1877 and held up to 900 people. The medieval font from the original church was repositioned in the church just before reopening.

The new church fronting Jeffrey Street was wholly new and was designed by John Lessels who incorporated several architectural features from the original kirk. The remaining salvaged stones (about one third) from the original College Church were used to construct a version of the original choir and apse (called the Trinity Apse) attached to the rear of the new church and served as the hall of the church. In the 1960s, Lessels' church was demolished for an office development leaving the Trinity Apse in isolation on Chalmers Close. The office development has since been converted to a hotel.

In the 1980s Trinity Apse housed the Edinburgh Brass Rubbing Centre, under the auspices of the City of Edinburgh Council.

The rebuilt Apse, together with carved stone fragments and the boundary wall, is registered as a Category A listed building.

Statuary and stone ornament from the church stand in the gardens of Craigcrook Castle in west Edinburgh (but it is unclear if these were moved at the point of demolition or "salvaged" during the period of being dismantled).

== List of provosts ==
- Sir Edward Bonkle or Bonkel: 1462 – 1495 x 1496
- James Oliphant: 1499 – 1525
- John Brady: 1502 – 1525
- John Dingwall: 1525 – 1532 x 1533 (given a seat in the Scottish parliament in 1526)
- William Cunningham: 1533 – 1539
- Thomas Erskine: 1539
- Robert Erskine: 1539 – 1540
- George Clapperton: 1540 – 1566
- Laurence Clapperty: 1566 – 1571 x 1572
- Robert Pont: 1572 – 1585, who was paid 300 merks to resign the office to the town.

Source: Watt & Murray Fasti Ecclesiae Scoticanae

=== List of ministers ===
Note: One of the founding members of the College of Justice, John Dingwall, was Provost of Trinity College; and several Moderators of the General Assembly of the Church of Scotland came from the Trinity College Kirk:

- 1598 to 1616 - Walter Balcanquhal (1548-1617)
- 1626 to 1634 - Thomas Sydserf (1581-1666)
- 1639 to 1641 - William Colvill MA, translated to the Tron Kirk in 1641
- 1644 to 1648 - Robert Laurie, translated to the Tron Kirk in 1648
- 1649 to 1660 - Hew McKail/Hugh McKaile (d.1660)
- 1660 to 1662 - John Smith MA (d.1667, Prestonpans) Elevated from Second charge. Deposed from the ministry and Edinburgh for refusing to conform to Episcopacy before 1 Oct.1662. The parish was declared vacant.
- 1661 to 1667 - John Glennie (as assistant minister) went to Cashel in Ireland
- 1662 to 1673 - Joshua Meldrum (d.1673) buried in Greyfriars Kirkyard
- 1673 to 1675 - Andrew Cant
- 1674 to 1678 - Robert Laurie MA (d.1678)
- 1679 to 1689 - Andrew Cant (nephew of previous Andrew Cant?)
- 1687 to 1692 - Hugh Kennedie AM (Moderator of the General Assembly 1690-1692)
- 1692 to ? - John Moncrieff (d.1709)
- 1714 to 1756 - James Bannatine (d.1756) Moderator of the General Assembly in 1739
- 1756 to 1799 - Henry Lundie
- 1799 to 1801 - David Dickson
- 1802 to 1804 - Robert Anderson
- 1804 to 1810 - Robert MacKnight
- 1810 to 1813 - Rev Dr Andrew Grant DD
- 1813 to 1833 - Walter Tait (1771-1841) moved to the Catholic Apostolic Church
- 1834 to 1843 - William Cunningham (1805-1861) Moderator of the Free Church of Scotland in 1859
- 1843 to 1857 - William Steven (d.1857) second charge since 1829 and Headmaster of George Heriot's School -minister of congregation in various temporary venues
- 1857 to 1860 - William Smith minister of congregation in temporary venues
- 1860 to 1868 - Robert Wallace, minister to the relocated church on Jeffrey St
- 1869 to 1870 - Cornelius Griffen, at Jeffrey St
- 1879 to 1908 - Alexander Kennedy (1840-1908) at Jeffrey St
- 1908 to ? - William Main (b.1867)
- 1936 to 1958 - William Wilson Morrell (1898-1958) at Jeffrey St (The last minister before the demolition of Jeffrey St)

=== Second charge ===
Not only was the church large enough to need two ministers but (more unusually) the second charge ministers often obtained fame in their own right including at least one rising to be Moderator of the General Assembly of the Church of Scotland. This is unique to Trinity College Church. This second charge was operational from 1597 to 1782, when the building of St Andrew's Church in the New Town took a large section of the congregation, no longer necessitating second services. Notable second charges were:

- 1597 to 1604 - George Robertson, son of Patrick Robertson, Regent of Edinburgh University
- 1625 to 1628 - John Maxwell MA, translated from St Giles
- 1628 to 1629 - Henry Rollock MA translated to Greyfriars Kirk
- !634 to 1640 - James Elliot MA DD
- 1641 to 1647 - William Bennet MA, his son George Bennet became a baronet in 1671
- 1648 to 1662 - John Smith MA (d.1667) Minister to Leslie's Horse during the Anglo-Scottish war (1650–1652). Taken prisoner by the English Army at Alyth, 28 Aug. 1651 along with the Scottish government. Returned 29 Mar. 1653. Elevated to First charge minister in 1660.
- 1663 to 1668 - Alexander Cairncross (b.1637)
- 1668 to 1689 - John MacQueen (d.1733) also Sub Dean of Chapel Royal
- 1701 to 1708 - Archibald Riddell (1635-1708) son of Sir Walter Riddell, prisoner on Bass Rock and minister in USA
- 1710 to 1719 - James Grierson (1662-1732) Moderator in 1719 (the second Second Charge to become Moderator)
- 1732 to 1755 - George Logan (1678-1755) Moderator in 1740 (the third Second Charge to become Moderator)
- 1758 to 1782 - Rev Dr Robert Dick DD MA (1722-1792)

== Notable burials ==
In the floor of the original kirk:

- Mary of Guelders (1463) re-interred at Holyrood Abbey in 1840
- Bishop Thomas Spens (d.1480)
- Lady Sophia Ruthven (1592) first wife of Ludovic Stewart, 2nd Duke of Lennox
- Lady Jane Hamilton (1596) first wife of Hugh Montgomerie, 3rd Earl of Eglinton

== See also ==
- Berwick Castle, most of which was also demolished in 1847, to allow for the construction of the Edinburgh – Newcastle railway
