= James Grierson (minister, born 1662) =

Scottish minister

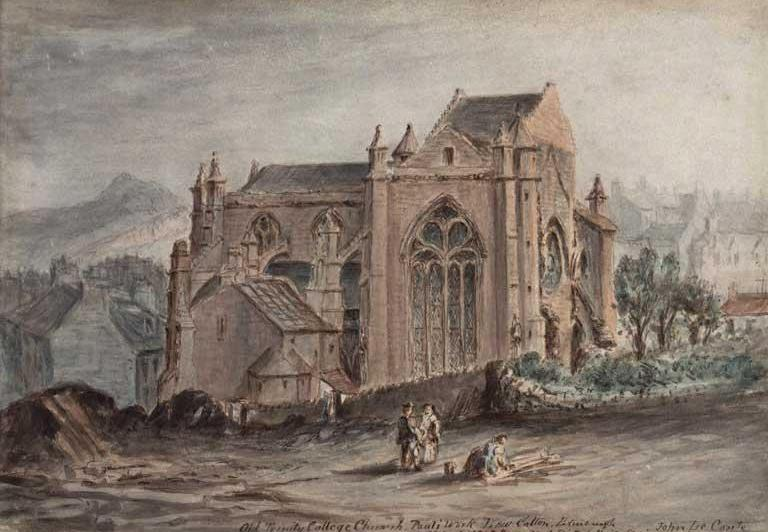
Trinity College Church in Edinburgh

James Grierson (1662–1732) was a Scottish minister of the Church of Scotland who served as Moderator of the General Assembly in 1719. He was the first "second charge" to become Moderator.

== Life ==
He was ordained as a minister of the Church of Scotland in Wemyss in September 1698. In 1709 he was "called" by the Presbytery of Edinburgh to be "second charge" of the highly influential and prestigious Trinity College Church. Although he is recorded as "second charge" it is unclear who (if any) was "first charge" when he arrived. In 1714 James Bannatine came as first charge, but in 1719 it was Grierson as second charge, not Bannatine as first charge, who was elected Moderator of the General Assembly. This peculiarity was partially redressed in 1739 when Bannatine in turn was elected Moderator.

Grierson died of palsy, following a long period of illness, on 5 July 1732.

== Family ==
He married the daughter of Rev Matthew Selkrig (1643-1729), minister of Crichton, Midlothian.
