= California State University, Long Beach =

Public university in Long Beach, California, US

- Former names: Los Angeles-Orange County State College (1949–50); Long Beach State College (1950–1964); California State College, [at] Long Beach (1964–1972)
- Motto: Latin: Vox, Veritas, Vita
- Motto in English: "Voice, Truth, Life"
- Type: Public research university
- Established: 1949; 77 years ago
- Parent institution: California State University
- Accreditation: WSCUC
- Academic affiliations: ASAIHL; USU; Space-grant
- Endowment: $216.6 million (2024-25)
- Budget: $581.1 million (2024-25)
- President: Loren J. Blanchard
- Provost: Karyn Scissum Gunn
- Faculty: 2,539 (fall 2025)
- Students: 42,174 (fall 2025)
- Undergraduates: 36,703 (fall 2025)
- Postgraduates: 5,471 (fall 2025)
- Location: Long Beach, California, United States; 33.783022°N 118.112858°W
- Campus: 323 acres (131 ha); Large city
- Newspaper: Long Beach Current
- Colors: Black and gold
- Nicknames: Beach; Dirtbags
- Sporting affiliations: NCAA Division I – Big West; MPSF; GCC
- Mascot: Elbee
- Website: csulb.edu

California State University, Long Beach (Cal State Long Beach or CSULB), also known in athletics as Long Beach State University (LBSU), is a public research university in Long Beach, California, United States. The 322-acre (130 ha) campus is the second largest in the California State University system (CSU).

The university enrolls around 35,843 undergraduate students and 5,346 graduate students as of fall 2024. The graduate programs include master's degrees, credentials, post-baccalaureate certificates, and doctoral programs. CSULB is classified as an "R2: Doctoral Universities – High Research Activity". The university offers five doctoral programs: Educational Leadership- Community College Higher Ed Specialization or P-12 Specialization (Ed.D.), Engineering and Computational Mathematics (Ph.D.), Physical Therapy (DPT), Public Health (DR.P.H.) and Nursing Practice (DNP).

The university is home to one of the largest publicly funded art schools in the United States. The university is a Hispanic-serving institution (HSI) and is eligible to be designated as an Asian American Native American Pacific Islander serving institution (AANAPISI).

== History ==
The original location of Los Angeles-Orange County State College.

The college was established in 1949 by California governor Earl Warren, to serve the rapidly expanding post-World War II population of Orange and Southern Los Angeles counties. The institution was first named the Los Angeles-Orange County State College, with Peter Victor Peterson as its first president.

Carl W. McIntosh was named the college's second president in 1959. While McIntosh was president, the school's enrollment surged from about 10,000 to over 30,000, and he rapidly expanded and revamped the curriculum. McIntosh tripled the number of faculty and constructed 30 new campus buildings. Although the 1960s were a period of deep unrest on American college campuses, McIntosh's collegial governing style, gentle public demeanor, and willingness to permit peaceful protest on campus helped preserve Long Beach State College's relatively serene social climate. In 1964, the school changed its name to California State College at Long Beach. In 1967, the California state legislature revamped the state college system. As part of these changes, the university was renamed California State College, Long Beach in 1968 and became closely integrated into the California State College system.

In 1965, CSULB hosted the first International Sculpture Symposium to be held both at a higher education institution and in the United States. Six international and two American sculptors many of the on-campus installations. The event received national media attention from major newspapers, including The New York Times and the Los Angeles Times Magazine.

McIntosh departed for Montana State University in 1969, and was succeeded by President Steve Horn. The California State University Board of Trustees elevated the school to university status in 1972, along with 12 other state college campuses, based on total enrollment, size of graduate programs, complexity and diversity of majors and number of doctorates held by faculty at each college. Later that year, the campus opened the largest library facility in the then 19-campus CSU system: a modern six-story building with a seating capacity of nearly 4,000 students.

In 1995, President Robert Maxson initiated the privately funded President's Scholars Program, providing selected qualified California high school valedictorians and National Merit finalists and semi-finalists with a full four-year scholarship package, including tuition, a book stipend, and housing. As of May 2010, over 1000 students have accepted the scholarship. For applicants for fall 2010, National Achievement Program Semifinalists/Finalists and National Hispanic Recognition scholars were also considered.

In August 2020, CSULB unveiled its new shark mascot, Elbee, following a 2019 student-led process that selected the shark as Beach's new mascot. While Elbee is a shark, the university's Division I intercollegiate athletics program remains "Beach Athletics". As of 2022, the university was classified among "R2: Doctoral Universities – High research activity" in recognition of the university's evolution from a master's-level comprehensive institution to one that awards doctorates and conducts a significant amount of research.

== Campus ==
The campus spans 323 acres (131 ha) across 84 buildings, and is located 3 miles (5 km) from the Pacific Ocean. CSULB is located at 1250 Bellflower Boulevard. It is bounded by East 7th Street to the south, East Atherton Street to the north, Bellflower Boulevard to the west, and Palo Verde Avenue to the east.

=== Architecture ===
The architecture of the campus is mainly of the International style (designed primarily by architect Edward Killingsworth). It is minimalist. It has earned design awards and awards from gardening societies. The integration of landscaping and architecture is apparent at the school's theater complex, where a dense grove of ficus trees is planted in such a way that it forms a continuation of the pillar-supported canopy at the theater's entrance. The university's registration offices are located in the open courtyard of Brotman Hall, which is "roofed" by a similar jungle-like canopy.

=== Campus landmarks ===
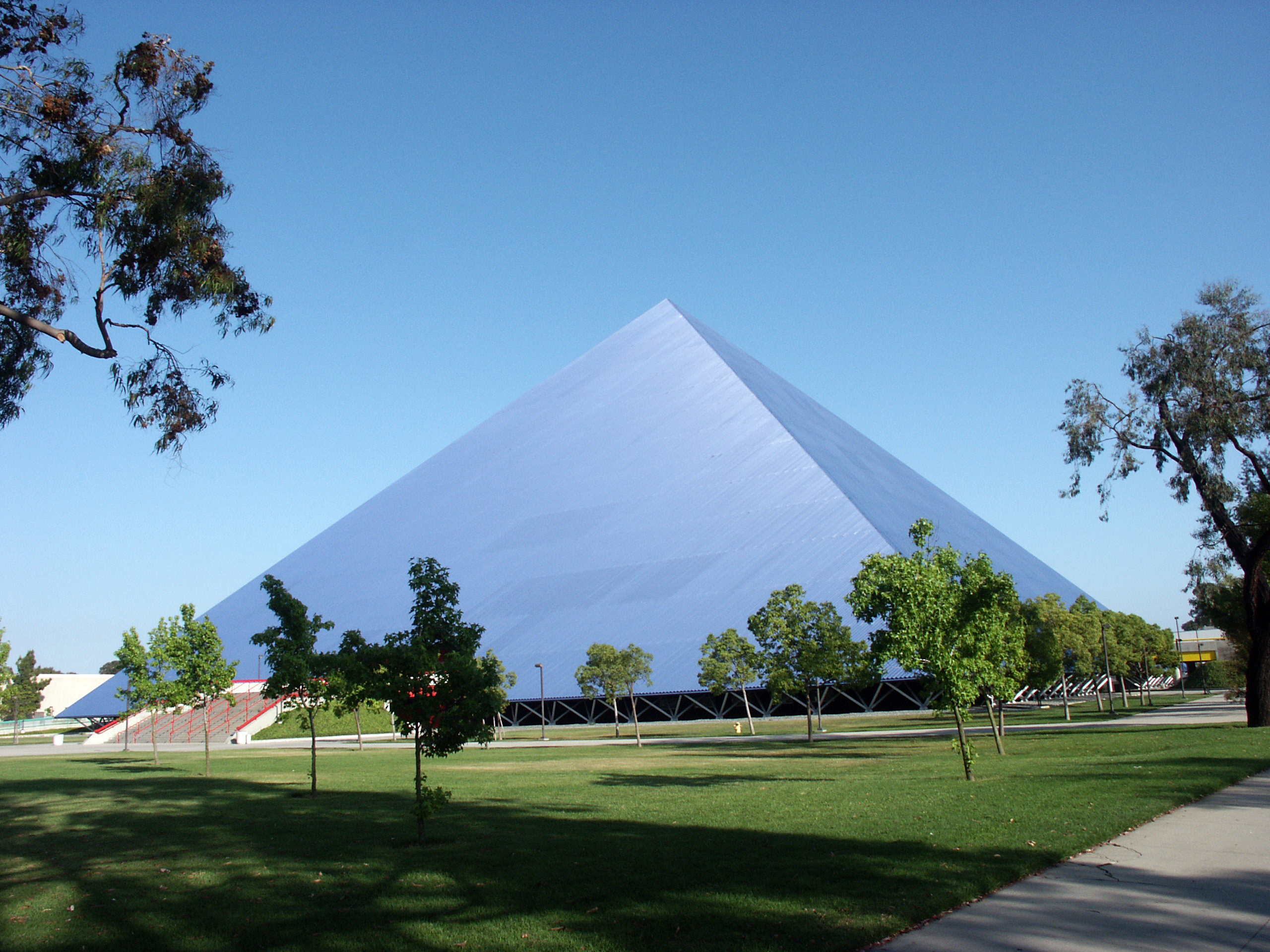
The LBS Financial Credit Union Pyramid, the university's most prominent sporting complex and most recognizable landmark.

The University Student Union (USU) building is located at the center of campus. The three-story glass building occupies roughly 180,000 square feet (17,000 m^{2}), housing numerous offices, and offering more casual attractions, including a study lounge, a ballroom, a food court, a bowling alley, an arcade, and a movie theater. As of Fall 2025, the USU is undergoing major renovations as part of the largest and most costly building project in CSU history.

The Rec and Wellness Center is an extensive all-purpose athletic center covering about 125,000 square feet (11,600 m^{2}) on North Campus. It was completed in 2010. It includes facilities for fitness programs and aerobics classes, courts for volleyball, basketball, badminton, rock climbing walls, an indoor track, a student lounge, and much more. The center is funded and managed by CSULB's Associated Students, Incorporated (ASI).

Beach basketball and volleyball games are played in the iconic, eighteen-story LBS Financial Credit Union Credit Union Pyramid (formerly known as the Walter Pyramid and the Long Beach Pyramid) located on north campus. The Pyramid is a sporting complex that can accommodate over 5,000 fans, including temporary seating and standing room. Two sections of interior stands are fitted with large hydraulic lifts that can lift the seating elements 45 degrees into the air, creating room for five volleyball courts or three basketball courts. The Pyramid is home to the Southern California Summer Pro League, a noted showcase for current and prospective NBA basketball players.

The University Art Museum's permanent collection contains primarily abstract expressionist paintings, works on paper, and an outdoor sculpture garden that began in 1966. The UAM was the first accredited museum in the CSU system. In addition, the museum's Gordon F. Hampton collection is housed at the Downtown Los Angeles law offices of Sheppard Mullin.

The campus is also home to the Carpenter Performing Arts Center, a 1,074-seat theater named after CSULB alumni Richard and Karen Carpenter.

The Earl Burns Miller Japanese Garden is an artistic retreat of solitude and beauty. Among its many picturesque attractions, the Garden features a large pond populated with koi.

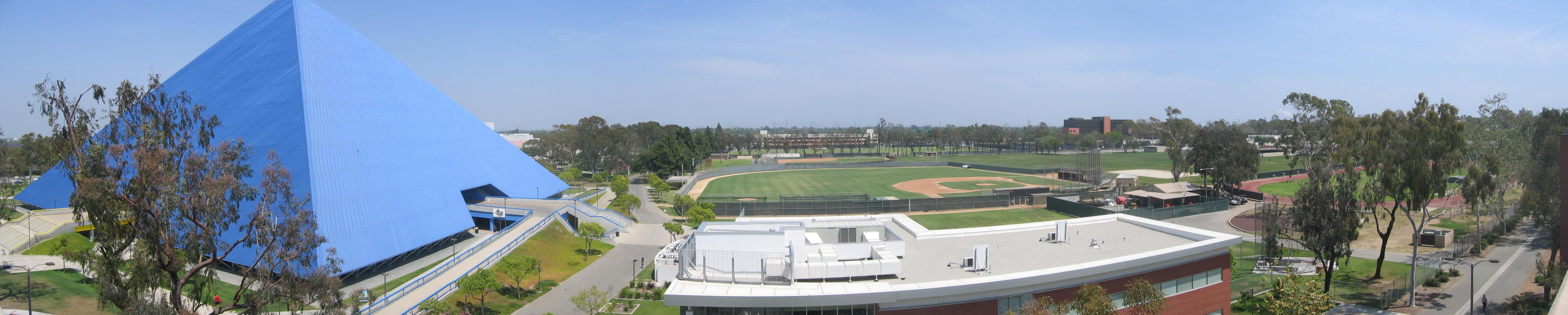
Panoramic view of the campus's sports fields, prior to the construction of the SRWC.

=== Puvungna ===
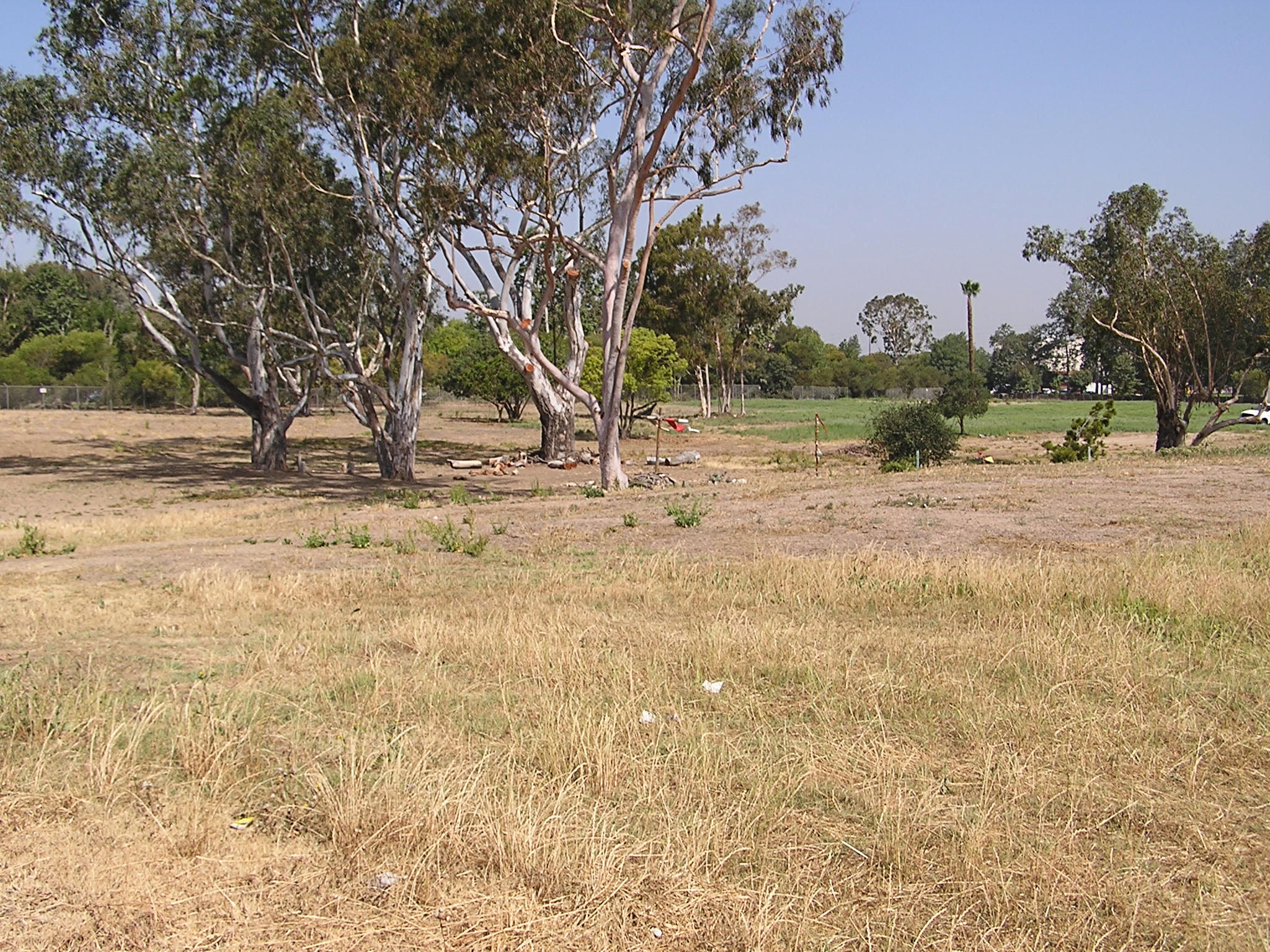
Puvunga is listed on the National Register of Historic Places.

The campus is built on the ancient Tongva village and burial site known as Puvungna ("the place of the gathering" or "in the ball"), which is a sacred site for the Tongva and Acjachemen. In 1974, the now twenty-two acre site was added to the National Register of Historic Places after the site was uncovered in the development of the nearby Japanese Garden.

From 1992 to 1995, CSULB attempted to challenge this designation in order to commercially develop the site into a strip mall and student housing. The Tongva people filed a lawsuit and initiated a protest, which involved physically occupying the land day and night to stave off bulldozers even while threatened with arrest by campus officials.

In 2019, the university dumped dirt and debris onto the site and drove heavy equipment over the ground in the construction of a new student housing development. This was received negatively by the Tongva and Acjachemen, who organized in an attempt to preserve the site from future damage. The site remains a natural area with a few trees.

=== Campus sustainability ===
The university, in its push to support climate sustainability, installed solar panels on the Brotman Hall building and the Facilities Management canopy parking in 2007.

The Environmental Science & Policy Club (ES&P Club) has brought support to environmental awareness and sustainability through club activities, such as coastal clean-ups, hikes, plant-restoration project, tabling, conferences, guest speakers, & Kaleidoscope. In 2006, the ES&P Club supported the installation of waterless urinals in the university's men's restrooms. The ES&P Club hosts an annual Earth Week celebration each April, including documentary screenings, discussions, and speaker series.

In addition, there has been a push in recent years to revive the organic gardens on campus, culminating in 2015 with the launch of the Grow Beach University Gardens, a student-led ASI sub-group that promotes organic gardening and sustainable agriculture on campus. The new garden boxes are part of a campus-wide effort to provide a natural, organic, and convenient garden right on campus for student and faculty use.

The university "has a comprehensive energy management program incorporating real-time metering and energy-saving technologies such as the EnergySaver, which provides a more sophisticated alternative to turning off the lights by automatically varying the voltage to the ballasted fixtures and reducing the power consumed, while maintaining appropriate lighting levels."

=== Desert Studies Center ===
The Desert Studies Center is a field station of the California State University located in Zzyzx, California in the Mojave Desert. The purpose of the center is to provide opportunities to conduct research, receive instruction and experience the Mojave Desert environment. It is operated by the California Desert Studies Consortium, a consortium of 7 CSU campuses: Fullerton, Cal Poly Pomona, Long Beach, San Bernardino, Northridge, Dominguez Hills and Los Angeles.

== Academics ==
E. James Brotman Hall, the university's administrative headquarters on campus.

CSULB comprises three Liberal Arts colleges:

- College of the Arts
- College of Liberal Arts
- College of Natural Sciences and Mathematics

and five vocational colleges:

- College of Business
- College of Education
- College of Engineering
- College of Health & Human Services
- College of Continuing & Professional Education

Together, the colleges offer a total of 99 baccalaureate degrees, 103 master's degrees, 44 education-related credential programs, and five doctoral degrees, as well as 17 post-baccalaureate certificates.

=== Admissions ===
Undergraduate admission statistics
	Fall 2025	Fall 2024	Fall 2023	Fall 2022	Fall 2021
First-time Freshmen
Applicants	88,301	83,971	79,681	74,741	67,122
Admits	40,105	38,854	37,547	29,851	31,448
Admit rate	45%	46%	47%	40%	47%
Enrolled	5,941	6,537	5,802	5,409	4,906
Yield rate	15%	17%	15%	18%	16%
Transfers
Applicants	26,876	26,784	25,897	26,881	33,775
Admits	13,459	14,106	13,728	12,556	12,980
Admit rate	50%	53%	53%	47%	38%
Enrolled	4,647	4,602	4,440	3,968	4,501
Yield rate	35%	33%	32%	32%	35%

California State University, Long Beach is amongst the most applied to campuses in the California State University system, receiving over 80,000 applicants with an average acceptance rate of 45%. In the Fall 2024 cohort, California State University, Long Beach saw over 83,000 applications from first-time freshmen, while more than 38,000 were granted admission. The average GPA of the admitted students was 3.93.

For masters and doctoral programs in the Fall 2023 cohort, the school received over 10,733 applications, while 3,270 applicants were granted admission. The admit yield was 56%.

=== Rankings ===
Top 10 foreign countries in headcount (Fall 2025)
Country	Headcount
India	331
Vietnam	194
Japan	103
China	51
South Korea	51
Myanmar	35
Brazil	28
Canada	26
Cambodia	25
Germany	24

Area of Residence: Foreign Country % of Total Students Students India 26.8669% 331 Vietnam 15.7468% 194 Japan 8.3604% 103 Peoples Rep of China 4.1396% 51 South Korea 4.1396% 51 Myanmar (Burma) 2.8409% 35 Brazil 2.2727% 28 Canada 2.1104% 26 Cambodia 2.0292% 25 Democ & Fed Rep Germany 1.9481% 24 In 2021, CSULB ranked No. 2 in Washington Monthly's College Guide and Rankings of master's-level universities. However, it has since fallen out of the rankings. By 2024, CSULB did not appear in the top 100.

In 2021, The Wall Street Journal/Times Higher Education ranked CSULB 8th in the nation for Campus Diversity. The category ranking, called "environment" by the publication, assessed the percentage of Pell Grant recipients, the racial and ethnic diversity of students and faculty, and the proportion of students who come from outside the United States.

Academic rankings

National
- Forbes: 89
- U.S. News & World Report: 109 (tie)
- Washington Monthly: 44
- WSJ/College Pulse: 299

Global
- QS: 1201–1400
- THE: 1001
- U.S. News & World Report: 1790 (tie)

2024-2025 USNWR Rankings
Top Performers on Social Mobility	3
Top Public Schools	52
Best Value Schools	129
Nursing	149
Economics	255
Best Undergraduate Engineering Programs	23

2024-2025USNWR departmental rankings
Social Work	60
Health Care Management	62
Physical Therapy	93
Fine Arts	99
Public health	116
Best Business Schools	123–133
Speech–Language Pathology	140
Public Affairs	144
Part-Time MBA	199

== Student life ==
Undergraduate demographics as of Fall 2023
Race and ethnicity	Total
Hispanic	50%
Asian	22%
White	15%
Black	4%
Two or more races (Note: Other consists of Multiracial Americans & those who prefer to not say.)	4%
Foreign national	2%
Unknown	2%
Economic diversity
Low-income (Note: The percentage of students who received an income-based federal Pell grant intended for low-income students.)	50%
Affluent (Note: The percentage of students who are a part of the American middle class at the bare minimum.)	50%

=== Campus publications ===
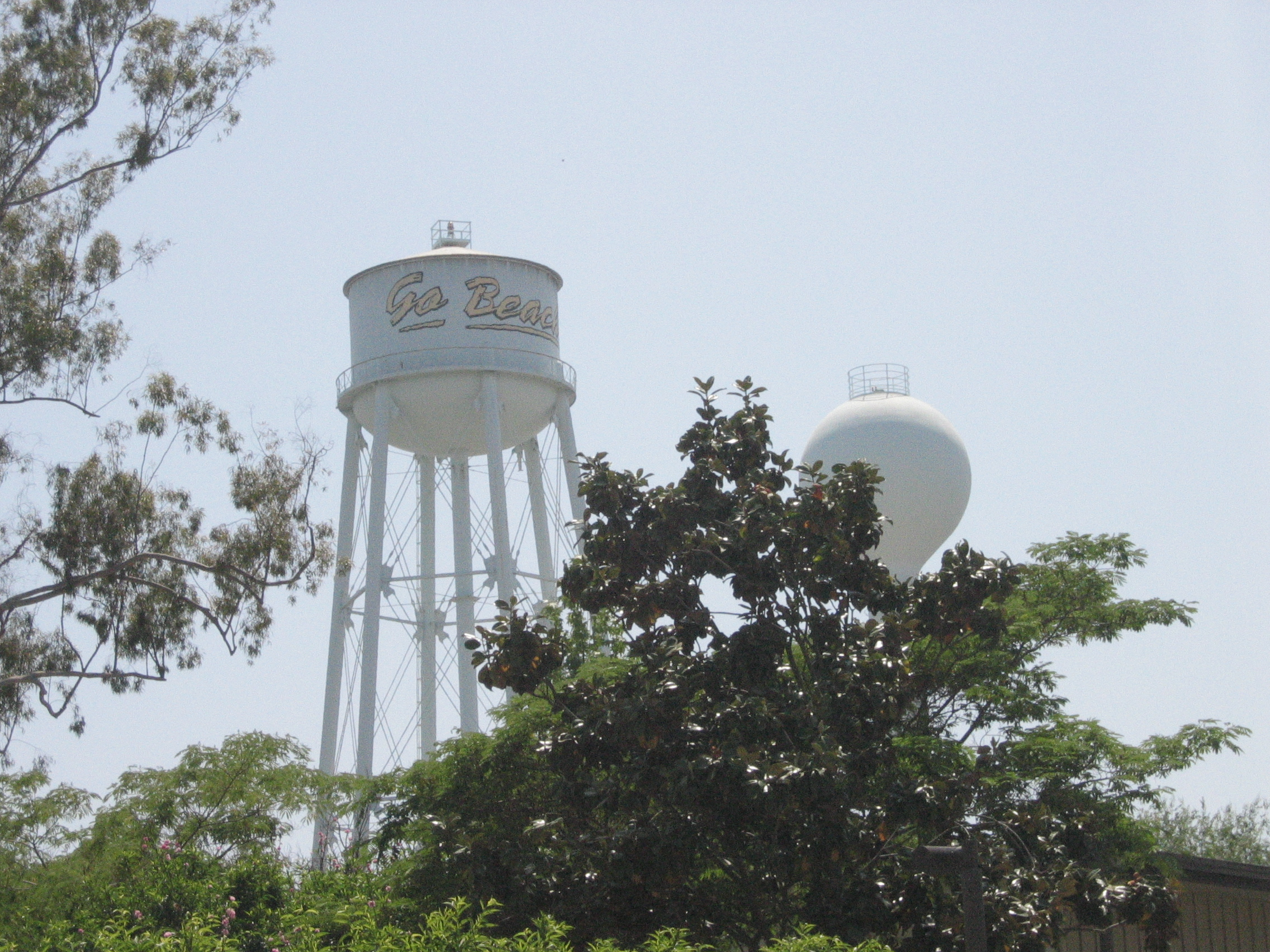
The "Go Beach!" water tower.

The university has three student publications: the Long Beach Current (until 2024 known as the Daily Forty-Niner), 22 West Magazine (formerly The Long Beach Union Newspaper) and DIG Magazine.

The first issue of the campus newspaper was published on November 11, 1949, as "The Forty-Niner." The newspaper was renamed on September 3, 1975, as the Daily Forty-Niner, and then rebranded to Long Beach Current on August 19, 2024. It publishes Monday through Thursday during the fall and spring semesters, and once weekly during the summer sessions. It was one of the first college newspapers in the country to have an Internet edition, starting in August 1994.

22 West Magazine, which is partially student-funded, and affiliated with ASI, publishes every month during fall and spring semesters. It began on April 22, 1977, when it was formed in response to the Daily 49er. The Union Weekly focuses on being an alternative voice on campus and features a satirical section called "The Grunion" (not to be confused with the Long Beach paper the Grunion Gazette). During the late 1970s through 1980s, the Union was a daily newspaper, giving heavy competition to the Daily 49er. Journalism majors who worked on the "Union" did so under a pseudonym as it was a practice forbidden by the dean of the Journalism department.

DIG Magazine, the campus magazine, has gone through many changes throughout the years. It started off as The Lantern, a magazine for night-time students, before transforming to UniverCity in 1973. Then, it turned into University Magazine. In the early 2000s, the magazine transformed to DIG Magazine as a music magazine before transitioning to a general art & culture magazine. Today, the magazine features interesting people and groups within the community, and discusses topics that concern students' interests.

=== KKJZ 88.1 FM ===
The California State University Long Beach Foundation owns the KKJZ non-commercial broadcast license of 88.1 FM, a jazz and blues radio station. Global Jazz, Inc., an affiliate of Mount Wilson FM Broadcasters, Inc., programs and manages the radio station. In 2015, Global Jazz moved the station thirty miles from Long Beach to West Los Angeles. While KKJZ began as a radio station exclusively playing Jazz and Blues music it has recently expanded its playlist to include Rhythm and Blues artists.

=== 22 West Radio ===
22 West Radio is a free format, student run internet radio station at CSU, Long Beach. It is also an HD Radio station via 88.1 HD3 as of 2013. The radio station is operated year-round. The station has been around in various forms since the mid-1970s, then known as KSUL (which went defunct after 1981). 22 West Radio is a department of Associated Students, Incorporated at CSULB and is both funded and regulated by them.

=== Student Recreation and Wellness Center ===
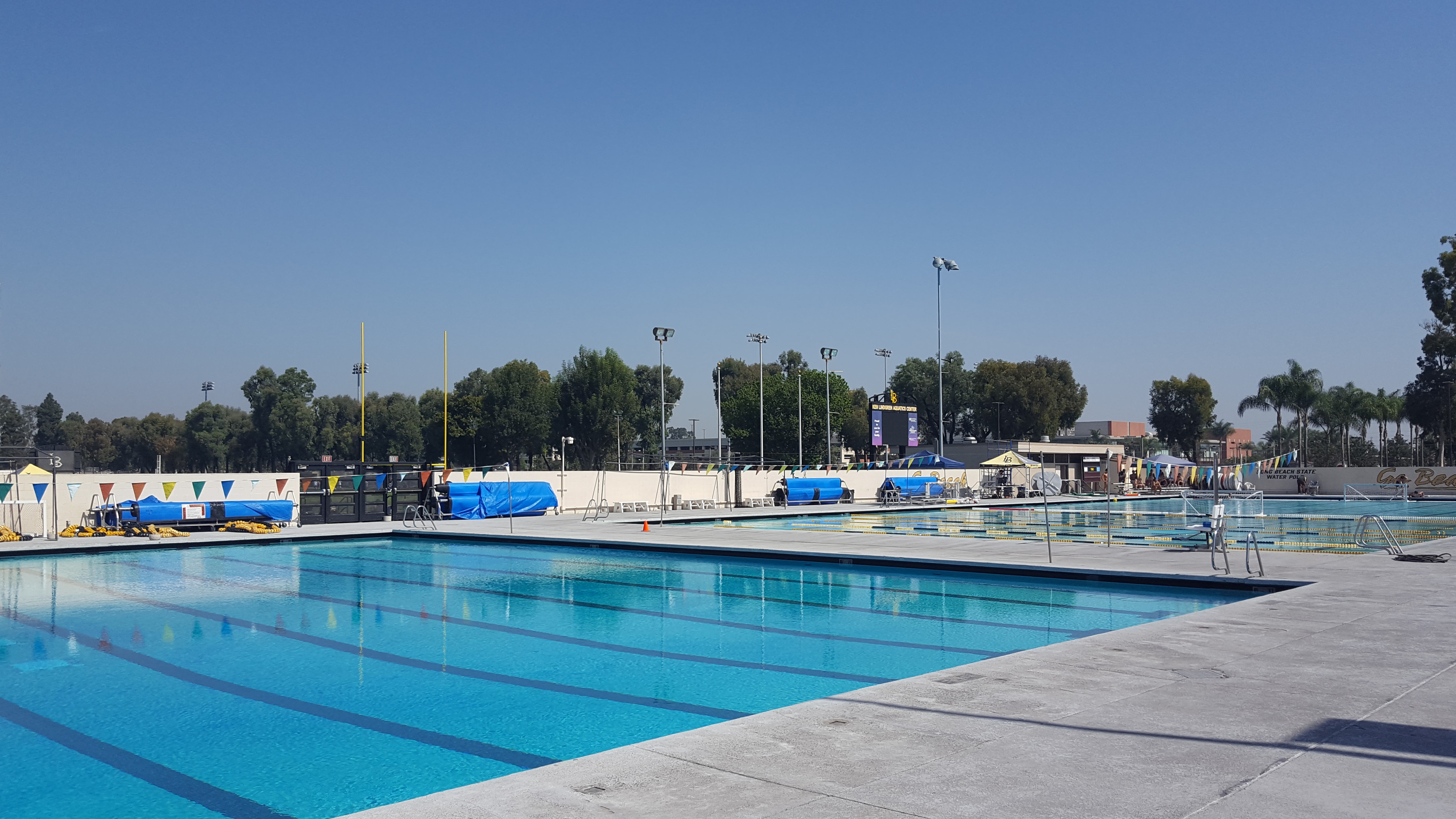
Ken Lindgren Aquatics Center

The $70 million Student Recreation and Wellness Center is located on the northeast side of campus. It opened in fall 2010.

=== Greek life – sororities and fraternities ===
There are several national sororities and fraternities on campus. Sigma Chi's expulsion in 2018 caused controversy within the student body.

== Athletics ==
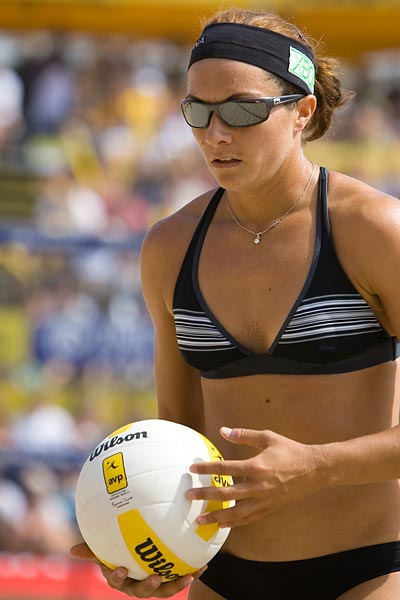
Misty May-Treanor, alumna

Long Beach State competes in NCAA Division I in 18 sports teams and plays competitively in baseball, cross country, softball, track and field, women's tennis, and women's soccer, as well as both men's and women's basketball, volleyball, water polo and golf teams. The university is a founding member of the Big West Conference, and also competes in the Mountain Pacific Sports Federation for sports not sponsored by the Big West.

In the realm of sports the school is branded as "Long Beach State". "Beach", which had long been unofficially used to refer to Long Beach State and its sports teams as it is the only university on the West Coast with the word "Beach" in its name, became the official athletic program brand name in the 2020–21 school year. One can see the cheer "Go Beach!" written on many CSULB products around campus and on the large water tower near the entrance to the campus.

The school colors have been black and gold since 2000, when they were changed by a student referendum (after George Allen changed the football uniform colors) from the original brown and gold.

Long Beach State is home to one of the top women's volleyball teams in the nation. Long Beach State has won three national titles in women's volleyball, in 1989, 1993 and 1998. The 1998 women's team was the first team in NCAA Division I history to have an undefeated season. The men's volleyball has won four national championships in 1991, 2018, 2019 and 2025. The team's most famous alumna is Misty May-Treanor, who won three Olympic gold medals in Beach Volleyball in 2004, 2008, and 2012. Long Beach is also the only California State University to participate in the Golden Coast Conference for Men's Water polo not sponsored by the Big West Conference the Division Long Beach participates for in NCAA Division I.

Because of the proximity to California State University, Fullerton, the schools are considered rivals. The rivalry is especially heated in baseball with the Long Beach State baseball team also having a competitive college baseball program.

== Notable people ==
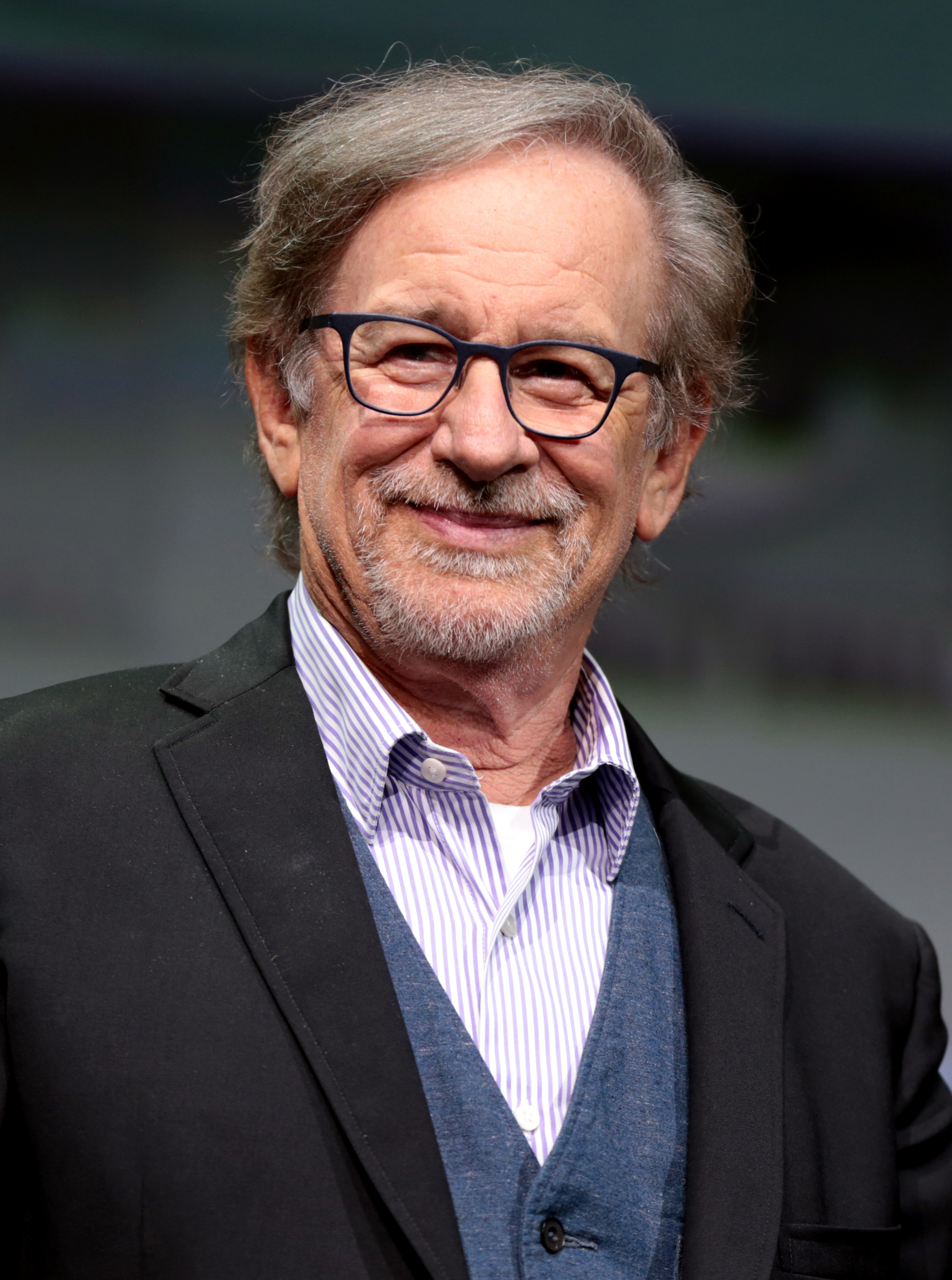
Steven Spielberg, BA 2002, Academy Award-winning film director

CSULB has more than 320,000 alumni as of 2018.

Alumni have written, acted and directed screenplays that have attracted Oscar-caliber talent. David Twohy (BA) co-wrote the screenplay for the Academy Award winning film The Fugitive. (Note: The Fugitive was nominated for seven Academy Awards, and won for Best Supporting Actor (Tommy Lee Jones).) Linda Woolverton (BA 1974) wrote the screenplays for the Academy Award-winning, (Note: The Lion King was nominated for four Academy Awards, and won for Best Original Score.) (Note: Beauty and the Beast was nominated for Best Picture and five other Academy Awards, and won for Best Original Score and Best Original Song.) Disney animated films Beauty and the Beast and The Lion King, and the live-action 2010 film Alice in Wonderland. J. F. Lawton (BA) wrote the screenplay to Pretty Woman. Mark Steven Johnson (BA 1989) has co-written and directed the films Daredevil and Ghost Rider. Actor Crispin Alapag notably on Big Time In Hollywood FL, Ray Donovan, General Hospital and VR Troopers Power Rangers.

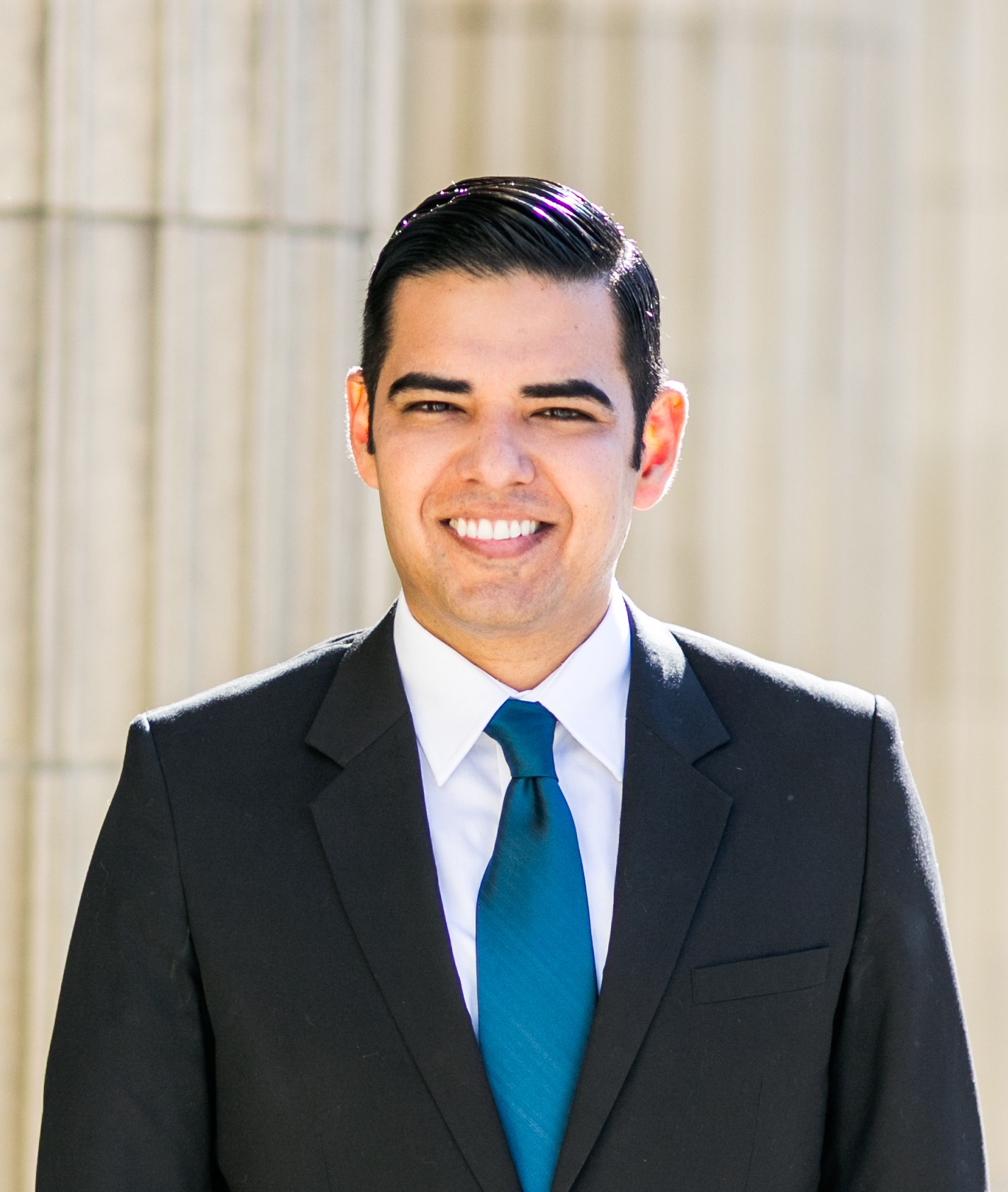
US Congressman and former mayor of Long Beach Robert Garcia

Former mayors of Long Beach Robert Garcia and Beverly O'Neill are alumni.

Former students have won at least five Academy Awards. Steven Spielberg (Class of 1969, BA 2002) won two Oscars for Best Directing for Schindler's List and Saving Private Ryan and has directed a number of other successful movies such as Jaws, E.T. the Extra-Terrestrial, and Jurassic Park. Former industrial design major John Dykstra, who has been nominated five times for Academy Awards, won two Oscars for his special effects work on the George Lucas film Star Wars and the Sam Raimi film Spider-Man 2. Deborah L. Scott (BA) won an Oscar for costume design for the James Cameron film Titanic.

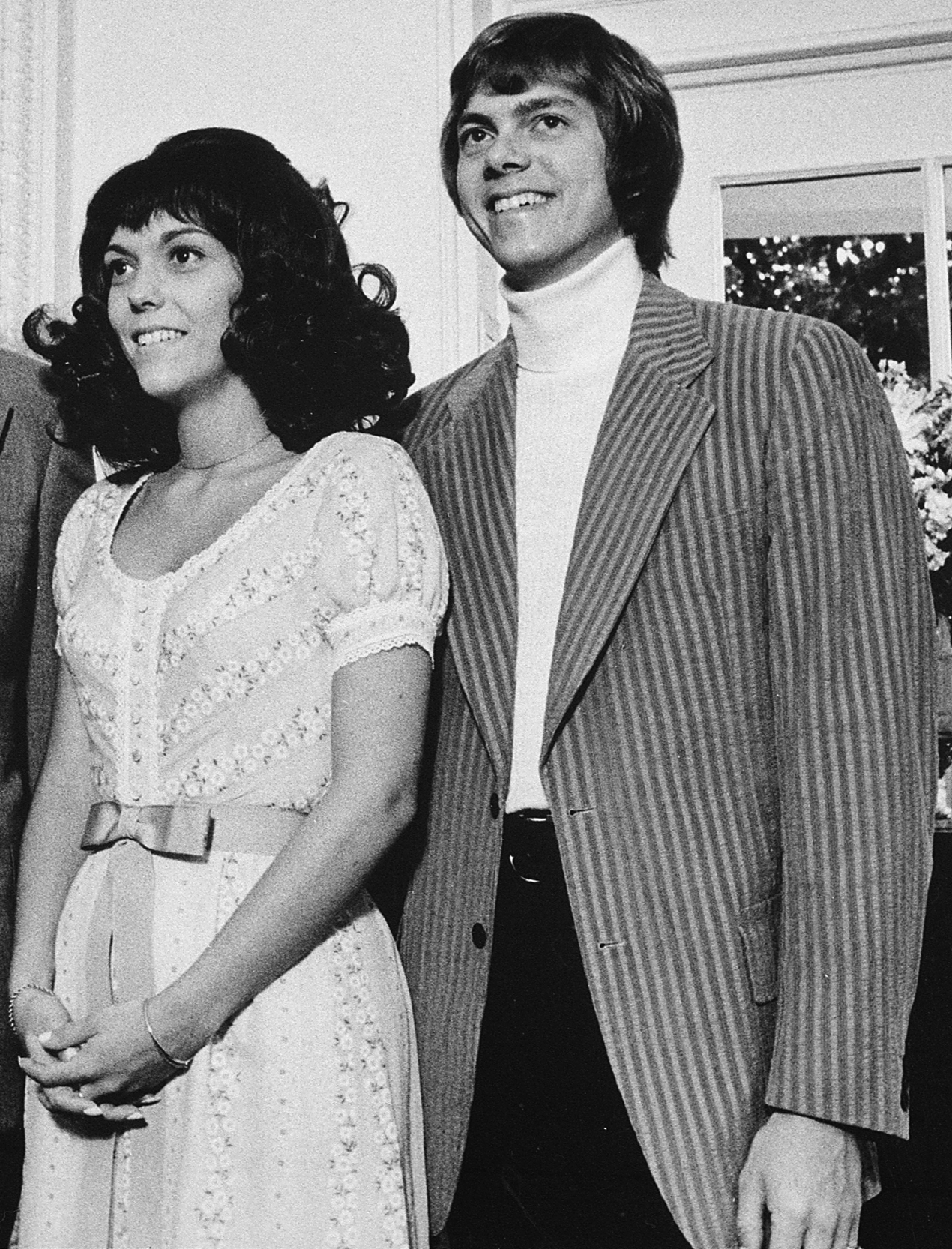
Former students Karen Carpenter and Richard Carpenter (Honorary Doctorate, 2000) of The Carpenters

Emmy Award-nominated director Chris Carter (BA 1979) created the series The X-Files, which garnered several awards during its nine seasons on television. Former student Steve Martin, whose philosophy classes at the university inspired him to become a professional comedian, is an Emmy Award winner and a Disney Legend.

Alumni and former students have also participated in the world of sports. Jason Giambi, Evan Longoria, Troy Tulowitzki, Harold Reynolds, Jered Weaver, Steve Trachsel, and Jason Vargas have all been selected to play in the Major League Baseball All Stars games. Matt Duffy won the World Series with the 2014 San Francisco Giants and continues to play with the Los Angeles Angels. Jeff McNeil of the New York Mets won the 2022 NL batting title with an average of .326. Golfer Mark O'Meara (BA 1980) won the Masters Tournament and The Open Championship. Craig Hodges is a two-time NBA Champion, Terrell Davis is a two-time Super Bowl champion and Pro Football Hall of Fame inductee, and Billy Parks played five seasons in the NFL. Diver Pat McCormick won four gold medals in two consecutive Olympics (Helsinki and Melbourne), and Misty May-Treanor (BS 2002) won three gold medals in women's beach volleyball in three other consecutive Olympics (Athens, Beijing, and London). High Jumper Dwight Stones set the World Record while a student at Cal State Long Beach, in addition to winning the bronze medal at both the 1972 Olympic Games in Munich and 1976 in Montreal. Track and Field athlete Bill Green (BA 1984) set the United States and NCAA record three times in the hammer throw, and placed 5th at the 1984 Olympic Games in Los Angeles.

Former students Karen Carpenter and Richard Carpenter (Class of 1972, Honorary Doctorate 2000) of the Carpenters are the namesakes of the Carpenter Performing Arts Center, a 1,065-seat performance hall on the campus of the university that also houses an exhibit on the Carpenters. Richard Carpenter's college instructor and choir director Frank Pooler inspired him in choral arrangement, and both Karen and Richard participated in Pooler's choir. Pooler also introduced Richard to fellow undergraduate and future song-writing collaborator John Bettis. Another undergraduate, Wesley Jacobs, would join the Carpenters as a musical instrumentalist. The Carpenters sold over 100 million records, won three Grammy Awards out of eighteen nominations, and created numerous gold and platinum albums.
