= James Bannatine =

Scottish minister

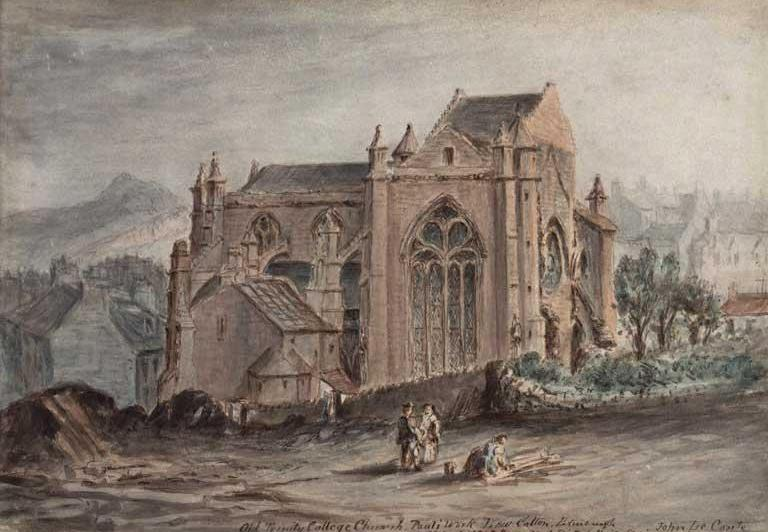
Trinity College Church in Edinburgh

James Bannantine or Bannantyne (c.1675–1756) was a Scottish minister of the Church of Scotland who served as Moderator of the General Assembly in 1739.

== Life ==
He studied divinity at the University of Edinburgh. He worked as a private tutor to the family of Robert Dundas, Lord Arniston and taught Robert Dundas, of Arniston, the elder around 1695 to 1700.

He was licensed to preach in the Church of Scotland by the Presbytery of Dalkeith in 1703 and was ordained as minister of Whittingehame Church in 1707. In 1714 he translated to the highly prestigious Trinity College Church in Edinburgh.

In 1739 he was elected Moderator of the General Assembly - the highest position in the Church of Scotland. He was succeeded by Rev George Logan in 1740.

He died in Edinburgh on 10 April 1756.

== Family ==
In 1708 he married Katherine Blair, daughter of Hugh Blair, Dean of Guild in Edinburgh. Their son Hugh Bannatine become minister of Dirleton and their son George Bannantine was minister of the Wynd Church in Glasgow. Their daughter Elizabeth married Andrew Shaw, minister of St Madoes and their daughter Katherine married Hugh Blair, minister of St Giles Cathedral in Edinburgh. Little is known of their daughter Grizel Bannantine.

== Publications ==
- An Essay on Gospel and Legal Preaching (1723)
- Mistakes About Religion (1737)
- Peace and Truth (1738)
