= Scottish Sculpture Open =

Coordinates: 57.235°N 2.905°W

The Scottish Sculpture Open exhibition, sometimes known as the Kildrummy Open, was organised by the Scottish Sculpture Workshop from 1981 to 1997. The idea was initiated by Fred Bushe (1931–2009), the Founder Director of the Scottish Sculpture Workshop. The exhibition consisted of works drawn from an open call and sometimes included works by invited artists. It was installed at Kildrummy Castle and some editions of the exhibition toured to other venues.

== Participating artists ==
Scottish Sculpture Open	Date	Artists	Venues	Reviews
1	4 July – 5 September 1981	Barry Atherton, Syd Burnett, Fred Bushe, Doug Cocker, Michael Hall, John Gavin McCallum, Iain McIntosh, James B Munro, Barbara Douglas Peffers, Frank Pottinger, Bill Scott, Andy Stenhouse, Arthur Watson, George Wyllie, J Ian Young	Kildrummy Castle	
2	2 July – 17 September 1983	G Noel Bullock, Fred Bushe, Doug Cocker, James Connell, Carole Gray, Moira Innes, Frances Pelly, Frank Pottinger, Andy Stenhouse, Arthur Watson, Ian Young	Kildrummy Castle	
3	1985	William Brotherston, Fred Bushe, Doug Cocker, Stephen Collingbourne, Paul Cosgrove, Fiona Dean, Celia Garbutt, Carole Gray, Olaf Hanel, Hironori Katagiri, Aileen Keith, Rona McNicol, Peter Reeve, Andy Stenhouse. Invited artists: Hilary Cartmel, Lee Grandjean, Stuart White	Kildrummy Castle	
4	4 July – 20 September 1987	Michael Archer, Clifford Rhys Bowen, Jim Buckley, Paul Cosgrove, Fiona Dean, Sybille Von Halem, Raha Lavasaney, Eileen MacDonagh, Andrew Miller, Frank Pottinger, Keith Rand, Peter Reeve, Bill Scott. Invited artists: Fred Conlon, Bradford Graves, Yoshio Yagi	Kildrummy Castle	
5	1 July – 24 September 1989	Jeremy Cunningham, Graham Fagen, Tracy McKenna, Frances Pelly. Symposium Artists: Perusko Bogdanic, Guilliame De La Chapelle, Anne Nicholson, Ole Sjovold. Invited Artists: Brian McCann	Kildrummy Castle	
6	6 July – 15 September 1991	Chris Bailey, Peter Bevan, Mark Clifford, Gary Clough, Jeremy Cunningham, Jake Harvey, Ailsa Magnus, Hamish Marr, Richard Miller, Ken Mitchell, Nigel Mullan, Rona McNicol, Keiji Nagahiro, Sarah Nevill, Frank Pottinger, Jim Ritchie	Kildrummy Castle and Strathdon	
7	12 June – 1 August 1993	Anne Bevan, Peter Bevan, Fred Bushe, Sybille von Halem, John Hunter, Joseph Ingleby, Mary Modeen, Rob Mulholland, Gordon Munro, Sarah Nevill, Frances Pelly, Arran Ross, Marion Smith, Stephen Smith, Sean Taylor. Invited artists: Doug Cocker, Frank Pottinger, Arthur Watson	Kildrummy Castle	Herald, 17 September 1993
8	1995	Peter Bevan, William Brotherston, Angela Conner, Richard Cole, Joseph Ingleby, Iain McColl, Diane Maclean, Charles Poulsen, Keith Rand, Laura White. Invited artists: Horace L Farlowe, Bjorn Fjellstrom, Kenichi Mashita, Agneta Stening.	Kildrummy Castle, Toured to MacRobert Arts Centre, Stirling	Herald, 9 August 1995 Herald, 2 October 1995
9	1997	Kevin Blackwell, Mary Bourne, Doug Cocker, Richard Cole, Fly Freeman, Sam MacDonald, Diane Maclean, Mary Modeen, Keiji Nagahiro, Alison Simpson, Allan Watson, Arthur Watson, Aeneas Wilder. Curator: Duncan Macmillan	Kildrummy Castle; MacRobert Arts Centre, Stirling; Argyll and Bute Countryside Trust, Argyll; Strathclyde Country Park, North Lanarkshire	Herald, 29 October 1997, Photo Herald, 26 February 1998, Photo

== Publications ==
- Scottish Sculpture Open, poster, Scottish Sculpture Workshop, 1981
- Scottish Sculpture Open 3, Scottish Sculpture Workshop, 1985
- Scottish Sculpture Open 5, Scottish Sculpture Workshop, 1989
- Scottish Sculpture Open 7, Scottish Sculpture Workshop, 1993
- Scottish Sculpture Open 8, Scottish Sculpture Workshop, 1995
- Scottish Sculpture Open 9, Scottish Sculpture Workshop, 1997
