= Peter Halkerston =

Scottish lawyer and author

Peter Halkerston LLD SSC
- Died: c. 1833
- Occupations: Lawyer, Librarian
- Writing career
- Subjects: Law, Holyrood Abbey
- Notable works: A Treatise on the History, Law, and Privilege's of the Palace and Sanctuary of Holyrood House

Peter Halkerston (d. 1833?) was a Scottish lawyer and writer who became an authority on the Holyrood Abbey in Edinburgh.

Halkerston received a university education, graduating with an MA degree. He studied law, and became a member of the Society of Solicitors in the Supreme Courts of Scotland.

For 10 years, Halkerston served as an examiner for the Society and, for a longer time, as their librarian. He also held the office of bailie of the Abbey of Holyrood. In 1831, Halkerston published A Treatise on the History, Law, and Privilege's of the Palace and Sanctuary of Holyrood House.

Halkerston received the honorary degree of LL.D, and was also elected an extraordinary member of the Royal Physical Society of Edinburgh.

In the 1830s, he is listed as living in Edinburgh.

== Writings ==
His other works were:

- A Compendium or General Abridgment of the Faculty Collection of Decisions of the Lords of Council and Session from 4 February 1754 to the Session of 1817, (Edinburgh 1819–20)
- A Translation and Explanation of the Technical Terms in Mr. Erskine's Institutes of the Law of Scotland (Edinburgh 1820; 2nd edition, 1829).
- A Collection of Latin Maxims and Rules in Law and Equity, with an English translation (Edinburgh 1823)
- An Analysis of the Act of Parliament 6 Geo. IV, and the Acts of Sederunt founded thereon (Edinburgh 1827). These acts remodelled the procedure in the court of session.
- 'A Digest of the Law of Scotland relating to Marriage. Book i. (Edinburgh 1827; new edition, 1831).
