= John Halkerston =

Scottish architect

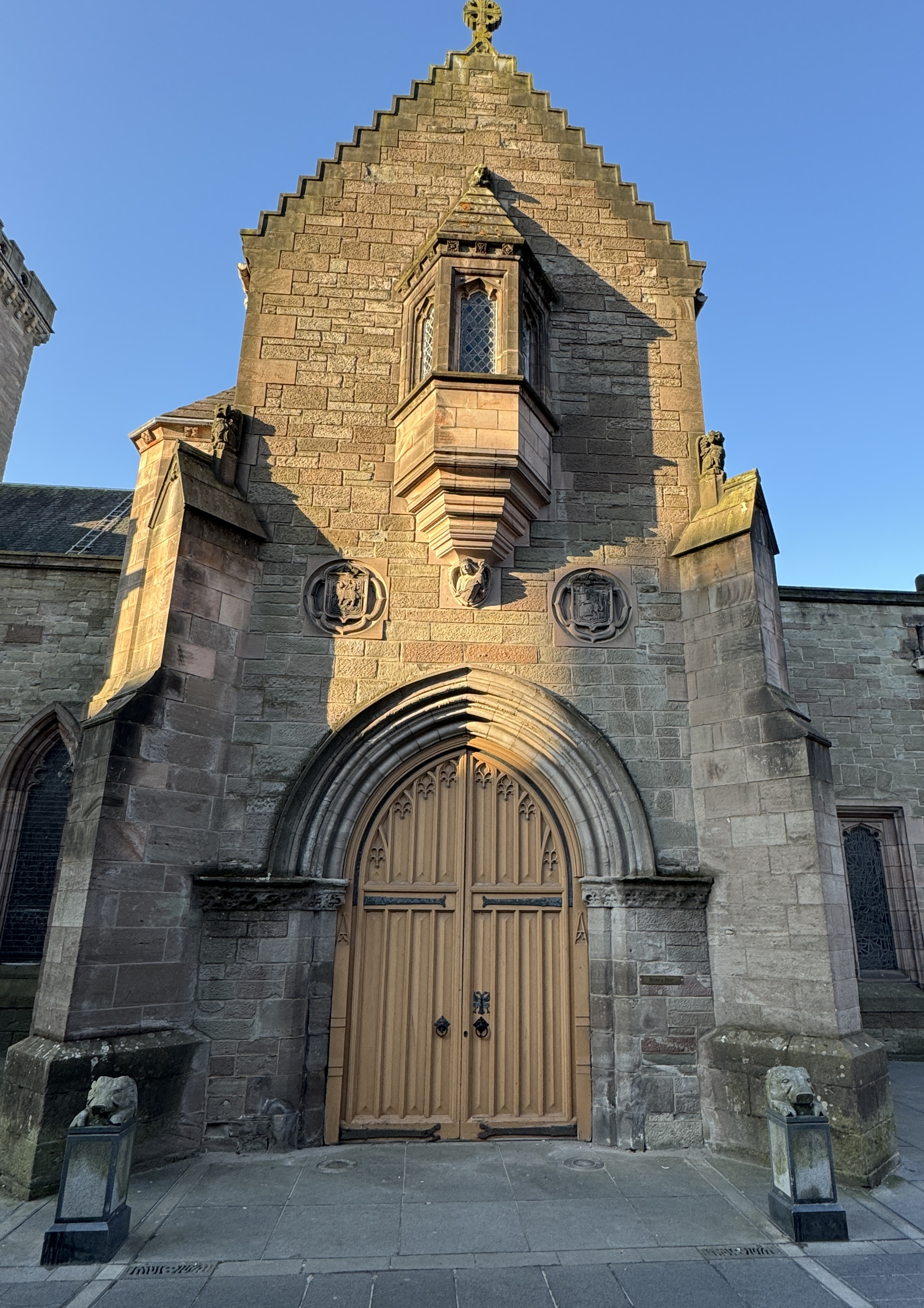
- Halkerston Tower and the "Bride's Entrance" at St John's Kirk, Perth, looking southwest
- Occupation: Architect
- Design: St John's Kirk, Perth, Scotland

John Halkerston was a Scottish architect, prominent in the 15th century. He was Master of Works at Trinity College Kirk, Edinburgh, in the 1460s. Around the same time, he worked on St John's Kirk, in Perth, the northwest porch of which is now named "Halkerston Tower" in his honour. The door of the tower is known as the "Bride's Entrance" due to its use during weddings today.

Halkerston's Wynd, a former wynd or alleyway in Edinburgh, is named for him.
