= Alan of Galloway =

Scottish Lord (before 1199–1234)

Alan son of Roland
- Lord of Galloway
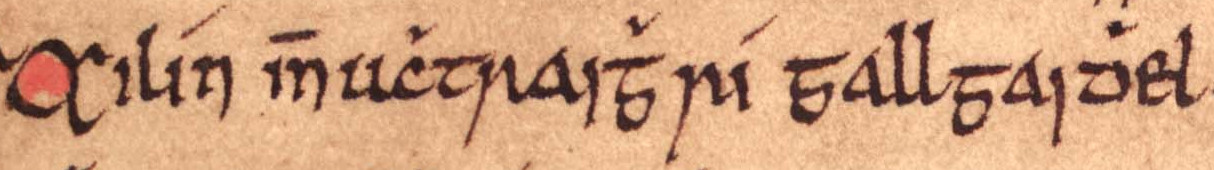
- Alan's name as it appears on folio 65r of Oxford Bodleian Library Rawlinson B 489 (the Annals of Ulster). (Note: Other than patronyms derived from their fathers, and toponyms in reference to Galloway itself, the only surname borne by members of the ruling family of Galloway were forms of the Gaelic mac Uchtraigh, accorded to Alan and his brother, by the Annals of Loch Cé, and the Annals of Ulster. The pictured excerpt is one such instance.)
- Reign: 1200–1234
- Predecessor: Roland (Lochlann) of Galloway
- Born: before 1199
- Died: 1234
- Burial: Dundrennan Abbey
- Wives: 1. (unnamed) de Lacy; 2. Margaret of Huntingdon; 3. Rose de Lacy
- Issue: unnamed; Helen; Christiana; Dervorguilla; Thomas; Thomas
- Father: Roland (Lochlann) of Galloway
- Mother: Helen de Morville

Alan of Galloway (before 1199 – 1234) was a leading thirteenth-century Scottish magnate. (Note: Since the 1990s, academics have accorded Alan various personal names in English secondary sources: Ailin, Ailín, Alan, and Allan. Likewise, Alan has been accorded the following patronyms: Alan fitz Roland, Alan fitzRonald, Alan has also been accorded various toponyms: Alan de Galloway, and Alan of Galloway.) As the hereditary Lord of Galloway and Constable of Scotland, he was one of the most influential men in the Kingdom of Scotland and Irish Sea zone.

Alan first appears in courtly circles in about 1200, about the time he inherited his father's possessions and offices. After he secured his mother's inheritance almost two decades later, Alan became one of the most powerful magnates in the Scottish realm. Alan also held lands in the Kingdom of England, and was an advisor of John, King of England concerning Magna Carta. Alan later played a considerable part in Alexander II, King of Scotland's northern English ambitions during the violent aftermath of John's rejection of Magna Carta. Alan participated in the English colonisation of Ulster, receiving a massive grant in the region from the English king, and simultaneously aided the Scottish crown against rebel claimants in the western and northern peripheries of the Scottish realm. Alan entered into a vicious inter-dynastic struggle for control of the Kingdom of the Isles, supporting one of his kinsmen against another. Alan's involvement in the Isles, a region under nominal Norwegian authority, provoked a massive military response by Hákon Hákonarson, King of Norway, causing a severe crisis for the Scottish crown.

As ruler of the semi-autonomous Lordship of Galloway, Alan was courted by the Scottish and English kings for his remarkable military might, and was noted in Norse saga-accounts as one of the greatest warriors of his time. Like other members of his family, he was a generous religious patron. Alan died in February 1234. Although under the traditional Celtic custom of Galloway, Alan's illegitimate son could have succeeded to the Lordship of Galloway, under the feudal custom of the Scottish realm, Alan's nearest heirs were his surviving daughters. Using Alan's death as an opportunity to further integrate Galloway within his realm, Alexander forced the partition of the lordship amongst Alan's daughters. Alan was the last legitimate ruler of Galloway, descending from the native dynasty of Fergus, Lord of Galloway.

== Background ==
Alan was born sometime before 1199. He was the eldest son of Lochlann of Galloway, Frenchified as Roland, and his wife, Helen de Morville. His parents were likely married before 1185, possibly at some point in the 1170s, since Roland was compelled to hand over three sons as hostages to Henry II, King of England in 1186. Roland and Helen had three sons, and two daughters. The name of one of Alan's brothers is unknown, suggesting that he died young. The other, Thomas, became Earl of Atholl by right of his wife. One of Alan's sisters, Ada, married Walter Bisset, Lord of Aboyne. The other, Dervorguilla, married Nicholas de Stuteville, Lord of Liddel.

Alan's mother was the daughter of Richard de Morville, Anglo-Norman lord of Cunninghame and Lauderdale, and sister and heir of William de Morville, Lord of Lauderdale and Cunningham, Constable of Scotland. Alan's father was the eldest son of Uhtred, Lord of Galloway, son of Fergus, Lord of Galloway. The familial origins of Fergus are unknown, and he first appears on record in 1136. The mother of at least two of his children, Uhtred and Affraic, was an unknown daughter of Henry I, King of England. It was probably not long after Fergus' emergence into recorded history that he gave away Affraic in marriage to Amlaíb mac Gofraid, King of the Isles. One after-effect of these early twelfth-century marital alliances was that Alan—Fergus' great-grandson—was a blood relative of the early thirteenth-century kings of England and the kings of the Isles—men who proved to be important players throughout Alan's career.

Simplified family tree of Alan illustrating his degree of kinship with the contemporary kings of England and the Isles.

Henry I King of England
Fergus; Lord of Galloway	unknown	Matilda
Uhtred; Lord of Galloway	Amlaíb; King of the Isles	Affraic	Henry II; King of England
Roland; Lord of Galloway	Gofraid; King of the Isles	John; King of England
Alan; Lord of Galloway	Ragnall; King of the Isles	Amlaíb Dub; King of the Isles	Henry III; King of England

== Early career ==
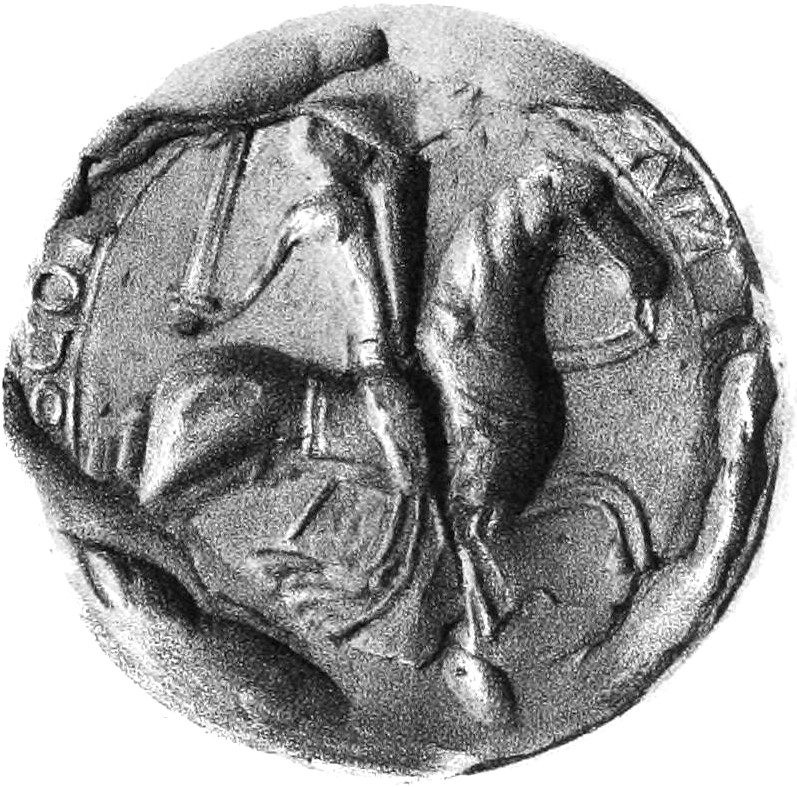
Seal of Alan's second father-in-law, David, Earl of Huntingdon. The seal depicts the armament of a twelfth-century knight.

Roland died in December 1200, after which Alan succeeded to the lordship of Galloway. Alan also inherited the constableship of Scotland, a pre-eminent position which had passed to Roland from the Morvilles by right of Roland's wife, the only surviving heir of Richard de Morville. (Note: The office had previously been held by Richard until his death in about 1189 or 1190, whereupon it passed to his son, William, who died childless in 1196. According to the thirteenth-century Gesta Annalia I, Roland had to pay the king a relief of 700 merks to succeed to William's lands and constableship.) As constable, Alan, like the earls of the realm, was responsible for leading the king's royal forces. It is uncertain whether the constable of this period took precedence over the earls in command of the king's army, or if the constable had charge of the realm's numerous marischals. His attachment to the importance of his position as constable is evidenced by the fact that this title tends to have taken priority over his hereditary title as ruler of Galloway.

Even before Roland's death, Alan was active in courtly circles, perhaps serving as his father's deputy. Alan's first known important attestation occurs late in December 1199, when he witnessed a royal charter at Forfar. From this point in his career until 1209, Alan appears to have been most often in the attendance of the Scottish king, witnessing several of the latter's royal charters. Alan's eminent standing in society is partly evidenced by the fact that, within these sources, his name tends to appear amongst the top four recorded names, and is usually the first name of non-comital rank. His second marriage, in about 1209, to the king's niece, Margaret, eldest daughter of David, Earl of Huntingdon also reveals Alan's significant social standing. From about 1210 to 1215, his activity in Scottish affairs dwindles dramatically, whilst his activity in English affairs increases steadily. (Note: It is possible that the twelfth- or thirteenth century Roman de Fergus was composed for Alan. If so, it could commemorate his marriage to Margaret.)

== Ulster ambitions ==
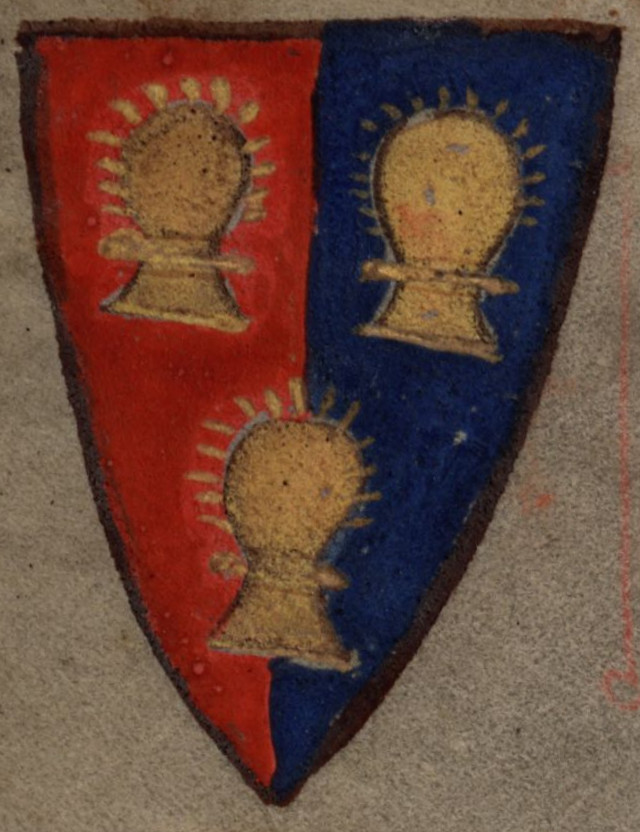
Coat of arms attributed to Alan's first father-in-law, Roger de Lacy, Constable of Chester, as it appears on folio 33r of Cambridge Corpus Christi College 16 II (Chronica majora).

At some point in the first quarter of the thirteenth century, Alan was granted a vast swathe of territory in Ulster from John, King of England. The transaction itself almost certainly took place in the aftermath of the John's expedition to Ireland in 1210. The exact date of the transaction, however, cannot be ascertained due to a gap in English charter records between the months of April 1209 and May 1212. The brunt of John's nine-week Irish campaign appears to have been directed at wayward Anglo-Norman magnates—the troublesome Lacy family in particular. With his subsequent destruction of Hugh de Lacy, Earl of Ulster, and the confiscation of the latter's Irish earldom, John was evidently in a position to reward his own supporters with the Lacys' former possessions. A date of 1210 for Alan's grant, as well as the possibility of his participation in the English expedition of the same year, may be evidenced by the record of a certain "Alan, son of Roland" in the king's service that year. (Note: This "Alan, son of Roland", however, appears to be a like-named, unrelated knight, who held lands in Berkshire and Oxfordshire, and died in 1210 or 1211.)

Other sources, however, point to 1212 as the year of Alan's grant. For instance, the thirteenth-century Gesta Annalia I states that, when the English and Scottish kings concluded their treaty at Norham in February 1212, Alan did homage for the "extensive" Irish lands that the English king had given him. The fifteenth-century historian Walter Bower echoed this statement, adding that Alan obtained a lordship of one hundred sixty knights' fees, and took an oath on William's behalf to uphold the treaty. Certain documentary sources appear to lend credibility to aforementioned accounts. Specifically, a confirmation charter from John to Alan, dating to 1215; a somewhat dubious copy of a letter from William to John, which makes reference to Alan's seal; and the copy of a letter from the Irish justiciar concerning the delivery of seisin to Alan's proxies, which appears to date to April or May 1212. In July 1213, Alan was granted right to the forests and fairs upon his Irish lands.

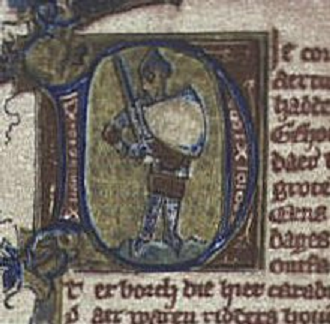
Fourteenth-century depiction of Fergus, Lord of Galloway as he is depicted in Leiden University Library Letterkunde 191 (Roman van Ferguut). Fergus was a grandfather of Donnchad mac Gilla Brigte, and a great-grandfather of Alan, his brother Thomas, and Ragnall mac Gofraid. These four descendants of Fergus were important agents of the English Crown in Ireland.

There is reason to suspect that Alan obtained William's approval in regard to his dealings with John. In 1211, Ross and Moray, the northern peripheries of the Scottish realm, were invaded by Gofraid mac Domnaill, a member of the Meic Uilleim, a kindred that contested the kingship. (Note: In fact, Alan and his brother, Thomas, were amongst the commanders of the royal Scottish forces that battled Gofraid in 1211.) Facing continued opposition early in 1212, William likely undertook the treaty negotiations at Norham as a means of retaining good relations with John, and the agreement itself was likely concluded in the context of shared security concerns. The Meic Uilleim appear to have drawn support against the Scottish crown from peripheral regions of the realm, and likely from Gaelic Ulster as well. In fact, Gofraid's invasion may well have been based from Ulster, and could have been an after-effect of John's campaign there. The most powerful native Gaelic ruler in the region during this period was Áed Méith Ua Néill, King of Tír Eoghain, a figure who appears to have not only seized upon the power vacuum created by Hugh's fall, but may have also aided the Meic Uilleim insurrection in Scotland. The successful implementation of Alan's massive grant in Ulster, therefore, would have not only served English interests in the region, but would have also dramatically increased the security of the Scottish realm. In effect, the alliance between John and Alan appears to have been a coordinated campaign constructed by the English and Scottish crowns in an effort to secure the control of outlying territories where their royal authority was disputed. (Note: In 1212, the Annals of Ulster record that Alan's brother, Thomas, and unnamed sons of Ragnall mac Somairle launched assaults upon Derry and Inishowen. Two years later, the same source records that Thomas and Ruaidrí mac Ragnaill plundered Derry. Such assaults in Ulster may have been directed at Meic Uilleim power centres.)

The territories granted to Alan encompassed most of what is today northern County Antrim and far north-eastern County Londonderry, stretching from Glenarm to Coleraine. The vast scale of Alan's allotment suggests that it was almost certainly a speculative grant, with little prospect that he could assemble the necessary men and resources to enfeoff and populate the area. Furthermore, his territories lay on the fringes of former Lacy power, in a region where native Gaelic power was still strong. Alan was not the only member of his family allotted Ulster lands from the English. His brother, Thomas, and his cousin, Donnchad mac Gilla Brigte, Earl of Carrick, also received grants of lands nearby. (Note: Donnchad was a first cousin once removed of Alan and Thomas. Donnchad's father was Gilla Brigte, son of Fergus of Galloway.)

== In English service ==
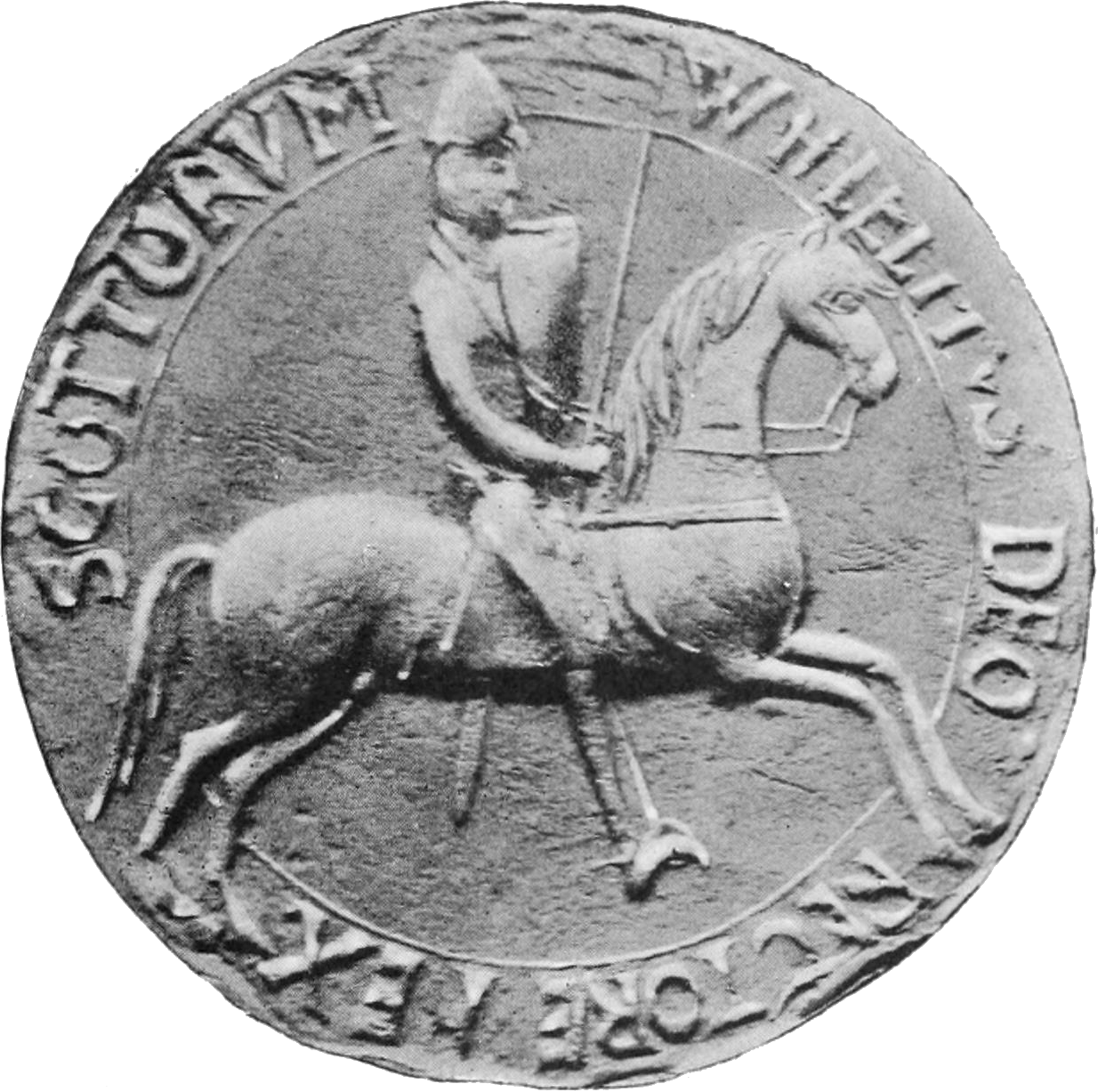
Image a

Image b

Great seals of Scottish kings William I (image a) and Alexander II (image b), depicting the armament of a late twelfth- and early thirteenth-century mounted knight. William's seal shows a knight wearing a conical-shaped nasal helmet and a mail hauberk, armed with a three-streamered lance, sword, and convex shield. The knight in the latter device wears a flat-topped helmet fitted with a visor, whilst a long surcoat is worn over the hauberk. Alexander's seal bears the earliest representation of the royal coat of arms of Scotland. (Note: There is no contemporary depiction or description of a coat of arms borne by Alan. The arms attributed to his family are first recorded in the Fife Roll, an early fourteenth-century armorial. The seals of the family of his Morville ancestors were charged with a lion, and some of the seals used by Thomas and Alan's descendants contained the same heraldic beast. Whilst the Morvilles' lion may account for the lion borne by Alan and Thomas, another possibility is that the brothers' lion is ultimately derived from that borne by Henry I, father-in-law of their great-grandfather, Fergus. The use of a lion by Alan is in stark contrast to other maritime-orientated magnates on Scotland's west coast who bore a lymphad. The seal of Alan's daughter, Dervorguilla, contained a shield charged with a lion rampant, crowned. The coat arms of Hugh de Balliol (1272), eldest son of Dervorguilla and John de Balliol, is recorded in Glover's Roll, and alludes to both his paternal and maternal ancestry. It is the same as his father yet differenced by an escutcheon azure charged with a crowned lion rampant argent in sinister chief over all. Not all of the seals known to have borne by Alan were charged with a lion. For example, the seals attached to two particular grants to Hugh of Crawford contained a shield apparently charged with a saltire.)

In July 1212, John summoned Alan to send one thousand of the "best and most vigorous" Gallovidian troops to assist the English forces in a planned campaign directed at northern Wales. The fact that William appears to have been in John's presence at Carlisle in late June, conceivably with Alan and Thomas as well, suggests that John's solicitation for Alan's military support had William's consent. (Note: It is also possible, however, that this meeting between kings was only planned, and did not actually take place.) In fact, the Scots had previously received military aid against the Meic Uilleim in the form of Brabantine mercenaries lent by John, which may reveal that William used John's summons as an opportunity to make recompense. Although Alan accepted the summons, he refused to pay for the troops' upkeep as John had originally requested. This may show that Alan reasoned that his refusal would avoid any suggestion that Galloway owed England military service. Late in 1214, William died and was succeeded by his son, Alexander II. According to Gesta Annalia I, it was shortly after Alexander's inauguration that Alan received royal confirmation of his right to the constableship.

Up until 1215, Alan was able to successfully serve both his liege lords: the kings of England and Scotland. As time progressed, however, the political situation in England began to deteriorate, and John faced ever-mounting baronial resistance. Meanwhile, in Scotland, Alexander associated himself with some of John's leading opponents. Although Alan likely attempted to maintain dual allegiances for as long as possible, he soon threw in his lot with John's cause. From about January to Easter, John had been in continuous negotiations with the rebel barons. On 5 May 1215, after a breakdown in mediations, the rebels renounced their fealty to the king. On the same day, John authorised a prest of three hundred merks to Alan, (Note: Thomas and Robert de Brus also received a loan from John on the same day.) an act that appears to reveal the importance that the king placed upon Alan's substantial military arsenal.

Alan's name as it appears in Magna Carta of 1215. It reads in Latin "Alani de Galeweya constabularii Scocie" ("Alan of Galloway, Constable of Scotland").

Midway through June, John was forced to accept the terms of his opponents, and so confirmed the charter of liberties known as Magna Carta, a concession that led most of the rebel barons to renew their pledges of homage to him. Alan's involvement in the negotiations is evidenced by the fact that he was in the king's presence in Windsor on 3 June, when he is recorded to have exchanged gifts with the king. (Note: Alan gave the king a hound for two geese.) Furthermore, Alan's name is one of twenty-seven advisors recorded in the preamble of the charter, revealing that he was one of the magnates who counselled the king regarding the document. Clear evidence of Alan's influence on the deliberations may be the inclusion of a provision—clause fifty-nine—requiring John to satisfy certain grievances claimed by Alexander. By the end of June, Alan was confirmed in his Irish lands, whilst Thomas received custody of the castle of Antrim, and was granted an Ulster lordship centred at Coleraine. Also in 1215, Henry de Loundres, Archbishop of Dublin, the Justiciar of Ireland, was ordered by the English Crown to allow Alan to transport goods between Ulster and Galloway.

== End of English-Scottish ambiguity ==
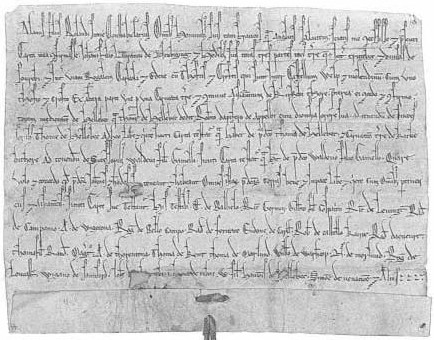
Charter of confirmation granted by Alan to John of Newbiggin.

When John later rejected Magna Carta, and Alexander took up arms against him, Alan sided with the latter, and appears to have taken a considerable part in the subsequent conflict. In 1216, for instance, Alan was identified as a rebel in arms by an English government memorandum, and the Chronicle of Melrose reports that Gallovidians formed part of the Scottish army that invaded Northumberland in July 1217. (Note: Earlier in February, Alan's Gallovidian's may have formed part of the host that ravaged the abbey of Holm Cultram, as recorded by the Chronicle of Melrose.) Furthermore, when the English ordered Alexander to hand over custody of the castle of Carlisle in September 1217, Alan's name was also included in the correspondence directed at the Scots.

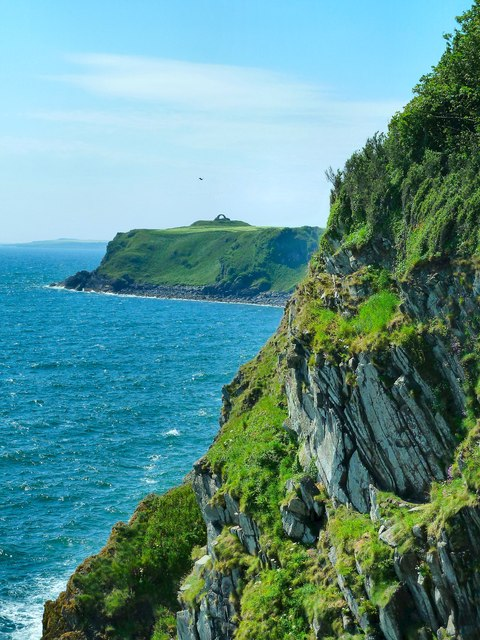
Ruinous Cruggleton Castle from a distance. The fortress was likely the western power centre of Alan, and may have been built by his father.

A particular war-time charter granted by Alan, confirming the lands of Kirkby Thore and Hillbeck to John of Newbiggin, also evidences Alan's allegiance with Alexander against John. Although these particular lands laid within Westmorland, and had been granted by John to Robert de Vieuxpont in 1203, Alan's Morville ancestors had held the district as late as 1173, giving him a claim to the region. (Note: Robert de Vieuxpont's maternal grandfather was Hugh de Morville, one of the killers of St Thomas of Canterbury.) The charter itself may have been granted in Westmorland, no earlier than about June 1216 and no later than about October 1217, and indicates that Robert's effective overlordship of the region had been superseded by Alan. The names of many of those who attested the charter had strong familial or tenurial connections with Scotland, and many were open opponents of John. Not only does the charter reveal that Alan pursued territorial claims whilst serving Scottish interests, but it forms part of a body of evidence suggesting that Alexander envisaged the imposition of Scottish royal authority over Northumberland. Although Alan's war-time acquisitions in northern England were only temporary, appearing to have lasted about a year, the after-effects of his influence reverberated for years to come. For instance, in about 1219 his clerk was indicted for unlawfully drawing revenues in Penrith, and in 1223 Robert de Vieuxpont was still having difficulty regaining possession of lands that Alan had confirmed to John of Newbiggin.

== Re-engagement with the English ==
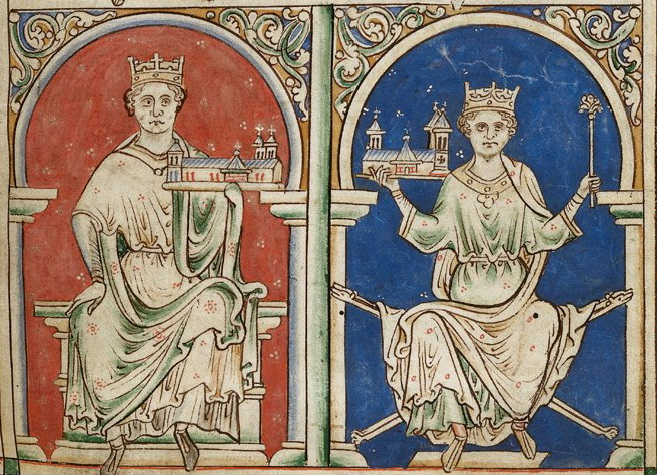
Mid-thirteenth-century depiction of English kings John and Henry III, in Matthew Paris' Historia Anglorum.

The peace secured between the English and Scottish kings did not lead to Alan's speedily return to business south of the border. Contributing factors to Alan's tardiness in English affairs were likely the death of his mother in June 1217, and his subsequent succession to the Morville inheritance of Lauderdale and Cunningham, substantial territorial blocks within the Scottish realm. In fact, Alan does not appear to have enjoyed the same amiable relationship with Henry's regime as he had during John's administration, and it wasn't until 1220 that matters concerning Alan's fealty to Henry, and the confirmation of Alan's English and Irish estates were finally settled. (Note: Alan's brother, on the other hand, rendered homage to Henry in June 1219, after which he was confirmed in his Irish lands.) In April of that year, correspondence was sent on behalf of Alan to Henry explaining that Alan and his brother were unable to make use of their Ulster lands. The English Crown thereupon ordered that Alan's lands were to restored to him, with a directive to that effect issued to Geoffrey de Marisco, Justiciar of Ireland, and a request for Alan to attend the upcoming summit between Alexander and Henry at York. Consequently, in June, Alan rendered homage to Henry at the aforementioned assembly, where he duly received confirmation of his English and Irish possessions, and was one of the twelve Scottish magnates who swore to uphold Alexander's oath that the latter would marry one of Henry's sisters, either Joan or Isabella. (Note: Alexander went on to marry Joan in 1221.)

== Peripheral operations ==
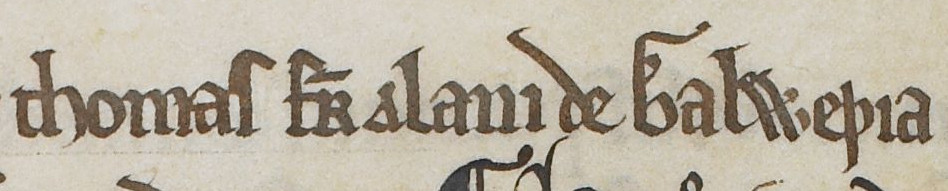
The name of Alan and his brother, Thomas fitz Roland, as they appear in British Library Cotton Faustina B IX (the Chronicle of Melrose): "Thomas frater Alani de Galweþia".

Little is certain of Alan's activities in the early 1220s, although his position as constable suggests that he was involved in Alexander's peripheral campaigns during these years. One such operation, directed deep into the Highlands against a certain Domnall mac Niall, seems to have been based from Inverness, and perhaps directed into the Strathspey and Great Glen regions. Alexander's success in this campaign may have led to his establishment of the Comyns in Badenoch, and to the creation of lordships in Stratherrick, Boleskine, and Abertarff. It is unknown if this campaign was connected to the maritime operations undertaken by Alan's brother in the same year. According to the Annals of Loch Cé, Thomas had slain Diarmait Ua Conchobair, a claimant to the kingship of Connacht, whilst the latter was en route to Connacht with a mercenary fleet recruited in the Hebrides. In fact, this clash may have been related to an ultimately unsuccessful Scottish intrusion into Argyll in the same year.

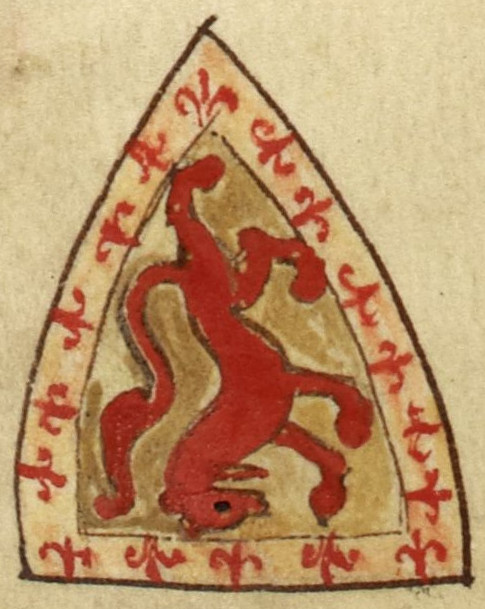
Alexander II's coat of arms as it appears on folio 146v of British Library Royal 14 C VII (Historia Anglorum). This inverted shield signifies the king's death in 1249.

The only record of this Argyllian campaign is preserved by Gesta Annalia I, which notes that Alexander's forces included Gallovidians. Both this source and the Orygynale Cronykil of Scotland by Andrew Wyntoun, reveal that Alexander's troops mounted a second and successful assault the following year, resulting in the region's submission. The target of Alexander's animosity may have been Ruaidrí mac Ragnaill, Lord of Kintyre, who appears to have held Kintyre and the outer Islands of the Clyde. It is uncertain if the latter had been aiding the Meic Uilleim, although his recorded involvement with Thomas in 1212 against the Cenél nEógain suggests otherwise. If, on the other hand, Ruaidrí had involved himself with Diarmait, an opponent of Henry's ally Cathal Crobderg Ua Conchobair, King of Connacht, Ruaidrí would have placed himself at odds with both English and Scottish interests. Whatever the case, following the second royal campaign into Argyll, Alexander soon consolidated his authority in the Firth of Clyde through the apparent expulsion of Ruaidrí, the construction of a royal castle at Tarbert, the erection of a royal burgh at Dumbarton in 1222, and the eventual endowment of Cowal to the family of the royal steward.

== Ulster ambitions ended ==
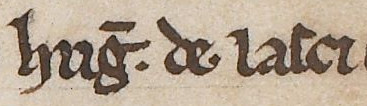
The name of Hugh de Lacy, Alan's long-time enemy and later father-in-law, as it appears in British Library Cotton Faustina B IX: "Hugone de Laſci".

In 1223 and 1224, Hugh de Lacy waged war to recover his former Irish lands, allied himself to Áed Méith, and soon overran most of Ulster. In regard to Alan's family during this resurgence, the Annals of Ulster reveal that Áed Méith destroyed Thomas' castle at Coleraine. Alan wrote to Henry in 1224, stating that he had been active in the king's service from June to September, and was about to launch a planned invasion of Ireland, but had just received intelligence indicating that a deal had been concluded between Hugh and the justiciar; additionally in his letter, Alan asked the king for confirmation of such a truce, and requested, in the event that Hugh were to be restored to favour, that his own and his brother's lands would be safeguarded by the king. Although Alan received a royal licence to colonise his Irish lands the following year, there is no evidence that he or his brother were able to develop them.

Late in 1225, Thomas received monetary aid from the king in the form of an annuity of one hundred marks, likely meant to cover the military and territorial losses suffered by Thomas in Ulster. Despite the reassurances from the English that the brothers' lands were to be protected, there is evidence suggesting that, by as late as 1227, their lands were still under threat from Hugh. (Note: The Annals of Ulster report that the castle of Coleraine was reconstructed in 1228.) In 1229, Alan and Thomas were listed amongst other Irish tenants-in-chief summoned to take part in a planned English military campaign in France. Although Thomas obeyed the king, Alan—who had not received royal compensation for his toils in Ireland—declined Henry's summons. It was likely in the same year that Alan married Hugh's daughter, Rose, as recorded by the Chronicle of Lanercost. (Note: According to the Chronicle of Lanercost, Alan nearly drowned upon his return from Ireland.) It is possible that Alan commenced this union in an effort to salvage something of his family's prospects in Ulster which had by then fallen under Hugh's overlordship. It may have also been an attempt by Alan to gain another ally to assist him in the Isles. In any case, the Irish ambitions that Alan had doggedly pursued since 1212 had finally come to an end.

== Instability and kin-strife in the Isles ==
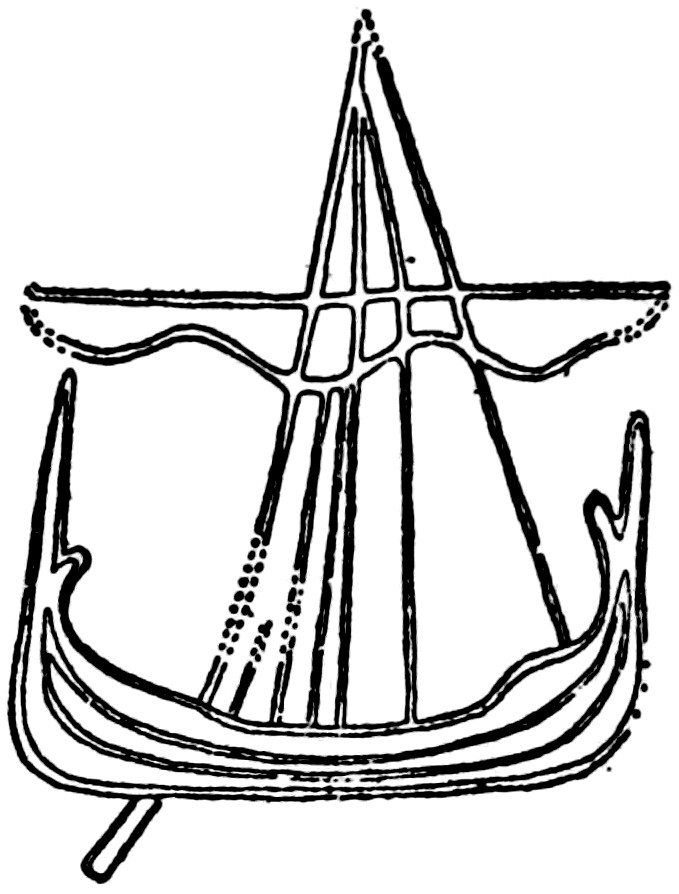
Detail from Maughold IV, a Manx runestone displaying a contemporary sailing vessel. The power of the kings of the Isles, and partly Alan himself, laid in their armed galley-fleets.

Although the return and restoration of Hugh almost certainly contributed to Alan's inability to succeed in Ulster, the latter may have overextended his resources pursuing interests in the Isles. When Gofraid mac Amlaíb, King of the Isles died in 1187, he had apparently intended that his younger son, Amlaíb Dub, would succeed to the kingship. Since the latter had been only a child at the time, the Islesmen instead inaugurated Ragnall, Gofraid's eldest (albeit illegitimate) son. As the first quarter of the thirteenth century began to wane, contentions between the half-brothers broke out into outright war, and Alan is recorded aiding Ragnall against Amlaíb Dub.

From the perspective of the Scots, the instability in the Isles was almost certainly a cause for concern. Conflict amongst the Islesmen could have led to hostilities overflowing into the Scottish realm, and feuding in the Isles could have been exploited by elements opposed to the Scottish crown. As a result, it is possible that Scots decided to support one half-brother against another, in the expectation that the victor would destroy the power of his rival, thus restoring stability in the region. Of the two, Ragnall appears to have been the most palatable to the Scots, and may have been a key player in Scottish plans to counter the threat of the Meic Uilleim, and their probable Ulster supporters, the Uí Néill.

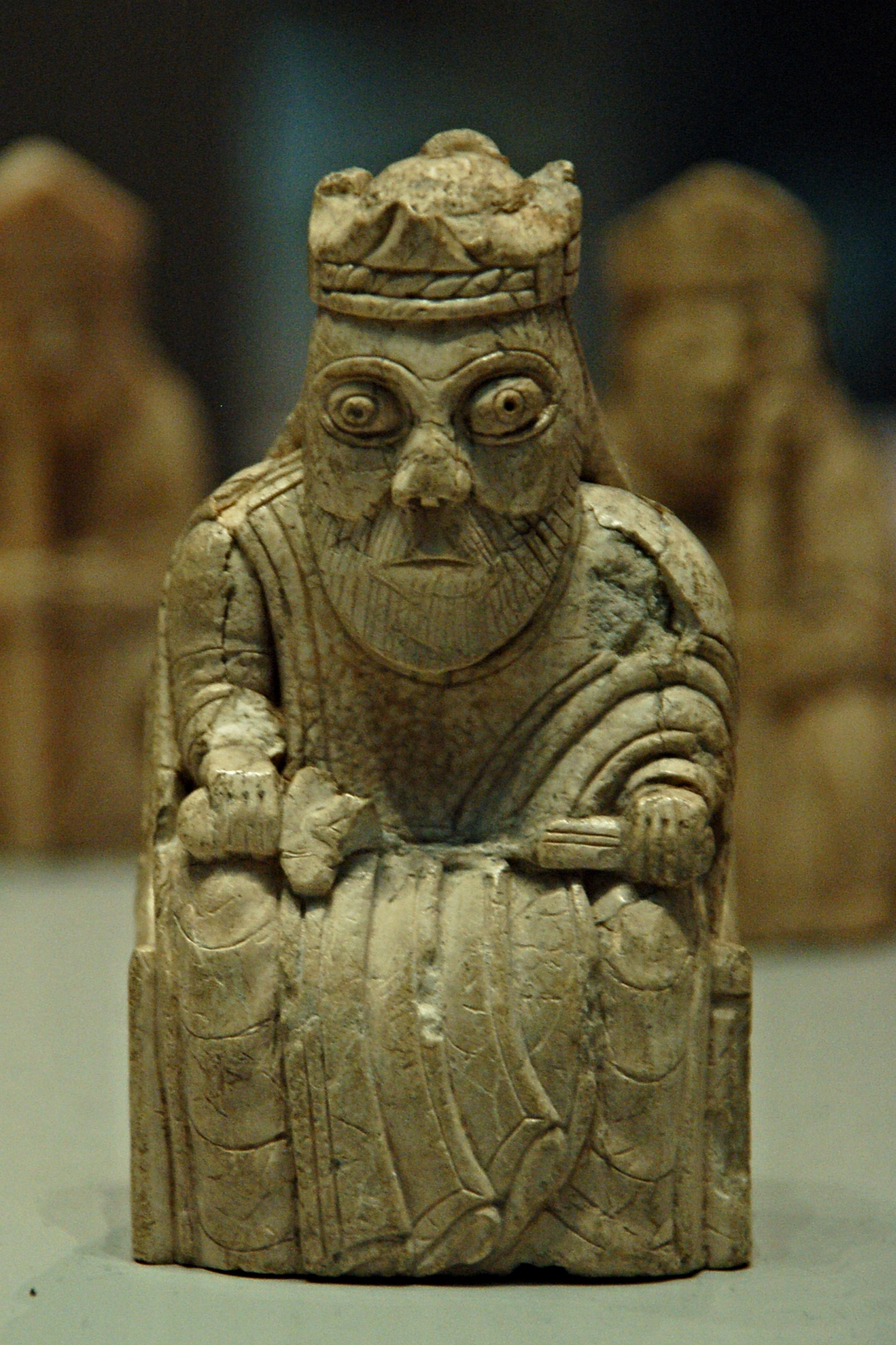
A king gaming piece of the so-called Lewis chessmen. Comprising some four sets, the pieces are thought to have been crafted in Norway in the twelfth- and thirteenth centuries. They were uncovered in Lewis in the early nineteenth century.

In about 1225, the Chronicle of Mann records that Alan aided Ragnall in an unsuccessful military expedition in the Hebrides against Amlaíb Dub. Shortly afterwards in about 1225 or 1226, the same source states that an unnamed daughter of Ragnall married Thomas, Alan's illegitimate son. Unfortunately for Ragnall, the marital alliance appears to have cost him the kingship, since the chronicle records that the Manxmen had him removed from power and replaced with Amlaíb Dub. The recorded resentment of the marital alliance may indicate that Alan's son was intended to eventually succeed Ragnall, who was perhaps about sixty years-old at the time. A plan intended to place a Scottish magnate's son on the throne would have been almost certainly encouraged by the Scottish crown, considering its potential to bring stability to the region, and the prospect of expanding Scottish royal authority.

Following his expulsion, Ragnall appears to have gone into exile at Alan's court in Galloway. In 1228, whilst Amlaíb Dub and his chieftains were absent in Hebrides, the chronicle records the invasion of Mann by Ragnall, Alan, and Thomas. The attack appears to have resulted in the complete devastation of the southern half of the island, since the chronicle declares that it was almost reduced to a desert. The chronicle's report that Alan installed bailiffs on Mann, with instructions to collect tribute from the island and send it back to Galloway, may reveal the price that Ragnall had to pay for Alan's support in the affair. Suffering serious setbacks at the hands of his enemies, Amlaíb Dub reached out for English assistance against Ragnall, as evidenced from correspondence dating to the same year, between Henry and Amlaíb Dub, in which the latter alluded to aggression dealt from Alan. Gallovidian successes were short-lived, however, as once Alan left Mann for home, Amlaíb Dub and his forces arrived on the scene, and routed the remaining Gallovidians.

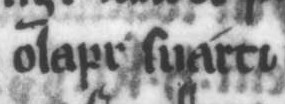
The name of Alan's opponent, Amlaíb Dub mac Gofraid, as it appears on folio 163r of AM 47 fol (Eirspennill): "Olafr suárti".

Early in January 1229, Ragnall launched yet another invasion of Mann. Although the chronicle's description of the attack alludes to Gallovidian involvement, as it states that the expedition originated from Galloway, the fact that Ragnall commanded only five ships suggests that this support may have been waning. Weeks later, Ragnall and Amlaíb Dub met in battle on Mann, where the former was finally defeated and slain. The lack of substantial Gallovidan support in Ragnall's final foray may have been due to a flare-up of insurrection in Scotland that required Alan's immediate attention as constable of the realm. According to Bower, a certain Gilla Escoip, who was almost certainly a Meic Uilleim, had burned the castle of Abertarff and sacked Inverness. Alexander's presence at Elgin in June 1228 corroborates Bower's claim that royal forces operated in the north against Gilla Escoip. The campaign itself appears to have been long and arduous, as Bower reports that Gilla Escoip and his two sons were slain in the following year. Alexander appears to have conducted further operations in the north in 1230, about the time that the Meic Uilleim were extirpated once and for all.

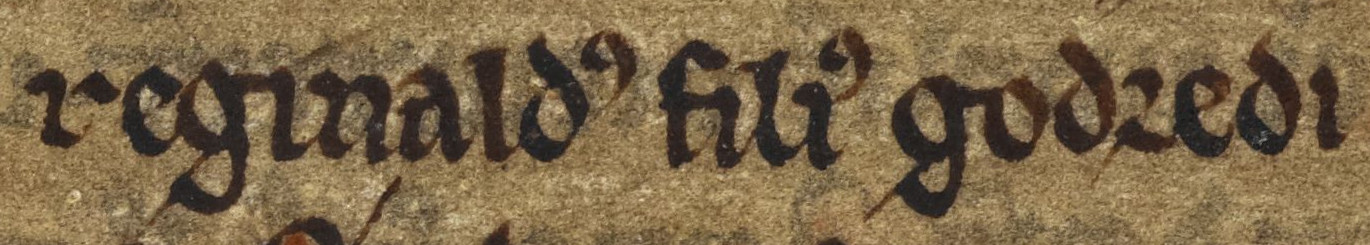
The name of Alan's ally, Ragnall mac Gofraid, as it appears on folio 40v of British Library Cotton Julius A VII (the Chronicle of Mann): "Reginaldus filjus Godredi".

Although Alan's marital alliance with Ragnall had likely been welcomed by the Scottish crown, the fact that the two were unable to quickly deal with Amlaíb Dub caused serious repercussions. The Meic Uilleim insurrection of 1228–1230, for instance, may have been a byproduct of the instability prolonged by Alan's involvement in the Isles. Even so, Alan's actions appear to have also led to the end of Irish support for the Meic Uilleim. If he had indeed married Rose in 1229, for instance, this union may well have compelled her father to disassociate Áed Méith from lending support to the Meic Uilleim. Whatever the case, Uí Néill ambitions in the Isles appear to have come to an abrupt end with Áed Méith's death the following year, after-which the latter's kin became embroiled for years in a struggle against the Meic Lochlainn over the kingship of Tír Eoghain.

== Escalation and confrontation in the Isles ==
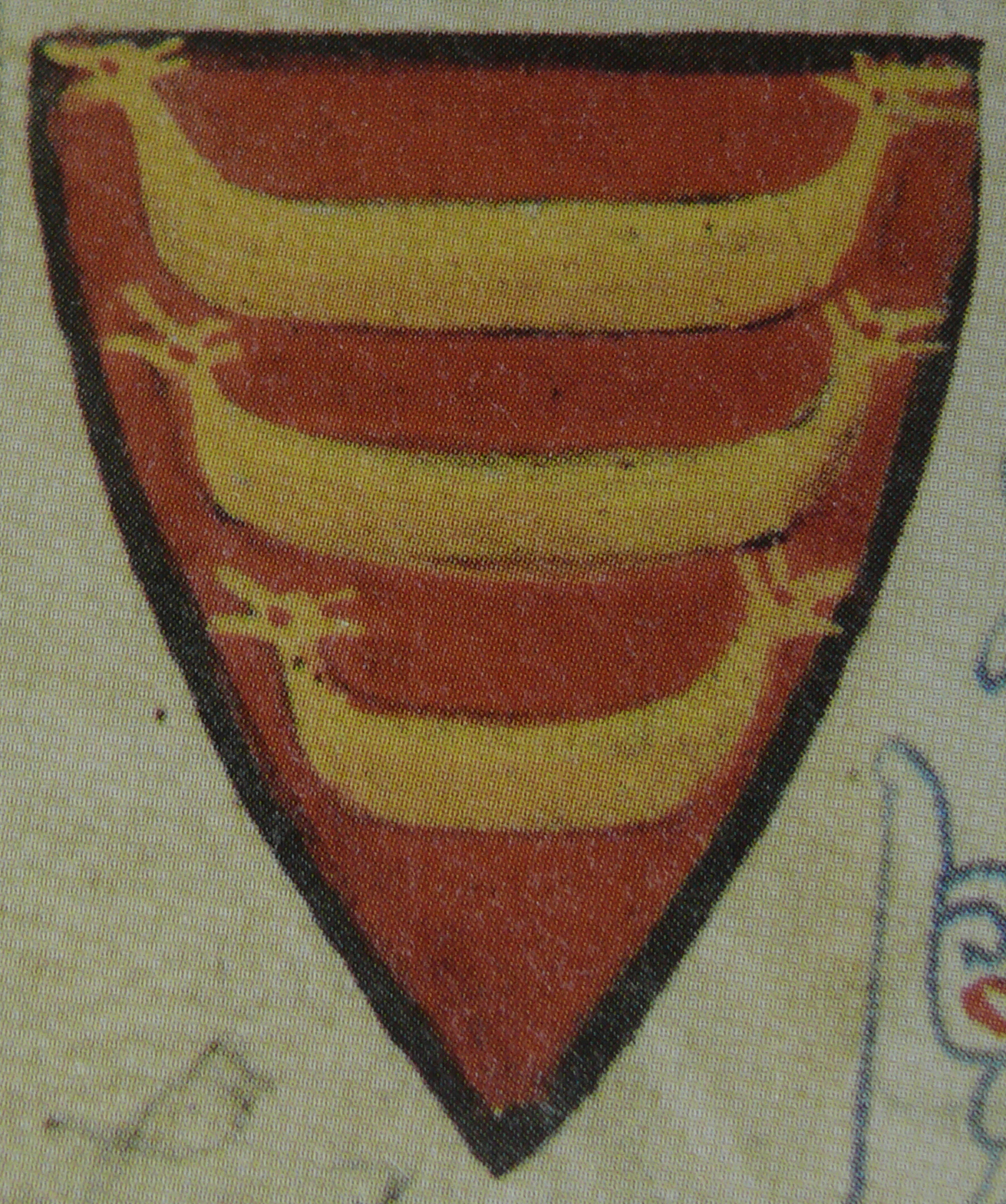
Coat of arms attributed to Hákon Hákonarson, King of Norway as it appears on folio 216v of Cambridge Corpus Christi College 16 II.

The death of Alan's ally did not deter Gallovidian interests in the Isles. In fact, it is probable that Alan and certain members of the Meic Somairle—Dubgall and Donnchad, sons of Dubgall mac Somairle—continued to harass the recently inaugurated Amlaíb Dub. According to Hákonar saga Hákonarsonar, reports of open warfare in the Isles reached the court of Hákon Hákonarson, King of Norway, the nominal overlord of the Isles, in the summer of 1229. Specifically, the saga singles out the aforementioned sons of Dubgall mac Somairle as "unfaithful" to the Norwegian king, and several versions of the source describe Alan as the "greatest warrior at that time", possessing a large force of men and ships with which he plundered throughout the Hebrides. Early in 1230, Amlaíb Dub arrived at the king's court, having been forced from the Isles by Alan and his allies.

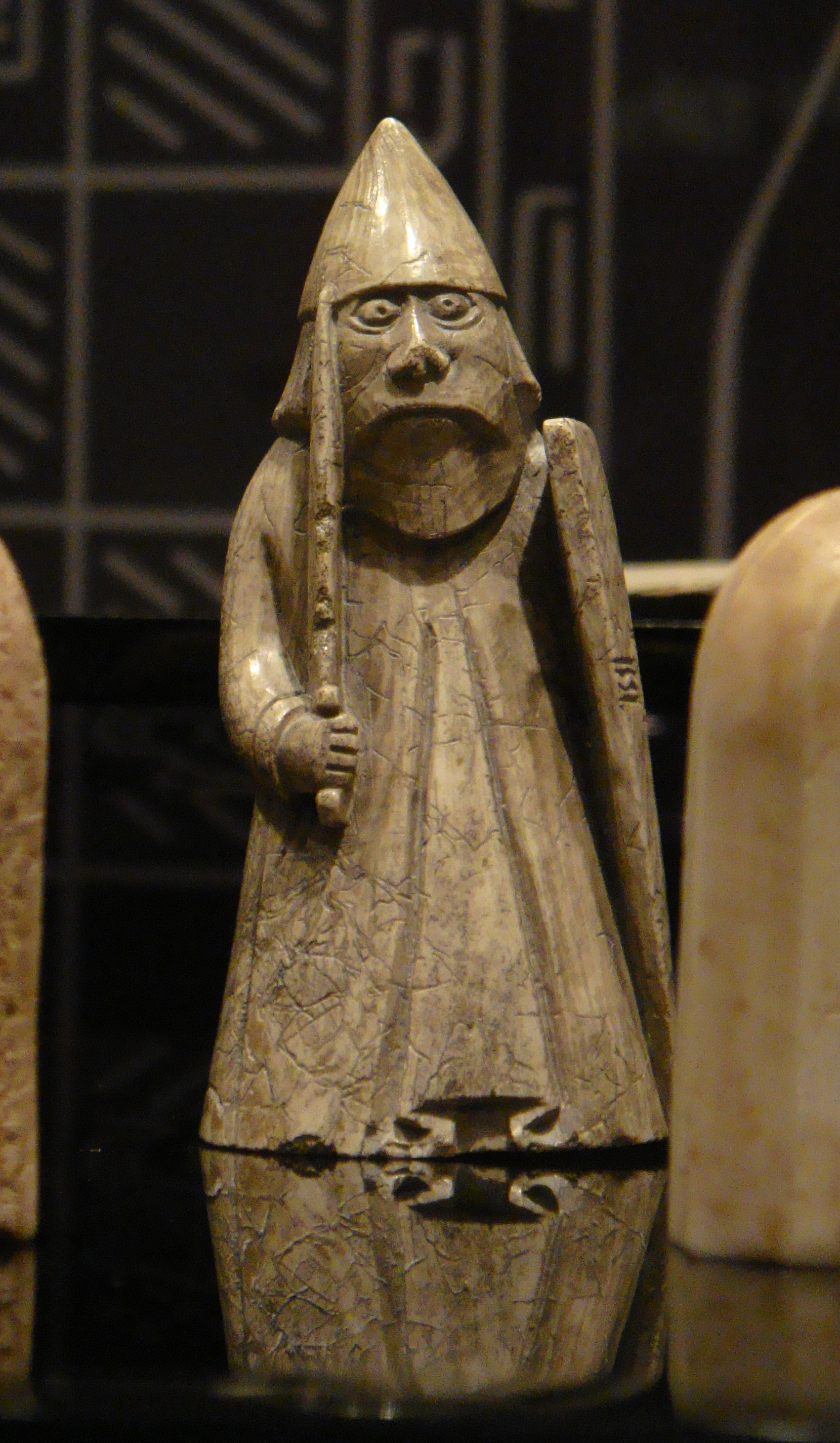
One of the so-called Lewis chessmen. The Scandinavian connections of leading members of the Isles may have been reflected in their military armament, and could have resembled that depicted upon such gaming pieces.

Several versions of the saga allege that Alan had boasted that it was no harder to sail to Norway than it was to sail from Norway to Scotland, suggesting that Alan thought himself capable of even invading Norway. In fact, this bluster may well have been designed by Amlaíb Dub to direct further Norse animosity at Alan. Whatever the case, the saga reveals that Hákon had begun preparations for a military campaign in the Isles well before Amlaíb Dub's arrival. In fact, the king is stated to have appointed a certain Óspakr as King of the Isles, giving him command of the Norwegian fleet tasked with restoring peace in the region. Within days of Amlaíb Dub's arrival in Norway, Óspakr's twelve-ship fleet set sail for the Isles, gaining another twenty after reaching Orkney. The campaign itself is documented in several sources, such as the Chronicle of Mann, the Chronicle of Lanercost, and the Icelandic annals, with the most detailed source being Hákonar saga Hákonarsonar. Once in the Isles at Islay, the fleet met up with three members of the Meic Somairle, apparently kinsmen of Óspakr, including the aforementioned sons of Dubgall mac Somairle. At about this point, the saga states that the fleet had reached a size of eighty ships, a number which suggests a fighting force of about three thousand men.

Meanwhile, news of the gathering Norse fleet reached Alexander, who appears to have made straight for the western coast, diverting his attention to the now rapidly developing crisis. On 28 May, Alan is recorded in the presence of the king at Ayr, where the Scottish royal forces appear to have assembled. It was probably June when the Norse fleet finally rounded Kintyre, entered the Firth of Clyde, and made landfall on Bute, where Óspakr's forces stormed and captured the castle of Rothesay. The fortress itself was a holding of Walter fitz Alan II, Steward of Scotland, which may well reveal the anxiety felt by the Meic Somairle in the face of the steward's steadily increasing regional influence. Reports that Alan was in the vicinity, at the command of a massive fleet, forced the Norse to withdraw to Kintyre. In fact, the Eirspennill version of the saga numbers Alan's fleet at almost two hundred ships, whilst the Flateyjarbók, Frísbók, and Skálholtsbók versions number it at one hundred and fifty. These totals suggest that Alan commanded a force of two thousand or three thousand men.

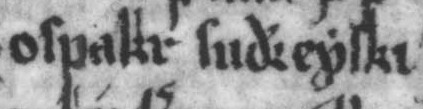
The name of Óspakr, a claimant to the kingship of the Isles, as it appears on folio 138v of AM 47 fol: "Ospakr suðreyski".

It was perhaps following the Norse withdrawal to Kintyre that Óspakr succumbed to wounds suffered on Bute, whereupon command was assumed by Amlaíb Dub. (Note: The chronicle states that Óspakr died during the storming of the castle on Bute. The saga, on the other-hand, states that he died after the Norse fleet withdrew from Alan's fleet.) The latter then used the fleet to serve his own needs, diverting it to Mann, where he used it to reinstate himself on the island. There the Norwegians overwintered before returning for home in 1231, and following the death of Ragnall's illegitimate son Gofraid Donn, King of the Isles the same year, Amlaíb Dub regained complete control of the island kingdom. (Note: Gofraid Donn had accompanied Amlaíb Dub during the Norse campaign. Once the latter reinstated himself on Mann, the Chronicle of Mann states that two shared the kingship—with Amlaíb Dub ruling Mann itself, and Gofraid Donn ruling the Hebridean portions of the kingdom.) The events of 1230–1231 marked a dramatic end of Alan's ambitions in the Isles. Even though it had not been his intention, Alan's prolonged campaigning against Amlaíb Dub had caused a grave international crisis. In fact, the Norse had not been intent on solely restoring order in the Isles, but had directed their retaliatory campaign squarely at Scottish-held territories, thereby endangering the recent westward advances of the Scottish crown. Although Alan's unexpected appearance in force off Kintyre had overawed the Norse, the Scots had only narrowly averted full-scale war, and as a result, Alan almost certainly incurred Alexander's subsequent displeasure.

== Family ==
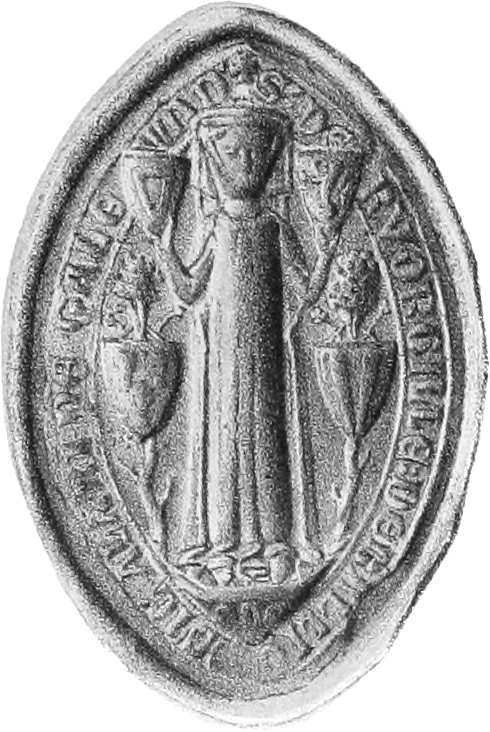
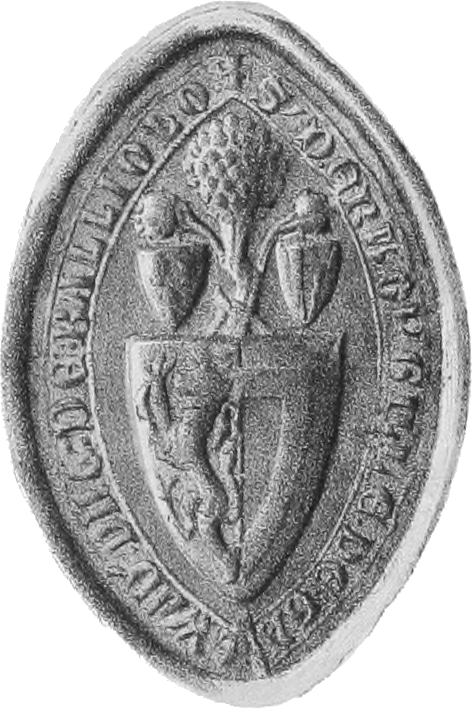
Seal (left) and counter-seal (right) of Alan's daughter, Dervorguilla, wife of John de Balliol. (Note: In regard to the shields on the seal, clockwise, the escutcheon held in the lady's dexter hand displays an orle, representing the arms of Balliol; the escutcheon held in her sinister hand displays a lion rampant crowned, representing the arms of Galloway; the escutcheon beneath the first displays three garbs, representing the Earldom of Chester; the escutcheon beneath the second displays three piles in point, representing the Earldom of Huntingdon, which in turn commemorates the status of her uncle, John, Earl of Huntingdon, to whom she was a co-heir.)

Alan was married three times. His first wife appears to have been a daughter of Roger de Lacy, Constable of Chester. (Note: On one hand, it is possible that the Arthurian romance Roman de Fergus, thought to date to the late twelfth- or early thirteenth-century, may have been composed on behalf of Alan to celebrate this marriage. On the other hand, the work could have been composed to celebrate the marriage of his daughter, Dervorguilla. Another possibility is that Alan's father was responsible for the composition.) It was likely upon this union that Alan gained the English lordship of Kippax as maritagium from his father-in-law. (Note: The Latin term maritagium refers to the property that the father of a bride gave to his daughter, her husband, or the couple together. Surviving sources show that, at one point Alan ordered his bailiff, Herbert de Arches, to take possession of Swillington as an escheat. In fact, Swillington is described by Domesday Book as pertaining to the manor of Kippax, and Alan's order to his bailiff reveals that he was exercising his rights in the region. Earlier at some point before his father-in-law's death in 1211, there is evidence of Alan's lordship in the region in the form of the record of his transference of the advowson of the church of Kippax to his father-in-law.) Alan's second marriage, to David's daughter Margaret, is dated to 1209 by the Chronicle of Lanercost and Chronicle of Melrose. The date of Alan's third marriage, to Hugh's daughter Rose, is generally thought to date to 1229, as stated by the Chronicle of Lanercost. Another possible date for this marriage is about a decade earlier. Alan's second marriage, therefore, allied him to the Scottish royal family, and his first and third marriages allied him to the two main branches of the powerful Lacy family—firstly the Pontefract branch, and afterwards the Woebley branch. (Note: The branches were unrelated in the patrilineal line as the original patrilineal line of Pontefract Lacys had died out in 1193. Alan's first father-in-law, Roger de Lacy, adopted the surname of his Lacy grandmother.)

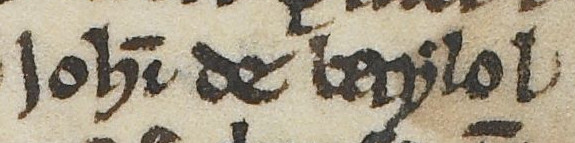
The name of John de Balliol, one of Alan's sons-in-law and successors, as it appears in British Library Cotton Faustina B IX: "Johanni de Baẏlol".

Alan had several children from his first two marriages, although only daughters appear to have reached adulthood. One daughter from his first marriage died whilst a Scottish hostage of the English king, her death being reported in June 1213. Helen, another daughter from Alan's first marriage, married Roger de Quincy. Although the date of this union is unknown, it may have taken place before Alan's death, and could well have been the point when her husband came into possession of Kippax. (Note: Later in 1254, Helen's husband granted Kippax and nearby Scholes to Edmund de Lacy, Earl of Lincoln, then the leading member of the Pontefract Lacys. Although Scholes appears to have once formed part of the original Pontefract estate, it is uncertain if the Roger gained this manor upon his marriage to Helen.) At some point before 1234, Christiana, one of Alan's daughters from his second marriage, married William de Forz. In 1233, Dervorguilla, a younger daughter from Alan's second marriage, married John de Balliol, Lord of Barnard Castle. (Note: Alan's sister, Ada, married Walter Bisset the same year. These marriages are the last recorded actions that Alan appears to have involved himself.) Alan had a son named Thomas. A product of Alan's second marriage, he was his only known legitimate male offspring. Although the date of this son's death is unknown, he may have lived into in the 1220s. Additionally, Alan had an illegitimate son, also named Thomas.

== Death ==
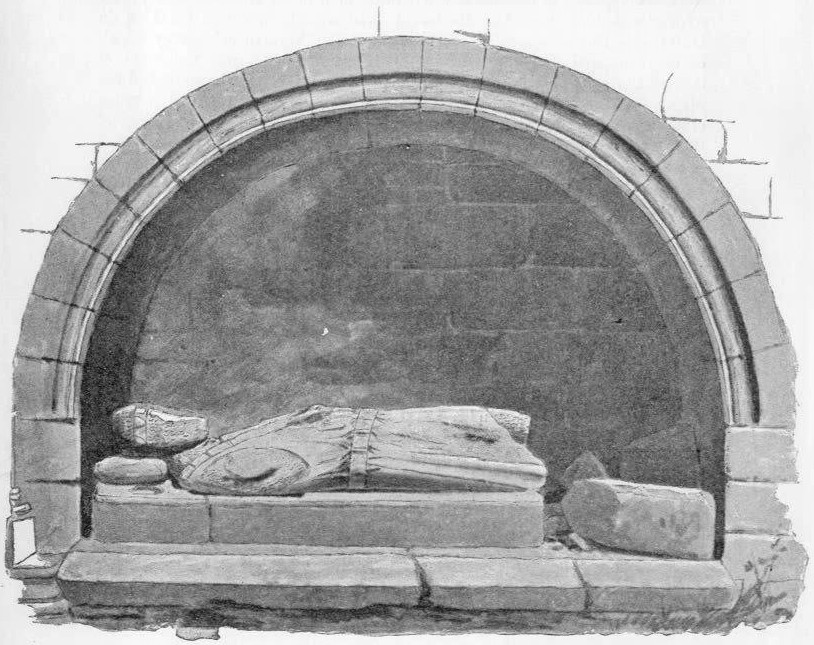
Nineteenth-century depiction of the effigy at Dundrennan Abbey generally regarded as that of Alan.

Thomas, Alan's brother, died in 1231, possibly from injuries suffered in a tournament accident. Alan's death, about three years later in 1234, is recorded by the Annals of Ulster, the Chronicle of Melrose, and the Chronicle of Lanercost—the later specifying the month February. (Note: The English place name Galloway, rendered in modern Gaelic Gall-Ghaidhealaibh, is derived from the Gaelic i nGall Gaidhealaib ("amongst the Gall Gaidheil"), in reference to a people of mixed Scandinavian-Gaelic ethnicity, known in Gaelic as the Gall Gaidheil. These people are first recorded in the ninth century, and appear to have originated in the Hebrides. The term seems to be first associated with Galloway in 1034, when the Annals of Ulster record the death of Suibne mac Cináeda, styling him in Gaelic rí Gallgaidhel ("king of the Gall Gaidheil"). This title is also assigned to Alan and his father by the same source in the annal-entries concerning their deaths, suggesting that rí Gallgaidhel was the contemporary Gaelic title borne by the rulers of Galloway.) Alan's body was interred at Dundrennan Abbey, a Cistercian religious house founded by his paternal great-grandfather. There amongst the monastic ruins, a particular dilapidated effigy of grey stone is generally identified as his. (Note: The effigy possibly dates to the thirteenth century. It lies in the north wall of the north transept. It depicts an armoured knight. The effigy's face, arms, and legs are destroyed. Traces of mail are visible, however, and the body is covered in a long clock, with a belt at its waist, and another across its right shoulder. Its legs are crossed. The souls of Alan, his father, paternal grandfather, and paternal great-grandfather were still commemorated at Holyrood Abbey as late as the fifteenth century.) As the last Gallovidian ruler in the legitimate patrilineal line descended from Fergus, Alan's death brought an abrupt end to about half a century of stable Gallovidian rule under he and his father, and the lack of a legitimate male heir to succeed himself led to a sudden succession crisis.

It is possible that Alan had hoped that his illegitimate son, Thomas, would be able succeed to the lordship. Celtic custom would not have barred the latter from the succession. According to feudal practice, however, Alan's nearest heirs were his three daughters. (Note: At the time of his death, Alan's nearest legitimate male heir was his brother's son, Patrick of Atholl, who was still a minor in 1231.) As it turned out, the Gallovidian succession was quickly seized upon by the Scottish crown. The prospect of Alan's illegitimate son succeeding to the lordship threatened to reignite Gallovdian interests in the Isles, and thereby threatened the welfare of the Scottish realm. On the other hand, the husbands of Alan's daughters were prominent men of Anglo-Norman descent, and the prospect of bringing about the demise of the semi-autonomous lordship, through its division between such eminent Englishmen, was an advantageous opportunity that Alexander could not pass up. (Note: Only one of Alan's three sons-in-law, Roger de Quincy, held any Scottish lands.)

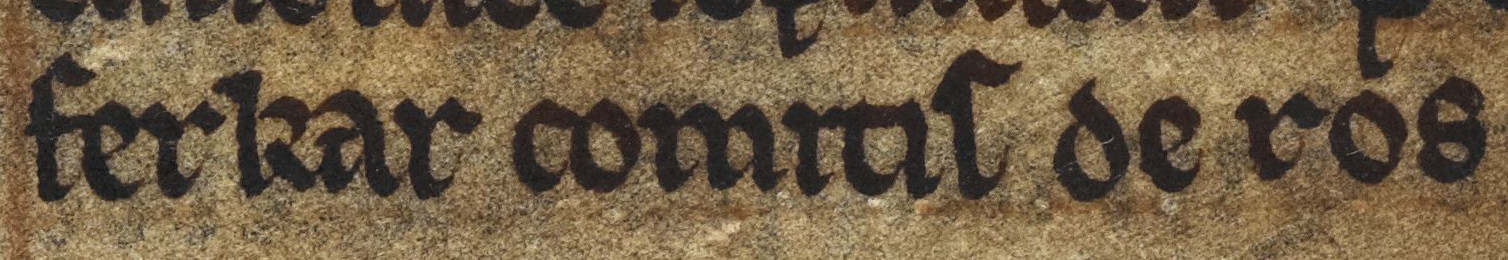
The name of Ferchar mac in tSagairt as it appears on folio 42v of British Library Cotton Julius A VII: "Ferkkar Comitis de Ros".

Although it is possible that the people of Galloway regarded Alan's illegitimate son as their rightful lord, the Chronicle of Melrose states that they appealed to Alexander to take the whole lordship into his own hands, suggesting that whilst the Gallovidians were willing to accept that illegitimacy indeed excluded Alan's son from the inheritance, they were unwilling to accept female succession. Whatever the case, Alexander denied the Gallovidian's their request, quickly crushed their subsequent retaliatory uprising, and went ahead with the tripartite partitioning. One of the Scots who played a key part in the king's destruction of the Gallovidian resistance was Ferchar mac in tSagairt, Earl of Ross, a rising star in Alexander's administration, who happened to be Amlaíb Dub's father-in-law.

Following Alan's death, the constableship passed to Roger de Quincy, husband of Alan's eldest surviving daughter, Helen. Alan's Irish lands were not inherited by his daughters. Forty years after his death, these lands are recorded in the hands of the Bissets, although precisely how this came about is uncertain. The succession of the Irish and Gallovidian lands of Alan's brother, Thomas, is also uncertain. In fact, Thomas' lands should have passed to his son, Patrick, had the latter not died on the eve of his inheritance (under suspicious circumstances, apparently at the hands of the Bissets).

== Assessment ==
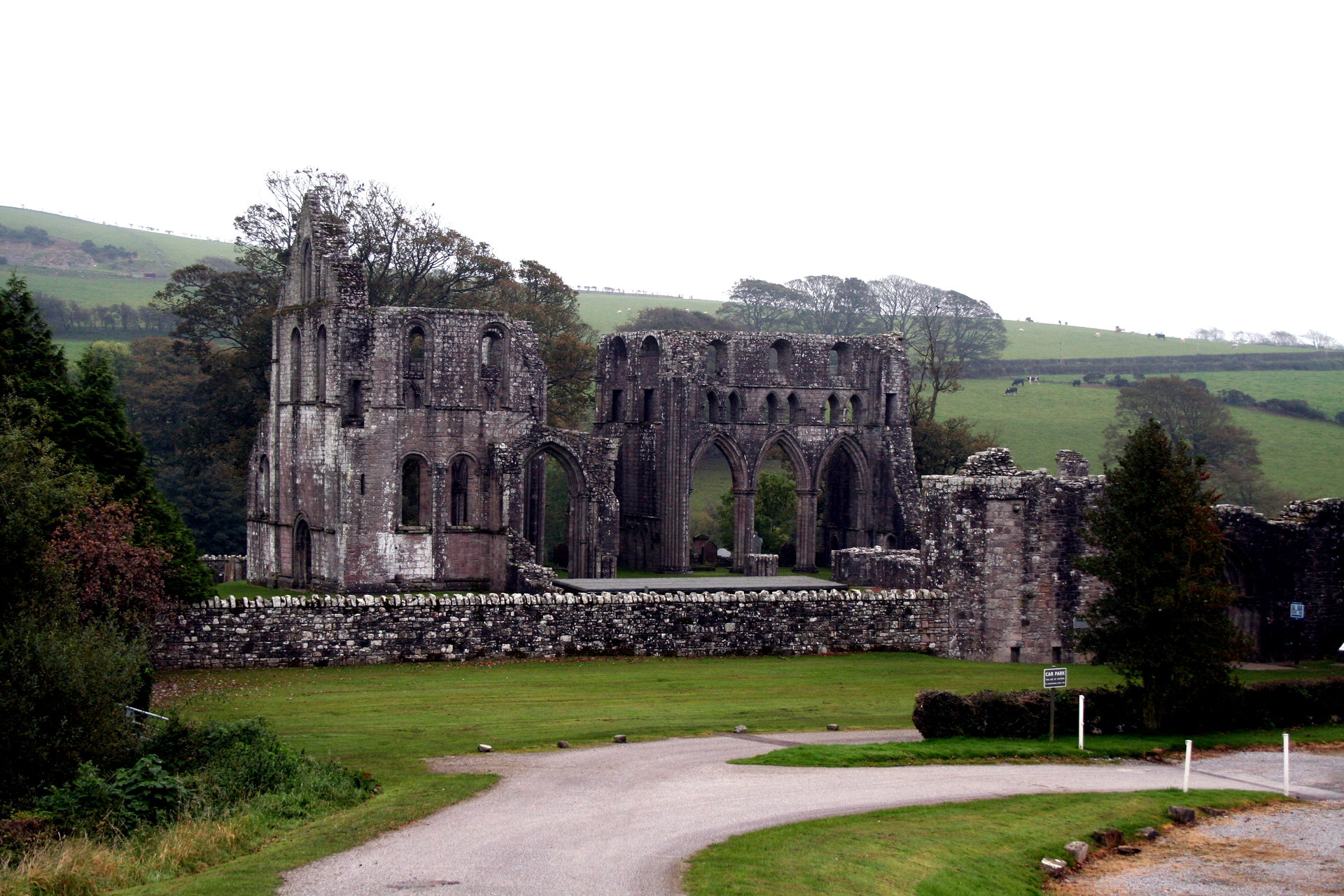
Dundrennan Abbey, the site of Alan's interment, was likely founded by his paternal great-grandfather.

Throughout his career, Alan appears to have moved seamlessly between the native Gaelic environment of Galloway, and the Frankish cultural environment of the English and Scottish royal courts. In this respect, Alan followed in his father's footsteps, who first appears in records under forms of the native Gaelic name Lochlainn, before adopting forms of the continental Roland. In fact, Alan's own name may also be evidence of Frankish influence on his family. (Note: Following the mid-eleventh-century Norman conquest of England, the names Roland and Alan were introduced into England and Scotland by settlers from the continent. In regard to Alan's father, his original Gaelic name appears in one Latin source as "Lochlan", and "Lohlan filius Huddredi" in another. Although the name Roland was generally used as a standard Latin equivalent of Lochlainn, it appears that Alan's father used the former name in everyday life, as evidenced by the Annals of Ulster, which name him in Gaelic Rolant mac Uchtraigh.) Surviving charters concerning Alan's lordship reveal that his dependants were almost exclusively drawn from the Frankish milieu. Few of these sources concern Galloway specifically, however, and not one concerns the ancestral Gallovidian patrimony. Comparatively more charter evidence survives documenting the holdings of his cousin, Donnchad, who ruled nearby Carrick. In contrast to the acta concerning Alan, these sources reveal that many of Donnchad's dependants were drawn from the native aristocracy, which could be evidence that Alan's lordship in Galloway followed a similar course.

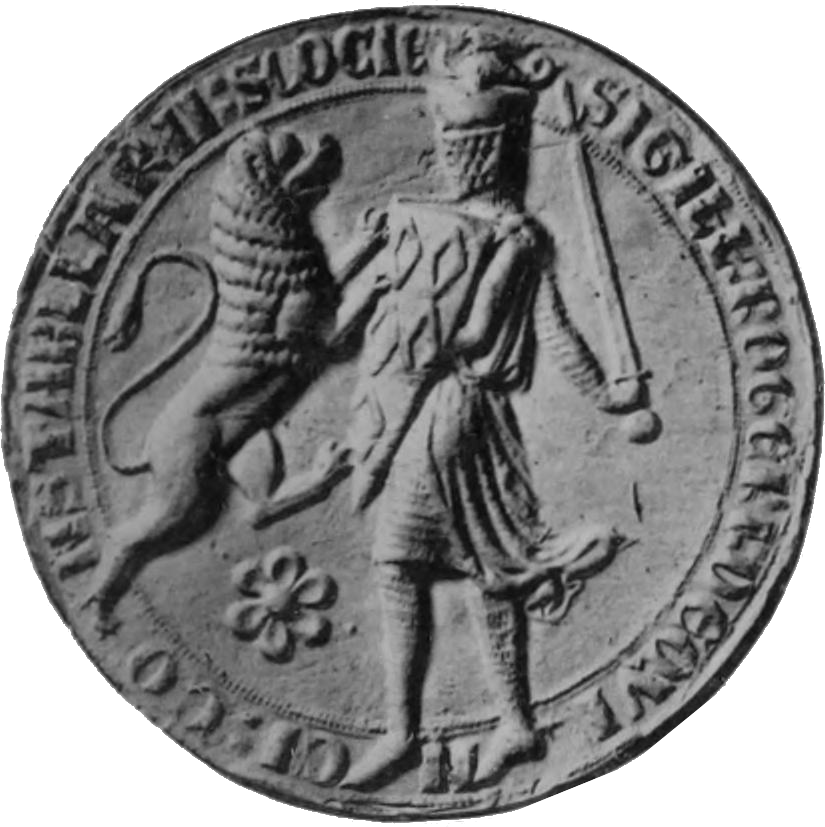
Counter-seal of Roger de Quincy, a son-in-law and successor of Alan. (Note: In 1247, Roger was besieged in Galloway. According to the thirteenth-century Chronica majora, Roger burst out of his castle "armed to the teeth mounted a valuable horse. And but few daring to follow him he opened suddenly the castle gates, and hurling himself upon them cut a way for himself with the sword through the midst of his enemies, of whom there was an endless multitude. And they fell to either side from him; and so he cleft and scattered the whole army, and narrowly escaped from danger of death".)

Although it is debatable to what extent the dramatic events of 1230–1231 influenced Alexander's break-up of Galloway, Alan's standing in the king's service diminished after 1231 and starkly contrasted that of the royal steward, Walter fitz Alan. As the lord of Renfrew, North Kyle and Bute, and allied in marriage to the nearby earls of Carrick and Lennox, the steward was the most powerful Scottish magnate in the Clyde region after Alan. Whilst Alan's career declined, the climb of the steward's standing can be gauged with his reception of the office of Justiciar of Scotia and his continued consolidation of Cowal. (Note: Scotia referred to Scotland north of the Forth. By the end of William I's reign, the Scottish realm had been divided into three justiciarships: Scotia (the north), Lothian (much of the south), and Galloway (the south west).) Alexander, therefore, appears to have turned from Alan to Walter fitz Alan, entrusting the latter with the task of imposing royal authority further west into Argyll.

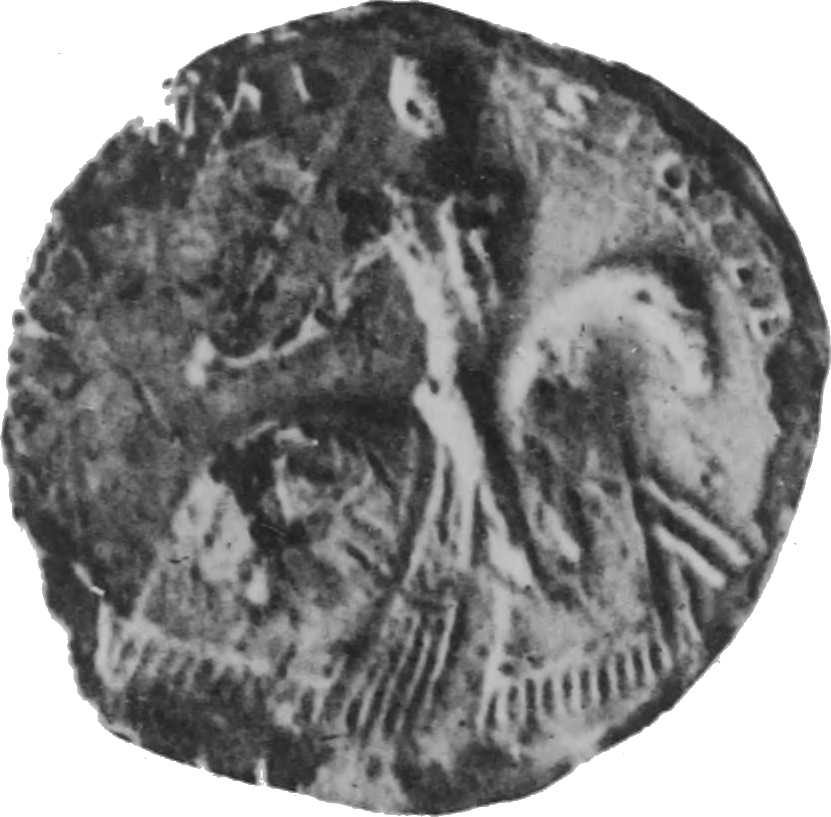
One of several seals known to have been utilised by Alan.

The sheer scale of the military resources at Alan's disposal was remarkable, as indicated by John's request of one thousand of Alan's best warriors, and by the sheer size of his galley-fleet of 1230–1231. As a native kindred of Gaelic heritage, Alan's family was remarkable for its religious foundations and endowments. Alan himself endowed St Andrew's Priory in Northampton, where his father was interred. In 1218, Alan founded Tongland Abbey, a Premonstratensian religious house in Galloway, He went on a pilgrimage to Canterbury in 1220, accompanied by Walter fitz Alan, and Robert de Brus, Lord of Annandale. There they observed the translation of the remains of St Thomas of Canterbury on 7 July, marking the martyred saint's jubilee. In fact, Alan's Morville ancestors were closely related to Hugh de Morville, one of the saint's killers, and this relationship may partly account for Alan's pious journey.

== Ancestry ==
Ancestors of Alan of Galloway

8. Fergus, Lord of Galloway (died 1161).
4. Uhtred, Lord of Galloway (died 1174)
9. name unknown, illegitimate.
2. Lochlann, Lord of Galloway (died 1200)
10. Waltheof, Lord of Allerdale (fl. 1101×1112)
5. Gunnild
11. Sigrid or Sigarith
1. Alan, Lord of Galloway (died 1234)
12. Hugh de Morville, Constable of Scotland (died 1162)
6. Richard de Morville, Constable of Scotland (died 1189/90)
13. Beatrice de Beauchamp
3. Helen de Morville (died 1217)
14. William of Lancaster, Lord of Kendal
7. Avicia (died 1191)

== Citations ==
Regnal titles
Preceded by Roland (Lochlann) of Galloway	Lord of Galloway; 1200–1234	Lordship partitioned
Other offices
Preceded by Roland (Lochlann) of Galloway	Constable of Scotland; 1200–1234	Succeeded by Roger de Quincy
