= William the Clerk of Normandy =

Norman cleric and Old French poet (fl. 1210–1238)

William the Clerk of Normandy (French: Guillaume le Clerc de Normandie) (fl. 1210/1211–1227/1238) was a Norman cleric and Old French poet. He is not the same person as the Scoto-Norman poet William the Clerk, who wrote the Roman de Fergus, sometimes wrongly attributed to the Norman.

William was married with a family. Both the Catholic Encyclopedia and the Oxford Dictionary of National Biography (ODB) maintains that he lived for a time in England, but it remains that he did not write in the Anglo-Norman dialect. He was originally from Normandy and his works suggest that he resided in the Diocese of Lichfield in England.

William authored "six religio-didactic works for lay audiences" (ODB). The oldest, dated to 1210 or 1211, and most popular—it survives in twenty manuscripts—is the Bestiaire divin ("Divine Bestiary"), a work of natural history and theology. It is dated on the basis of a reference to the sad state of the English Church in 1208. It contains many descriptions of animal life. It is dedicated to William's lord, a certain Radulphus, whose name is the object of an etymology given in the epilogue. Radulphus may be Ralph of Maidstone, who was treasurer of Lichfield in 1215. The Bestiaire was given several printings between the sixteenth and nineteenth centuries.

William's also wrote the Vie de Tobie for one William, prior of Kenilworth in Arden (1214–27), also in the diocese of Lichfield, and Les joies de notre Dame (or nostre Dame), which survives in only a single manuscript. The legendary Vie de Sainte Marie-Madeleine, a short biography of Mary Magdalene, belongs to an unknown date. The Besant de Dieu, an allegorical poem, William composed in 1226 or 1227. For this William drew on several recent events: the publication of De miseria conditionis humanae by Pope Innocent III, the Fourth Crusade, the interdict placed on England by Innocent in 1208–13, the Albigensian Crusade, and the Albigensian campaigns of Louis VIII of France. William also comments on the oppression of the peasantry by their rulers. William's last piece, Les treis moz de l'evesque de Lincoln, was written between 1227 and 1238 for Alexander Stavensby, the Bishop of Lichfield.

Several fabliaux have been erroneously assigned to William: Du prestre et d'Alison, La male honte, and La fille à la bourgeoise. There is no grounds for these ascriptions.
