= Thomas of Galloway (disambiguation) =

Thomas of Galloway (died 1231), (Tomás Mac Uchtraigh), was a Galwegian prince and warrior.

Thomas of Galloway may also refer to:

- Thomas of Galloway (died before 1234), legitimate son of Alan of Galloway
- Thomas of Galloway (bastard) (died after 1286), Tomás mac Ailein, bastard son of Alan of Galloway and claimant to the Galwegian throne
