= Henry, Earl of Atholl =

Earl of Atholl

Henry of Atholl ( - 1211), the son of Maol Choluim (Gd: Eanraig mac Mhaoil Chaluim), was Mormaer of Atholl, Scotland, from sometime in the 1190s until his death in 1211.

Henry had at least two daughters—Isabella and Forbhlaith. Isabella married Thomas, brother of the second-most important man in Scotland in this period, Alan, Lord of Galloway. Forbhlaith married Sir David de Hastings.

His illegitimate son, Conan, granted the monks of Lindores rights to gather birch and alder logs and hazel rods from his wood at Tulyhen near Blair Atholl.

== Bibliography ==
- Anderson, Alan Orr, Early Sources of Scottish History: AD 500-1286, Vol. II, (Edinburgh, 1922), p. 478, n. 8
- Roberts, John L., Lost Kingdoms: Celtic Scotland in the Middle Ages, (Edinburgh, 1997), pp. 54–5

Preceded by Máel Coluim	Mormaer of Atholl; 1190s–1211	Succeeded by Isabella
