= Thomas of Galloway =

Scottish prince and adventurer

- Tomás Mac Uchtraigh
- Born: Tomás m. Lochlainn m. Uchtraigh
- Died: 1231
- Resting place: Coupar Angus Abbey
- Known for: Activities in the Irish Sea region from 1212 to 1228
- Opponents: Aodh Méith; Hugh de Lacy
- Spouse: Isabella of Atholl, Countess of Atholl
- Children: Patrick, Alan
- Parent(s): Lochlann of Galloway & Helen de Morville
- Relatives: Alan of Galloway, Donnchadh of Carrick

Thomas of Galloway, known in Gaelic sources as Tomás Mac Uchtraigh (died 1231), was a Gall-Gaidhil prince and adventurer. The son of Lochlann, king of Galloway, Thomas was an active agent of his brother Alan of Galloway as well as the English and Scottish kings. When King John, the English monarch, decided that central and western Ulster were to be added to his dominions (with the earldom of Ulster already created by John de Courcy), he conscripted Thomas and Alan of Galloway to his aid, offering them much of later counties Antrim, Londonderry and Tyrone as incentive.

Thomas had begun his recorded career as a mercenary in Angevin service, and obtained much land in Ireland while gaining several victories with his fleet. In Scotland he obtained from William the Lion marriage to Isabella of Atholl, heiress to the province of Atholl in central Scotland. Although little is otherwise known about his life in Scotland, he was involved in the affairs of Coupar Angus Abbey, while much of his Irish activity coincided with and supported the interests of the Scottish ruling dynasty there in opposing the allies of the MacWilliams. He left one heir in Patrick, mormaer of Atholl, but the latter's premature death at the hands of the Bisset family meant that Thomas's line had failed by the 1240s.

== Background ==
Thomas was the son of Lochlann mac Uchtraigh [Roland fitz Uhtred] (died 1200), king of the Gall-Gaidhil, and the brother of Alan of Galloway [Ailean]. His mother was Helen de Morville (died 1217), daughter of Richard de Morville, Anglo-Norman lord of Cunninghame and Lauderdale.

Alan, being the elder son, became ruler of Galloway after Lochlann's death, and Thomas had to work with his brother and build a career elsewhere. The Gall-Gaidhil (modern Scottish Gaelic: Gall-Ghàidheil; Gallwedienses in Latin) were a Gaelic-speaking people in what is now south-western Scotland who gave their name to Galloway (Gall-Ghàidheillaib, "land of the Gall-Ghàidheil"), and were regarded neither as "Scottish" nor as "Irish" before the 13th century.

James Balfour Paul, early 20th-century historian of the nobility of Scotland, remarked that Thomas's activities are very poorly documented in the Scottish records compared with those elsewhere. Thomas first appears in English records early 1205, receiving gifts from John, King of England, perhaps as a reward for supplying John Galwegian galleys. Thomas assisted the English king in his Poitou campaign of 1205, and had perhaps been brought into John's service for this purpose.

Thomas temporarily acquired various estates and land rights in England—in Northumberland, Herefordshire, Worcestershire, and Warwickshire—though he no longer held these lands after 1209. Thomas appears to have raped someone at York in this era, an offence for which he received a royal pardon in 1212 at the request of the Scottish king William the Lion.

== Gall-Gaidhil warrior ==
Thomas made much of his career fighting in Ireland, starting from 1212 when, accompanied by sons of Raghnall mac Somhairle, he led a raid on the Cineál Eoghain city of Derry with seventy-six ships, sacking the city. In 1214, accompanied by Ruaidhrí mac Raghnaill, Thomas led another attack on Derry, sacking the city again and looting the church.

Tír Eoghain at the time had two rival kin-groups, the Inishowen-based Mac Lochlainn group and the Ó Néill based south of Sperrin Mountains. It is probable that the former were the main victims of Thomas's attack. Two years later, in 1216, Muireadhach mac Ailein, son of the mormaer of Lennox, defeated and killed the chief of an Inishowen group known as the Cineál Fearghusa, perhaps in support of Thomas's aims. During Thomas's 1212 raid on Derry, the men of Tír Conaill had simultaneously attacked the Cineál Eoghain in Inishowen.

Thomas's activities against Tír Eoghain may have been related to the attempts of the MacUilleim [MacWilliam] branch of the Scottish dynasty to gain the throne of Scotland. One of them, Gofraidh mac Domhnaill, had come from Ireland to Ross to renew a bid for the throne in 1211, and Thomas helped oppose him in the resultant royal campaign. There have been some connection between Meic Uilleim activities and Thomas's campaigns against Derry, with the Meic Uilleim perhaps being sheltered and supported by the Ó Néill, Aodh Méith.

Nonetheless, from 1210 King John had already set about trying to conquer Ulster west of the River Bann, and granted much of what are now counties Antrim, Londonderry and Tyrone to Thomas's brother Alan, the grant later being extended to include Thomas. Thomas himself was granted the core territories of Tír Eoghain in 1213, but the grant was "speculative" [Oram] and Thomas never became ruler of Tír Eoghain.

He did however, with English help, construct a castle at Coleraine, and the English appointed him keeper of the castle at Antrim in 1215. He appears to have travelled to England in 1219 in order to do homage to the new king of England, Henry III, but in 1221 was back in the region as he defeated and killed Diarmaid Ua Conchobhair, son of former Irish high king Ruaidhrí Ua Conchobhair; Diarmaid was returning to Ireland with a fleet he had raised in the Hebrides to help restore to the Connacht kingship the Ó Néill-backed anti-English Cathal Croibhdhearg Ó Conchobhair.

The Galloway lands in Ulster were threatened by Hugh de Lacy's return to the earldom of Ulster. The former earl of Ulster had previously fallen out of favour with the king, and suffered forfeiture. He returned to force his way back into power in Ulster and by 1227 had forced King Henry to acknowledge his claim to the earldom.

In the process Coleraine castle had been destroyed, and although they held on to much of their gains until at least 1226, it may be significant that when the castle at Coleraine was restored in 1228 it was by Earl Hugh and not Thomas. It is possible that Thomas's ability to manage his Irish possessions was hindered by his brother Alan's use of the Galwegian fleet to interfere in Manx succession disputes. As late as 1228 Thomas participated in Alan's invasion of the isle of Man, which installed Raghnall mac Gofraidh as king.

== Mormaer in Scotland ==
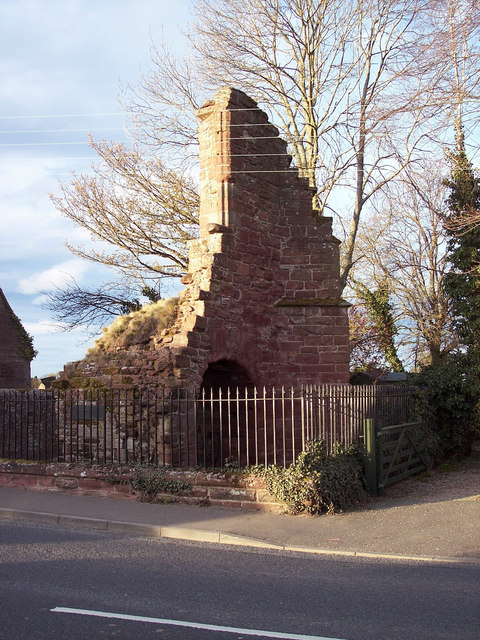
What remains of the gatehouse of Coupar Angus Abbey, the latter's only standing ruins today

Sometime before 1210 Thomas had been married to Isabella [Iseabail], daughter of Henry [Éinri], mormaer of Atholl, giving Thomas an interest in Scotland north of the Forth. Isabella was Henry's heiress, and subsequently succeeded to Atholl with Thomas taking the style of "Mormaer" or "Earl" in her name.

Thomas attended the coronation of the new Scottish king, Alexander II, at Scone on 6 December 1214. During the 1210s he confirmed and witnessed charters of Coupar Angus Abbey, and c. 1227 issues a confirmation to Dunfermline Abbey of its rights regarding the church of Moulin in Atholl.

The Chronicle of Melrose recorded Thomas's death in 1231, and noted that he was buried in the abbey of Coupar Angus. In July 1230 Thomas had been preparing ships as Henry III was planning an expedition to western France. It is possible that Thomas died in some kind of tournament accident, because in 1252 a vassal of the earl of Dunbar named Patrick, son of Constantine of Goswick, would receive a pardon for killing Thomas.

Countess Isabella subsequently married Alan Durward, but they had no sons (though may have had a daughter). Thomas left one son by his wife Isabella, Patrick [Padraig], who became mormaer of Atholl in 1242 after the death of his mother. Thomas also left at least one illegitimate son, Alan [Ailean].

Patrick was murdered the same year, probably by Walter Bisset of Aboyne, husband of Thomas's sister Ada. The Anglo-Norman Bissets had been active in Scotland for some years and were introduced to Ulster either by Hugh de Lacy or by the Galloway family, and were to control much of the Galloway's former Ulster lands in their place. It is likely that the murder was provoked by the disputed inheritance in Antrim, the Bissets subsequently securing their takeover of the Galloway Antrim lordship. Patrick was succeeded in Atholl by his aunt Forbhlaith.
