= Coleraine Castle =

Former castle in County Londonderry, Northern Ireland

Coordinates: 55.1325°N 6.6770°W

Coleraine Castle was a castle situated at Coleraine, County Londonderry, Northern Ireland.

The Annals of Ulster reports that the Earl of Atholl, Thomas fitz Roland, built the castle in 1214. It was later destroyed by Hugh de Lacy and the King of Tír Eoghain, Aodh Méith Ó Néill, as evidenced by the same source in 1223.

The Annals of Ulster also reports that Thomas reconstructed the castle in 1228. There is evidence to suggest that Thomas may not have been in any position to carry out reconstruction efforts. In 1225, he was owed an annuity of 100 marks in compensation for his Irish losses. In 1227, he declared that he had been impoverished through serving the English Crown in Ireland. If it wasn't Thomas was reconstructed Coleraine Castle, it is possible that Hugh did. However, the only record of Hugh operating in Thomas' lands occurs almost two decades later, in 1241.

== Citations ==
=== Primary sources ===
- "Annala Uladh: Annals of Ulster Otherwise Annala Senait, Annals of Senat". Corpus of Electronic Texts (28 January 2003 ed.). University College Cork. 2003.
- "Annala Uladh: Annals of Ulster Otherwise Annala Senait, Annals of Senat". Corpus of Electronic Texts (13 April 2005 ed.). University College Cork. 2005.

=== Secondary sources ===
- Bardon, J (2005) [1992]. A History of Ulster. Belfast: The Blackstaff Press. ISBN 0-85640-703-8. OL 8301730M.
- Brown, D (2016). Hugh de Lacy, First Earl of Ulster: Rising and Fall in Angevin Ireland. Irish Historical Monographs. Woodbridge: The Boydell Press. ISBN 978-1-78327-134-4. ISSN 1740-1097.
- Duffy, S (1993). Ireland and the Irish Sea Region, 1014–1318 (PhD thesis). Trinity College, Dublin. hdl:2262/77137.
- McNeill, TE (1983). "The Stone Castles of Northern County Antrim". Ulster Journal of Archaeology. 46: 101–128. ISSN 0082-7355. JSTOR 20567904.
- Oram, RD (2011). Domination and Lordship: Scotland 1070–1230. The New Edinburgh History of Scotland. Edinburgh: Edinburgh University Press. ISBN 978-0-7486-1496-7.
- Oram, RD (2013) [2012]. Alexander II, King of Scots, 1214–1249. Edinburgh: Birlinn. ISBN 978-1-907909-05-4.
- Orpen, GH (1920). Ireland Under the Normans. Vol. 3. Oxford: Clarendon Press.
- Stringer, KJ (1998) [1993]. "Periphery and Core in Thirteenth-Century Scotland: Alan Son of Roland, Lord of Galloway and Constable of Scotland". In Grant, A; Stringer, KJ (eds.). Medieval Scotland: Crown, Lordship and Community. Edinburgh: Edinburgh University Press. pp. 82–113. ISBN 0-7486-1110-X.
- Veach, C (2014). Lordship in Four Realms: The Lacy Family, 1166–1241. Manchester Medieval Studies. Manchester: Manchester University Press. ISBN 978-0-7190-8937-4.
