= David Hastings =

David Hastings may refer to:

- David Hastings (Passions), a character on the American soap opera Passions
- David Hastings (politician), American politician and lawyer from Maine
- David de Hastings, Earl of Atholl jure uxoris
