= Ada, Countess of Atholl =

13th-century English noblewoman

Ada
- Countess of Atholl
- Died: 25 December 1266
- Spouse: John de Strathbogie
- Issue: David Strathbogie, Earl of Atholl
- Father: David de Hastings
- Mother: Forbhlaith, Countess of Atholl

Ada, Countess of Atholl (c. 1221–25 December 1266), was the daughter and heir of Forbhlaith, Countess of Atholl and her husband, David de Hastings. Ada's mother, Forbhlaith, was herself heir of the highland mormaerdom of Atholl, Scotland. Ada was Countess of Atholl suo jure, she held the title in her own right, and not through her husband. She inherited the title from her mother, who was also suo jure Countess of Atholl. Upon her death the title went to her son, David of Strathbogie. David was the first of the Earls of Atholl to be named Strathbogie. David's father John was able to use the title of Earl but held it only by right of his wife, Ada, he was jure uxoris Earl of Atholl, as Ada's father had been.

Ada's husband, John de Strathbogie, was the son of David of Strathbogie and grandson of Duncan II, Earl of Fife. Together they were the progenitors of the Strathbogie dynasty of Atholl Earls, beginning with their son David of Strathbogie, 8th Earl of Atholl.

She died some time before 25 December 1266.

== See also ==
- Scotland in the High Middle Ages

Preceded by Forbhlaith with David de Hastings	Countess of Atholl ?-1264	Succeeded by David de Strathbogie
