= William the Clerk =

Old French poet

William the Clerk (French: Guillaume le Clerc) (fl. c. 1200 – c. 1240) was an Old French poet known only from the self-attribution at the end of the Arthurian Roman de Fergus, a parody of the romances of Chrétien de Troyes, notably the Conte du Graal.

William may have been a Scoto-Norman, but the two manuscripts that preserve the Roman are from northeastern France, perhaps suggesting their provenance there. It was once suggested to have been commissioned by Alan of Galloway for his wedding in 1209, since Alan was the descendant of Fergus, who ruled Galloway as king in the mid-twelfth century. Beate Schmolke-Hasselmann rejected this view and proposed that the Roman was commissioned by Dervorguilla, heiress of Galloway, and her husband, John I de Baliol, to promote the claim of their son, Hugh, to the Scottish throne, a claim derived from their ancestor Fergus Mor mac Eirc. This dates the work later than their marriage, which took place around 1223, and prior to John's death in 1268, most likely between 1237 and 1241.

D. D. R. Owen, adjudging the author to be intimately familiar with major figures and events of the reign of William the Lion in Scotland, posited as "a strong possibility" that William the Clerk is William Malveisin, a Frenchman who arrived in Scotland in the 1180s and served as a royal clerk. In this scenario, the Roman was composed after 1200.

Finally, William may be the William de Bois (de Bosco, de Bosch) who was a clerk of the royal chapel in 1193 and chancellor from 1210 to 1226.
