= David Strathbogie, Earl of Atholl =

Scottish noble (c. 1240–1255 – 1270)

- Born: c. 1240–1255
- Died: 6 August 1270; Tunis
- Spouse: Isabel of Chilham
- Issue: John of Strathbogie, 9th Earl of Atholl
- Father: John de Strathbogie
- Mother: Ada of Atholl

David Strathbogie (died 6 August 1270) was the first Strathbogie Earl of Atholl.

David was the son of John de Strathbogie and Ada of Atholl. David's mother, Ada, was suo jure Countess of Atholl, she held the title of countess in her own right, and upon her death, David succeeded her as Earl of Atholl.

He died at Tunis (or Carthage) in the Eighth Crusade, in the company of Louis IX of France, having married before June 1266, Isabel (d. 1292), daughter of Richard de Dover, feudal baron of Chilham, Kent, by his spouse Maud, suo jure Countess of Angus. In 1266, Isabel was heiress to her brother, Richard de Dover, by which she inherited the barony of Chilham, with the manor of Chingford Earls, Essex. In 1270, they leased the latter to the Knights Templar by licence from the king.

David was succeeded by his only son, John of Strathbogie, 9th Earl of Atholl, Warden and Justiciar of Scotland.

Preceded by Ada	Earl of Atholl; 1264–1269	Succeeded by John of Strathbogie
