= Isabella, Countess of Atholl =

Countess of Atholl

Isabella of Atholl was countess or ban-mormaer of Atholl, Scotland, from the death of her father Henry in 1211 until the accession of her son Padraig in 1236–7.

It has often been thought that, after the death of Thomas of Galloway in 1232, she married again, this time to the powerful political figure Alan Durward; this however, rests solely in the fact that Alan styles himself "Count of Atholl" in a few documents between 1233 and 1234. However, as Matthew Hammond has shown, this more is more likely to refer to fact that Alan, as a grandson of Máel Coluim, Earl of Atholl, probably sought to inherit the province.

== Bibliography ==
- Anderson, Alan Orr, Early Sources of Scottish History: AD 500-1286, Vol. II, (Edinburgh, 1922), p. 478, n. 8
- Hammond, Matthew H., "The Durward family in the thirteenth century", in Steve Boardman and Alasdair Ross (eds.), The Exercise of Power in Medieval Scotland, c.1200–1500, (Dublin/Portland, 2003), pp. 118–38
- Roberts, John L., Lost Kingdoms: Celtic Scotland in the Middle Ages, (Edinburgh, 1997), pp. 54–5

Preceded by Henry	Mormaer of Atholl; 1211 – 1236 or 1237	Succeeded by Padraig
