= Forbhlaith, Countess of Atholl =

Scottish noble

Forbhlaith (written also as Forflissa, Ferelith, Fernelith or Forueleth) was the latter of two heiresses of Atholl, the other being her sister Isabella. She married David de Hastings, a French knight who already possessed minor lands in Angus. They were, however, without a son when David died in 1247. They were succeeded by their daughter Ada.

Preceded by Patrick	Mormaer of Atholl; 1241-?	Succeeded by Ada m. John de Strathbogie
