= Roman de Fergus =

13th-century Arthurian romance

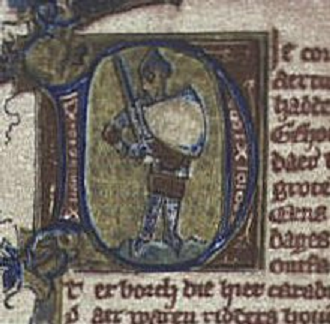
- Initial letter D: a knight standing on his feet holding a sword and a (white?) shield, in the 14th century (ca. 1330?) manuscript: Leiden, University Library, Ms. Letterkunde 191-1: Ferguut, a translation/adaptation of the Old French Arthurian romance Le Chevalier au Biel Escu, better known as the Roman de Fergus.
- Author(s): Guillaume le Clerc
- Language: Old French
- Date: early 13th century
- Genre: Chivalric romance
- Subject: Arthurian legend

The Roman de Fergus is an Arthurian romance written in Old French probably at the very beginning of the 13th century, by a very well educated author who named himself Guillaume le Clerc (William the Clerk). The main character is Fergus, the son of Soumilloit (a name corresponding to Sorley or Somerled; Scottish Gaelic: Somhairle), a rich but old-fashioned farmer and a noble Arthurian woman who rises to become the best knight of King Arthur.

== Historical background ==
If the Roman is based upon a historical figure, it is probably Fergus of Galloway. The Roman has been upheld by many modern critics for its highly sophisticated use of parody, parody directed at the whole genre of Arthurian romance. It had been suggested by earlier scholars such as Dominicia Legge that the work was produced under the patronage of Alan, Lord of Galloway, but this idea is now rejected by most scholars, for a variety of reasons, including the Roman's satirisation of Fergus (Alan's great-grandfather). Recently, it has been proposed by D.D.R. Owen that it was written for the entertainment of the Scottish court of William I, and that the author was none other than William Malveisin, a royal clerk who rose to hold both the Bishopric of Glasgow and St Andrews. Also noted by scholars is the Roman's extensive knowledge of the geography of southern Scotland, which is in general depicted in an exceedingly accurate manner. This is in contrast to most other works of the genre, in which geography is vague and unrealistic.

Some scholars hold that the Roman satirises native Scottish society. Soumilloit is wealthy enough to own a fortress, but he is low-born and the fortress is made only of wood. Moreover, his son Fergus works on the farm. Fergus' character is stumbling. Although valiant, he frequently transgresses the etiquette that the Francophone aristocratic society took for granted.

The Roman could be the first piece of non-Celtic vernacular literature to have survived from Scotland, an honour often thought to belong to The Brus of John Barbour, written one and a half centuries later in Middle English. It has been neglected in Scotland mainly because it did not come to the attention of scholars until relatively recently, being preserved only in Continental Europe. The other reason for neglect is probably that it was written in French, a linguistic-literary tradition which died out by the later Middle Ages. The Roman de Fergus however shows that, despite its future, French-culture flourished in Scotland during the High Middle Ages.

== Plot ==
The story begins with a stag hunt. Beginning in Carlisle, King Arthur and his knights chase a great white stag, which eludes them until Percival finally captures it in Galloway. At this point, Fergus, working the land in the service of his father, spots the knights and is inspired by them. Fergus persuades his father to give him a suit of armour, so that he can follow after the knights and join them. Fergus makes his way to Carlisle, killing two bandits on the way, whose heads he brings to the king. Arriving at court, he is mocked by Kay, the seneschal. Kay challenges Fergus to prove his worth by, among other things, defeating the king's bitter enemy, the Black Knight; Fergus accepts. After being taught knightly arts by the daughter of the royal Chamberlain, he is knighted by Arthur and receives encouragement and a sword from Percival and Gawain.

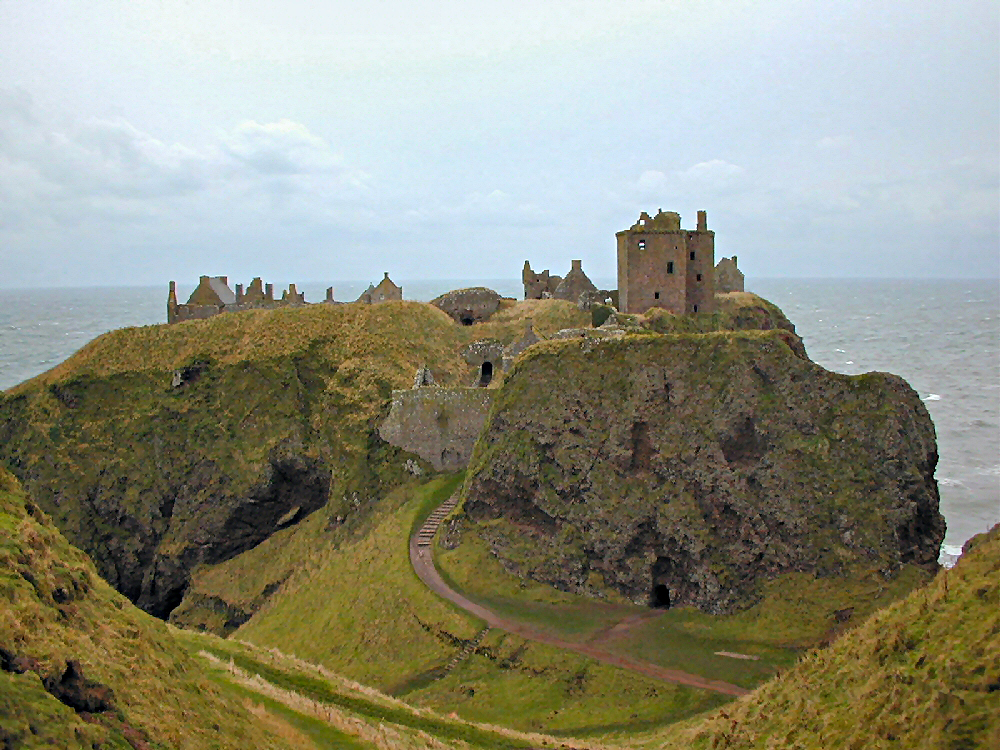
Dunnottar Castle in the Mearns occupies one of the finest fort-locations in Great Britain. The site is one of the most important locations in the Roman de Fergus.

Following his introduction to chivalry, Fergus makes his way to Liddel Castle, where he first encounters Galiene, the niece of the castellan. She declares her love for him, but he only promises to return after he has fulfilled his quest. Having vanquished the Black Knight, Fergus returns, only to find that Galiene has disappeared. At this point, the magic of love hits Fergus. He searches for her in vain for a year, until he meets a dwarf who tells him that he will retrieve his lost love if he can obtain a shield from a hag in Dunnottar Castle. With renewed hope, Fergus makes his way to Queensferry, to cross from "England" into "Scotland"; however, he gets into a dispute with the boatmen, dispatches them all, and is forced to sail himself over. Upon reaching Dunnotar, Fergus slays the guardian of the shield, and returns to Lothian. It is then that he is told that Galiene is the new ruler of Lothian, but is besieged in Roxburgh by a neighbouring king. On the way to Roxburgh, he is waylaid at Melrose by the husband of the hag-dragon he dispatched at Dunnottar. Emerging victorious, Fergus takes up residence in Melrose, and from there wreaks havoc on the army. He defeats some of its greatest knights, but this is not enough to lift the siege.

After a while, the king sends his nephew Arthofilaus to demand that Galiene surrender the castle. She refuses, but they agree that if she can find a suitable knight, they will settle the dispute by single combat. Galiene soon regrets the deal, as she is unable to find a willing candidate among her men. She therefore sends her attendant, Arondele, to request a knight from Arthur at Carlisle. However, Arthur is unable to provide one because all of his knights are out searching for Fergus. Dejected, Arondele heads back to her mistress. On the way, she passes Melrose and relates the story to Fergus, before returning to Roxburgh. News of the attendant's failure brings Galiene to grief, because the combat must take place the following day. When the time arrives, Galiene prepares to throw herself from the castle tower. However, she catches sight of a shining shield in the distance. The mysterious knight slays Arthofilaus, and the king gives up his claim to Lothian. It is then that Galiene learns the identity of the knight, her lost love Fergus. By then, however, he had already departed.

Back at Carlisle, King Arthur learns of the events and pardons the defeated king. Arthur decides personally to set out in search of Fergus, but Gawain counsels that he has a better chance of finding him if he hosts a tournament. The tournament is arranged at Jedburgh, and the prize is Queen Galiene and her kingdom. During the week-long tournament, Fergus remains invincible, defeating, among others, Kay, Lancelot and the Black Knight. It is after this that Fergus and Galiene are united in marriage, and Fergus becomes King of Lothian.

== Legacy ==
In the middle of the thirteenth century, the Roman was translated and adapted into Middle Dutch as the Roman van Ferguut. The first part of the Roman was translated from French fairly accurately, but the second part, possibly the work of another author, was much more loosely derived. The Ferguut today has wide fame as a Dutch classic, certainly more fame than the Roman de Fergus possesses in either Scotland or France. It has recently been translated into English by an American scholar.
