= Padraig, Earl of Atholl =

Murdered Scottish nobleman

Padraig or Patrick of Atholl was Mormaer of Atholl, from 1236/7 until 1241. The Chronicle of Melrose tells us that while he was lodging in Haddington, East Lothian, his enemies, "most wicked men," torched his lodging, killing both him and his two unknown companions. The chronicle had a high opinion of Padraig, and says that Padraig was "one imbued with all courtly wisdom and wit."

Padraig was succeeded by his aunt Forbhlaith, with her husband David de Hastings.

Consequent upon his murder the Scottish nobility, led by Patrick II Earl of March, exhorted by David de Hastings, pursued Walter Byset, Lord of Aboyne who sought protection from King Alexander II. Despite the king securing Walter in a number of safe houses he was eventually banished, with the loss of his estates, to England.

== Bibliography ==
- Anderson, Alan Orr, Early Sources of Scottish History: AD 500-1286, Vol. II, (Edinburgh, 1922), pp. 530–1

Preceded by Isabella	Mormaer of Atholl; 1236/7-1241	Succeeded by Forbhlaith
