= Máel Coluim, Earl of Atholl =

Mormaer of Atholl

Máel Coluim of Atholl was Mormaer of Atholl between 1153/59 and the 1190s.

The Chronicle of Holyrood tells us that in 1186 Máel Coluim had an outlaw called Adam mac Domnaill killed at the altar of a church in Coupar, and burned 58 of his associates inside the church. It is possible that this was a son of Domnall mac Uilleim, who claimed the Scottish throne and was revolting against King William I.

Máel Coluim is known to have granted the church of Moulin to the Benedictine monks of Dunfermline Abbey.

He was married twice. After his first marriage, he married Hextilda, the daughter of Uhtred of Tynedale, an Anglo-Saxon baron. He named his son and successor Henry, perhaps in honour of King Henry II of England. However, Hextilda had been married to Richard Comyn who was still alive well after Henry was born—so it is unlikely she was his mother.

== Bibliography ==
- Anderson, Alan Orr, Early Sources of Scottish History: AD 500-1286, 2 Vols (Edinburgh, 1922)
- McDonald, R. Andrew, Outlaws of Medieval Scotland: Challenges to the Canmore Kings, 1058-1266 (East Linton, 2003)

Preceded by Matad	Mormaer of Atholl; 1153/9-1190s	Succeeded by Henry
