= Roman van Ferguut =

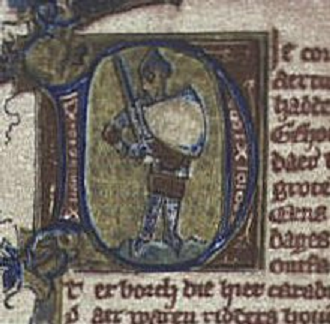
Picture of Fergus in a MS of Ferguut.

The Roman van Ferguut (English: Romance of Fergus) is a 13th-century Arthurian romance written in what is now called Middle Dutch (historically classified as [Low] German). The first part of the Roman was translated fairly accurately from the Scottish French language work known as the Roman de Fergus, but the second part, possibly the work of another author, was much more loosely derived. The Roman van Ferguut today has wide fame as a Dutch classic, certainly more fame than the Roman de Fergus possesses in either Scotland or France. The only manuscript of Ferguut is kept at Leiden University Libraries. A digital version is also available.

In 2000, it was translated into English by the American scholar David F Johnson.

== See also ==
- Fergus of Galloway
- Roman de Fergus
