= MacWilliam pretenders =

The Meic Uilleim (MacWilliams) were the Gaelic descendants of William fitz Duncan, grandson of Máel Coluim mac Donnchada, king of Scots. They were excluded from the succession by the descendants of Máel Coluim's son David I during the 12th century and raised a number of rebellions to vindicate their claims to the Mormaerdom of Moray and perhaps to the rule of Scotland.

== Background ==
William fitz Duncan himself appears to have been the acknowledged successor of Kings Alexander I and David I for part of their reigns. When David's son, Henry reached adulthood in the 1130s, William was replaced as heir apparent by Henry. In return, he appears to have been compensated with the extensive lands of Óengus, Mormaer of Moray, grandson of king Lulach, who was killed in battle against David I's general Edward the Constable in 1130. On William's death in 1147, his extensive lands in the south passed to his son by Alice de Rumilly, William of Egremont, while Moray was retained by the king.

Shortly after his death, William fitz Duncan's illegitimate son, Wimund, bishop of the Isles, attempted to gain his father's lands in Moray in a rebellion against David. He was bought off with lands in Cumbria rather than defeated outright, and was later captured, castrated and blinded by Cumbrians unhappy with his rule. Wimund, although now accepted to be a son of William fitz Duncan, is not counted among the Meic Uilleim.

It had been supposed that William's son Domnall mac Uilleim was illegitimate, but more recent histories accept that Domnall was a legitimate son of the prince, although not by Alice de Rumilly. The continuing support for the Meic Uilleim in Moray, together with their obviously Gaelic background, can best be explained by the assumption that Domnall's mother was a daughter of Óengus of Moray. Following modern historians, the Meic Uilleim were thus descended from Scots kings.

== The Meic Uilleim Rebellions ==
=== Domnall mac Uilleim ===
Although apparently the legitimate heir to Moray, Domnall did not receive the rule of the province from David on his father's death. The suggested reason is that Domnall would have been a child, and no suitable ruler for such a fractious and distant province. Domnall does not certainly appear in the record of events until the late 1170s, although it may be that he should be linked to disorders in Moray in the 1160s in the reign of Malcolm IV.

In 1179, King William and his brother Earl David took an army north to Ross, likely to deal with some threat from Domnall, or from Domnall and supporters. Two years later, Domnall was reported in Scotland with a large army. The focus of royal activity at this time was in Galloway, and it was not until Lochlann, Lord of Galloway was brought to an agreement with King William, by diplomacy rather than military success, that affairs in Moray and Ross could be settled.

By then, Domnall appears to have controlled much of the north, the royal castle at Auldearn and the new burgh there having been betrayed and destroyed respectively. An attempt by a royal army to deal with Domnall in 1187 appears to have been a failure, perhaps a farce, with the leaders quarreling among themselves because, as Roger of Howden reports, "some loved the king not at all". A second army, led by Lochlann of Galloway, defeated Domnall at the Battle of Mam Garvia suggested to be near Dingwall or in Moray.

=== Adam mac Domnaill ===
In 1186, a certain Adam son of Domnall, "the king's outlaw", was killed by Máel Coluim, Mormaer of Atholl, in the sanctuary of the church at Cupar, and the church burnt with 58 of Adam's associates within. It may be that this Adam mac Domnaill was a son of Domnall mac Uilleim. If this is so, then the presence of his son in Cupar, south of the Mounth, reinforces the conviction that Domnall fought, not for the Mormaerdom of Moray, but for the kingship of Scotland. However, his identification is not certain. One reading would give his name as Áed mac Domnaill, and it may be that he should be counted among the MacHeths, the sons of Áed.

=== Gofraid mac Domnaill ===
With the death of Domnall and Adam, the Meic Uilleim disappear for some years. In their place, Harald Maddadsson, Earl of Orkney, becomes the chief threat to the tenuous authority of King William in northern Scotland. However, in 1211, Gofraid (or Guthred), son of Domnall, came from Ireland to Ross, and raised a rebellion. King William led a great army north, but failed to bring Gofraid to decisive battle. Late in the year King William returned south, leaving Maol Choluim, Mormaer of Fife, as his lieutenant in Moray. Gofraid soon afterwards captured a royal castle, showing that he was far from being defeated.

The following year, Alexander (later Alexander II) son of King William, led an army north once more. King William followed with yet more soldiery, including mercenaries from Brabant supplied by King John of England. As it fell out, Gofraid's supporters betrayed him to William Comyn, Justiciar of Scotia, before battle was joined. Gofraid was executed on the King's orders.

Gofraid's revolt is said to have been a bloody affair, and although it was ended relatively quickly, it was, nonetheless, a serious threat to the aged King William.

=== Domnall Bán mac Domnaill ===
King William died in 1214, and was succeeded by Alexander. The new chief of the Meic Uilleim, Domnall Bán, brother of Gofraid, in company with Cináed, the chief of the MacHeths, and an unnamed Irish prince, launched another invasion. This failed quickly and completely, crushed by Ferchar mac in tSagairt, the future Mormaer of Ross, who killed the leaders and sent their heads to King Alexander.

=== Gille Escoib ===
The failure of the 1215 invasion and the death of Domnall Bán in no way ended the efforts of the MacWilliams to prosecute their claims to Moray and to the throne of Scotland. Gille Escoib (or Gillescop) Meic Uilleim and his sons were actively in rebellion in the 1220s. Gille Escoib's descent is nowhere stated, and he may have been a son of Domnall, or, more probably given his dates, a grandson. Walter Bower may be incorrect in dating Gille Escoib's rebellion to 1223, and it is more probably in the period around 1228 that his activities should be placed.

Gille Escoib's revolt, which probably began in 1228, ended in 1229, perhaps as Gofraid's had — in betrayal and execution — or perhaps defeated by William Comyn. The last remaining Meic Uilleim, an infant daughter of Gille Escoib or one of his sons, was put to death in 1229 or 1230:

[T]he same Mac-William's daughter, who had not long left her mother's womb, innocent as she was, was put to death, in the burgh of Forfar, in view of the market place, after a proclamation by the public crier. Her head was struck against the column of the market cross, and her brains dashed out.

It seems that by this time, the MacWilliams had concentrated their families and forces in the strongly defensible region between the Cairngorms and the Grey Mountains. With the defeat of Escoib's revolt, this region became Badenoch and was handed to the Comyn family, who thus became Lords of Badenoch.
