= Gofraid mac Domnaill =

Gofraid mac Domnaill (alternatively "Godfrey MacWilliam"; "Guthred"; "Guthred son of Macwilliam"), was a thirteenth-century Scottish rebel. The son of Domnall (modern; Donald), his father's surname was almost certainly MacWilliam (the modern spelling for the Gaelic Meic Uilleim family) though Bane has been proposed.

In 1211, Gofraid came from Ireland to Ross, and raised a rebellion. William I of Scotland led a great army north, but failed to bring Gofraid to decisive battle. Late in the year King William returned south, leaving Maol Choluim, Mormaer of Fife, as his lieutenant in Moray. Gofraid soon afterwards captured a royal castle, showing that he was far from being defeated.

The following year, Alexander (later Alexander II) son of King William, led an army north once more. King William followed with yet more soldiery, including mercenaries from Brabant supplied by King John of England. As it fell out, Gofraid's supporters betrayed him to William Comyn, Justiciar of Scotia (who at the time was Warden of Moray) before battle was joined. Gofraid was "beheaded [in] Kincardine 1211" (other sources specify 1212), by William Comyn, on the King's orders.

Gofraid's revolt is said to have been a bloody affair and, although it was ended relatively quickly, it was, nonetheless, a serious threat to the aged, unloved King William.

== Reading list ==
- Duncan, A.A.M., The Kingship of the Scots 842–1292: Succession and Independence. Edinburgh University Press, Edinburgh, 2002. ISBN 0-7486-1626-8
- McDonald, R. Andrew, Outlaws of Medieval Scotland: Challenges to the Canmore Kings, 1058–1266. Tuckwell Press, East Linton, 2003. ISBN 1-86232-236-8
