= Earl of Atholl =

Scottish title between 10th–17th centuries

Earldom of Atholl
- The Arms of the Realm and Ancient Local Principalities of Scotland
- Creation date: 12th century
- Peerage: Peerage of Scotland
- First holder: Dubdon of Atholl (Mormaerdom)
- Present holder: Bruce Murray, 12th Duke of Atholl
- Status: Extant as subsidiary title of Duke of Atholl
- Former seat: Blair Castle

The Mormaer or Earl of Atholl was the title of the holder of a medieval comital lordship straddling the highland province of Atholl (Ath Fodhla), now in northern Perthshire. Atholl is a special Mormaerdom, because a King of Atholl is reported from the Pictish period. The only other two Pictish kingdoms to be known from contemporary sources are Fortriu and Circinn. Indeed, the early 13th century document known to modern scholars as the de Situ Albanie repeats the claim that Atholl was an ancient Pictish kingdom. In the 11th century, the famous Crínán of Dunkeld may have performed the role of Mormaer.

Royal connections continued with Máel Muire, who was the son of King Donnchad I, and the younger brother of Máel Coluim III mac Donnchada. Matad was perhaps the most famous of the Mormaers, fathering Harald Maddadsson, a notorious rebel of the Scottish King and perhaps the first Gael to rule Orkney as Earl of Orkney. The line of Máel Muire and Crínán came to an end when Forbhlaith, the daughter of Mormaer Henry married David de Hastings.

The latter marriage produced a daughter, Ada, who married into the Strathbogie family, a semi-Normanized Gaelic family with Fife origins. The Strathbogies ruled until the Wars of Independence, when the Campells took over. It finally passed to the Stewarts.

== Early Mormaers/Earls of Atholl ==
- Dubdon (fl. 960s)
- Duncan II MacDonachadh 970s – 1010
- Crínán? (died 1045)
- ?
- Máel Muire, Earl of Atholl (fl. 1130s), son of Duncan I of Scotland
- Matad, Earl of Atholl (died 1151x1161), son of Máel Muire of Scotland
- Máel Coluim, Earl of Atholl (died 1190s), son of Matad, Earl of Atholl
- Henry, Earl of Atholl (died 1211) son of Máel Coluim, Earl of Atholl
- Isabella, Countess of Atholl
  - m. Thomas of Galloway (died 1232)
  - m. (?) Alan Durward
- Padraig, Earl of Atholl (died 1241)
- Forbhlaith, Countess of Atholl
  - m. David de Hastings
- Ada, Countess of Atholl (died 1264) m. John de Strathbogie
- David de Strathbogie, 8th Earl of Atholl (died 1270)
- John de Strathbogie, 9th Earl of Atholl (died 1306)
- David II Strathbogie, Earl of Atholl (died 1326) (forfeited)

After David II, two others of his name claimed the lordship, though neither exercised it:

  - David III Strathbogie, titular Earl of Atholl (died 1335)
  - David IV Strathbogie, titular Earl of Atholl (died 1369)

== Earls of Atholl; Second creation (1320) ==
- John Campbell, 1st Earl of Atholl (died 1333) inherited the property confiscated from David II Strathbogie in about 1320, but died without issue

== Earls of Atholl; Third creation (1341) ==
- William Douglas, 1st Earl of Atholl (died 1353) resigned his earldom upon or shortly after creation

== Earls of Atholl; Fourth creation (1342) ==
Other titles: Earl of Strathearn (1358, abd. 1369, regained 1370)

- Robert Stewart, 1st Earl of Atholl (1316–1390), grandson of Robert I, ceased to be Earl of Atholl in 1367, and later became King Robert II in 1371
- John Stewart, 2nd Earl of Atholl, his father resigned the title in favor of John on 31 May 1367; John later became King Robert III of Scotland in 1390.

== Earls of Atholl; Fifth creation (1398) ==
Other titles: Duke of Rothesay (1398) and Earl of Carrick (c. 1390)

- David Stewart, Duke of Rothesay, 1st Earl of Atholl (died 1402), grandson of Robert II, died without issue

== Earls of Atholl; Sixth creation (1403) ==
Other titles: Duke of Albany (1398), Earl of Fife (1371, res. 1372) and Earl of Buchan (1382, res. 1406)

- Robert Stewart, Duke of Albany, 1st Earl of Atholl (1340–1420), third son of Robert II, was created Earl of Atholl for the life of his brother (Robert III) only. He therefore lost the earldom upon the death of his brother in 1406.

== Earls of Atholl; Seventh creation (1404) ==
Other titles: Earl of Caithness (1375, abd c 1428–1430), Earl of Strathearn (1427 for life), Earl of Caithness (1430) and Baron Cortachy (1409)

- Walter Stewart, 1st Earl of Atholl (died 1437), sixth and youngest son of Robert II, was attainted (his honours forfeit) and executed for his part in the murder of James I

== Earls of Atholl; Eighth creation (1457) ==
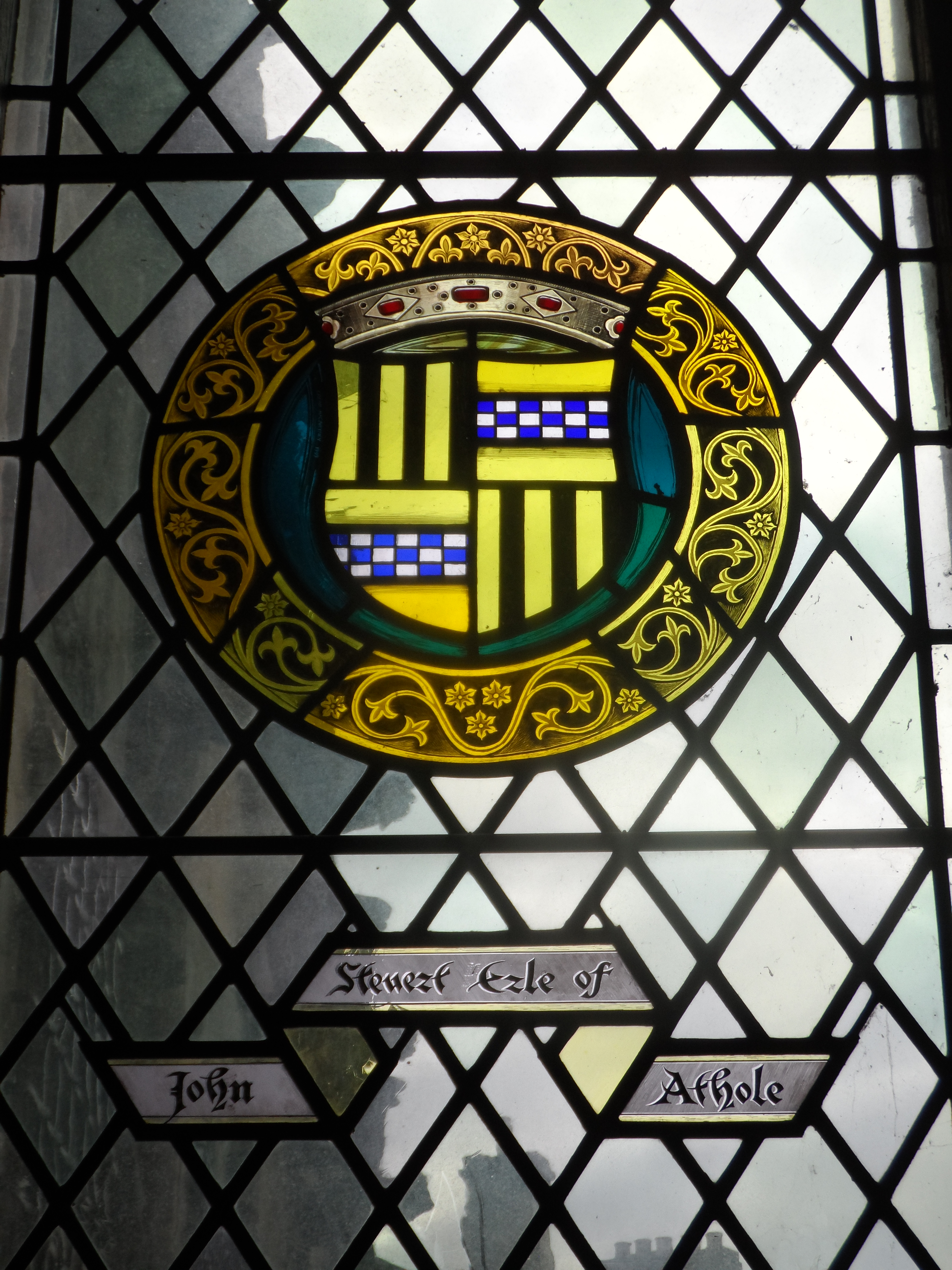
Arms of the Stewart Earls of Atholl, in stained glass at Stirling Castle

Other titles: Lord of Balveny (1460)

- John Stewart, 1st Earl of Atholl (1440–1512) (a half-brother of James II (from a different Stewart family))
- John Stewart, 2nd Earl of Atholl (died 1521), only son of the 1st Earl
- John Stewart, 3rd Earl of Atholl (1507–1542), only son of the 2nd Earl
- John Stewart, 4th Earl of Atholl (died 1579), only son of the 3rd Earl
- John Stewart, 5th Earl of Atholl (1563–1595), only son of the 4th Earl, died without male issue.

== Earls of Atholl; Ninth creation (1596) ==
Other titles: Lord Innermeath (1469)

- John Stewart, 1st Earl of Atholl (1566–1603) (only son of the 5th Lord Innermeath)
- James Stewart, 2nd Earl of Atholl (died 1625) (only son of the 1st Earl, died without issue and both titles became extinct)

== Earls of Atholl; Tenth creation (1629) ==
- John Murray, 1st Earl of Atholl (c1605-1642) (son of William Murray, 2nd Earl of Tullibardine and grandson of the 5th Earl of Atholl via his mother)
- John Murray, 3rd Earl of Tullibardine, 2nd Earl of Atholl (1631–1703) (elder son of the 1st Earl; became 2nd Earl of Atholl in 1642, 3rd Earl of Tullibardine in 1670, and created Marquess of Atholl in 1676)
- John Murray, 2nd Marquess of Atholl (1660–1724) (eldest son of the 1st Marquess; created Duke of Atholl in 1703)

Family tree of Dukes, Marquesses, and Earls of Atholl, Earls of Derby (3rd Stanley family creation), and Earls of Dunmore

John Lestrange III d. 1269
Baron Strange (1st creation), of Salop, 1295
John Lestrange IV d. 1276	Roger le Strange d. 1311; 1st Baron Strange of Salop
Baron Strange (1st creation), of Salop extinct, 1311
Baron Strange (2nd creation), of Knockyn, 1295
John Le Strange V d. 1309; 1st Baron Strange of Knockyn
Baron Mohun of Dunster, 1299
John Le Strange VI c. 1282–1311; 2nd Baron Strange of Knockyn	John de Mohun d. 1330; 1st Baron Mohun
John Le Strange c. 1297–1323; 3rd Baron Strange of Knockyn	Roger Le Strange; 1301–1349; 4th Baron Strange of Knockyn	John de Mohun d. 1322
Earl of Atholl (4th creation), 1367
Roger Le Strange c. 1327–1382; 5th Baron Strange of Knockyn	John Mohun; 1320–1376; 2nd Baron Mohun	Robert Stewart; 1316–1390; 1st Earl of Atholl, Earl of Strathearn, Later King Robert II
Earl of Atholl (6th creation), 1403	Earl of Atholl (7th creation), 1404
John Beaufort c. 1373–1410; Earl of Somerset	John Le Strange c. 1350–1397; 6th Baron Strange of Knockyn	Maud Mohun	John Stewart c. 1337–1406; 2nd Earl of Atholl, Earl of Carrick, Later King Robert III	Robert Stewart; 1340–1420; Duke of Albany, Earl of Atholl	Walter Stewart c. 1360–1437; Earl of Atholl, Earl of Strathearn, Earl of Caithness
Earldom of Atholl (4th creation) merged in the crown, 1390	Earldom of Atholl (6th creation) expired, 1406	Earldom of Atholl (7th creation) attainted, 1404
Baron Stanley, 1456	Earl of Atholl (5th creation), 1398
John Beaufort; 1401–1444; Duke of Somerset	Thomas Stanley c. 1405–1459; 1st Baron Stanley, King of Mann	Richard Le Strange; 1381–1449; 7th Baron Strange of Knockyn, 3rd Baron Mohun	James Stewart "Black Knight of Lorn"; 1399–c. 1451	Joan Beaufort c. 1404–1445	James I 1394–1437; King of Scots	David Stewart; 1378–1402; Duke of Rothesay, Earl of Atholl, Earl of Carrick
Earldom of Atholl (5th creation) extinct, 1402
Earl of Derby (3rd creation), 1485	Earl of Atholl (8th creation), c. 1457; Lord of Balveny, 1460
Margaret Beaufort; 1443–1509	Thomas Stanley; 1435–1504; 1st Earl of Derby, 2nd Baron Stanley, King of Mann	John Le Strange c. 1440–1477; 8th Baron Strange of Knockyn	John Stewart c. 1437–1442–1512; 1st Earl of Atholl
Henry VII; 1457–1509	George Stanley; 1460–1503; 9th Baron Strange of Knockyn suo uxoris	Joan Le Strange c. 1460–1514; 9th Baroness Strange of Knockyn suo jure	John Stewart c. 1480–c. 1521; 2nd Earl of Atholl
Mary Tudor; 1496–1533	Thomas Stanley; 1504–1521; 2nd Earl of Derby, 10th Baron Strange of Knockyn, 3rd Baron Stanley, King of Mann	John Stewart; 1507–1542; 3rd Earl of Atholl
Eleanor Brandon; 1519–1547	Edward Stanley c. 1509–1572; 3rd Earl of Derby, 11th Baron Strange of Knockyn, 4th Baron Stanley, Lord of Mann	John Stewart "the fair" d. 1579; 4th Earl of Atholl
Earl of Atholl (9th creation), 1596	Lord Murray of Tullibardine, 1604, Earl of Tullibardine (1st creation) and Lord Murray, Gask and Balquhidder, 1606
Margaret Clifford; 1540–1596	Henry Stanley; 1531–1593; 4th Earl of Derby, 12th Baron Strange of Knockyn, 5th Baron Stanley, Lord of Mann	John Stewart; 1566–1603; 1st Earl of Atholl, 6th Lord Innermeath	Marie Ruthven (d. after 1605)	John Stewart; 1563–1595; 5th Earl of Atholl	John Murray (c. 1550 – c. 1609); 1st Earl of Tullibardine, etc.
Earldom of Atholl (8th creation) extinct, 1595
Earl of Tullibardine (2nd creation), 1628
Ferdinando Stanley; 1559–1594; 5th Earl of Derby, 13th Baron Strange of Knockyn, 6th Baron Stanley, Lord of Mann	William Stanley; 1561–1642; 6th Earl of Derby, Lord of Mann	James Stewart d. 1625; 2nd Earl of Atholl	Dorothea Stewart	William Murray c. 1574–1627; 2nd Earl of Tullibardine, etc.	Patrick Murray; 1578–1644; 1st Earl of Tullibardine, etc.
Barony of Strange of Knockyn (9th creation) abeyant, 1594	Earldom of Atholl (9th creation) extinct, 1625	Resigned Earldom of Tullibardine and lordships in favour of his brother, 1626
Elizabeth Stanley; 1588–1633
Baron Strange (4th creation), 1628	Earl of Atholl (10th creation), 1629
Ferdinando Hastings; 1608–1655; 6th Earl of Huntingdon and Baron Hastings	James Stanley; 1607–1651; 7th Earl of Derby, 1st Baron Strange (4th creation)	John Murray c. 1610–1642; 1st Earl of Atholl	James Murray; 1617–1670; 2nd Earl of Tullibardine, etc.
Marquess of Atholl, Viscount of Balquhidder, and Lord Murray, Balveny and Gask, 1676
Charles Stanley; 1628–1672; 8th Earl of Derby, 2nd Baron Strange (4th creation)	Amelia Ann Sophia Stanley; 1633–1702/03	John Murray; 1631–1703; 1st Marquess of Atholl, etc., 2nd Earl of Atholl, 3rd Earl of Tullibardine, etc.
Earl of Tullibardine, Viscount Glenalmond and Lord Murray, 1696 (for life); Duke of Atholl, Marquess of Tullibardine, Earl of Strathtay and Strathardle, Viscount of Balwhidder, Glenalmond and Glenlyon, Lord Murray, Balveny and Gask, 1703	Earl of Dunmore, Viscount of Fincastle, Lord Murray of Blair, Moulin and Tillimet, 1686
Theophilus Hastings; 1650–1701; 7th Earl of Huntingdon and Baron Hastings	William Richard George Stanley c. 1655–1702; 9th Earl of Derby, 3rd Baron Strange (4th creation)	James Stanley; 1664–1736; 10th Earl of Derby, 6th Baron Strange (4th creation)	John Murray; 1660–1724; 1st Duke of Atholl, etc., 2nd Marquess of Atholl, etc., Earl of Tullibardine and Viscount Glenalmond and Lord Murray	Charles Murray; 1661–1710; 1st Earl of Dunmore, etc.
Theophilus Hastings; 1696–1747; 9th Earl of Huntingdon and Baron Hastings	Henrietta Stanley; 1687–1718; 4th Baroness Strange (4th creation)	William Murray; 1689–1746 styled Marquess of Tullibardine	James Murray; 1690–1764; 2nd Duke of Atholl, etc., 7th Baron Strange (4th creation)	George Murray; 1694–1760	John Murray; 1685–1752; 2nd Earl of Dunmore, etc.	William Murray; 1696–1756; 3rd Earl of Dunmore, etc.
Attainted and excluded from succession	Attainted and excluded from succession
Elizabeth Rawdon; 1731–1808; 16th Baroness Botreaux, 15th Baroness Hungerford, 13th Baroness de Moleyns, 13th Baroness Hastings	John Rawdon; 1720–1793; 1st Earl of Moira, 2nd Baron Rawdon, 4th Rawdon Baronet	Henrietta Ashburnham c. 1716–1732; 5th Baroness Strange (4th creation)	Charlotte Murray; 1731–1805; 8th Baroness Strange (4th creation)	John Murray; 1729–1774; 3rd Duke of Atholl	John Murray; 1730–1809; 4th Earl of Dunmore, etc.
Earl Strange and Baron Murray of Stanley, 1786	Baron Dunmore, 1831
Francis Rawdon-Hastings; 1754–1826; 1st Marquess of Hastings, 2nd Earl of Moira, 3rd Baron Rawdon, 5th Rawdon Baronet	Flora Mure-Campbell; 1780–1840; 6th Countess of Loudoun	John Murray; 1755–1830; 4th Duke of Atholl, etc., 1st Earl Strange, etc., 9th Baron Strange (4th creation)	George Murray; 1761–1803	George Murray; 1762–1836; 5th Earl of Dunmore, etc., 1st Baron Dunmore	Alexander Murray; 1764–1842
Baron Glenlyon
George Augustus Francis Rawdon-Hastings; 1808–1844; 2nd Marquess of Hastings; 3rd Earl of Moira; Earl of Rawdon, 4th Baron Rawdon	Barbara Rawdon-Hastings; 1810–1858; 20th Baroness Grey de Ruthyn	Charlotte Murray; 1775–1832 m. Adam Drummond of Megginch	John Murray; 1778–1846; 5th Duke of Atholl, etc., 2nd Earl Strange, etc., 10th Baron Strange (4th creation)	James Murray; 1782–1837; 1st Baron Glenlyon	George Murray; 1784–1860
Edith Maud Rawdon-Hastings; 1833–1874; 10th Countess of Loudoun	John Drummond; 1803–1889	George Augustus Frederick John Murray; 1814–1864; 6th Duke of Atholl, etc., 3rd Earl Strange, etc., 11th Baron Strange (4th creation), 2nd Baron Glenlyon	George Edward Murray; 1818–1854	Alexander Edward Murray; 1804–1845; 6th Earl of Dunmore, etc., 2nd Baron Dunmore	Virginius Murray; 1817–1861
Paulyn Francis Cuthbert Rawdon-Hastings; 1856–1907	Malcolm Drummond; 1856–1924	John James Hugh Henry Stewart-Murray; 1840–1917; 7th Duke of Atholl, etc., 4th Earl Strange, etc., 12th Baron Strange (4th creation), 3rd Baron Glenlyon	George Herbert Murray; 1849–1936	Douglas Stuart Murray; 1853–1920	Charles Adolphus Murray; 1841–1907; 7th Earl of Dunmore, etc., 3rd Baron Dunmore	Reginald Murray; 1846–1925
Baron Stanley abeyance ended, 1921	Baron Strange of Knockyn abeyance ended, 1921
Edith Abney-Hastings; 1883–1960; 12th Countess of Loudoun; Baroness Botreaux, Baroness Hastings, 7th Baroness Stanley	Elizabeth Philipps Abney-Hastings; 1884–1974; 22nd Baroness Hungerford, 20th Baroness de Moleyns, 14th Baroness Strange of Knockyn	John George Stewart-Murray; 1871–1942; 8th Duke of Atholl, etc., 5th Earl Strange, etc., 13th Baron Strange (4th creation), 4th Baron Glenlyon	James Thomas Stewart-Murray; 1879–1957; 9th Duke of Atholl, etc., 6th Earl Strange, etc., 14th Baron Strange (4th creation), 5th Baron Glenlyon	George Evelyn Pemberton Murray; 1880–1947	George Murray; 1884–1940	Alexander Edward Murray; 1871–1962; 8th Earl of Dunmore, etc., 4th Baron Dunmore	Arthur Charles Murray; 1882–1964
Earldom of Strange and Baronies of Murray and Glenlyon extinct and Barony of Strange abeyant, 1957
Baron Strange (4th creation) abeyance terminated, 1965
Jestyn Reginald Austin Plantagenet Philipps; 1917–1991; 2nd Viscount St Davids, 23rd Baron Hungerford, 21st Baron de Moleyns, 15th Baron Strange of Knockyn	John Drummond; 1900–1982; 15th Baron Strange (4th creation)	George Anthony Murray; 1907–1945	Edward David Murray; 1908–1940 styled Viscount Fincastle	Reginald Arthur Murray; 1911–1981; 10th Earl of Dunmore, etc.	Kenneth Randolph Murray; 1913–1995; 11th Earl of Dunmore, etc.
Baron Strange (4th creation) abeyant, 1982–1986
Colwyn Iestyn John Philipps; 1939–2009; 3rd Viscount St Davids, 24th Baron Hungerford, 22nd Baron de Moleyns, 16th Baron Strange of Knockyn	Jean Cherry Drummond; 1928–2008; 16th Baroness Strange (4th creation)	George Iain Murray; 1931–1996; 10th Duke of Atholl, etc.	John Murray; 1929–2012; 11th Duke of Atholl, etc.	John Alexander Murray; 1939–1980; 9th Earl of Dunmore, etc., 5th Baron Dunmore
Barony Dunmore extinct, 1980
Rhodri Colwyn Philipps b. 1966; 4th Viscount St Davids, 25th Baron Hungerford, 23rd Baron de Moleyns, 17th Baron Strange of Knockyn	Roland Augusto Jestyn Estanislao Philipps b. 1970	Adam Humphrey Drummond b. 1953; 17th Baron Strange (4th creation)	Bruce George Ronald Murray b. 1960; 12th Duke of Atholl, etc.	Malcolm Kenneth Murray b. 1946; 12th Earl of Dunmore, etc.	Geoffrey Charles Murray b. 1949
Heir presumptive to the Viscouncy St Davids, Barony Hungerford, Barony de Moleyns, and Barony of Strange of Knockyn	Heir presumptive to the Earldom of Dunmore
John Adam Humphrey Drummond b. 1992	Michael Bruce John Murray b. 1985 styled Marquess of Tullibardine	David Nicholas George Murray b. 1986
Heir apparent to the Barony of Strange (4th creation)	Heir apparent to the Dukedom of Atholl

== See also ==
- Clan Murray
- Atholl
