= David de Hastings =

12th-13th century English noble

- jure uxoris Earl of Atholl
- Died: 1247
- Spouse: Forbhlaith, Countess of Atholl
- Issue: Ada
- Father: John de Hastings

David de Hastings (or David Hastings) (c. 1190 – 1247 or 1269), jure uxoris Earl of Atholl, was a Norman knight who possessed minor lands in Angus.

He was son of John de Hastings (c. 1160 – fl. 25 July 1210) of Dun, Angus, Scotland.

Some time before or in 1242 he married Forbhlaith, Countess of Atholl, daughter of Henry, 3rd Earl of Atholl and Margaret. In 1242 he is recorded with the style Earl of Atholl jure uxoris.

Having no male heir, David and Fernelith were succeeded by their daughter Ada.
