= Jose Francisco =

Jose Francisco may refer to:

- José Francisco Altur (born 1968), Spanish tennis coach and former professional player
- José Francisco Álvarez (1796–1841), Argentine lawyer, military, and politician
- José Francisco Barrundia (1787–1854), Central American politician
- Jose Francisco Benitez (born 1969), Filipino politician and academic
- José Francisco Bermúdez (1782–1831), Venezuelan revolutionary and military officer
- José Francisco Borges (1935–2024), Brazilian folk poet and woodcut artist
- José Francisco Calí Tzay (born 1961), Guatemalan attorney and diplomat
- José Francisco Cardenal (born 1940), Nicaraguan businessman
- José Francisco Chaves (1833–1904), American military leader, politician, lawyer, and rancher
- José Francisco Coronato Rodríguez (born 1953), Mexican politician and lawyer
- José Francisco da Terra Brum, 2nd Baron of Alagoa (1809–1844), Portuguese son of José da Terra Brum, 1st Baron of Alagoa
- José Francisco de Isla (1703–1781), Spanish Jesuit, preacher, humorist, and satirist
- José Francisco del Montenegro (1790–1851), Nicaraguan politician
- José Francisco de Morais (1948–1999), Brazilian footballer
- José Francisco de Paula Señan (1760–1823), Spanish missionary to the Americas
- José Francisco de Peralta (1786–1844), Costa Rican priest and politician
- José Francisco Fuentes (c. 1966–2009), Mexican politician
- José Francisco Gallardo Rodríguez (1946–2021), Mexican military general and academic
- José Francisco Gana (1791–1864), Chilean military officer and politician
- José Francisco Gana Castro (1828–1894), Chilean government minister and army general
- José Francisco González (born 1971), Venezuelan football manager and former player
- José Francisco Guerra (born 1968), Spanish fencer
- José Francisco Jarque (born 1971), Spanish cyclist
- José Francisco Landero (born 1971), Mexican politician
- José Francisco Lemus, Cuban revolutionary and businessman
- José Francisco Madero (?–1833), Mexican surveyor and land commissioner
- José Francisco Mañuz (born 1960), Spanish retired footballer
- José Francisco Merino (born 1952), El Salvador politician
- José Francisco Miguel António de Mendonça (1725–1808), Portuguese cardinal
- José Francisco Molina (born 1970), Spanish former professional footballer
- José Francisco Montes (1830–1888), Honduran president
- José Francisco Moreira dos Santos (1928–2023), Portuguese Roman Catholic bishop
- José Francisco Nava (born 1983), Chilean former pole vaulter
- Jose Francisco Oliveros (1946–2018), Filipino Roman Catholic prelate
- José Francisco Ortega (1734–1798), New Spanish soldier and early settler of Alta California
- José Francisco Pacheco (born 1951), Portuguese educator
- José Francisco Peña Gómez (1937–1998), Dominican Republic politician
- José Francisco Peña Guaba (born 1963), Dominican Republic politician and diplomat
- José Francisco Rábago (born 1940), Mexican politician
- José Francisco Reinoso (born 1950), Cuban retired footballer
- José Francisco Rodrigues, real name of Jose Rod de Parra (1938–2014), Indian comedian, actor, singer, and playwright
- José Francisco Ruiz (1783–1840), Spanish soldier, educator, politician, Republic of Texas Senator, and revolutionary
- José Francisco Ruiz Massieu (1946–1994), Mexican political figure
- José Francisco Salgado, Puerto Rican astronomer, experimental photographer, visual artist, and public speaker
- Jose Francisco Syquia, Filipino Roman Catholic exorcist
- José Francisco Torres (born 1987), American professional soccer player
- José Francisco Ugarteche (1768–1834), Paraguayan jurist and politician
- José Francisco Ulloa (born 1940), Costa Rican priest and bishop
- José Francisco Urrejola (1881–1946), Chilean politician and lawyer
- José Francisco Valiente (1911–1988), Salvadoran politician
- José Francisco Vergara (1833–1889), Chilean politician, war hero, cavalry commander, presidential candidate, engineer, and journalist
- José Francisco Xavier de Salazar y Mendoza (1750–1802), New Spain portrait painter
