= Gruuthuse =

Nobel family Tribes of Bruges

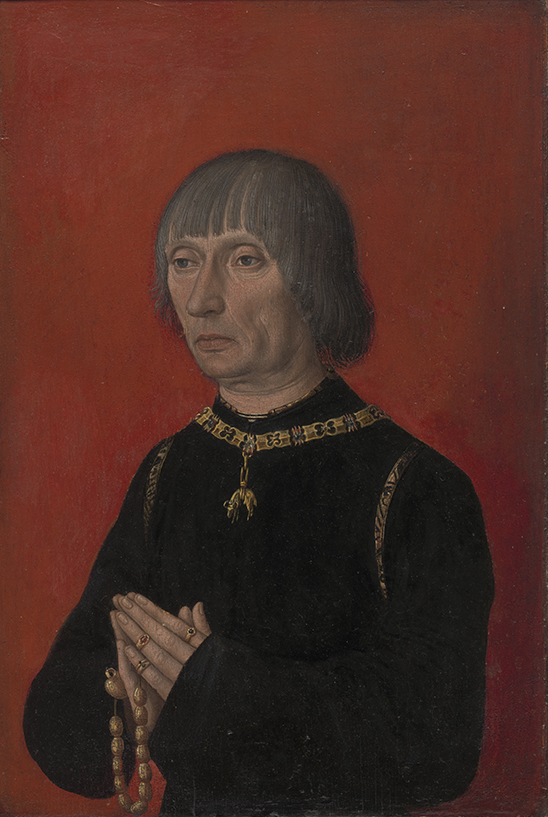
Lodewijk van Gruuthuse, wearing the Collar of the Order of the Golden Fleece. Portrait by the Master of the princely portraits, Groeningemuseum, Bruges

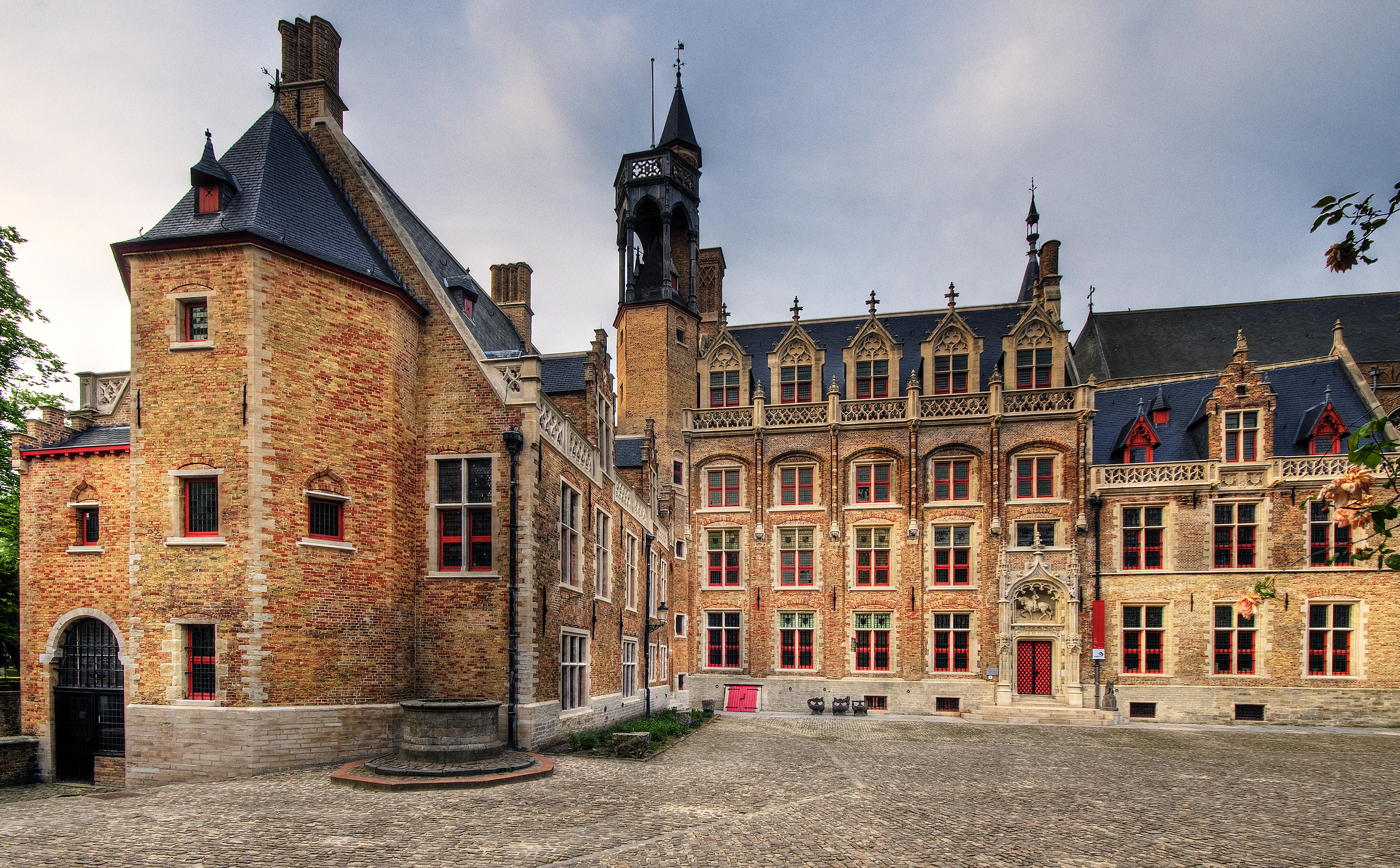
The Gruuthuse House, now museum, in Bruges

The lords of Gruuthuse (Heren van Gruuthuse, also Gruythuyse; also "lords of Bruges", Heren van Brugge) were one of the noble families of Bruges in the medieval period. It was one of several families bearing the title of "lords of Bruges" (Heren van Brugge) Their heraldic motto was Plus est en vous – Meer is in u ("there is more in you").

The family emerges in the 13th century, and its male line is extinct in 1572. Its most notable member was Lodewijk van Gruuthuse (1422 – 1492). They held several titles like Lord of Gruuthuse, Prince of Steenhuijs and Earl of Winchester.

== Genealogy ==
- Lambert van Brugge en van Gruuthuse (c. 1190 – c. 1255)
- Geldolf I van Brugge en van Gruuthuse (c. 1215/20 – c. 1269) x Margareta van Gistel
- Geldolf II van Brugge en van Gruuthuse (c. 1240 – c. 1300) x Gertrude van Assche
- Geldolf III van Brugge en van Gruuthuse (1265/70 – c. 1335)

With Geldolf III, the male line of the family was extinct; however, a daughter of Geldolf II, Catharina (or Maria, or Anna) van Brugge (1265/70 – c. 1320) married one van der Aa, likely Geerard van der Aa, lord of Grimbergen (1260–1310), and her heirs continued to bear the van Gruuthuse name, alongside the van der Aa one.

- Jan I van Gruuthuse en van der Aa (1290/1295 – c. 1360) x 1) Catharina van Steelant 2) Margaretha van Dudzele
- Jan II van Gruuthuse en van der Aa (1335/40 – c. 1400) x Isabelle de Looz Agimont
- Jan III van Gruuthuse en van der Aa (c. 1368/69 – before 1420) x Agnès de Mortaigne, vrouw van Spiere, widow of Gerard van Halewyn
- Jan IV van Gruuthuse en van Brugge (c. 1390 – c. 1440) x Margareta van Steenhuyse, vrouw van Avelgem
- Jacob van Brugge, brother of Lodewijk (c. 1418 - 1472/4) x Sancha Rodriguez d'Arce.
- Lodewijk van Gruuthuse (1422 – 1492) x Margareta van Borselen (d. 1510)
- Jan V van Gruuthuse (d. Abbeville 1522) x 1) Marie d'Auxy, 2) Renée de Bueil, 3) Marie de Melun
- René van Gruuthuse (d. 1572), last of the male line x 1) Beatrice de la Chambre, 2) Marie de Nearvi

== See also ==
- Gruuthuse manuscript

== Literature ==
- Sanderus, Flandria Illustrata, ed. 1641, t. I, p. 197
- Joseph-Basile van Praet, Recherches sur Louis de Bruges, seigneur de Gruuthuse, Parijs, 1831
- F. van Dycke, Recueil héraldique de familles nobles et patriciennes de la Ville et du Franconat de Bruges, Brugge, 1851
- Armand de Behault de Dornon, Etudes sur les Seigneurs de Gruuthuse, in: Handelingen van het genootschap voor geschiedenis te Brugge, 1928, 5-24
- Alphonse Wauters Les seigneurs de la Gruythuyse, in: Biographie Nationale de Belgique, Tome VIII, Brussel, 1885, col. 381–390
- Andries van den Abeele, Het enigma van de genealogie Gruuthuse: veel vragen en enkele antwoorden, in: Vlaamse Stam, November 2007, 621–629.
