= Love song =

Type of song dealing with love

A love song is a song about love, falling in love, heartbreak after a breakup, and the feelings that these experiences bring. Love songs can be found in a variety of different music genres. They can come in various formats, from sad and emotional pieces to fast songs that only have a faint love theme and major on the sound and popularity.

== History ==
Love songs have existed for many years and can be found in the histories and cultures of most societies, though their ubiquity is a modern phenomenon.

The oldest known love song is the love song of Shu-Sin, which was discovered in the library of Ashurbanipal in Mesopotamia. It was about both romantic and erotic love. Prior to the discovery of the love song of Shu-Sin, Solomon's Song of Songs from the Bible was considered the oldest love song.

== Early history ==
There are several theories about the origin of music in a general sense. According to Charles Darwin, it has to do with the choice of partner between woman and man (women choose male partners based on musical performances), and so the first music would be love music. However, Herbert Spencer saw music develop from a passionate eloquence, and music arise as an expression of emotions.

In Ancient Greece, music was made at weddings, and there were love songs, as Erato as a muse was the protector of the love song, but knowledge is based on myths and on archaeological evidence, not on written music. In the 9th century a musical notation was developed in the Eastern Roman Empire, the neume notation, and after the addition of lines the staff was created around the 11th century, such that the exact form of music is only well-documented from this period.

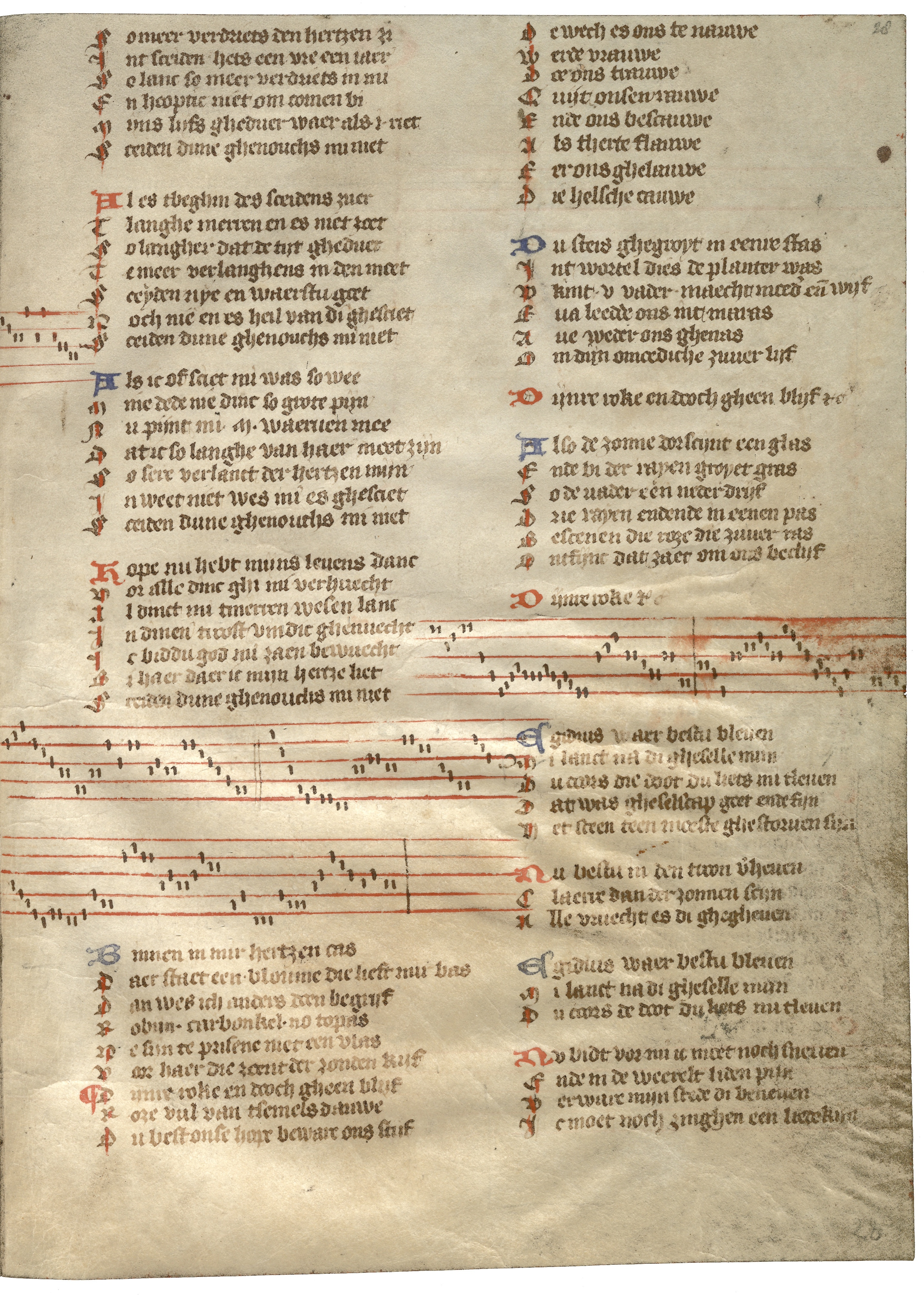
Fol. 28r of the Gruuthuuse-manuscript, with to the bottom right the song 'Egidius waer bestu bleven'

== Medieval music ==
An explanation of the genesis of love songs can be found in Denis de Rougemont's "Love in the Western World". De Rougemont's thesis is that the love song grew out of the courtly love songs of the troubadours, and that those songs represented a rejection of the historical Christian notion of love.

Medieval love songs are called "Minnelied" in Middle High German, chant d'amour courtois by trobador (Lengas d'òc) or trouvère (Langues d'oïl). The (unfulfilled, unattainable) courtly love in a noble environment is central. The worship of a woman is a recurring theme. A number of personae return, such as a lover who regrets being rejected, the lady who regrets the absence of her lord who is on a crusade. Generosity, nobility of character, receptivity to new experiences and attention to beauty and appearance are common themes. The 14th century Codex Manesse includes love songs by dukes as John I, Duke of Brabant and William IX, Duke of Aquitaine.

The Gruuthuse manuscript - written in Middle Dutch - composed around 1400 in Bruges contains 147 songs, including a number of love songs with musical notation. The manuscript is from several lyricists, mostly unknown.

== Renaissance ==
Francesco Petrarca has sung his beloved Laura in 366 poems, collected in "Canzonière". The poems were set to music by, among others, Claudio Monteverdi, Orlando di Lasso and Guillaume Dufay (Vergene bella).

"Je crois entendre" (I Hear as in a Dream)
Sung by Enrico Caruso in 1904 (3:09)

"Romance de Nadir" (encore of "Je crois entendre")
Sung by Joseph Rogatechwsky in 1928 (3:26)

== Classical music ==
Within classical music, Romanticism is most commonly associated with love music, especially romantic love music, and the love song is called a romance, although the term is not limited to vocal music.

The Oxford Dictionary of Music states that "generally it implies a specially personal or tender quality". A romance can be narrative and usually amorous, but also a simple aria in an opera, as examples, Plaisir d'amour by Padre Martini and Georges Bizet's aria "Je crois entendre encore" (romance de Nadir) from the opera Les pêcheurs de perles.

Franz Schubert wrote several romances, and Giuseppe Verdi wrote "Celeste Aida" about the impossible love for an Ethiopian slave girl. Poets such as Johann Wolfgang von Goethe and Federico Garcia Lorca wrote romances, which were later set to music, such as Take This Waltz by Leonard Cohen.

== Popular music ==
The largest group are the love songs about a broken heart, they are sometimes less melodic, and sung more raw like Lucinda Williams' "Jackson" in contrast to, for example, Celine Dion's "My Heart Will Go On", the title song of the film Titanic. The best-selling song about a broken heart is "I Will Always Love You" by Whitney Houston, written by Dolly Parton.

== See also ==
- Breakup song
- Sentimental ballad
