= Gruuthusemuseum =

Art museum in Bruges, Belgium

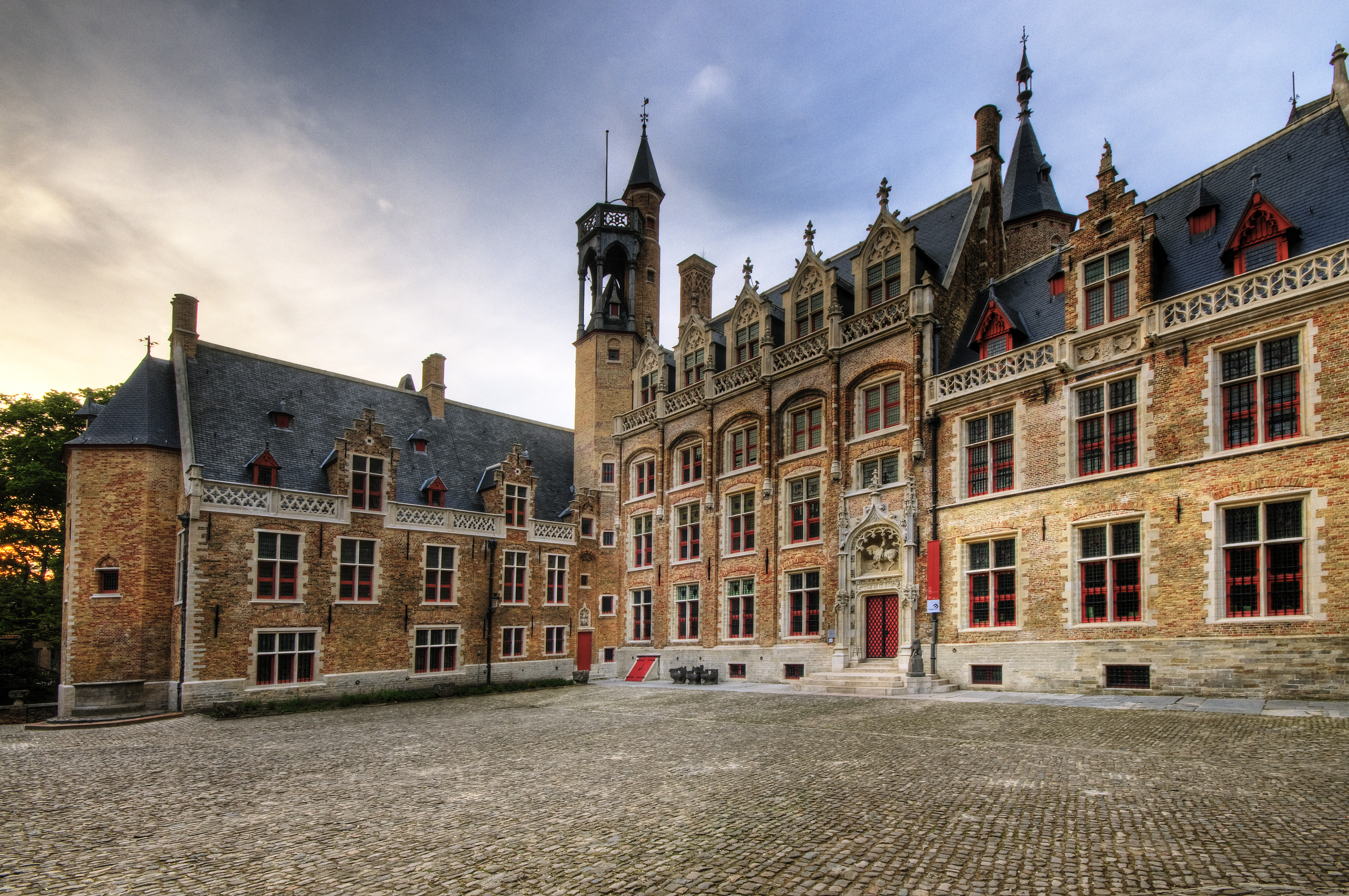
- Exterior view of the Gruuthuse
- Interactive fullscreen map
- Location: Bruges, Belgium
- Coordinates: 51.205°N 3.225°E
- Website: Official website

The Gruuthusemuseum is a museum of applied arts in Bruges, Belgium, located in the medieval Gruuthuse, the house of Louis de Gruuthuse. The collection ranges from the 15th to the 19th century.

== The Gruuthuse ==
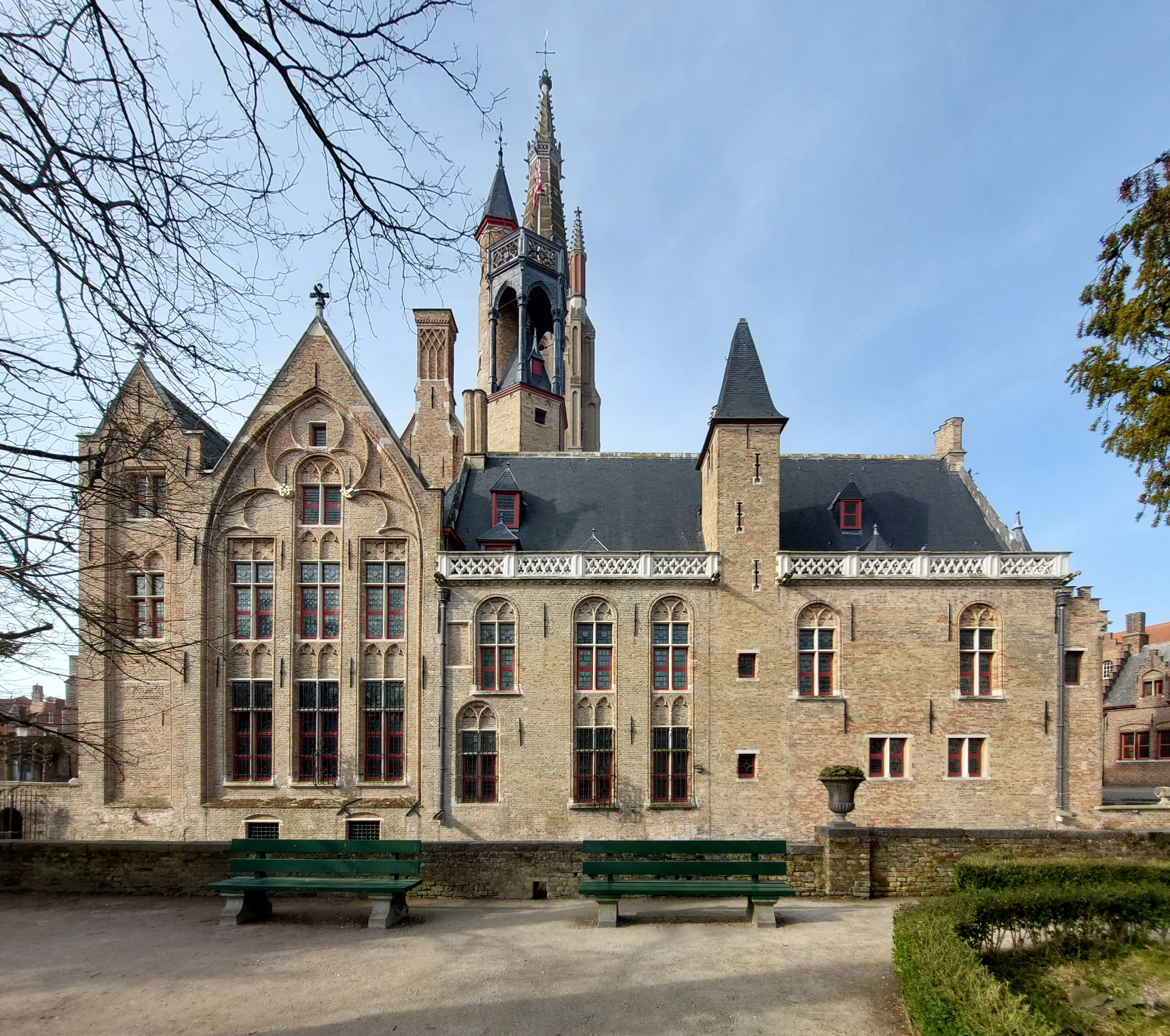
Gruuthuse, seen from the east

Presumably in the 13th century a rich family from Bruges received the monopoly to levy taxes on gruit and built a structure to store it. The building was changed in the early fifteenth century by Jan IV van der Aa to a luxury house for his family, which subsequently changed its name to "Van Gruuthuse" ("From the Gruit house"). His son Louis de Gruuthuse added a second wing to the house and in 1472 a chapel. This connects the house to the adjacent Church of Our Lady, Bruges.

In 1596, the house was bought by Philip II of Spain and in 1623 given to Wenceslas Cobergher to house the Bruges mount of piety. The city of Bruges bought the house in 1875, and architect Louis Delacenserie completely restored it between 1883 and 1895. The exterior is partly original, partly a reconstruction; the interior is mostly a late 19th century Neogothical reconstruction of a medieval interior. The building was initially used by the city of Bruges to display the archaeological collection of the Société Archéologique, and expanded into a more general museum over the years, after the city had acquired the collections for themselves in 1955.

== The collection ==
The museum was established to house the collection of the Société Archéologique. Some of the driving forces behind the start of the museum were art historian William Henry James Weale and architect William Curtis Brangwyn.

The museum displays both the interior of a house of a rich family as it would have been in the late Middle Ages and a collection of everyday tools and utensils. On display are furniture, bobbin lace, objects in gold and silver, weapons, musical instruments, and ceramics. The most famous object in the collection is the painted terracotta bust of Charles V, Holy Roman Emperor from 1520, attributed to Conrat Meit. Another highlight is the collection of Flemish tapestries from the 16th and 17th century.

The museum regularly holds exhibitions, such as "Masterpieces of Bruges Tapestry" in 1987 and "Love and Devotion" in 2013, centered on the Gruuthuse manuscript.

The museum holds a 30 centimetres (12 in) bronze bell believed to date from around 1245, making it the oldest surviving bell in Flanders, and possibly in Belgium. It was found in the backyard of a Beguinage.

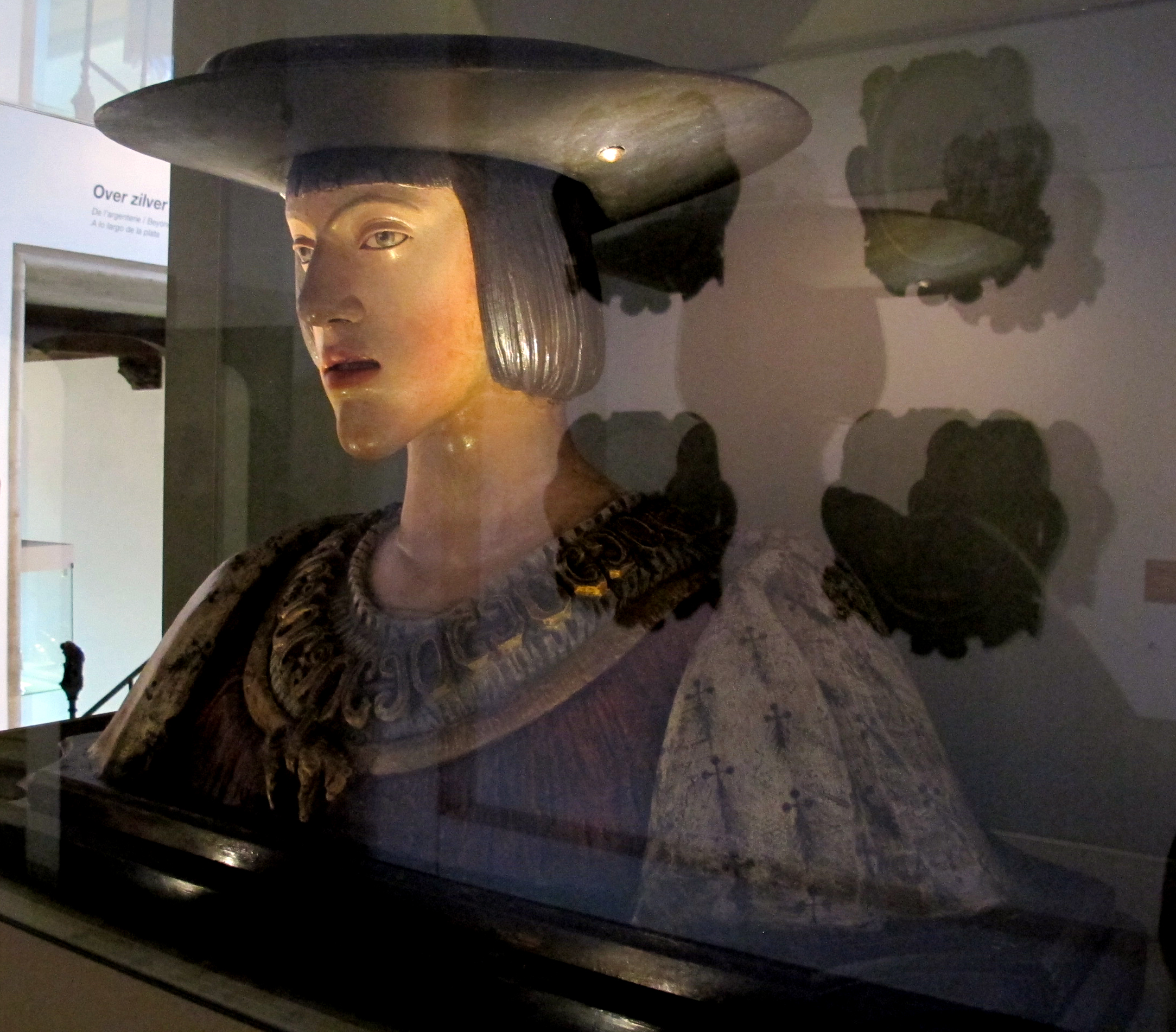
Terracotta bust of Charles V, Holy Roman Emperor, c. 1520

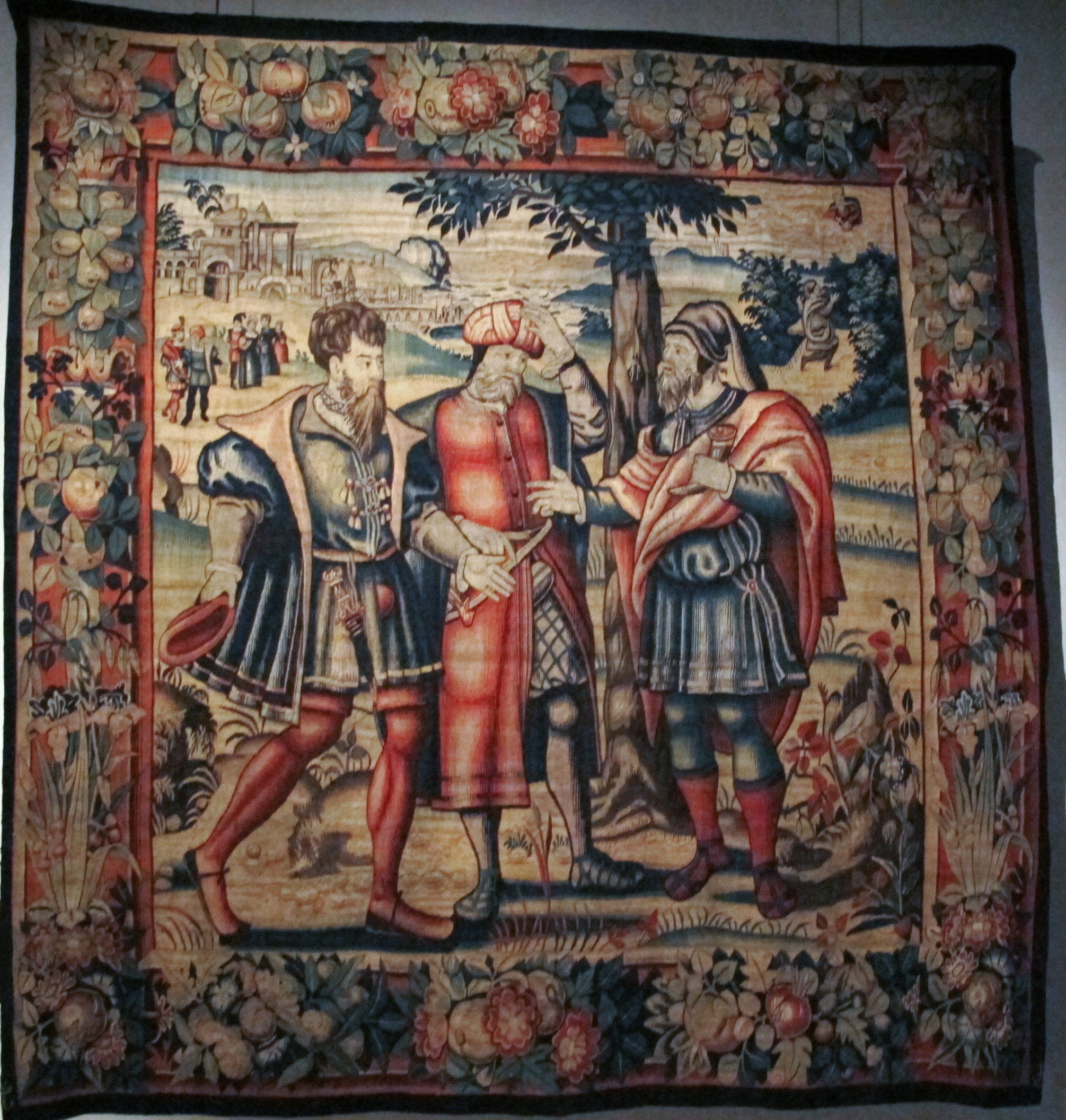
Mid-16th-century tapestry
