= Josse van Aertrycke =

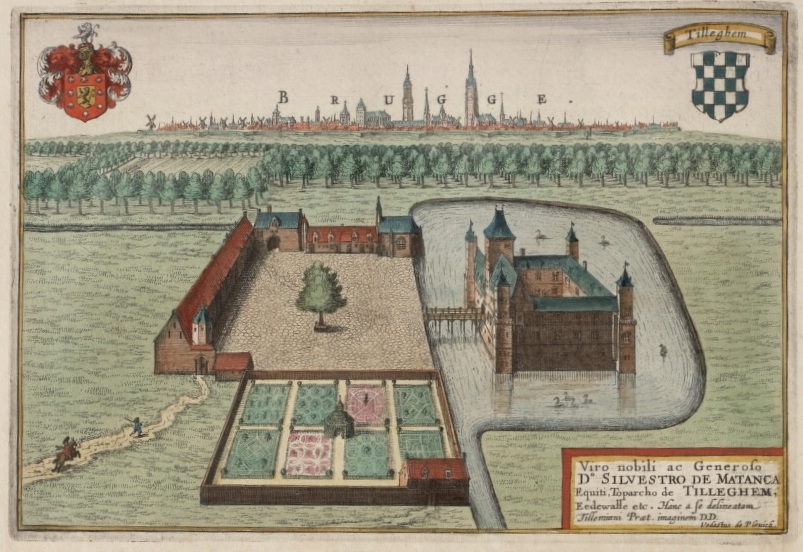
Tillegem Castle, the van Aertrycke family seat, in the first half of the 17th century - Image from Flandria Illustrata (1641)

Josse van Aertrycke (Bruges, 1451 — Azores, after 1 June 1546) was a Flemish nobleman from Bruges, who settled in Faial, Azores, in the end of the 15th century. He was probably invited by Joost De Hurtere, the first captain-major of the island, and was possibly an associate of his merchant company. His surname derives from the town of Aartrijke, one of his family lordships until 1396. According to Gaspar Frutuoso, Josse van Aertrycke received various favors and concessions from Joost De Hurtere for the establishment of his settlement in Faial.

== Biography ==
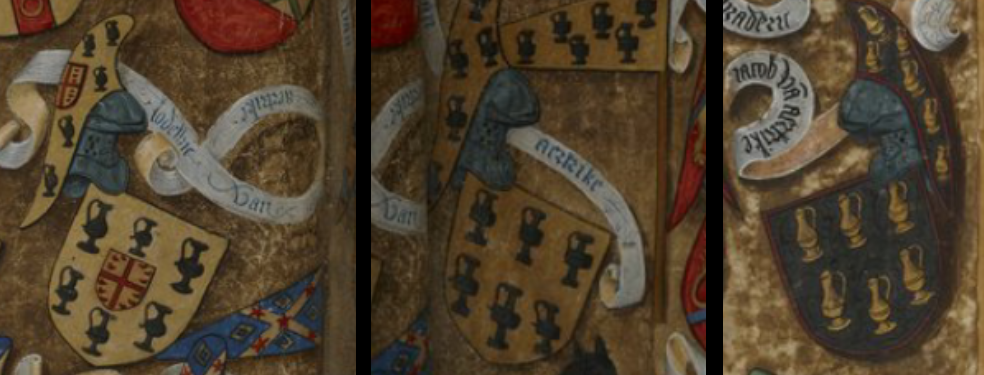
The arms of Lodewijk (left) with the van Maldeghem inescutcheon, those of his brother, Philip I (middle), and the latter's grandson, Jacob (right), as registered for the great tournament of Bruges (1391-1393)

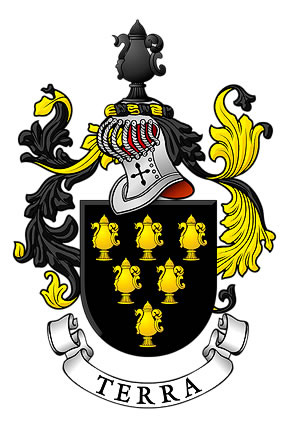
Fig. 2: van Aertrycke coat of arms.

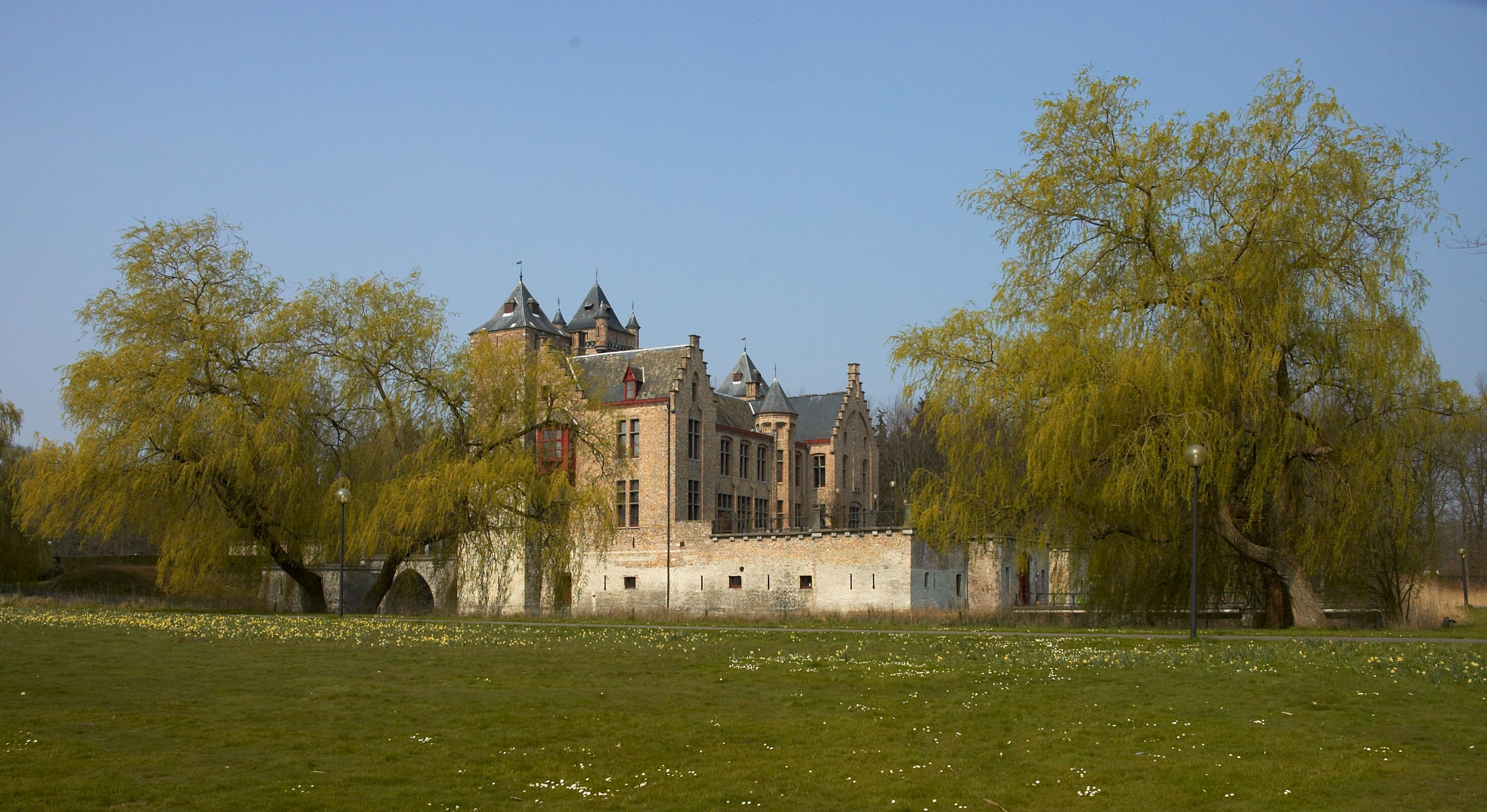
View of Tillegem's moated castle

Van Aertrycke was one of the first settlers of Faial, his lands were located between Ribeira da Conceição and the slopes of Espalamanca.

Some of the factors that led the Flemish to immigrate during the 15th century include a series of succession wars, the struggle for the centralization of power in the Burgundian Netherlands and the extreme poverty during the reign of Philip the Good, and that of his son, Charles the Bold.

One of the main reasons which attracted the Flemish to the Azores was the commercial alliance between Flanders and Portugal that dated from beginning of the Portuguese nation. At this time, Flanders was an important trade center in Europe. In addition, many Flemish settlers immigrated to the Azores when Philip the Good married Infanta Isabella of Portugal, daughter of King John I and a sister of Prince Henry, the Navigator. In the section referring to the Azores, we find this passage from the Nuremberg Globe of Martin Behaim (1492): "the aforementioned islands were colonized in the year 1466, when, after much deliberation, the king of Portugal ceded them to his sister, Isabella, Duchess of Burgundy, Countess of Flanders."

Josse van Aertrycke was the firstborn son of Jan van Aertrycke d. 1468, a notable and orator of the prévôté of Bruges, and his wife, Barbara Ferteyns. The van Aertryckes were an old family of poorters and burgomasters of Bruges, and feudal lords of Tillegem castle. Josse's paternal grand-father, Jacob (d. 3 September 1405), participated in the great tournament of Bruges under the n. 71 in 1393, and so did his ancestor, Philippe I, (Jacob's grand-father) and the latter's brother, Lodewijk, both in 1391, under the numbers 35 and 36, respectively.

On the Azores, the noble origin of van Aertrycke was first attested by Gaspar Frutuoso in his description of Faial: "there are several members of the nobility in the village of Horta, for instance, Jos Dutra (Joost De Hurtere), the donatary captain, and Guilherme da Silveira (Willem De Kersemakere) and Jos daTerra (Josse van Aertrycke)." Also, according to the Azorean historian, Marcelino Lima, van Aertrycke “was a distinguished individual, most likely coming from an ancient lineage. That is corroborated by his marriage to Margarida da Silveira, daughter of the illustrious Flemming, Guilherme da Silveira (De Kersemakere), the reputed grandson of a count, who possessed his own family arms." As a matter of fact, Josse descended from William I, Count of Holland, from the House of Borselen, and the (currently) comital family, van Maldeghem, whose escutcheon was added to the shield of his collateral relative (Lodewijk) in 1391.

There is indication that van Aertrycke or one of his descendants brought his family arms to the Azores (fig. 2) a black escutcheon with six golden pitchers. This coat of arms was probably granted to Simon van Aertrycke, the Elder, Lord of Tillegem (fl. 1331) in the mid 1340/50s in Flanders, and brought to Portugal by Josse in the 15th century. So far, it has not been possible to verify when it started to be used in Portugal.

If Josse himself brought his coat of arms from Flanders, he would have registered it in the Chapel of Our Lady of Conception, which was built soon after his arrival in Faial. The chapel, however, was ransacked in 1589 by the English, and then burned down during another English invasion in 1597. The destruction of this church probably eliminated any traces of the history of these family arms in Portugal.

=== Marriage and posterity ===
On 1 June 1545, Josse van Aertrycke received a majorat from the Portuguese crown. Van Aertrycke married Margaretha van der Haegen De Kersemakere, daughter of Willem De Kersemakere, b. 1452 in Bruges and d. 1529 in the parish of Flamengos (also where their wedding ceremony was conducted). On the Azores, most of their offspring was known by their maternal surname, 'van der Haegen', translated into Portuguese as 'da Silveira':

1. Jan van der Haeghen ( — after 26 May 1573), married to Catharina De Bruyn, only daughter of the Dutch settler from Maastricht, Willem De Bruyn d. 1553, and his wife, Violante, a granddaughter of the Scottish knight Sir John Drummond of Stobhall, and a great-niece of Queen Annabella of Scotland. Both he and his wife are buried in Madeira;
2. Emanuel van der Haeghen ( — c. 1583), sole heir to his father's majorat, married to his cousin, D. Isabel da Silveira Pereira, daughter of Tristão Martins Pereira and maternal grand-daughter of Willem De Kersemakere;
3. Josse van Aertrycke, the Younger ( — c. 1590), married to D. Maria de Pórras, daughter of Tomás de Pórras, the Elder, and his wife, Isabella De Hurtere. Maria was a maternal grand-daughter of the Flemming Antonius Cornelis and Christina De Hurtere, a niece of Joost De Hurture, through the latter's illegitimate brother, Boudewijn;
4. Frans van der Haeghen, died young;
5. Barbara van der Haeghen, married to Antoon De Bruyn, the Elder, d. after 19 July 1585, son of Willem De Bruyn and his wife, Violante;
6. Catharina van der Haeghen ( — Horta, 1568), married to Diogo Gomes of Graciosa, d. 1565. She willed the sum of 7,000 reis to her children;
7. Antoon van der Haeghen, priest ordained in the church of Horta. He left all his earthly possessions to his brother Josse; he is buried in Graciosa.

Many descendants of Josse van Aertrycke were individuals of high political, religious and social importance. These include:

- Manuel de Arriaga, the first president of the Portuguese Republic;
- António Taveia de Neiva Brum, archbishop of Goa;
- Sebastião de Arriaga, governor of the island of São Miguel (1816-1821);
- Francisco Machado de Faria e Maia, 1st Viscount of Faria e Maia, of the island of São Miguel;
- Vicente Machado de Faria e Maia, 2nd Viscount of Faria and Maia, who was appointed secretary-general of the Civil Government of Ponta Delgada;
- António de Medeiros e Albuquerque, 3rd Viscount of Laranjeiras;
- Francisco da Silveira Pinto da Fonseca, 1st Count of Amarante;
- António da Silveira Pinto da Fonseca, 1st Viscount of Canelas;
- Manuel da Silva Pinto da Fonseca Teixeira, 1st Marquis of Chaves;
- João da Silveira Pinto da Fonseca, 2nd Viscount of Várzea de Abrunhais;
- Henrique da Silva da Fonseca Cerveira Leite, 1st Viscount of Alcobaça;
- Constantino, Prince Merschersky;
- Simão de Roches da Cunha Brum, 1st Baron of Roches;
- José Francisco da Terra Brum, 1st Baron of Alagoa;
- José Francisco da Terra Brum, 2nd Baron of Alagoa;
- Manuel Maria da Terra Brum, 3rd Baron of Alagoa;
- Francisco Peixoto de Lacerda Vernek, 2nd Baron of Pati do Alferes;
- Florêncio Terra, Azorean writer, teacher and politician.

== See also ==
- Willem van der Haegen
- Josse van Huerter
- Jácome de Bruges
- Jean III d'Aa of Gruuthuse
- History of the Azores
- Tillegem Castle
