= Louis de Gruuthuse =

Flemish courtier and bibliophile

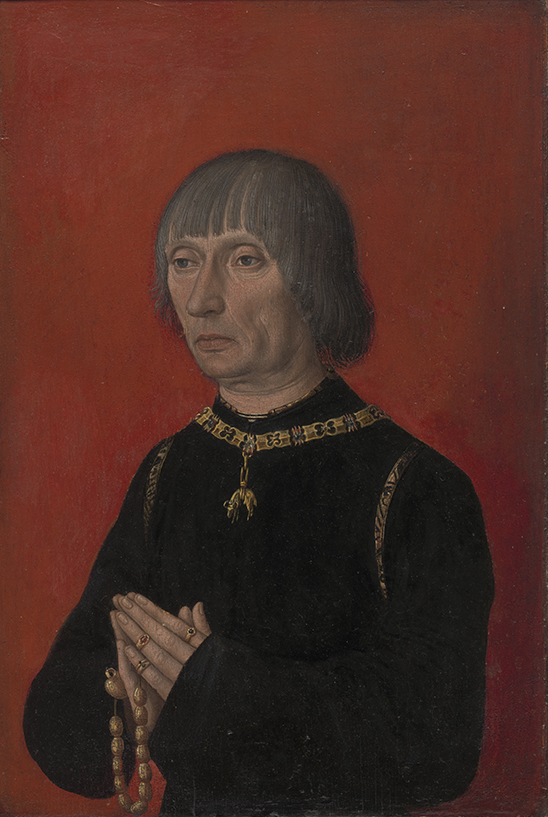
Louis de Gruuthuse, wearing the Collar of the Order of the Golden Fleece. Portrait by the Master of the princely portraits, Groeningemuseum, Bruges

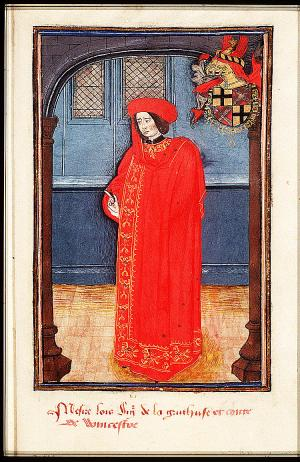
Miniature portrait inscribed Mesire Lois Sig(neu)r de la Gruuthuse et Comte de Wincestre, from a 1473 manuscript containing the statutes of the Order of the Golden Fleece

Louis de Bruges, Lord of Gruuthuse, Prince of Steenhuijs, Earl of Winchester (Dutch: Lodewijk van Brugge; c. 1427 – 24 November 1492), was a Flemish courtier, bibliophile, soldier and nobleman. He was awarded the title of Earl of Winchester by King Edward IV of England in 1472, and was Stadtholder of Holland and Zeeland 1462–77.

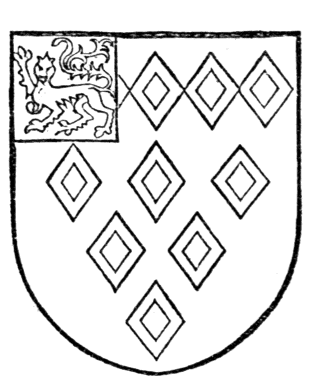
Arms of Lewis de Gruuthuse: left: his paternal arms; right: English arms granted him by the king of England: "Azure, dix mascles d'or, enormé d'une canton de nostre propre armes de Angleterre; c'est a savoir: de gules a(vec) une Lipard passant d'or armée d'azure (Azure, ten mascles or on a canton Our own arms of England, that is to say: Gules, a leopard passant or armed azure). These arms make reference to the old English arms of de Quincey, Earls of Winchester: Gules, seven mascles or 3,3,1.

== Early life ==
Born in 1427 as the legitimate son of Lord Jean IV of Bruges of the Gruuthuse family, and Margriet of Steenhuyse, Lady of Avelghem, young Loys (Louis or Ludovicus) was trained in the arts of war and the court in the wealth and luxury of Flanders' Golden Age. Louis de Gruuthuse took part in the Tournament of the White Bear in 1443, 1444, 1447, 1448 and 1450, where he often won one of the prizes. This caught the eye of the Duke of Burgundy and Count of Flanders, Philip the Good (1396–1467), who made Louis his squire and official wine server, an honorary title bestowed on only a few selected men.

As a courtier Louis followed the Duke around his expanding duchy. Meeting with the highest nobles and princes in Europe, he learned the art of diplomacy and secured his place within the Burgundian court. On 19 April 1450 Louis de Gruuthuse again took part in the Tournament of the White Bear and again he won one of the prizes.

== War ==
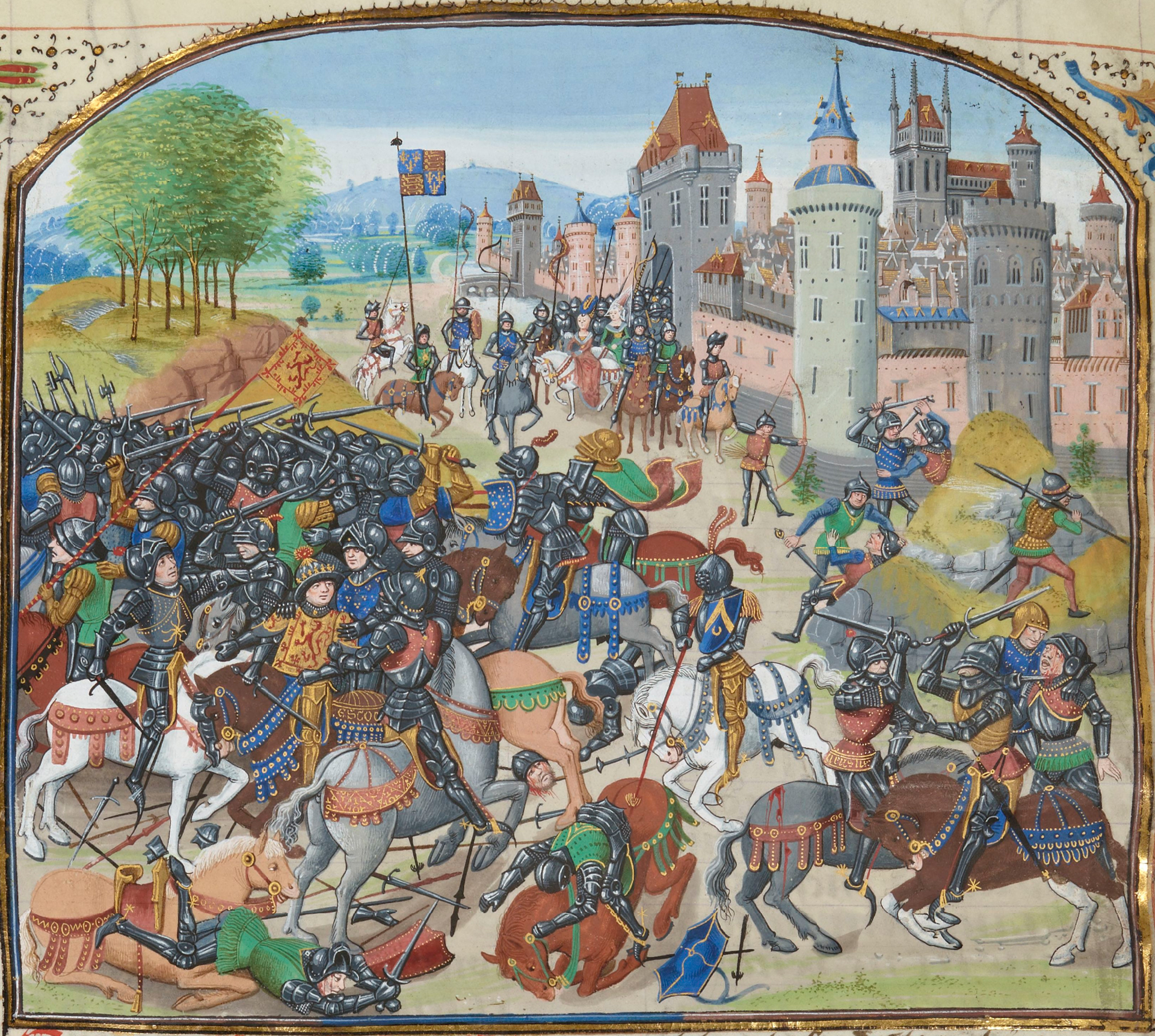
The Battle of Neville's Cross in 1346, from Louis's illuminated Froissart, Bruges, 1470s

This was his last tournament in Bruges, but a real war now came. The crisis with the city of Ghent about a salt tax reached its zenith and Ghent declared open war on Philip the Good. During this Salt War Louis was appointed governor of Bruges and he proved to be a brave and loyal ally to the duke. During the winter of 1452–1453 the Salt War laid Flanders' countryside to waste, so when spring came the duke gathered his army and moved on Ghent with Louis de Gruuthuse as one of its commanders. Loys was knighted on 23 July 1453 on the battlefield of Gavere and he was given command of the rearguard. The battle was a loss for Ghent. Louis feared the devastation of Ghent and asked the duke to spare the city of plunder. The duke's answer was: "If I would destroy this city, who is going to build me one like it?"

== Councillor ==
After the war Louis became a trusted councillor and was sufficiently trusted to arrange the wedding between Charles de Charolais, the duke's son and Margaret of York, sister to the king of England. In 1454 he was present at the Feast of the Pheasant in Lille.

In 1455 he married Margaretha, lady of Borssele, daughter of Henry II van Borselen, of the most prominent noble family of Zeeland, related to the Scottish and French royal families and to the dukes of Burgundy. They had several children. Their first son, Jean V, was born in 1458.

In 1461 Loys was made a knight of the Order of the Golden Fleece. He now bore the titles of "Siege (=lord) de Bruges", prince of Steenhuijse, Lord of Avelghem, Haamstede, Oostkamp, Beveren, Thielt-ten-Hove and Spiere.

Between 1463 and 1477 he held the position of lieutenant-general (or stadtholder) in The Hague as the duke's highest official in the provinces of Holland, Zeeland and Frisia (though the latter was at that time not part of the Burgundian territories). During the winter of 1470–1471 Gruuthuse hosted King Edward IV, an exile from the Wars of the Roses. In return Edward later gave Gruuthuse the hereditary title of Earl of Winchester, a very exceptional honour for a non-Englishman.

== Under Charles the Bold ==
Charles de Charolais, later to be known as Charles the Bold or the Rash (1433–1477), succeeded his father in 1467. Gruuthuse became his trusted councillor as well. After the duke's death on the battlefield at the gates of Nancy, he also took care of Charles' daughter Mary of Burgundy.

Grateful for his support in the difficult times after her father's death, she appointed him chamberlain to her young son Philip. Maria died at the age of 25 in 1482 after a fall from her horse, and her husband, the ambitious Maximilian I of Habsburg (1459–1519), soon clashed with the nobility and cities in Flanders as he tried to increase his power at their cost. Gruuthuse more than once came into serious conflict with the father of his protegé, the boy who was to become Duke Philip I of Castile (1478–1506), and this seriously clouded the last years of his life.

Louis de Gruuthuse died on 24 November 1492 in his palace at Bruges. It is said that a great thunderstorm raged over the city at the time of his burial.

== Patronage of the arts ==
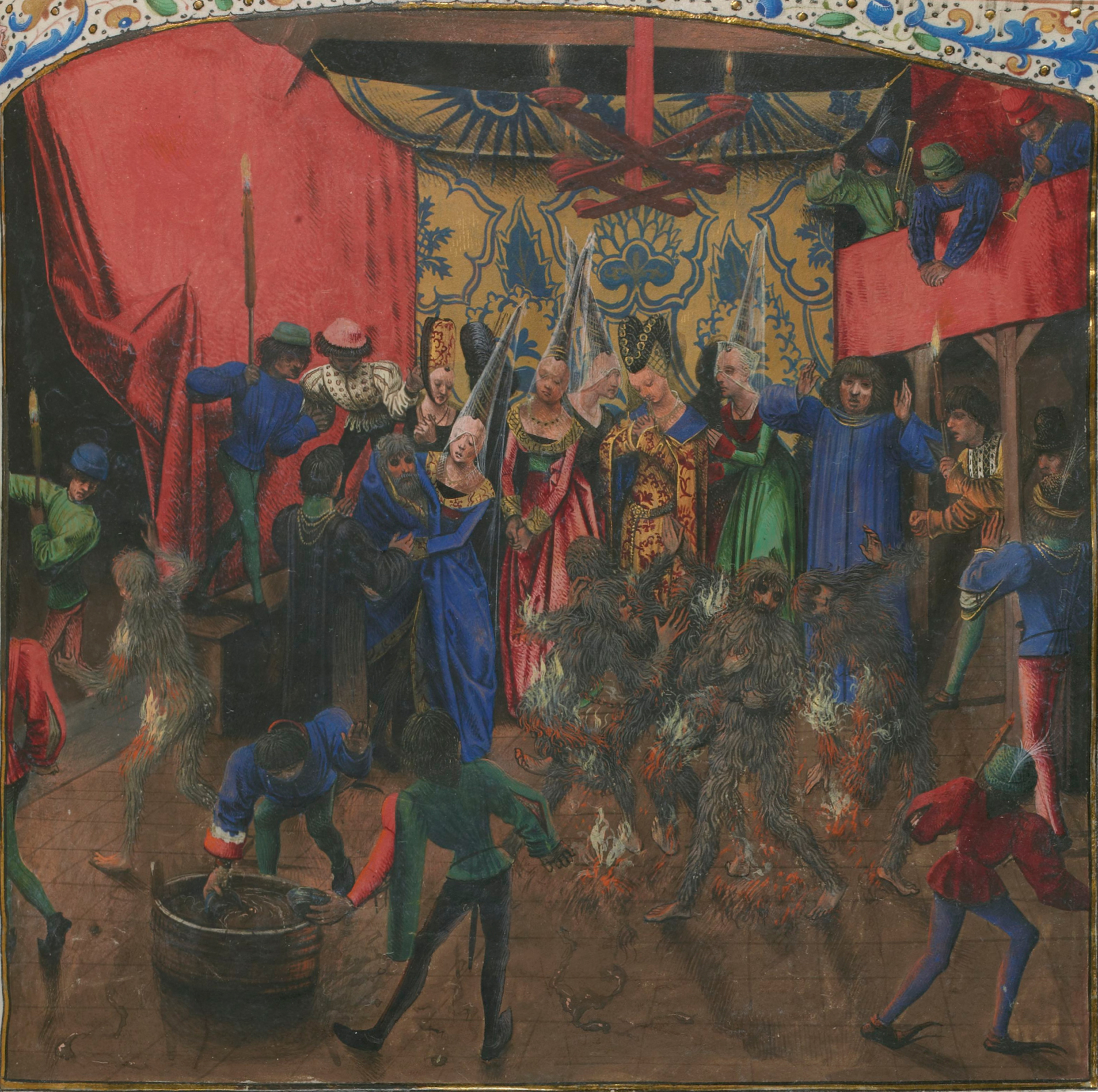
The Bal des Ardents, a deadly fire depicted by the Master of Anthony of Burgundy, from the Froissart of Louis of Gruuthuse, his most lavishly decorated manuscript.

Louis appears to have been the second largest purchaser in the period, after Philip the Good, of illuminated manuscripts from the best Flemish workshops, then at their peak of success. He appears to have had a book collection totalling 190 volumes, mostly secular in content, of which over half were contemporary illuminated copies. This made his collection over twice the size of the contemporary English Royal collection. He seems to have incorporated portraits of himself in miniatures in several books, as an extra figure, wearing the collar of the Fleece, appears in his copies but not in similar compositions in other copies of the same works. Many of his volumes passed to King Louis XII of France and are now in the Bibliotheque nationale de France, including his four-volume Froissart (BNF, Fr 2643-6) which contains 112 miniatures painted by the best Brugeois artists of the day, among them Loiset Lyédet, to whom the miniatures in the first two volumes are attributed. The other two volumes were done by the anonymous illuminators known as the Master of Anthony of Burgundy, the Master of Margaret of York, and the Master of the Dresden Prayerbook as an assistant. Among other artists who worked for Louis de Gruuthuse was also the Master of the Flemish Boethius, who i.a. illustrated what was probably Gruuthuse's last commission, a sumptuous copy of Boethius from 1492.

The Gruuthuse manuscript, containing vernacular poetry, was owned by the Belgian noble family van Caloen of Koolkerke near Bruges until it was sold to the Dutch Royal Library in The Hague in February 2007. Another manuscript, the Penitence d'Adam, of 1472, was dedicated to him by the famous Bruges scribe, and later printer, Colard Mansion.

Louis was in fact one of the last people to commission new manuscripts on such a scale; he probably began collecting books in the late 1460s, with many of his major commissions dating from the 1470s. In some cases even from that decade the titles already existed in printed form, and by the end of his life most titles could be bought printed, and Flemish illumination, especially of secular works, was in deep decline. The collapse of the Burgundian state after the death of Charles the Bold further worsened this position, and there is documentation showing Louis allowed Edward IV of England to buy a Josephus commissioned by him from the workshop, and encouraged him to make other purchases of Flemish manuscripts, probably in an attempt to maintain an industry in crisis.

== References and sources ==
Sources

- Martens, Maximiliaan P. J., ed. (1992). Lodewijk van Gruuthuse, Maecenas en Europees diplomaat. Bruges. ISBN 90-74377-03-3.
- Van den Abeele, Andries (2000). Het ridderlijk gezelschap van de Witte Beer. Bruges. ISBN 90-802756-7-0.

== See also ==
- House of Gruuthuse
- Jacob van Brugge
- Jean III d' Aa of Gruuthuse
