= Master of the Flemish Boethius =

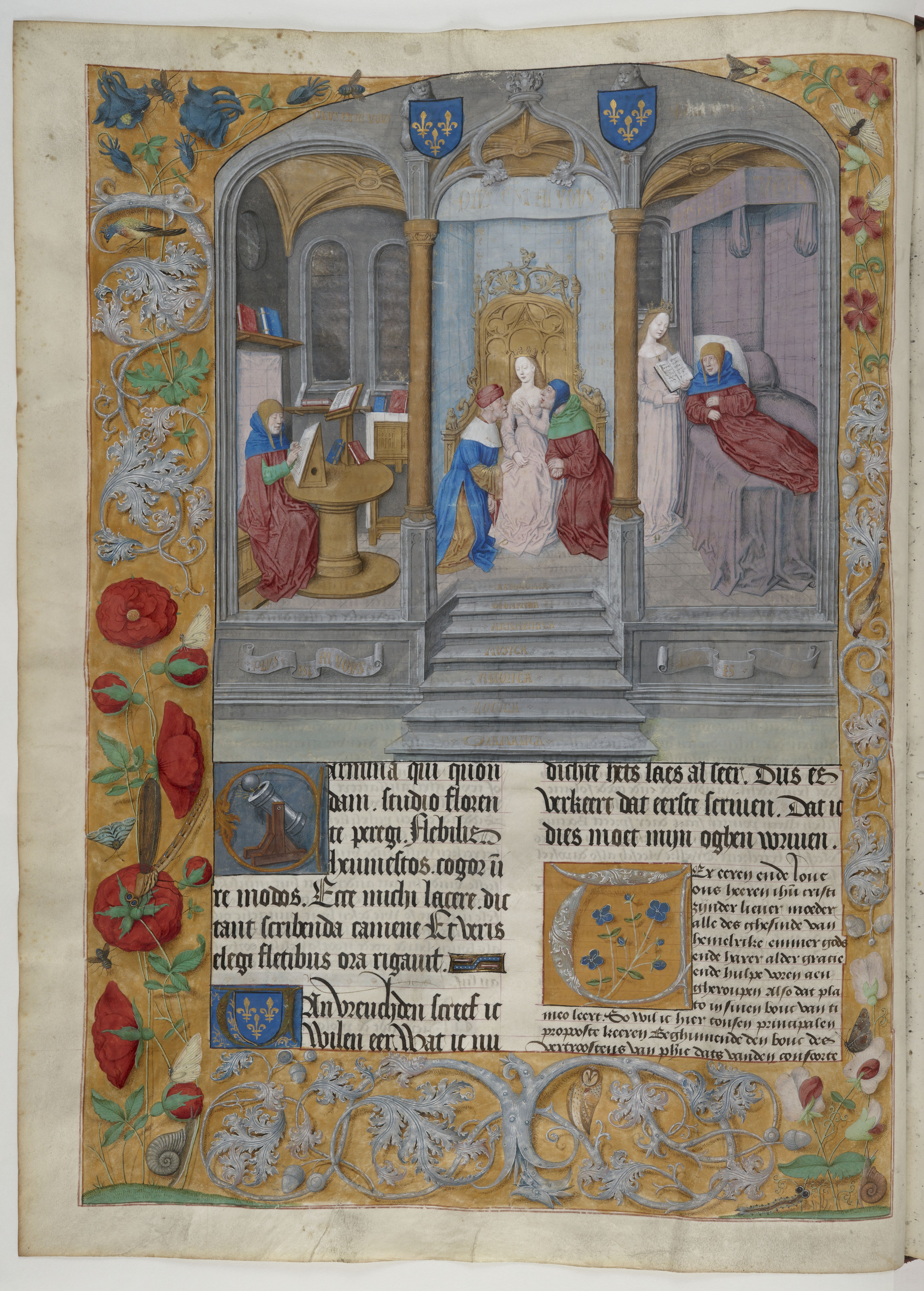
Illustration by the Master of the Flemish Boethius in the copy of Boethius made for Louis de Gruuthuse from which the notname derives

The Master of the Flemish Boethius was a miniaturist active in Flanders in the last quarter of the 15th century.

== Biography ==
The earliest miniatures attributed to the Master of the Flemish Boethius are found in a religious text written for Guillaume de Ternay and currently in the collections of Biblioteka Książąt Czartoryskich in Kraków, Poland. It was written in 1478. The notname Master of the Flemish Boethius is derived from a luxuriously illustrated copy of Boethius in Latin and Flemish, made for Louis de Gruuthuse; it was possibly his last commission, made in 1492. The Master of the Flemish Boethius also contributed to several other illuminated manuscripts commissioned by Louis de Gruuthuse, and also to books commissioned by Edward IV of England and Philip of Cleves. The Master of the Flemish Boethius collaborated with several artists at different times in both Ghent and Bruges.

== Style ==
Stylistically, the Master of the Flemish Boethius is close to the so-called Master of the First Prayer Book of Maximilian, and was at one point misidentified with Alexander Bening, the father of Simon Bening. In the Boethius manuscript, the figures of women by the Master of the Flemish Boethius have been described as elongated with faces "that resemble wood carvings"; the men are portrayed as stockier and with more individual traits.
