= Egidius waer bestu bleven =

Famous Middle Dutch song

The song Egidius waer bestu bleven (Translation: Egidius, where have you gone?) is an early rondeau from Flemish literature and a famous Middle Dutch song.

== History ==
The song was found in the Gruuthuse manuscript, which dates from around 1400 and includes musical notation. It was first published in 1849 by Charles Carton (1802 - 1863), a Belgian catholic priest. In 1966 Klaas Hanzen Heeroma (1909 - 1972), a Dutch poet and linguist, published a new edition of the songs and poems from the Gruuthuse manuscript which reached a broad audience. In 2007 the manuscript was bought from its private owner by the Royal Library of the Netherlands (Dutch: Koninklijke Bibliotheek) in The Hague.

The song was written in the late 14th century by an author who was first identified as Jan van Hulst, and later as Jan Moritoen--the manuscript has a number of authors. Egidius was tentatively identified as Gillis Honin, who is known to have died suddenly on October 8, 1385. According to Professor Frits van Oostrom, this is the most anthologized Dutch poem.

== Content ==
Egidius waer bestu bleven is an elegy or lamentation. It is about the death of a friend called Egidius, a Latinised version of the Flemish name Gillis. The poet, who calls out to Egidius rather than just mention him, envies Egidius because he has ascended to the heavens whilst the poet is still suffering on earth. He begs Egidius to reserve a place next to him in heaven.

== Music ==
The exact melody of the song is still unknown. Not only do we not know which words correspond to which notes, musicologists are also not clear how these notes have to be sung.

== Original text with translations ==
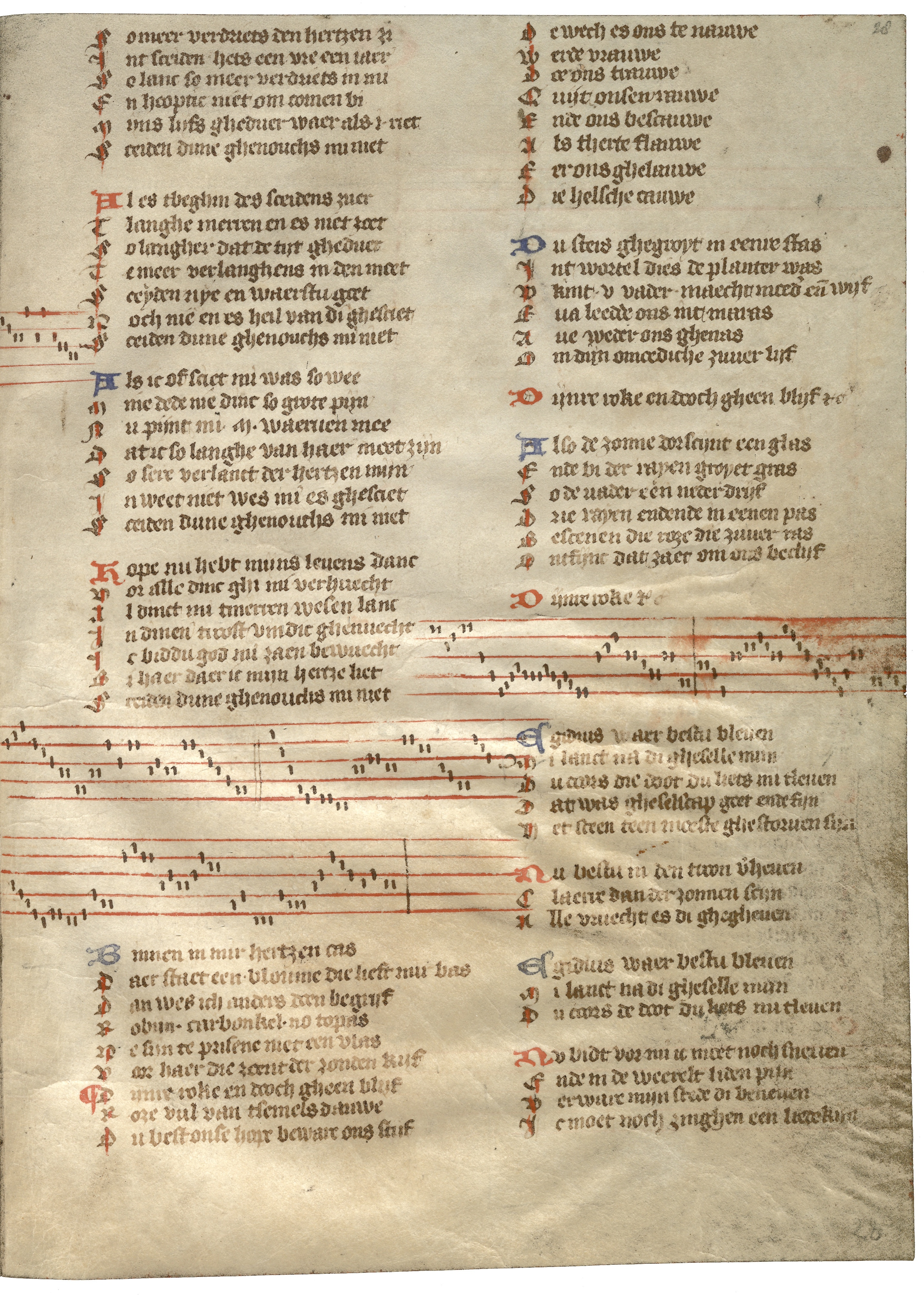
Folio 28r of the Gruuthuse manuscript. Bottom right: the song Egidius waer bestu bleven with the music notes.

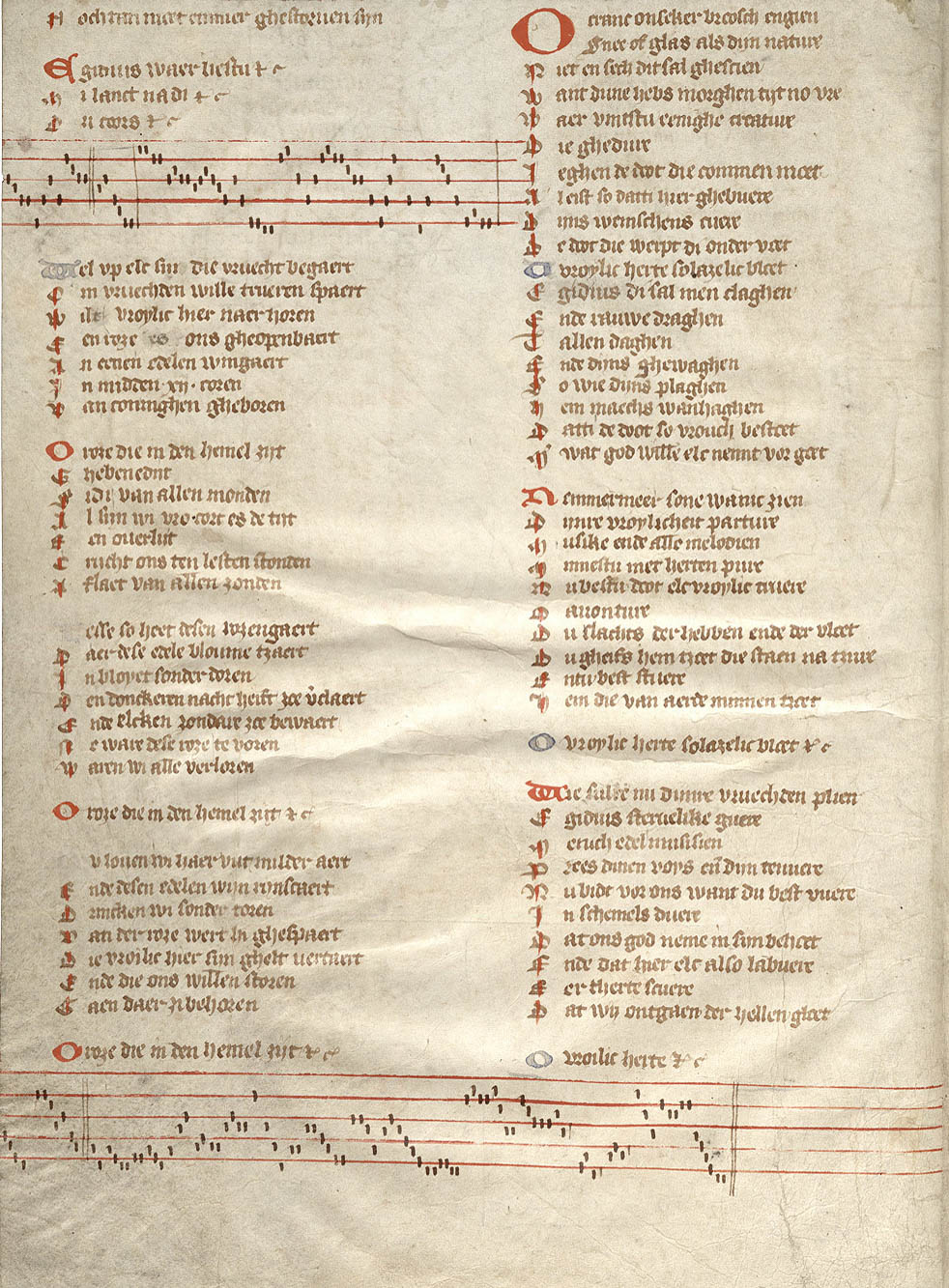
Folio 28v of the same. Top left: song ending.

	Middle Dutch	Modern Dutch	English
1 (A1)	Egidius waer bestu bleven Mi lanct na di gheselle mijn Du coors die doot du liets mi tleven	Egidius, waar ben je gebleven? Ik verlang naar jou, mijn vriend Jij proefde de dood, je liet mij het leven	Egidius, where have you gone? I long for you, my mate You tasted death, you left me life
2 (B1)	Dat was gheselscap goet ende fijn Het sceen teen moeste ghestorven sijn	Dat was gezelschap goed en fijn Het leek dat wij tegelijk zouden sterven	Your company was good and nice It seemed we would die together
3 (A2)	Nu bestu in den troon verheven Claerre dan der zonnen scijn Alle vruecht es di ghegheven	Nu ben je opgenomen in de hemel Stralender dan de zonneschijn Alle vreugde is aan jou gegeven	Now you have been taken up into heaven More radiant than the sunshine All joy has been given to you
4 (A1)	Egidius waer bestu bleven Mi lanct na di gheselle mijn Du coors die doot du liets mi tleven	Egidius, waar ben je gebleven? Ik verlang naar jou, mijn vriend Jij proefde de dood, je liet mij het leven	Egidius, where have you gone? I long for you, my mate You tasted death, you left me life
5 (A3)	Nu bidt vor mi ic moet noch sneven Ende in de weerelt liden pijn Verware mijn stede di beneven	Nu bid voor mij, ik moet nog ongelukkig zijn En in de wereld pijn lijden Bewaar mijn plaats naast jou	Now pray for me, I have yet to be unhappy And suffer pain in the world Reserve my place next to you
6 (B2)	Ic moet noch zinghen een liedekijn Nochtan moet emmer ghestorven sijn	Ik moet nog een liedje zingen Toch moet ook ik eens sterven	I still have to sing a little song But I too will have to die sometime
7 (A1)	Egidius waer bestu bleven Mi lanct na di gheselle mijn Du coors die doot du liets mi tleven	Egidius, waar ben je gebleven? Ik verlang naar jou, mijn vriend Jij koos de dood, je liet mij het leven	Egidius, where have you gone? I long for you, my mate You chose death, you left me life
8 (B1)	Dat was gheselscap goet ende fijn Het sceen teen moeste ghestorven sijn	Dat was gezelschap goed en fijn Het leek dat wij tegelijk zouden sterven	Your company was good and nice It seemed we would die together

== Bibliography ==
=== Primary text ===
- Carton, C., ed. (1849). Oud-Vlaemsche liederen en andere gedichten der XIVe en XVe eeuwen (in Dutch). Gent: C. Annoot-Braeckman.
- Heeroma, K.; Lindenburg, C. W. H. (1966). Liederen en gedichten uit het Gruuthusehandschrift (in Dutch). Leiden.

=== Secondary scholarship ===
- Geirnaert, Noël (2010). "Op zoek naar Egidius. Het laatmiddeleeuwse Brugge in het Gruuthusehandschrift". In Willaert, Frank (ed.). Het Gruuthusehandschrift in woord en klank. Nieuwe inzichten, nieuwe vragen (in Dutch). Leuven: KANTL. ISBN 9789072474834.
- Claes, Paul (2014). De sleutel (in Dutch). Nijmegen: Vantilt. pp. 16–20.
