= Jácome de Bruges =

Jácome de Bruges, 1st Captain-Donee of Terceira (born Jacob van Brugge, Gruuthuse en van der Aa circa 1418 in Bruges, Flanders) was the brother of Louis de Gruuthuse, 1st Earl of Winchester of the wealthy Gruuthuse noble family from Bruges, their grandfather Jean III d'Aa of Gruuthuse participated in the great tournament of Bruges on 11 March, 1393. Jácome became a servant of Prince Henry the Navigator of Portugal (the son of king John I), who initiated the so-called Portuguese Age of Discovery in the 15th century.

As a native of a city with a Kontor of the Hanseatic league, Jácome de Bruges had been exposed to well-ordered mercantilism, and he understood the value of international trade as a driver of national prosperity. Consequently, he was a logical candidate to enter into the service of the like-minded Prince Henry in Portugal.

Jácome, arrived on the Iberian peninsula, with many of his compatriots on business, and lived in the northern city of Porto for at least ten years. The perceived notion that de Bruges was recommended by Joost De Hurtere (a Flemish nobleman in the service of Isabella of Burgundy, sister of Duarte I of Portugal) was dismissed, with the Silves document between de Burges and Henry. It was seigniorial contract between the two men; in the 2 March 1450 contract, de Bruges received the first license from Prince Henry to lead a contingent of settlers to the island of Terceira, the 'third' island of the Azorean archipelago. The document did not stipulate the nationality, and along with seventeen Flemish families, de Bruges settled on Terceira. Yet, even with his efforts, and ten years, Jácome de Bruges was unable to fulfill his contract; this was confirmed by the donation letter of the islands of Terceira and Graciosa, made by Prince Henry to his nephew, the Infante D. Fernando. The Infante Fernando then changed the colonial settlement strategy, sending people of confidence to the islands (ultimately the contract between Bruges and Henry expired and he returned to the continent).

But, by the end of the 15th century, de Bruges returned to Terceira; he was one of two captains who were sent to the island: Jácome de Bruges installed his administration in the region of Praia, while Álvaro Martins Homem settled in Angra. Each captain commanded two distinct groups of colonists, All of these were Portuguese and none were Flemish.

Around 1472 Jácome de Bruges disappeared mysteriously, with the suggestion that he was murdered, thrown overboard while at sea, during a voyage. Jácome de Bruges had been married to the Castilian noblewoman Sancha Rodriguez d'Arce, who bore him two daughters: Antonia and F. Dias d'Arce de Bruges. In addition, he was also known to have sired two illegitimate sons: Gabriel de Bruges (1446-1471) that predeceased his father and was married to the Portuguese noblewoman Isabel Pereira Sarmento; and Pero Gonçalves, son of a woman called Inês Gonçalves and whom, otherwise, we know very little about. Therefore, Jácome de Bruges' sole heir was his eldest legitimate daughter, Antonia, since her younger sister had become a nun. This Antonia eventually married Duarte Paim (Edward Payne Montagu), a grandson of Sir Thomas Allen Payne of the Montagu family, the secretary of Philippa of Lancaster. Antonia and her husband are the ancestors of the Paim de Bruges noble family.

Ultimately more than two thousand Flemish settled in the Azores during the fifteenth century. Although these Flemish immigrants quickly adapted to Portuguese manners, habits, and culture, their legacy — in the form of windmills, clothing, and some lingering physical traits (blond hair and blue eyes) — have persisted until the present day on some Azorean islands to remind visitors of a Flemish heritage. Because of the presence of Flemish farmers, the Azores were known, until quite recently, as the Ilhas de Flamengos (Flemish Isles).

== See also ==
- House of Gruuthuse
- Louis of Gruuthuse
- Jean III d'Aa of Gruuthuse
- Josse van Huerter
- Willem van der Haegen
- Josse van Aertrycke
