= Manuel da Terra Brum, 3rd Baron of Alagoa =

Manuel Maria da Terra Brum, 3rd Baron of Alagoa
- Baron of Alagoa
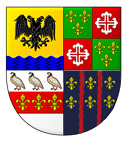
- Coat of arms
- Reign: 28 August 1901 – 11 July 1905
- Predecessor: José Francisco da Terra Brum, 2nd Baron of Alagoa
- Successor: Title extinct
- Full name: Manuel Maria da Terra Brum
- Born: 3 February 1885; Horta, Azores
- Died: 11 July 1905 (aged 20); Horta, Azores
- Noble family: Brum
- Father: José Francisco da Terra Brum
- Mother: Francisca Paula Terra Brum da Silveira Leite de Noronha

Manuel Maria da Terra Brum, 3rd Baron of Alagoa (Horta, 3 February 1825 – Horta, 11 July 1905), was a merchant and viticulturist who played a prominent role in the local politics of Faial Island, in the Azores. He was the ninth son of the 1st Baron of Alagoa.

Terra Brum was descendant of Josse van Aertrycke, a Flemish nobleman who was one of the first colonizers of Faial in the 15th century.

Carlos I granted Terra Brum the title of Baron of Alagoa during his visit to the Azores in 1901.

== Early life ==
Manuel Maria da Terra Brum was born on 2 February 1825 into several of the oldest and most distinguished families of Faial, including the Brum, Terra, and Silveira lineages. His parents were morgado José Francisco da Terra Brum, 1st Baron of Alagoa and the last capitão-mor of Faial, and Francisca Paula Brum e Silveira. He was the brother of the captain and merchant Florêncio José Terra Brum, and the uncle of the politician and writer Florêncio Terra. He was also the brother of the 2nd Baron of Alagoa.

== Business ventures ==
Like his father before him, Manuel was one of the leading winegrowers on Pico island, producing 1,000 pipas (barrels) of Verdelho wine annually. A cultured and practical merchant, Brum dedicated his life to the development of industry, agriculture, viticulture, and the noble pursuit of every source of wealth on Faial and Pico.

Following his first journey abroad, he established the Quinta da Silveira in Santo Amaro, which became "one of the richest and most beautiful estates in the Azores, rivalling the gardens of São Miguel." Indeed, Brum "was to the islands of Faial and Pico what the Cantos and the Jácome Correia, his friends and correspondents, were to São Miguel."

Oidium and phylloxera arrived in the Azores in 1852 and 1873, respectively, devastating the vineyards and ruining the livelihoods of both the impoverished inhabitants of Pico and the wealthy landowners of Horta. In his struggle against these plagues, Manuel Maria introduced new grape varieties to Pico, including American strains and the so-called Isabel grapes, popularly known as uva de cheiro (“scented grape”). His initiative sparked a renaissance in Pico winemaking, as other viticulturists adopted the new varieties, resulting in the production of new wines. During this transition, Manuel Maria spent a substantial portion of his fortune, going so far as to sell his lands in Alagoa, but ultimately succeeded in recouping his investment and reacquiring the property.

== Honours ==
In recognition of Brum’s contributions to the people of Faial and Pico, King Carlos I of Portugal, during his visit to the Azores in 1901, conferred upon him the title of 3rd Baron of Alagoa. The title had become extinct following the death of his brother, José Francisco da Terra Brum, 2nd Baron of Alagoa, in 1844.

== Death and Succession ==
Brum left his name behind in various buildings and philanthropic endeavours. On 28 November 1859, he was among the founding members of the fraternal society Amor da Pátria, serving as its president for several years. He also held the position of president of the Caixa Económica Faialense and was responsible for the construction of a road in Vista Alegre, Faial.

He never married nor had direct descendants. Upon his death, he bequeathed his house in Areia Larga, his lands in Alagoa, and several vineyards, furnishings, crockery, and boats to António da Cunha de Menezes Brum, José Bettencourt V. Correia e Ávila, his employees José Pereira and José Francisco de Medeiros, and his maids Ricarda Luísa and Constança Margarida. The remainder of his estate was divided equally among his nephews and nieces.

His funeral took place on the afternoon of 12 July 1905. The procession was attended by the directors of Amor da Pátria, Luz e Caridade, and the Asilo da Infância Desvalida, of which Brum had been a benefactor and president.
