= Jean III d'Aa of Gruuthuse =

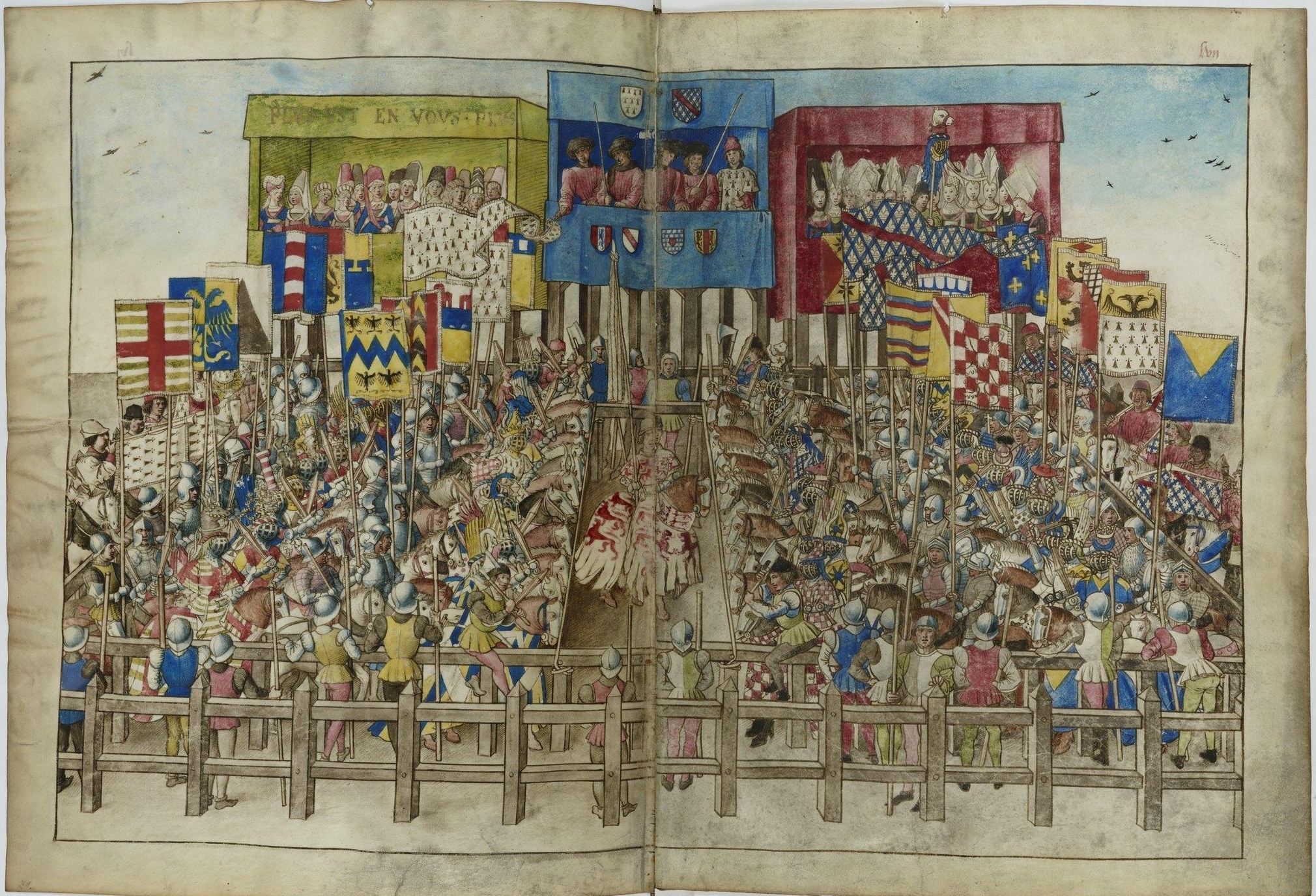
This depiction of a tournament between the dukes of Bourbon and of Brittany in King René's Tournament Book of the 1460s is closely based on the description of the tournament of 1393, down to the number of participants and the Gruuthuse motto plus est en vous inscribed over the spectators' boxes.

Jean III d'Aa, lord of Gruuthuse (Jan III van Gruuthuse en van der Aa, sieur de Gruuthuse; born about 1368/69, died before 1420) was a Flemish-Burgundian knight of the Bruges noble family of Gruuthuse. He is notable for having fought a great tournament in Bruges on 11 March 1393 against his cousin, Jean (Wulfart) de Ghistelle, lord of Gistel and Harnes. Jean was also the grandfather of Louis de Gruuthuse, himself a "bulwark of Burgundian chivalry" and a notable participant in tournaments in the 1440s.

The tournament took place on the Groote Markt (great market square) of Bruges. Jean de Gruuthuse was the challenger and fought with 49 companions; Jean de Ghistelles was defendant, with 48 companions, for a total of 99 combatants. Most of the participants were from the town patriciate. There are several extant copies of full lists of participants with their coats of arms, often appended to copies of King René's Tournament Book, which work of the 1460s was substantially influenced by the Bruges tournament of 1393.

== See also ==
- Louis of Gruuthuse
- House of Gruuthuse
- Jacob van Brugge
- Josse van Aertrycke
