= Baron of Alagoa =

Barony Alagoa
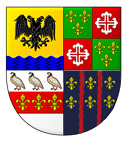
- Coat of arms of the Barons of Alagoa
- Creation date: 22 December 1841
- Created by: Maria II of Portugal
- First holder: José da Terra Brum, 1st Baron of Alagoa
- Last holder: Manuel da Terra Brum, 3rd Baron of Alagoa
- Status: Extinct
- Extinction date: 11 July 1905
- Seat: Faial Island

Baron of Alagoa was a noble title created by Queen Maria II by decree, dated 22 December 1841, in favour of José Francisco da Terra Brum, a wealthy merchant from the city of Horta, Azores. He resided on the banks of the Ribeira da Conceição and was the proprietor of the lands known as Alagoa, where the eponymous sports ground is located.

== History ==
José Francisco da Terra Brum distinguished himself through his support of the liberal cause in the Azores. In 1832, following the establishment of the liberal regime in the archipelago, he was appointed Colonel of Volunteers by King Pedro IV. In recognition of his services, he was granted the title of counsellor in 1834 and later, in 1841, was honoured by Queen Maria II with the title of Baron of Alagoa.

Manuel Maria da Terra Brum, the ninth son of José da Terra Brum, 1st Baron of Alagoa, stood out as one of the foremost winegrowers of Pico and a prominent public figure on the island of Faial. In 1901, acknowledging his contributions to the region, King Carlos I reinstated the title of Baron of Alagoa in his favour. The barony had been extinct since 1844, the year of the death of his elder brother, José Francisco da Terra Brum, 2nd Baron of Alagoa.

== Coat of arms ==
There is no record of a formal grant of arms having been issued to the Terra families, however, the following was in use:

Quartered shield:

- In the first quarter, on a field of gold, a black double-headed eagle, and at its feet a blue wavy base;
- In the second quarter, the arms of the Pereira family quartered with those of the Leite family (three gold fleurs-de-lis on a green field);
- In the third quarter, the arms of the Brum family, which are: on a silver field, a red fess bearing three gold fleurs-de-lis, and a chief with three partridges in their natural colours;
- In the fourth quarter, the arms of the Silveira family (three sanguine bars on a silver field).

Helmet: silver, open-faced, adorned in gold.

Crest: the eagle from the first quarter.

== Barons of Alagoa (1841) ==
#	Name	Birth	Death	Reign	Spouse	Notes
1	José da Terra Brum, 1st Baron of Alagoa	10 March 1776	22 December 1842	22 December 1841 – 22 December 1842	Francisca Paula Terra Brum da Silveira Leite de Noronha	Title conferred. He had eleven children (plus three outside marriage).
2	José Francisco da Terra Brum, 2nd Baron of Alagoa	24 September 1809	3 September 1844	22 December 1842 – 3 September 1844	Maria Júlia Terra Carvalhal	Eldest son of the 1st Baron. He had two daughters.
3	Manuel da Terra Brum, 3rd Baron of Alagoa	3 February 1885	11 July 1905	28 August 1901 — 11 July 1905	Did not marry	Ninth son of the 1st Baron. Died without issue. Title extinct.
