= José Francisco da Terra Brum, 2nd Baron of Alagoa =

José da Terra Brum, 2nd Baron of Alagoa
- Baron of Alagoa
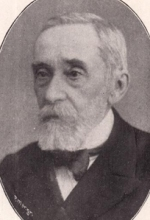
- José Francisco da Terra Brum, 2nd Baron of Alagoa

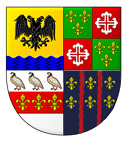
- Coat of arms
- Reign: 22 December 1842 – 3 September 1844
- Predecessor: José da Terra Brum, 1st Baron of Alagoa
- Successor: Manuel da Terra Brum, 3rd Baron of Alagoa
- Full name: José Francisco da Terra Brum
- Born: September 24, 1809; Horta, Azores
- Died: September 3, 1844 (aged 34); Horta, Azores
- Noble family: Brum
- Spouse: Maria Júlia Terra Caravalhal (m. 1832)
- Issue: 2 children
- Father: José da Terra Brum, 1st Baron of Alagoa
- Mother: Francisca Paula Terra Brum da Silveira Leite de Noronha

José Francisco da Terra Brum, 2nd Baron of Alagoa (Horta, 24 September 1809 – Horta, 3 September 1844), son of the José da Terra Brum, 1st Baron of Alagoa. Terra Brum inherited all the properties from his father and lived in Faial for his whole life.

Terra Brum was descendant of Josse van Aertrycke, a Flemish nobleman who was one of the first colonizers of Faial in the 15th century.

== Marriage and issue ==
Terra Brum married Maria Júlia Terra Caravalhal on 9 February 1832 and had the following children:

- Maria (1843), died soon after birth;
- Maria da Glória Terra (1838 – ?), married her cousin José Francisco da Câmara Berquó.
