= Earl of Winchester =

Title in the Peerage of England

Earl of Winchester was a title that was created three times in the Peerage of England during the Middle Ages. The first was Saer de Quincy, who received the earldom in 1207/8 after his wife inherited half of the lands of the Beaumont earls of Leicester. This creation became extinct in 1265 upon the death without male heirs of Saer's son Roger de Quincy. In 1322 King Edward II created the elder Hugh le Despenser earl of Winchester. This creation lapsed after Despenser's execution in 1326.

During his exile in 1470–71 Edward IV had been the guest of a Flemish nobleman, Lewis de Bruges. After Edward's return to the throne, Lewis was rewarded with the earldom of Winchester. His son, the second Earl, returned it to the crown in 1500.

== Earls of Winchester, 1st Creation (1207) ==
- Saer de Quincy, 1st Earl of Winchester (died 1219)
- Roger de Quincy, 2nd Earl of Winchester (died 1264)

== Earls of Winchester, 2nd Creation (1322) ==
- Hugh le Despenser, 1st Earl of Winchester (died 1326)

== Earls of Winchester, 3rd Creation (1472) ==
- Lewis de Bruges, 1st Earl of Winchester (1427–1492)
- John de Bruges, 2nd Earl of Winchester (1458–1512), renounced peerage 1500.

== See also ==
- Marquess of Winchester
