= José da Terra Brum, 1st Baron of Alagoa =

- Baron of Alagoa
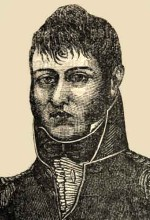
- José Francisco da Terra Brum, 1st Baron of Alagoa

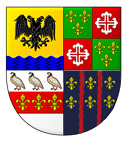
- Coat of arms
- Reign: 22 December 1841 – 22 December 1842
- Predecessor: Title bestowed
- Successor: José Francisco da Terra Brum, 2nd Baron of Alagoa
- Full name: José Francisco da Terra Brum
- Born: March 10, 1776; Horta, Azores
- Died: January 22, 1842 (aged 65); Horta, Azores
- Noble family: Brum
- Spouse: Francisca Paula Terra Brum da Silveira Leite de Noronha (m. 1803)
- Issue: 11, inc José Francisco da Terra Brum, 2nd Baron of Alagoa and Manuel da Terra Brum, 3rd Baron of Alagoa; 3, outside of marriage
- Father: Francisco Inácio Brum Terra
- Mother: Joaquina Clara de Noronha

José Francisco da Terra Brum, 1st Baron of Alagoa (Horta, 10 March 1776 – Horta, 22 January 1842), was a landed proprietor, a major landowner on the islands of Faial and Pico, a winegrower, and a wine merchant and exporter, who distinguished himself through his support for the liberal cause during the initial phase of the Portuguese Civil War.

Terra Brum was the first title holder of Baron of Alagoa, a noble title created by Queen Maria II by decree, dated 22 December 1841.

Terra Brum was descendant of Josse van Aertrycke, a Flemish nobleman who was one of the first colonizers of Faial in the 15th century.

== Early years ==
He was born in the city of Horta, on the island of Faial. His father was the landed proprietor Francisco Inácio Brum Terra, and his mother was Joaquina Clara de Noronha. Joaquina Clara was the daughter of João Inácio Homem da Costa Noronha, from Terceira Island, and Clara Mariana Xavier de Noronha Côrte-Real, a family from the highest local aristocracy.

José Francisco's ancestors, the Terras and the Brums, were considered among the oldest and most distinguished families on Faial.

== Career ==
During his lifetime, Terra Brum became one of Faial's most significant landowners. With his vast rural estates, he was known as the morgado, a portuguese term for a landed proprietor. His properties stretched along the Conceição stream and the area known as Alagoa coast, which was then on the outskirts of Horta city in Faial. He also owned and maintained viticulture properties on the neighbouring island of Pico, where he was a leading producer of Verdelho wine.

In August 1822, José Francisco Terra Brum made a donation of four pipas of wine to the Portuguese State, which were shipped aboard the yacht Conceição e Almas, commanded by Master António Gomes de Paiva. The offering was communicated to the General and Extraordinary Courts of the Portuguese Nation, which instructed that it be forwarded to the Government so that the casks might be received and allocated in accordance with prior precedents. The matter was formally handled by the Secretariat of State for Finance, with dispatches signed by Sebastião José de Carvalho and João Baptista Felgueiras on the 5th, 8th, and 9th of August 1822, respectively, from the Palace of Queluz and the Palace of the Courts.

By decree of 7 December 1832, Dom Pedro, Duke of Braganza, established a commission tasked with organising a new loan in the Azores Islands. The commission was composed of seven members, including the Viscount of Bruges, the Baron of Noronha, and prominent local figures such as António Mariano de Lacerda (Sub-Prefect of Vila da Horta), Manuel de Medeiros da Costa Canto e Albuquerque, Jacintho Ignácio Rodrigues da Silveira, José Francisco da Terra Brum, and Duarte Borges da Câmara Medeiros. The responsibilities of the commission included organising the issuance of shares, ensuring amortisation, and guaranteeing repayment through the revenues of the customs houses and public assets of the islands which had not yet been allocated to other purposes.

In 1832, he hosted the Duke of Braganza, the future King Dom Pedro IV, at his residence in Horta, a gesture later acknowledged by the Municipal Council with a commemorative plaque in 1877. During this visit, Terra was accompanied by his entire family, including his wife, ten children, and several servants.

== Liberal Cause ==
He was a prominent proponent of the liberal cause. When the liberal revolt in Horta took place in 1820, he became a member of the Horta Governing Junta. Leveraging his prestige and financial influence, he oversaw the organisation of the volunteer battalions from Faial that were integrated into the liberating army, which notably executed the landing at Mindelo.

On 4 January 1824, the members of the Provisional Council of the District of Horta sent a message of congratulations to the Congress of the Cortes, welcoming its establishment and expressing their firm adherence to the prevailing constitutional system. The message emphasised the patriotic enthusiasm of the signatories and their commitment to the new social pact of the Portuguese Nation. Among the signatories of the document were José Francisco da Terra Brum, together with Estácio Machado de Utra Telles, Francisco Xavier da Silva, and Serapião Peregrino Ribeiro.

== Honours ==
José Francisco da Terra Brum was one of the most prominent landed proprietors on the islands of Faial and Pico. He held the rank of Lieutenant-Colonel of the militia and served as Captain-Major of Faial (appointed by patent on March 14th, 1818, succeeding his cousin Jorge da Cunha Brum Terra e Silveira). He was also a Knight-Fidalgo of the Royal Household, inheriting this distinction from his ancestors (confirmed by royal charter on April 30th, 1794), and a member of His Most Faithful Majesty's Council (by royal letter in January 1834). He was also a Knight of the Order of Christ.

In 1832, following the establishment of the liberal regime in the Azores, D. Pedro IV appointed him Colonel of Volunteers. For his dedicated service to the liberal cause, he was granted the status of Counsellor in 1834. In 1841, Queen D. Maria II bestowed upon him the title of Baron of Alagoa, a hereditary title for two lives, with the family seat of the barony being the lands he owned in Alagoa, near the mouth of the Conceição stream. He also held the rank of Knight of the Order of Christ.

== Marriage and issue ==
José Francisco da Terra Brum married his cousin, Francisca Paula Terra Brum da Silveira Leite de Noronha. She was the daughter of João José Brum, a landed proprietor, doctor of canon law, fidalgo, and knight of the Royal Household, and Mariana Victoria de Noronha, from the nobility of Terceira Island. This marriage significantly increased José Francisco's already substantial entailed estate, as it merged with his consort's even larger one. Francisca Paula Brum e Silveira's ancestors, the Silveiras, were also prominent members of Faial's aristocracy and held a significant entailed estate of their own.

Together, they had a total of eleven children, of whom the firstborn and the ninth became the 2nd and 3rd Barons of Alagoa, respectively.

Their issue was as follows:

- Joaquina Emília da Terra Brum (1806–1881). She married, in her first marriage, in 1834, José Francisco da Câmara Berquó. She married, in second nuptials, in 1843, José Maria de Sequeira;
- José Francisco da Terra Brum, 2nd Baron of Alagoa (1809–1844);
- Francisca Emília Terra (1812–1900). She married, in 1843, João Bettencourt de Vasconcelos Corrêa e Ávila (1806–1868);
- Rita Emília Brum (1814–1829);
- João José (1816–1831);
- Francisco Inácio da Terra Brum (1817–1881);
- Tomás José Brum Terra (1818–1906). He married, in 1841, his cousin Maria Madalena Cunha (1817–1884), by whom he had issue;
- Manuel (1820). Died in infancy;
- Maria José Brum Terra (1822–1903). She married, in 1845, her cousin Jorge da Cunha Menezes Brum;
- Manuel Maria Terra Brum, 3rd Baron of Alagoa (1825–1905);
- João José Paim Brum Terra (1829–?). He married, in 1868, Adelaide Vasconcelos, a native of the city of Angra.

Out of wedlock, Terra Brum had the following children with Olinda Mariana:

- Eulália Joaquina Terra (1821–1903);
- Olinda Terra (1823–1905);
- Florêncio José Terra Brum (1825 – 1877). He married Maria dos Anjos da Silva Sarmento (?–1919) in 1854 and they had three children and one grandchild. Father of the Azorean writer Florêncio Terra.

== Death and succession ==
After José Francisco's death on January 22, 1842, his eldest son, José Francisco da Terra Brum, became the 2nd Baron of Alagoa. However, the second Baron Terra Brum died in 1844, leading to the extinction of the title.

In 1901, King D. Carlos reinstated the barony in favour of Manuel Maria da Terra Brum, José Francisco's ninth son. Like his father, Manuel Maria was one of the largest winegrowers on Pico and a prominent public figure on both sides of the Faial-Pico Channel.
