= Brum (surname) =

== Brum ==
Brum is a Portuguese surname of Flemish roots, derived from Willem van der Bruyn, migrant to the Azores, where he came to be known as Guilherme de Brum.

== Duchy of Burgundy (XIVth century) ==
While the Portuguese Crown expanded its overseas domains, continental Europe was being destroyed by wars. The Duchy of Burgundy, one of the most powerful at the time, was not left out.

It played a significant role in the Hundred Years' War (1337–1490), sometimes aligned with France (from 1337 to 1419 and from 1435 to 1453), sometimes aligned with England (from 1419 to 1435). Joan of Arc was captured by the Burgundian army when it attacked them in Margny. The British crown paid the ransom to keep her in prison.

In the Battle of Sluys, 24,000 people died.

On 24/08/1436, the Battle of Crecy took place, with the Siege of Calais, very close to Flanders. · Between 1350 and 1490, local groups fought the Hook and Cod Wars: one side called itself the cod (cod) because of the ferocity of the fish, which devours whatever it finds in front of it as it grows; and the other side called itself the hook, which catches the cod, no matter its size.

== Migration to the Azores ==
While Continental Europe was lost in religious wars and others that broke out at the personal whim of each monarchy, the Illustrious Generation took care to expand the Portuguese overseas empire. The Azores archipelago was rediscovered by Gonçalo Velho Cabral in 1432, who received the concession of the first islands, Santa Maria and São Miguel. In 1450, D. Henrique issued a letter of concession of Terceira Island to the Flemish Jácome de Bruges: "authorizing the new captain to use any colonists, as long as they were Christians."[5] In 1465, Joos van Hurtere landed on Faial Island with 15 other compatriots, where they remained for a year in search of silver and tin. In 1466, D. Fernandez granted Jos Hurtere the captaincy of Pico Island, on the recommendation of his aunt, Duchess Dª Isabella of Burgundy or Dª Isabella van Portugal. Jos Hurtere (Jorge Utra) married Dª Beatriz Macedo, a courtier of the Portuguese Crown, and thus assumed the status of vassal of the King of Portugal. In 1467, Joos Hurtere returned to the island on an organized expedition to begin the settlement. Along with him, Baldwin and Jossina, his brothers, and a cousin named António disembarked. These were the ancestors of the genealogy of the Utras (or Dutras) family.[6] On 29/12/1482, the island of Faial was integrated into the captaincy of Jorge Utra, who hired Wilhelm van der Hagen to recruit settlers from the Netherlands for his captaincy in the Azores. The last wave of Flemish settlers occurred in the 15th century and was made up of "people chosen from various professions, who came accompanied by tools for farming and for the establishment of a reinforcement colony of Captain Joss Hurtere. This means that, this time, the organization of the trip, certainly by the dowager duchess (La Grande Madame, as she was then known) had been done carefully, using the experience that Hurtere already had and that he had shared on his trip to Flanders." [7]

"The migratory current from Flanders to the Azores ended for a number of reasons, such as the death of Duchess Isabel, its driving force, in 1471; the defeat and death of Charles the Bold in 1477 and the end of the expansionist policy; the marriage of his heiress, Mary of Flanders, with Emperor Maximilian and the transfer of the County of Flanders and the Duchy of Burgundy to the orbit of the Holy Empire. On the part of Portugal, the urgency to resort to foreign settlers, due to the lack of any available in the national territory, was alleviated by the increase in the number of Portuguese available to migrate to the islands, with the success of colonization, from the end of the 15th century (1400) and the natural demographic increase of the descendants of the pioneers".[8] Finally, the strong presence of immigrants from the Netherlands, mainly on the islands of Faial, Pico, Flores and São Jorge, is a consensus and was reflected in the customs and ways of exploiting the land: the introduction of wheat and pastel crops. There is a parish in the municipality of Horta called Flamengos.[9]

== Wilhelm van der Bruyn ==
Wilhelm van der Bruyn was the first Flemish migrant to the Azores, where he became known as Guilherme de Brum and met, had relationships and had descendants with other Flemish migrants, mainly Lodewijk Govaert (Luis Goulart), Jesse van der Aertrijke (José Terra), Joost de Hurtere (José Silveira), forming the municipality of Horta called Flamengos.

== Notable people with the surname ==
- Alfeo Brum (1898–1972), Uruguayan politician and lawyer
- Baltasar Brum (1883–1933), Uruguayan politician who served as the 23rd President of Uruguay
- Blanca Luz Brum (1905–1985), Uruguayan writer, journalist, poet and artist
- Banny deBrum (1956–2011), ambassador of the Republic of the Marshall Islands to the United States
- Celso Brum Junior (born 1978), Brazilian retired volleyball player
- Daniel Brum (born 1954), American Orthodox bishop
- Eliane Brum (born 1960), Brazilian journalist
- Fernanda Brum (born 1976), Brazilian Christian music singer
- Gabriella Brum (born 1962), German-British model who won the 1980 Miss World beauty pageant
- Jorge Brum do Canto (1910–1994), Portuguese film director
- Jorge Luis da Silva Brum, best known as Pinga (born 1965), Brazilian former footballer
- José Francisco da Terra Brum (1776–1842), Portuguese baron and winegrower
- Manuel José de Arriaga Brum da Silveira e Peyrelongue (1840–1917), Portuguese politician who served as the first elected President of the First Portuguese Republic
- Manuel Maria da Terra Brum (1825–1905), Portuguese baron and winegrower - son of the abovementioned José Francisco da Terra Brum
- Roberto Brum (born 1978), Brazilian footballer
- Roberto Brum (born 1983), Uruguayan footballer
- Tony deBrum (1945–2017), Marshallese politician and government minister
