= Tillegem Castle =

Belgian castle

Coordinates: 51.176°N 3.197°E

- Belgium

Site information
- Type: Castle

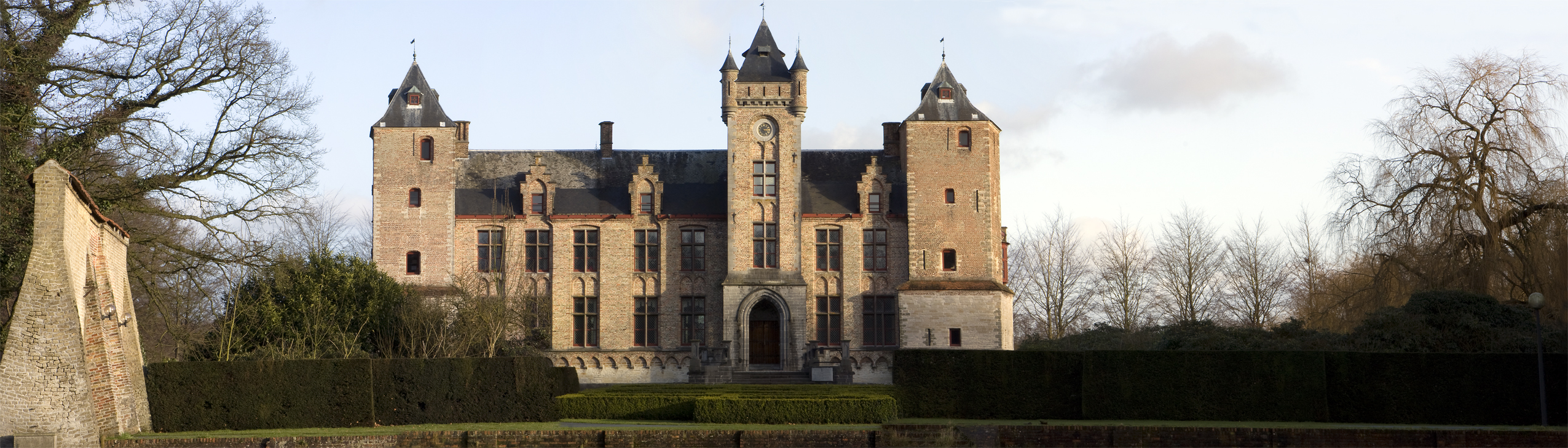
Tillegem Castle is a castle in Belgium. Since 1980, the castle and its park have been property of the Province of West Flanders.

== See also ==
- List of castles in Belgium
