= Koolkerke =

Sub-municipality of the city of Bruges, Belgium

- Sub-municipality of Bruges
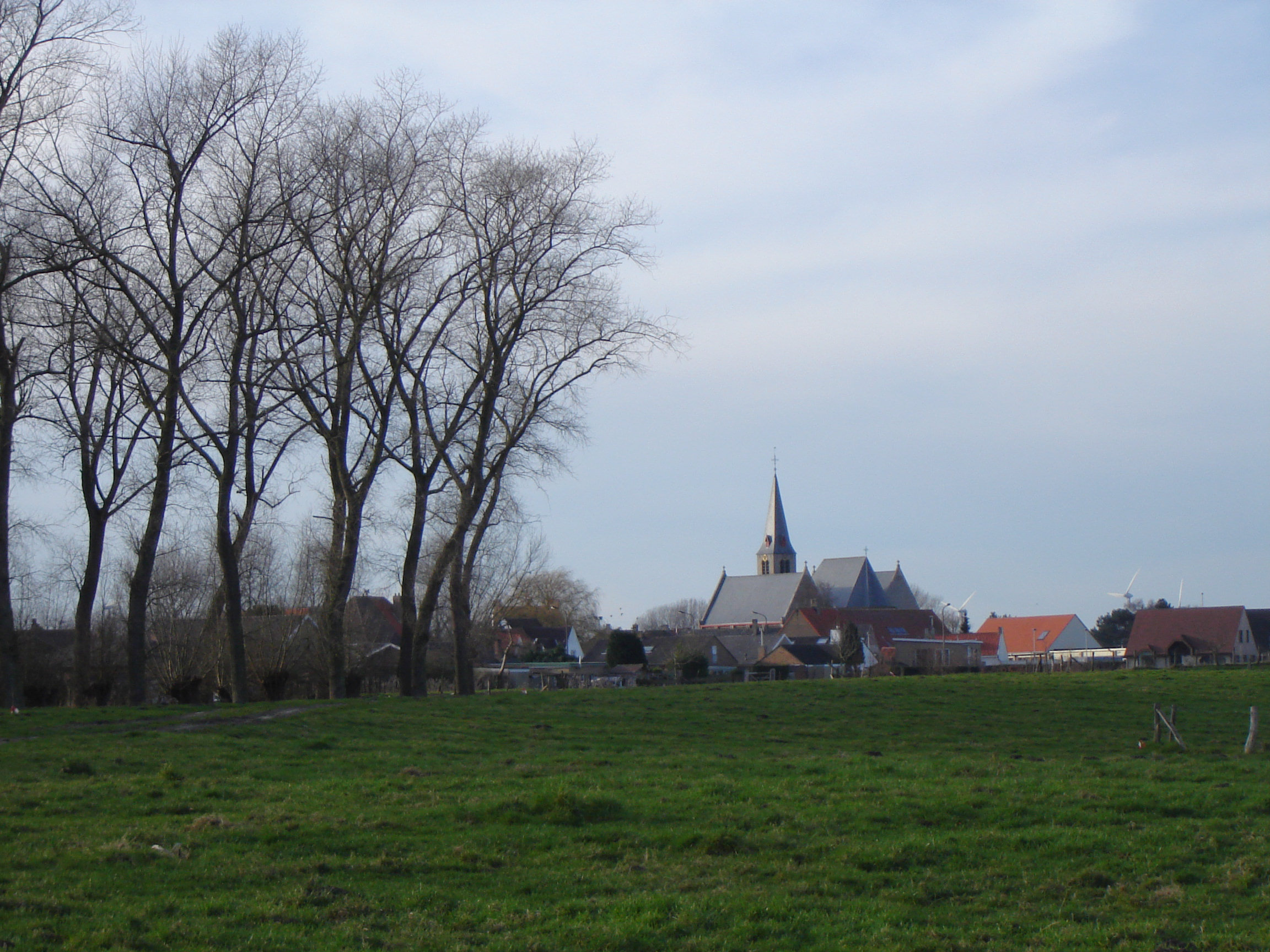
- View on Koolkerke

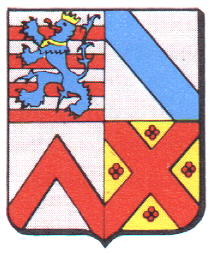
- Coat of arms
- Interactive map of Koolkerke
- Location within Belgium Location within West Flanders
- Coordinates: 51°14′30″N 3°14′59″E
- Country: Belgium
- Community: Flemish Community
- Region: Flemish Region
- Province: West Flanders
- Arrondissement: Bruges
- Municipality: Bruges

Area
  - Total: 4.17 km^{2} (1.61 sq mi)

Population (2014-12-31)
  - Total: 3,361
  - Density: 806/km^{2} (2,090/sq mi)
- Postal codes: 8000
- Area codes: 050

Koolkerke (Dutch pronunciation: [ˈkoːlˌkɛrkə]) is a sub-municipality of the city of Bruges located in the province of West Flanders, Flemish Region, Belgium. It was a separate municipality until 1971. On 1 January 1971, it was merged into Bruges.

== History ==
Although Roman remains have been found, the first written mention of the village Koolkerke dates from the 12th century. The name "Coolkercke" was first mentioned in 1243. The Old Zwin, a watercourse which connected Bruges to the Zwin in Knokke and the Nortsea, ran past the village. The Old Zwin silted up and was replaced by a canal constructed by the order of Napoleon. Two forts were built in the 17th century: Fort Lapin south of Koolkerke and the 'Fort de Bavière' or Fort van Beieren, the remains of this can be seen today.

It is believed that the name derives from Kool, a short version of the name Nicolas, hence from the church of St Nicholas. The church in Koolkerke was named by the settlement's founder, Nicolaas Gaillaerd.

Other local attractions include the old windmill Ter Panne, and the Groene Poort castle, Dudzeelse steenweg 460 (now called Château Rougesse).

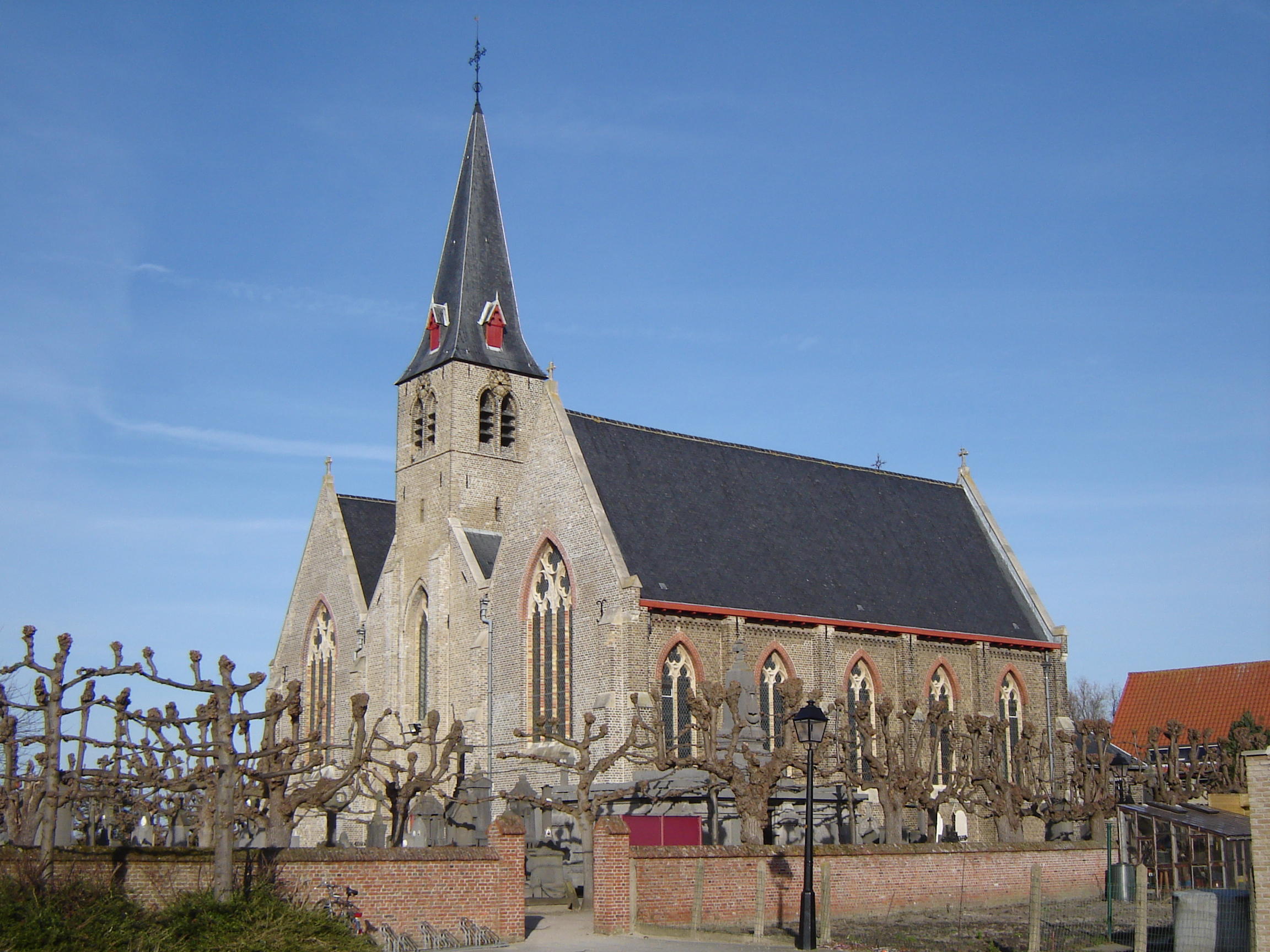
Sint-Niklaaskerk

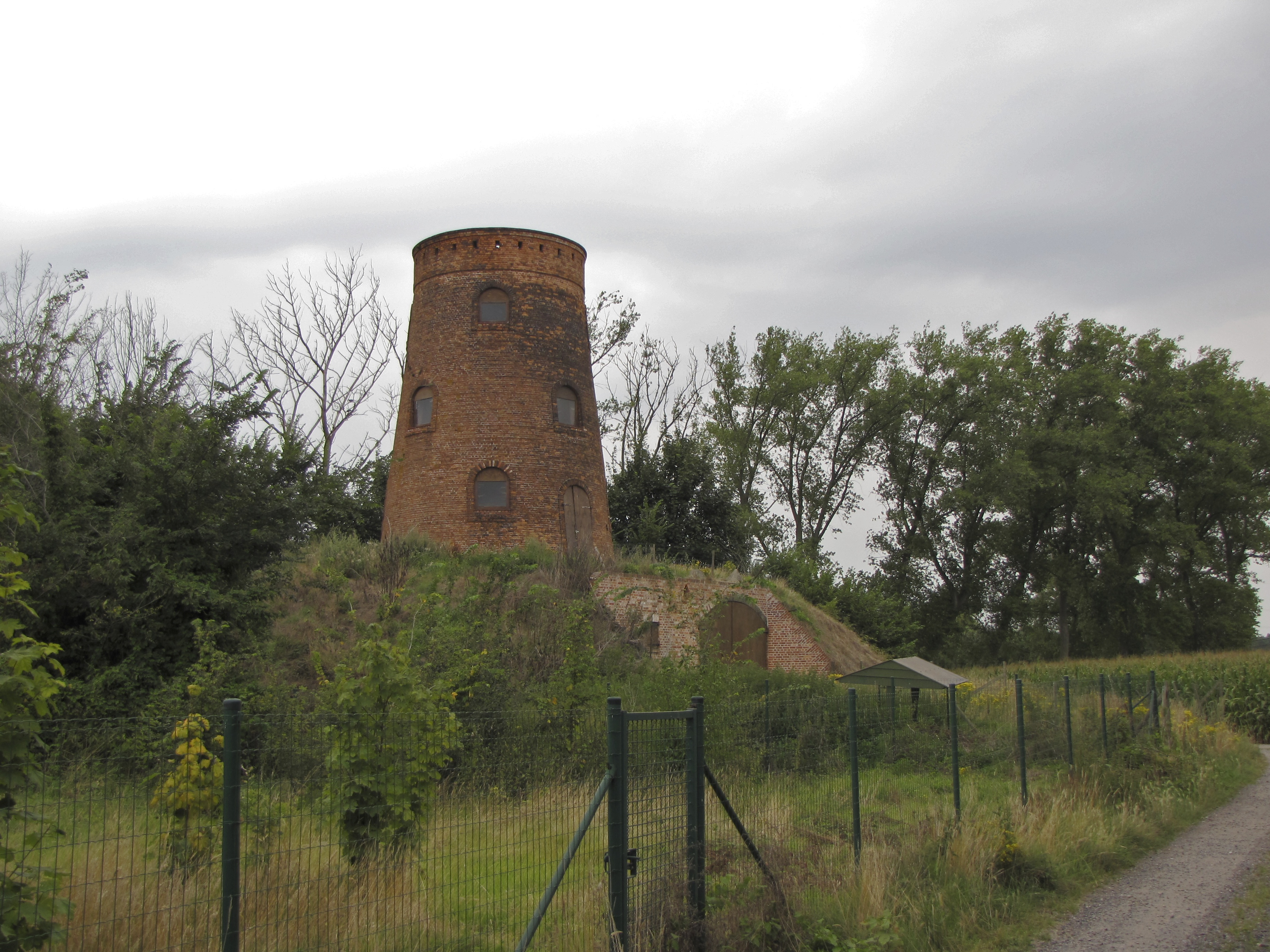
Ter Pannemolen of Gailliaertmolen

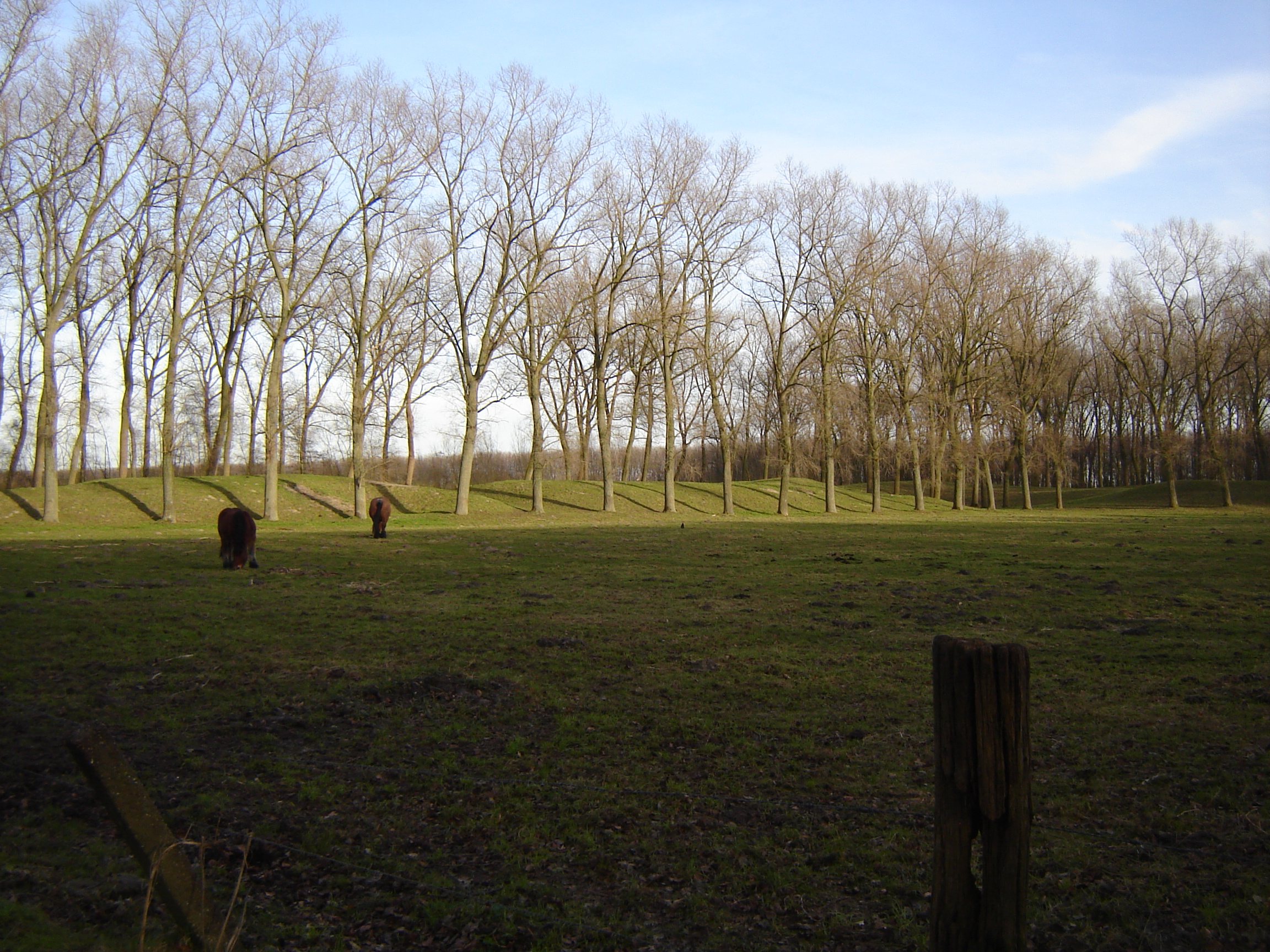
Fort van Beieren

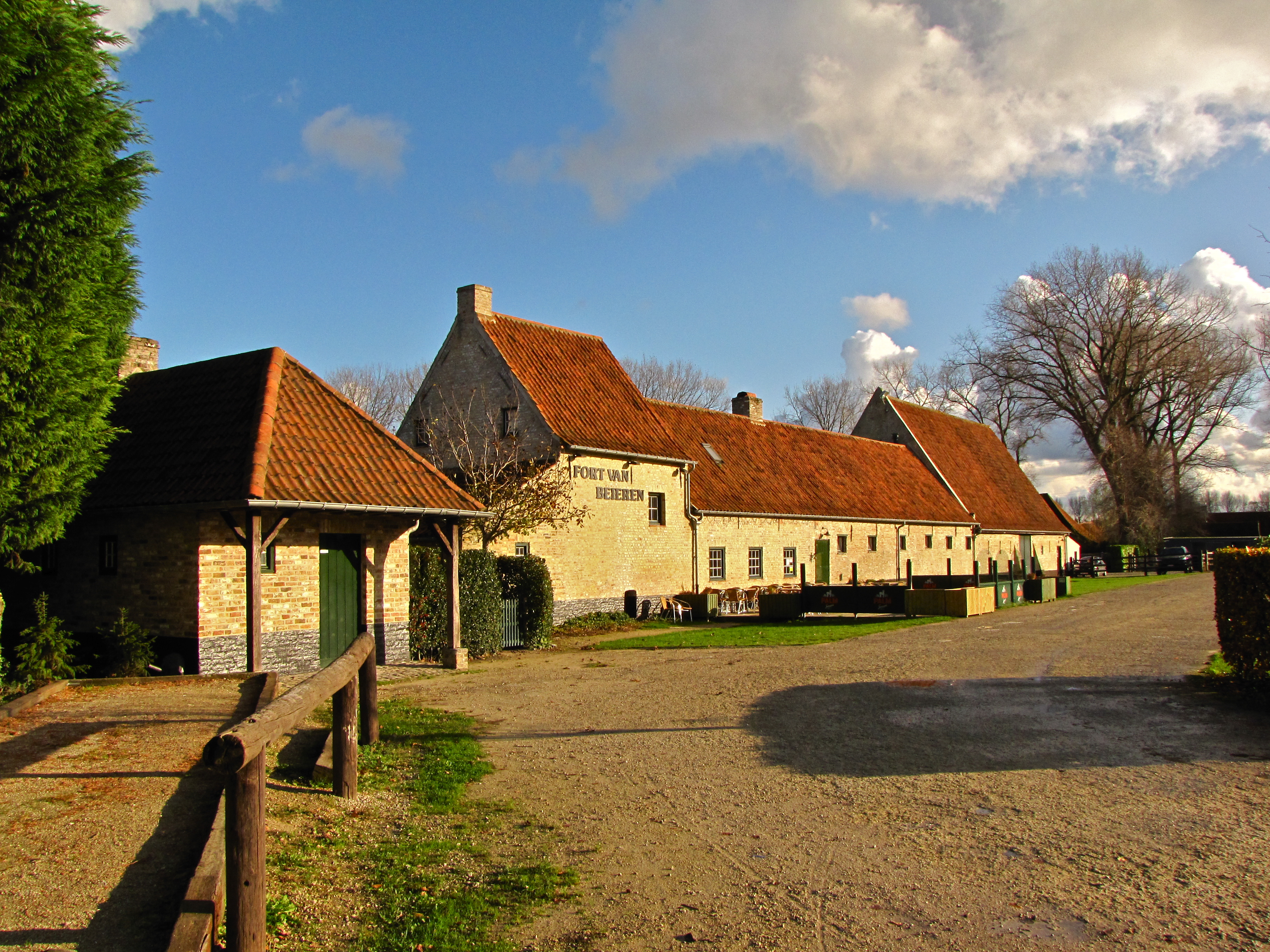
Hoeve Fort van Beieren
