= Gruuthuse manuscript =

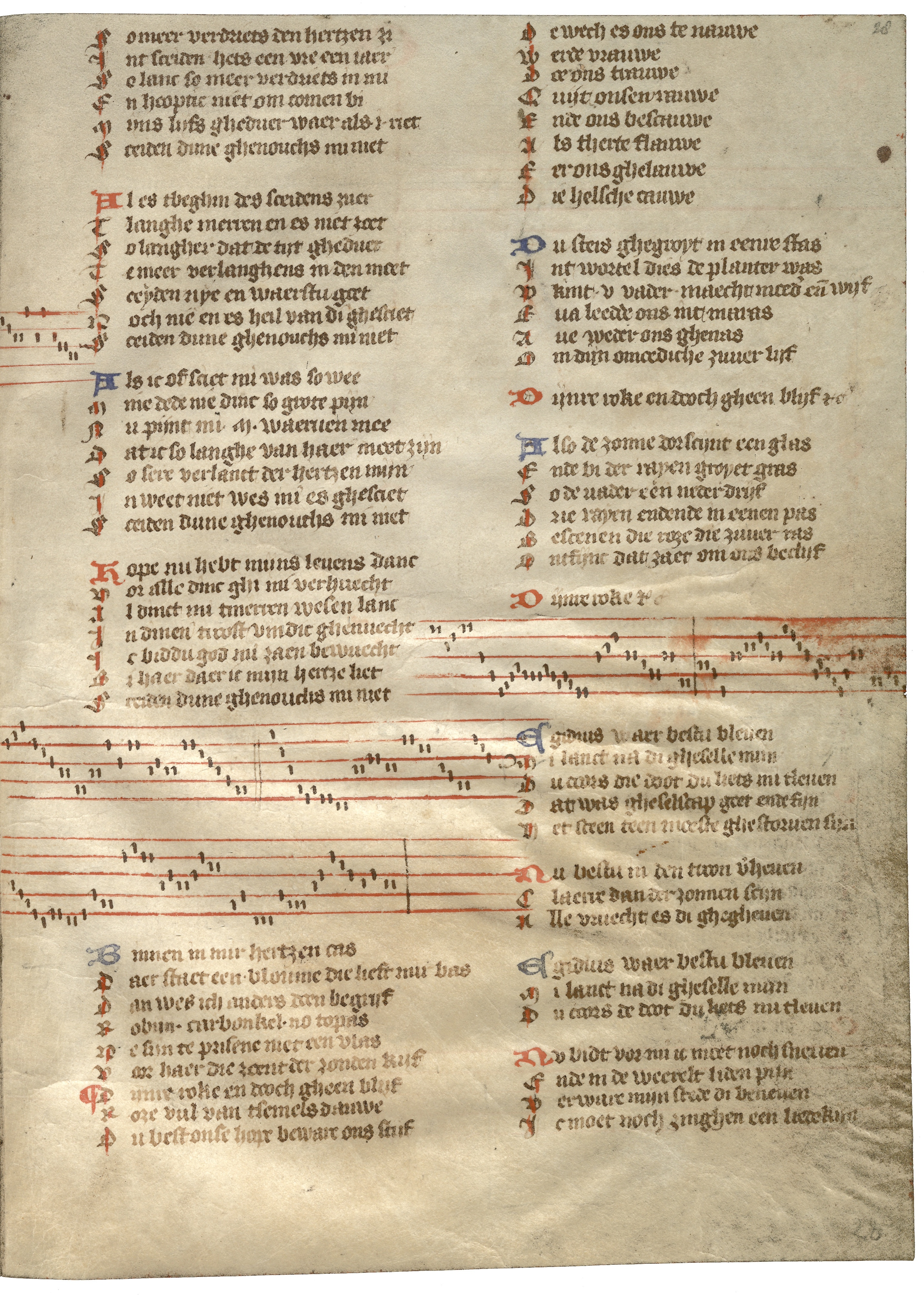
Page 28r of the Gruuthuuse manuscript with, to the bottom right, the Egidius song

The Gruuthuse manuscript is a medieval compilation, the oldest core of which is dated about 1395, while the youngest unfinished contributions date from around 1408. The manuscript is the only known source for a large number of Middle Dutch texts.

== About the manuscript ==
The Gruuthuse manuscript includes 147 songs provided with a simplified musical notation for one voice, 18 poems and 7 prayers put into rhyme. The Egidius song is one of the songs included as well as the Kerelslied. The Huygens Institute for the History of the Netherlands (Huygens ING) in The Hague is editing the manuscript, while the Royal Library of the Netherlands in The Hague put a digitised facsimile on its web site in 2007. In cooperation with the Huygens ING the Library in The Hague will also offer a transcription of all texts on the web site, with a commentary on the content and some audio files.

On 14 February 2007, the Dutch Royal Library in The Hague purchased the manuscript. Previously, the manuscript was owned by the family Van Caloen in Koolkerke near Bruges and conserved in their castle Ten Berghe. Through its purchase by the Dutch Royal Library, the manuscript became public property. Now, it is one of the summits of the collection of the Dutch Royal Library and is frequently exhibited. The Dutch Royal Library introduced its new web site on 1 March 2007, where the manuscript is reproduced in its entirety. From March to June 2013 the manuscript was on display in Brugge at the Gruuthusemuseum. The manuscript was loaned to Sint-Janshospitaal in Brugge from October 2022 to February 2023.

== Gruuthuse ==
After it had been discovered around 1840, the manuscript was known for a while as a manuscript of Oudvlaemsche liederen en gedichten (Old Flemish songs and poems). In the course of the 20th century, it was named after its first known owner, Lodewijk van Gruuthuse (ca. 1422-1492), whose coat of arms is painted in the bottom margins of the first written page. The patrician and diplomat Lodewijk of Gruuthuse was a collector of manuscripts. Mostly, he collected contemporary illuminated works, French manuscripts and books. The older Gruuthuse manuscript contains no French texts nor is it illuminated. Nevertheless, it must have been an important piece in his collection. It was only in the 17th or 18th century, that someone anonymously added his name, his coat of arms and his device (Plus est en Vous) and a number of comments about his membership of the Order of the Golden Fleece to the manuscript. How the manuscript came into possession of the family de Croeser in later times, and how it came through this family in that of the family van Caloen is still an unanswered question.

== Publication ==
- Het Gruuthuse-handschrift (Hs. Den Haag, Koninklijke Bibliotheek, 79 K 10), Ingeleid en kritisch uitgegeven door Herman Brinkman; met een uitgave van de melodieën door Ike de Loos (†), 869+488 blz. in 2 volumes, illustrated (colour), ISBN 978-90-8704-463-3, Uitgeverij Verloren, Hilversum, 2015

== Sources ==
- The Dutch article on the Gruuthuse manuscript on Wikipedia
