= List of peers 1230–1239 =

This page lists all peers who held extant titles between 1230 and 1239.

== Peerage of England ==
Title	Holder	Date gained	Date lost	Notes
Earl of Surrey (1088)	William de Warenne, 5th Earl of Surrey	1199	1240	
Earl of Warwick (1088)	Thomas de Beaumont, 6th Earl of Warwick	1229	1242	
Earl of Leicester (1107)	Simon de Montfort, 6th Earl of Leicester	1218	1265	
Earl of Chester (1121)	Ranulf de Blondeville, 6th Earl of Chester	1181	1232	1st Earl of Lincoln (1217)
Earl of Chester (1121)	Matilda of Chester	1232	1232	Died
Earl of Chester (1121)	John of Scotland, 7th Earl of Chester	1232	1237	Died, title became extinct
Earl of Gloucester (1122)	Gilbert de Clare, 5th Earl of Gloucester	1217	1230	4th Earl of Hertford; Died
Earl of Gloucester (1122)	Richard de Clare, 6th Earl of Gloucester	1230	1262	5th Earl of Hertford
Earl of Arundel (1138)	Hugh d'Aubigny, 5th Earl of Arundel	1224	1243	
Earl of Derby (1138)	William de Ferrers, 4th Earl of Derby	1190	1247	
Earl of Norfolk (1140)	Roger Bigod, 4th Earl of Norfolk	1225	1270	
Earl of Devon (1141)	Baldwin de Redvers, 6th Earl of Devon	1217	1245	
Earl of Oxford (1142)	Hugh de Vere, 4th Earl of Oxford	1221	1263	
Earl of Salisbury (1145)	Ela of Salisbury, 3rd Countess of Salisbury	1196	1261	
Earl of Pembroke (1189)	William Marshal, 2nd Earl of Pembroke	1219	1231	Died
Earl of Pembroke (1189)	Richard Marshal, 3rd Earl of Pembroke	1231	1234	Died
Earl of Pembroke (1189)	Gilbert Marshal, 4th Earl of Pembroke	1234	1241	
Earl of Hereford (1199)	Humphrey de Bohun, 2nd Earl of Hereford	1220	1275	1st Earl of Essex (1239)
Earl of Winchester (1207)	Roger de Quincy, 2nd Earl of Winchester	1219	1264	
Earl of Lincoln (1217)	Hawise of Chester, 1st Countess of Lincoln	1231	1232	Title gifted inter vivos to her daughter
Earl of Lincoln (1217)	John de Lacy, 2nd Earl of Lincoln and Margaret de Quincy, Countess of Lincoln	1232; 1232	1240; 1266	held jointly
Earl of Richmond (1219)	Peter de Braine, 1st Earl of Richmond	1219	1235	Title forfeited
Earl of Cornwall (1225)	Richard, 1st Earl of Cornwall	1225	1272	
Earl of Kent (1227)	Hubert de Burgh, 1st Earl of Kent	1227	1243	

== Peerage of Scotland ==
Title	Holder	Date gained	Date lost	Notes
Earl of Mar (1114)	Donnchadh, Earl of Mar	Abt. 1220	Abt. 1240	
Earl of Dunbar (1115)	Patrick I, Earl of Dunbar	1182	1232	Died
Earl of Dunbar (1115)	Patrick II, Earl of Dunbar	1232	1248	
Earl of Angus (1115)	Máel Coluim, Earl of Angus	1214	1240	
Earl of Atholl (1115)	Isabella, Countess of Atholl	1210	Abt. 1231	Died
Earl of Atholl (1115)	Padraig, Earl of Atholl	Abt. 1231	1241	
Earl of Buchan (1115)	Margaret, Countess of Buchan	Abt. 1195	Abt. 1243	
Earl of Strathearn (1115)	Robert, Earl of Strathearn	1223	1245	
Earl of Fife (1129)	Máel Coluim II, Earl of Fife	1228	1266	
Earl of Menteith (1160)	Muireadhach II, Earl of Menteith	Abt. 1213	Abt. 1230	Died
Earl of Menteith (1160)	Isabella, Countess of Menteith	Abt. 1230	1258	
Earl of Lennox (1184)	Maol Domhnaich, Earl of Lennox	1220	1260	
Earl of Carrick (1184)	Donnchadh, Earl of Carrick	1186	1250	
Earl of Ross (1215)	Fearchar, Earl of Ross	1215	1251	
Earl of Sutherland (1235)	William de Moravia, 1st Earl of Sutherland	1235	1248	New creation

== Peerage of Ireland ==
Title	Holder	Date gained	Date lost	Notes
Earl of Ulster (1205)	Hugh de Lacy, 1st Earl of Ulster	1205	1242	
Baron Athenry (1172)	Peter de Bermingham	1218	1244	
Baron Kingsale (1223)	Miles de Courcy, 1st Baron Kingsale	1223	1230	Died
Baron Kingsale (1223)	Patrick de Courcy, 2nd Baron Kingsale	1230	1260	
Baron Kerry (1223)	Thomas Fitzmaurice, 1st Baron Kerry	1223	1260	

Preceded by List of peers 1220–1229	Lists of peers by decade 1230–1239	Succeeded by List of peers 1240–1249
