= List of peers 1220–1229 =

This page lists all peers who held extant titles between 1220 and 1229.

== Peerage of England ==
Title	Holder	Date gained	Date lost	Notes
Earl of Surrey (1088)	William de Warenne, 5th Earl of Surrey	1199	1240	
Earl of Warwick (1088)	Henry de Beaumont, 5th Earl of Warwick	1203	1229	
Earl of Warwick (1088)	Thomas de Beaumont, 6th Earl of Warwick	1229	1242	
Earl of Leicester (1107)	Simon de Montfort, 6th Earl of Leicester	1218	1265	
Earl of Chester (1121)	Ranulf de Blondeville, 6th Earl of Chester	1181	1232	1st Earl of Lincoln (1217)
Earl of Gloucester (1122)	Gilbert de Clare, 5th Earl of Gloucester	1217	1230	4th Earl of Hertford
Earl of Arundel (1138)	William d'Aubigny, 3rd Earl of Arundel	1193	1221	Died
Earl of Arundel (1138)	William d'Aubigny, 4th Earl of Arundel	1221	1224	Died
Earl of Arundel (1138)	Hugh d'Aubigny, 5th Earl of Arundel	1224	1243	
Earl of Derby (1138)	William de Ferrers, 4th Earl of Derby	1190	1247	
Earl of Norfolk (1140)	Roger Bigod, 2nd Earl of Norfolk	1177	1221	Died
Earl of Norfolk (1140)	Hugh Bigod, 3rd Earl of Norfolk	1221	1225	Died
Earl of Norfolk (1140)	Roger Bigod, 4th Earl of Norfolk	1225	1270	
Earl of Devon (1141)	Baldwin de Redvers, 6th Earl of Devon	1217	1245	
Earl of Oxford (1142)	Robert de Vere, 3rd Earl of Oxford	1214	1221	Died
Earl of Oxford (1142)	Hugh de Vere, 4th Earl of Oxford	1221	1263	
Earl of Salisbury (1145)	William Longespée, 3rd Earl of Salisbury	1196	1226	Died
Earl of Salisbury (1145)	Ela of Salisbury, 3rd Countess of Salisbury	1196	1261	
Earl of Pembroke (1189)	William Marshal, 2nd Earl of Pembroke	1219	1231	
Earl of Essex (1199)	William FitzGeoffrey de Mandeville, 3rd Earl of Essex	1216	1227	Died, title became extinct
Earl of Hereford (1199)	Henry de Bohun, 1st Earl of Hereford	1199	1220	Died
Earl of Hereford (1199)	Humphrey de Bohun, 2nd Earl of Hereford	1220	1275	
Earl of Winchester (1207)	Roger de Quincy, 2nd Earl of Winchester	1219	1264	
Earl of Richmond (1219)	Peter de Braine, 1st Earl of Richmond	1219	1235	
Earl of Cornwall (1225)	Richard, 1st Earl of Cornwall	1225	1272	New creation
Earl of Kent (1227)	Hubert de Burgh, 1st Earl of Kent	1227	1243	New creation

== Peerage of Scotland ==
Title	Holder	Date gained	Date lost	Notes
Earl of Mar (1114)	Gille Críst, Earl of Mar	Abt. 1178	Abt. 1220	Died
Earl of Mar (1114)	Donnchadh, Earl of Mar	Abt. 1220	Abt. 1240	
Earl of Dunbar (1115)	Patrick I, Earl of Dunbar	1182	1232	
Earl of Angus (1115)	Máel Coluim, Earl of Angus	1214	1240	
Earl of Atholl (1115)	Isabella, Countess of Atholl	1210	Abt. 1231	
Earl of Buchan (1115)	Margaret, Countess of Buchan	Abt. 1195	Abt. 1243	
Earl of Strathearn (1115)	Gille Brigte, Earl of Strathearn	1171	1223	Died
Earl of Strathearn (1115)	Robert, Earl of Strathearn	1223	1245	
Earl of Fife (1129)	Máel Coluim I, Earl of Fife	1203	1228	Died
Earl of Fife (1129)	Máel Coluim II, Earl of Fife	1228	1266	
Earl of Menteith (1160)	Muireadhach II, Earl of Menteith	Abt. 1213	Abt. 1230	
Earl of Lennox (1184)	Ailín I, Earl of Lennox	1184	1220	Died
Earl of Lennox (1184)	Maol Domhnaich, Earl of Lennox	1220	1260	
Earl of Carrick (1184)	Donnchadh, Earl of Carrick	1186	1250	
Earl of Ross (1215)	Fearchar, Earl of Ross	1215	1251	

== Peerage of Ireland ==
Title	Holder	Date gained	Date lost	Notes
Earl of Ulster (1205)	Hugh de Lacy, 1st Earl of Ulster	1205	1242	
Baron Athenry (1172)	Peter de Bermingham	1218	1244	
Baron Kingsale (1223)	Miles de Courcy, 1st Baron Kingsale	1223	1230	New creation
Baron Kerry (1223)	Thomas Fitzmaurice, 1st Baron Kerry	1223	1260	New creation

Preceded by List of peers 1210–1219	Lists of peers by decade 1220–1229	Succeeded by List of peers 1230–1239
