= List of peers 1210–1219 =

This page lists all peers who held extant titles between 1210 and 1219.

== Peerage of England ==
Title	Holder	Date gained	Date lost	Notes
Earl of Surrey (1088)	William de Warenne, 5th Earl of Surrey	1199	1240	
Earl of Warwick (1088)	Henry de Beaumont, 5th Earl of Warwick	1203	1229	
Earl of Devon (1141)	William de Redvers, 5th Earl of Devon	1193	1217	Died
Earl of Devon (1141)	Baldwin de Redvers, 6th Earl of Devon	1217	1245	
Earl of Leicester (1107)	Simon de Montfort, 5th Earl of Leicester	1204°	1218	Died
Earl of Leicester (1107)	Simon de Montfort, 6th Earl of Leicester	1218	1265	
Earl of Chester (1121)	Randolph de Blondeville, 4th Earl of Chester	1181	1232	
Earl of Hertford (1135)	Richard de Clare, 4th Earl of Hertford	1173	1217	Died
Earl of Hertford (1135)	Gilbert de Clare, 5th Earl of Hertford	1217	1230	
Earl of Arundel (1138)	William d'Aubigny, 3rd Earl of Arundel	1193	1221	
Earl of Derby (1138)	William de Ferrers, 4th Earl of Derby	1190	1247	
Earl of Norfolk (1140)	Roger Bigod, 2nd Earl of Norfolk	1177	1221	
Earl of Oxford (1142)	Aubrey de Vere, 2nd Earl of Oxford	1194	1214	Died
Earl of Oxford (1142)	Robert de Vere, 3rd Earl of Oxford	1214	1221	
Earl of Salisbury (1145)	William Longespée, 3rd Earl of Salisbury	1196	1226	
Earl of Pembroke (1189)	William Marshal, 1st Earl of Pembroke	1189	1219	Died
Earl of Pembroke (1189)	William Marshal, 2nd Earl of Pembroke	1219	1231	
Earl of Essex (1199)	Geoffrey Fitz Peter, 1st Earl of Essex	1199	1213	Died
Earl of Essex (1199)	Geoffrey FitzGeoffrey de Mandeville, 2nd Earl of Essex	1213	1216	
Earl of Essex (1199)	William FitzGeoffrey de Mandeville, 3rd Earl of Essex	1216	1227	
Earl of Hereford (1199)	Henry de Bohun, 1st Earl of Hereford	1199	1220	
Earl of Winchester (1207)	Saer de Quincy, 1st Earl of Winchester	1207	1219	Died

== Peerage of Scotland ==
Title	Holder	Date gained	Date lost	Notes
Earl of Mar (1114)	Gille Críst, Earl of Mar	Abt. 1178	Abt. 1220	
Earl of Dunbar (1115)	Patrick I, Earl of Dunbar	1182	1232	
Earl of Angus (1115)	Gille Críst, Earl of Angus	1197	Abt. 1210	Died
Earl of Angus (1115)	Donnchadh, Earl of Angus	Abt. 1210	1214	Died
Earl of Angus (1115)	Máel Coluim, Earl of Angus	1214	1240	
Earl of Atholl (1115)	Henry, Earl of Atholl	Abt 1190	1210	Died
Earl of Atholl (1115)	Isabella, Countess of Atholl	1210	Abt. 1231	
Earl of Buchan (1115)	Margaret, Countess of Buchan	Abt. 1195	Abt. 1243	
Earl of Strathearn (1115)	Gille Brigte, Earl of Strathearn	1171	1223	
Earl of Fife (1129)	Máel Coluim I, Earl of Fife	1203	1228	
Earl of Menteith (1160)	Muireadhach I, Earl of Menteith	Abt. 1190	Abt. 1213	Died
Earl of Menteith (1160)	Muireadhach II, Earl of Menteith	Abt. 1213	Abt. 1230	
Earl of Lennox (1184)	Ailín I, Earl of Lennox	1184	1220	
Earl of Carrick (1184)	Donnchadh, Earl of Carrick	1186	1250	
Earl of Ross (1215)	Fearchar, Earl of Ross	1215	1251	New creation

== Peerage of Ireland ==
Title	Holder	Date gained	Date lost	Notes
Earl of Ulster (1205)	Hugh de Lacy, 1st Earl of Ulster	1205	1242	
Baron Athenry (1172)	Robert de Bermingham	1172	1218	Died
Baron Athenry (1172)	Peter de Bermingham	1218	1244	

== Notes ==
- The transfer of the Earldom of Leicester was confirmed in 1207, although the fourth earl died in 1204. See Earl of Leicester.

Preceded by List of peers 1200–1209	Lists of peers by decade 1210–1219	Succeeded by List of peers 1220–1229
