= List of peers 1200–1209 =

This page lists all peers who held extant titles between 1200 and 1209.

== Peerage of England ==
| Title | Holder | Date gained | Date lost | Notes |
|---|---|---|---|---|
| Earl of Surrey (1088) | William de Warenne, 5th Earl of Surrey | 1199 | 1240 | |
| Earl of Warwick (1088) | Waleran de Beaumont, 4th Earl of Warwick | 1184 | 1203° | Died |
| Earl of Warwick (1088) | Henry de Beaumont, 5th Earl of Warwick | 1203 | 1229 | |
| Earl of Devon (1141) | William de Redvers, 5th Earl of Devon | 1193 | 1217 | |
| Earl of Leicester (1107) | Robert de Beaumont, 4th Earl of Leicester | 1190 | 1204 | Died |
| Earl of Leicester (1107) | Simon de Montfort, 5th Earl of Leicester | 1204° | 1218 | |
| Earl of Chester (1121) | Randolph de Blondeville, 4th Earl of Chester | 1181 | 1232 | |
| Earl of Hertford (1135) | Richard de Clare, 4th Earl of Hertford | 1173 | 1217 | |
| Earl of Richmond (1136) | Constance of Brittany | 1171 | 1201 | Died |
| Earl of Richmond (1136) | Arthur of Brittany | 1201 | 1203 | Died |
| Earl of Richmond (1136) | Eleanor, 5th Countess of Richmond° | 1203 | 1236 | |
| Earl of Arundel (1138) | William d'Aubigny, 3rd Earl of Arundel | 1193 | 1221 | |
| Earl of Derby (1138) | William de Ferrers, 4th Earl of Derby | 1190 | 1247 | |
| Earl of Norfolk (1140) | Roger Bigod, 2nd Earl of Norfolk | 1177 | 1221 | |
| Earl of Oxford (1142) | Aubrey de Vere, 2nd Earl of Oxford | 1194 | 1214 | |
| Earl of Salisbury (1145) | William Longespée, 3rd Earl of Salisbury | 1196 | 1226 | |
| Earl of Pembroke (1189) | William Marshal, 1st Earl of Pembroke | 1189 | 1219 | |
| Earl of Essex (1199) | Geoffrey Fitzpeter, 1st Earl of Essex | 1199 | 1213 | |
| Earl of Hereford (1199) | Henry de Bohun, 1st Earl of Hereford | 1199 | 1220 | |
| Earl of Winchester (1207) | Saer de Quincy, 1st Earl of Winchester | 1207 | 1219 | New creation |

== Peerage of Scotland ==
| Title | Holder | Date gained | Date lost | Notes |
|---|---|---|---|---|
| Earl of Mar (1114) | Gille Críst, Earl of Mar | Abt. 1178 | Abt. 1220 | |
| Earl of Dunbar (1115) | Patrick I, Earl of Dunbar | 1182 | 1232 | |
| Earl of Angus (1115) | Gille Críst, Earl of Angus | 1197 | Abr. 1210 | |
| Earl of Atholl (1115) | Henry, Earl of Atholl | Abt 1190 | 1210 | |
| Earl of Buchan (1115) | Margaret, Countess of Buchan | Abt. 1195 | Abt. 1243 | |
| Earl of Strathearn (1115) | Gille Brigte, Earl of Strathearn | 1171 | 1223 | |
| Earl of Fife (1129) | Donnchad II, Earl of Fife | 1154 | 1203 | Died |
| Earl of Fife (1129) | Máel Coluim I, Earl of Fife | 1203 | 1228 | |
| Earl of Menteith (1160) | Muireadhach I, Earl of Menteith | Abt. 1190 | Abt. 1213 | |
| Earl of Lennox (1184) | Ailín I, Earl of Lennox | 1184 | 1220 | |
| Earl of Carrick (1184) | Donnchadh, Earl of Carrick | 1186 | 1250 | |

== Peerage of Ireland ==
| Title | Holder | Date gained | Date lost | Notes |
|---|---|---|---|---|
| Earl of Ulster (1205) | Hugh de Lacy, 1st Earl of Ulster | 1205 | 1242 | New creation |
| Baron Athenry (1172) | Robert de Bermingham | 1172 | 1218 | |

== Notes ==
- The Earl of Warwick's death date cannot be defined with precision. See Earl of Warwick.
- The transfer of the Earldom of Leicester was confirmed in 1207, although the fourth earl died in 1204. See Earl of Leicester.
- Only some affirmed the claim that Eleanor succeeded her brother, Arthur, to the title; see Earl of Richmond.

| Preceded by List of peers 1190–1199 | Lists of peers by decade 1200–1209 | Succeeded by List of peers 1210–1219 |
