= List of peers 1190–1199 =

This page lists all peers who held extant titles between 1190 and 1199.

== Peerage of England ==
Title	Holder	Date gained	Date lost	Notes
Earl of Surrey (1088)	Isabel de Warenne, 4th Countess of Surrey	1148	1199	Died
Earl of Surrey (1088)	William de Warenne, 5th Earl of Surrey	1199	1240	
Earl of Warwick (1088)	Waleran de Beaumont, 4th Earl of Warwick	1184	1203	
Earl of Devon (1141)	Richard de Redvers, 4th Earl of Devon	1188	1193	Died
Earl of Devon (1141)	William de Redvers, 5th Earl of Devon	1193	1217	
Earl of Leicester (1107)	Robert de Beaumont, 3rd Earl of Leicester	1168	1190	Died
Earl of Leicester (1107)	Robert de Beaumont, 4th Earl of Leicester	1190	1204	
Earl of Chester (1121)	Ranulf de Blondeville, 6th Earl of Chester	1181	1232	
Earl of Hertford (1135)	Richard de Clare, 4th Earl of Hertford	1173	1217	
Earl of Richmond (1136)	Constance of Brittany	1171	1201	
Earl of Arundel (1138)	William d'Aubigny, 2nd Earl of Arundel	1176	1193	Died
Earl of Arundel (1138)	William d'Aubigny, 3rd Earl of Arundel	1193	1221	
Earl of Derby (1138)	William de Ferrers, 3rd Earl of Derby	1162	1190	Died
Earl of Derby (1138)	William de Ferrers, 4th Earl of Derby	1190	1247	
Earl of Norfolk (1140)	Roger Bigod, 2nd Earl of Norfolk	1177	1221	
Earl of Oxford (1142)	Aubrey de Vere, 1st Earl of Oxford	1142	1194	Died
Earl of Oxford (1142)	Aubrey de Vere, 2nd Earl of Oxford	1194	1214	
Earl of Salisbury (1145)	William of Salisbury, 2nd Earl of Salisbury	1168	1196	Died
Earl of Salisbury (1145)	William Longespée, 3rd Earl of Salisbury	1196	1226	
Earl of Gloucester (1186)	John of England	1189	1199	Merged in crown
Earl of Cornwall (1189)	John of England	1189	1199	Merged in crown
Earl of Pembroke (1189)	William Marshal, 1st Earl of Pembroke	1189	1219	
Earl of Essex (1199)	Geoffrey Fitzpeter, 1st Earl of Essex	1199	1213	New creation
Earl of Hereford (1199)	Henry de Bohun, 1st Earl of Hereford	1199	1220	New creation

== Peerage of Scotland ==
Title	Holder	Date gained	Date lost	Notes
Earl of Mar (1114)	Gille Críst, Earl of Mar	Abt. 1178	Abt. 1220	
Earl of Dunbar (1115)	Patrick I, Earl of Dunbar	1182	1232	
Earl of Angus (1115)	Adam, Earl of Angus	1187	1197	Died
Earl of Angus (1115)	Gille Críst, Earl of Angus	1197	Abr. 1210	
Earl of Atholl (1115)	Máel Coluim, Earl of Atholl	Abt 1150	Abt 1190	Died
Earl of Atholl (1115)	Henry, Earl of Atholl	Abt 1190	1210	
Earl of Buchan (1115)	Roger, Earl of Buchan	Abt. 1180	Abt. 1190	Died
Earl of Buchan (1115)	Fergus, Earl of Buchan	Abt. 1190	Abt. 1195	Died
Earl of Buchan (1115)	Margaret, Countess of Buchan	Abt. 1195	Abt. 1243	
Earl of Strathearn (1115)	Gille Brigte, Earl of Strathearn	1171	1223	
Earl of Fife (1129)	Donnchad II, Earl of Fife	1154	1203	
Earl of Menteith (1160)	Gille Críst, Earl of Menteith	Abt. 1160	Abt. 1190	Died
Earl of Menteith (1160)	Muireadhach I, Earl of Menteith	Abt. 1190	Abt. 1213	
Earl of Lennox (1184)	Ailín I, Earl of Lennox	1184	1220	
Earl of Carrick (1184)	Donnchadh, Earl of Carrick	1186	1250	

== Peerage of Ireland ==
Title	Holder	Date gained	Date lost	Notes
Baron Athenry (1172)	Robert de Bermingham	1172	1218	

Preceded by List of peers 1180–1189	Lists of peers by decade 1190–1199	Succeeded by List of peers 1200–1209
