= List of peers 1250–1259 =

This page lists all peers who held extant titles between 1250 and 1259.

== Peerage of England ==
Title	Holder	Date gained	Date lost	Notes
Earl of Surrey (1088)	John de Warenne, 6th Earl of Surrey	1240	1304	
Earl of Warwick (1088)	Margaret de Newburg, 7th Countess of Warwick	1242	1253	Died
Earl of Warwick (1088)	William Maudit, 8th Earl of Warwick	1253	1267	
Earl of Leicester (1107)	Simon de Montfort, 6th Earl of Leicester	1218	1265	
Earl of Gloucester (1122)	Richard de Clare, 6th Earl of Gloucester	1230	1262	5th Earl of Hertford
Earl of Arundel (1138)	John FitzAlan, 6th Earl of Arundel	1243	1267	
Earl of Derby (1138)	William de Ferrers, 5th Earl of Derby	1247	1254	Died
Earl of Derby (1138)	Robert de Ferrers, 6th Earl of Derby	1254	1279	
Earl of Norfolk (1140)	Roger Bigod, 4th Earl of Norfolk	1225	1270	
Earl of Devon (1141)	Baldwin de Redvers, 7th Earl of Devon	1245	1262	
Earl of Oxford (1142)	Hugh de Vere, 4th Earl of Oxford	1221	1263	
Earl of Salisbury (1145)	Ela of Salisbury, 3rd Countess of Salisbury	1196	1261	
Earl of Hereford (1199)	Humphrey de Bohun, 2nd Earl of Hereford	1220	1275	1st Earl of Essex (1239)
Earl of Winchester (1207)	Roger de Quincy, 2nd Earl of Winchester	1219	1264	
Earl of Lincoln (1217)	Margaret de Quincy, Countess of Lincoln	1232	1266	
Earl of Cornwall (1225)	Richard, 1st Earl of Cornwall	1225	1272	
Earl of Richmond (1241)	Peter of Savoy, 1st Earl of Richmond	1241	1268	
Earl of Pembroke (1247)	William de Valence, 1st Earl of Pembroke	1247	1296	
Earl of Chester (1253)	Edward, Earl of Chester	1253	1272	New creation

== Peerage of Scotland ==
Title	Holder	Date gained	Date lost	Notes
Earl of Mar (1114)	Uilleam, Earl of Mar	Abt. 1240	1281	
Earl of Dunbar (1115)	Patrick III, Earl of Dunbar	1248	1289	
Earl of Angus (1115)	Gilbert de Umfraville, Earl of Angus	1246	1307	
Earl of Atholl (1115)	Forbhlaith, Countess of Atholl	1241	Abt. 1250	Died
Earl of Atholl (1115)	Ada, Countess of Atholl	Abt. 1250	1264	
Earl of Buchan (1115)	Alexander Comyn, Earl of Buchan	Abt. 1243	1289	
Earl of Strathearn (1115)	Maol Íosa II, Earl of Strathearn	1245	1271	
Earl of Fife (1129)	Máel Coluim II, Earl of Fife	1228	1266	
Earl of Menteith (1160)	Isabella, Countess of Menteith	Abt. 1230	1258	Died
Earl of Menteith (1160)	Mary I, Countess of Menteith	1258	1295	
Earl of Lennox (1184)	Maol Domhnaich, Earl of Lennox	1220	1260	
Earl of Carrick (1184)	Donnchadh, Earl of Carrick	1186	1250	Died
Earl of Carrick (1184)	Niall, Earl of Carrick	1250	1256	Died
Earl of Carrick (1184)	Marjorie, Countess of Carrick	1256	1292	
Earl of Ross (1215)	Fearchar, Earl of Ross	1215	1251	Died
Earl of Ross (1215)	Uilleam I, Earl of Ross	1251	1274	
Earl of Sutherland (1235)	William de Moravia, 2nd Earl of Sutherland	1248	1307	

== Peerage of Ireland ==
Title	Holder	Date gained	Date lost	Notes
Baron Athenry (1172)	Meyler de Bermingham	1244	1262	
Baron Kingsale (1223)	Patrick de Courcy, 2nd Baron Kingsale	1230	1260	
Baron Kerry (1223)	Thomas Fitzmaurice, 1st Baron Kerry	1223	1260	

Preceded by List of peers 1240–1249	Lists of peers by decade 1250–1259	Succeeded by List of peers 1260–1269
