= List of peers 1260–1269 =

This page lists all peers who held extant titles between 1260 and 1269.

== Peerage of England ==
Title	Holder	Date gained	Date lost	Notes
Earl of Surrey (1088)	John de Warenne, 6th Earl of Surrey	1240	1304	
Earl of Warwick (1088)	William Maudit, 8th Earl of Warwick	1253	1267	Died
Earl of Warwick (1088)	William de Beauchamp, 9th Earl of Warwick	1267	1298	
Earl of Leicester (1107)	Simon de Montfort, 6th Earl of Leicester	1218	1265	Attainted, and the title became forfeited
Earl of Gloucester (1122)	Richard de Clare, 6th Earl of Gloucester	1230	1262	5th Earl of Hertford; Died
Earl of Gloucester (1122)	Gilbert de Clare, 7th Earl of Gloucester	1262	1295	6th Earl of Hertford
Earl of Arundel (1138)	John FitzAlan, 6th Earl of Arundel	1243	1267	Died
Earl of Arundel (1138)	John FitzAlan, 7th Earl of Arundel	1267	1272	
Earl of Derby (1138)	Robert de Ferrers, 6th Earl of Derby	1254	1266	Title became forfeited
Earl of Norfolk (1140)	Roger Bigod, 4th Earl of Norfolk	1225	1270	
Earl of Devon (1141)	Baldwin de Redvers, 7th Earl of Devon	1245	1262	Died
Earl of Devon (1141)	Isabella de Fortibus, Countess of Devon	1262	1293	
Earl of Oxford (1142)	Hugh de Vere, 4th Earl of Oxford	1221	1263	Died
Earl of Oxford (1142)	Robert de Vere, 5th Earl of Oxford	1263	1297	
Earl of Salisbury (1145)	Ela of Salisbury, 3rd Countess of Salisbury	1196	1261	Died
Earl of Salisbury (1145)	Margaret Longespée, 4th Countess of Salisbury	1261	1310	
Earl of Hereford (1199)	Humphrey de Bohun, 2nd Earl of Hereford	1220	1275	1st Earl of Essex (1239)
Earl of Winchester (1207)	Roger de Quincy, 2nd Earl of Winchester	1219	1264	Died, title became extinct
Earl of Lincoln (1217)	Margaret de Quincy, Countess of Lincoln	1232	1266	Died
Earl of Lincoln (1217)	Henry de Lacy, 3rd Earl of Lincoln	1266	1311	
Earl of Cornwall (1225)	Richard, 1st Earl of Cornwall	1225	1272	
Earl of Richmond (1241)	Peter of Savoy, 1st Earl of Richmond	1241	1268	
Earl of Pembroke (1247)	William de Valence, 1st Earl of Pembroke	1247	1296	
Earl of Chester (1253)	Edward, Earl of Chester	1253	1272	
Earl of Leicester (1265)	Edmund Plantagenet, 1st Earl of Leicester	1267	1296	New creation; 1st Earl of Lancaster (1267)
Earl of Richmond (1268)	John I, Duke of Brittany	1268	1268	New creation; surrendered the title to his son
Earl of Richmond (1268)	John II, Duke of Brittany	1268	1305	
Baron de Ros (1264)	Robert de Ros	1264	1285	New creation
Baron le Despencer (1264)	Hugh le Despencer, 1st Baron le Despencer	1264	1265	New creation; Died
Baron le Despencer (1264)	Hugh le Despencer, 2nd Baron le Despencer	1265	1326	
Baron Basset of Drayton (1264)	Ralph Basset, 1st Baron Basset of Drayton	1264	1264	New creation; Died
Baron Basset of Drayton (1264)	Ralph Basset, 2nd Baron Basset of Drayton	1265	1299	
Baron Basset of Sapcote (1264)	Ralph Basset, 1st Baron Basset of Sapcote	1264	1282	New creation
Baron Marmion (1264)	William Marmion	1264	1265	New creation for leading rebel. Not recalled after the Battle of Evesham.

== Peerage of Scotland ==
Title	Holder	Date gained	Date lost	Notes
Earl of Mar (1114)	Uilleam, Earl of Mar	Abt. 1240	1281	
Earl of Dunbar (1115)	Patrick III, Earl of Dunbar	1248	1289	
Earl of Angus (1115)	Gilbert de Umfraville, Earl of Angus	1246	1307	
Earl of Atholl (1115)	Ada, Countess of Atholl	Abt. 1250	1264	Died
Earl of Atholl (1115)	David I Strathbogie, Earl of Atholl	1264	1270	
Earl of Buchan (1115)	Alexander Comyn, Earl of Buchan	Abt. 1243	1289	
Earl of Strathearn (1115)	Maol Íosa II, Earl of Strathearn	1245	1271	
Earl of Fife (1129)	Máel Coluim II, Earl of Fife	1228	1266	Died
Earl of Fife (1129)	Colbán, Earl of Fife	1266	1270	
Earl of Menteith (1160)	Mary I, Countess of Menteith	1258	1295	
Earl of Lennox (1184)	Maol Domhnaich, Earl of Lennox	1220	1260	Died
Earl of Lennox (1184)	Maol Choluim I, Earl of Lennox	1260	1291	
Earl of Carrick (1184)	Marjorie, Countess of Carrick	1256	1292	
Earl of Ross (1215)	Uilleam I, Earl of Ross	1251	1274	
Earl of Sutherland (1235)	William de Moravia, 2nd Earl of Sutherland	1248	1307	

== Peerage of Ireland ==
Title	Holder	Date gained	Date lost	Notes
Earl of Ulster (1264)	Walter de Burgh, 1st Earl of Ulster	1264	1271	New creation
Baron Athenry (1172)	Meyler de Bermingham	1244	1262	Died
Baron Athenry (1172)	Peter de Bermingham	1262	1307	
Baron Kingsale (1223)	Patrick de Courcy, 2nd Baron Kingsale	1230	1260	Died
Baron Kingsale (1223)	Nicholas de Courcy, 3rd Baron Kingsale	1260	1290	
Baron Kerry (1223)	Thomas Fitzmaurice, 1st Baron Kerry	1223	1260	Died
Baron Kerry (1223)	Maurice Fitzthomas Fitzmaurice, 2nd Baron Kerry	1260	1303	
Baron Barry (1261)	David de Barry, 1st Baron Barry	1261	1278	New creation

Preceded by List of peers 1250–1259	Lists of peers by decade 1260–1269	Succeeded by List of peers 1270–1279
