= Gospatric =

Gospatric or Cospatric is a personal name of Brittonic origin, from Gwas-Patric, meaning "devotee or servant of Saint Patrick", and may refer to:

== People ==
- Gospatric, Earl of Northumbria (died after 1073), nobleman and ancestor of the Earls of Dunbar
- Gospatric II, Earl of Lothian (died 1138), Earl of Lothian and Dunbar
- Gospatric III, Earl of Lothian (died 1166), Earl of Lothian and Dunbar
- Gospatric (sheriff of Roxburgh), sheriff in Teviotdale in the early 12th century
- Cospatrick Douglas-Home, 11th Earl of Home (1799–1881), Scottish diplomat and politician

== Other uses ==
- Cospatrick (ship), a wooden sailing ship that caught fire south of the Cape of Good Hope in 1874 with the loss of 470 lives
