= Sir Colin Og Campbell of Lochawe =

Scottish nobleman (died 1340)

Sir Colin Og Campbell of Lochawe (died 1340 at Locale Argyle), also known as Cailean Óg Caimbeul, Sir Colyn Cambel, Colin the Young, and Coline Oig Campbell, was an early member of Clan Campbell and patrilineal ancestor of the Earls of Argyll. He was lord of Lochawe and Ardscotnish from 1316 until his death sometime before 1343.

== Life ==
Colin was the oldest son of Sir Neil Campbell and his first wife, likely Alyse Crawford. His stepmother was Mary Bruce, sister of king Robert the Bruce. It has been theorized that Cailean of Carrick was Colin's great-great grandfather, which would also make Robert the Bruce his second cousin once removed. Tradition has it that William Wallace's mother was Margaret Crawford, which if accurate, would make Wallace and Colin first cousins once removed.

In 1316, shortly after his father's death, Colin was granted the entirety of Lochawe and Ardscotnish (lands along the shore of Loch Awe) as a free barony by Robert the Bruce. In exchange for this, Colin agreed to provide troops for Robert's army and a single 40-oared ship when requested. He served in Robert's army during the Irish campaign of 1315-1318. The Brus relates a tale from this campaign in which Colin disobeyed Robert's orders and charged a pair of English archers. While Colin killed the first archer, the second killed Colin's horse. Robert himself intervened, riding to Colin and hitting him with a truncheon as punishment. During the reign of Edward Balliol, Colin sided with David II. Amidst the struggle, Dunoon Castle was captured by a force led by members of the Campbell clan, possibly Colin, and has remained held by the family ever since (though mostly in ruins today).

== Marriage and issue ==
Colin married a woman named Helena. Ane Accompt of the Genealogie of the Campbells identifies her as the daughter of John More and associates her with the Earldom of Lennox. A History of Clan Campbell identifies her as daughter of John de Menteith, who briefly held the Earldom of Lennox title. Colin and Helena had the following children:

- Archibald (died before 1394)
- Dougal (died before 1342)
- John
- Alicia, married Alan Lauder of Haltoun

Colin also had an illegitimate son Neil with a woman from the McIldowie family through whom the Campbells of Kenmore and Melfort descend. Through Archibald descend the Earls of Argyll.
