= Archibald Campbell of Lochawe =

Sir Archibald Campbell of Lochawe (died before 1394), also known as Gillespic Campbell, and Gillespig More, was an early member of Clan Campbell and patrilineal ancestor of the Earls of Argyll.

== Life ==
Archibald was the son of Sir Colin Og Campbell of Lochawe and his wife Helena, a possible daughter of John de Menteith. He became Lord of Lochawe either through inheritance from his father or the disenfranchisement of his brother, Dougall. In 1342, King David II granted Archibald the forfeited lands of his brother Dougall as well as the barony of Melfort. Melfort was in turn granted to Archibald's half-brother Neil, from whom the Campbells of Kenmore and Melfort descend. In the 1350s, Archibald was granted numerous properties in Argyll by John, Lord of Menteith and John's cousin Mary de Menteith, most notably Castle Sween. In 1373, he received the lands of Finnart and Stronewhillen from Paul Glenn. In 1382, he and his son, Colin, were appointed the hereditary position of King's Lieutenants and Special Commissioners in the Sheriffdom of Argyll, which would provide them income in exchange for performing various bureaucratic duties.

== Marriage and issue ==
According to Ane Accompt of the Genealogie of the Campbells, Archibald married Isabella, daughter of John Lamont. She is referred to as Mary in other sources. Archibald and Isabella had the following children:

- Sir Colin 'Iongantach' Campbell of Lochawe, father of Duncan (1st Lord Campbell)
- Helena Campbell
- Duncan 'Skeodanasach' (or Skeodnish) Campbell

Through Colin descend the Earls of Argyll. Helena married firstly John MacDonald, son of John of Islay and had a son named Angus. She married secondly Donnchadh, Earl of Lennox and had issue. Duncan earned his honorific Skeodanasach for having been raised by Clan Malcolm in Ardscotnish; the MacConnochie Campbells of Inverawe are said to descend from him.

== Sources ==
- Campbell of Airds, Alastair (15 June 2000). A History of Clan Campbell. Vol. 1: From Origins to the Battle of Flodden. Edinburgh, Scotland: Polygon. ISBN 978-1902930176.
- MacPhail, J. R. N. (March 1916). Highland Papers, Volume II (PDF). Publications of the Scottish Historical Society. Vol. XII (Second Series ed.). Edinburgh, Scotland: University Press. pp. 72–114. ISBN 978-0788400438.
- Collins, Arthur (1741). The Peerage of England: Containing a Genealogical and Historical Account of All the Peers of that Kingdom, Now Existing, Either by Tenure, Summons, Or Creation, Their Descents and Collateral Lines, Their Births, Marriages and Issues: Famous Actions both in War and Peace: Religious and Charitable Donations: Deaths, Places of Burial, Monuments, Epitaphs: And many valuable Memoirs never before printed. Vol. 1. London.
