= Malcolm II (disambiguation) =

Malcolm II was King of the Scots from 1005 to 1034.

Malcolm II may also refer to:

- Máel Coluim II, Earl of Fife
- Maol Choluim II, Earl of Lennox
