= Earl of Lothian =

Earl of Lothian may refer to:

- Earl of Dunbar, a title which existed between the early 12th century and the early 15th century
- Marquess of Lothian, peerages created in 1606 and 1631
