= Cailean Mór =

Scottish nobleman

Cailean Mór Caimbeul (also known as Sir Colin Campbell; died after 1296) is one of the earliest attested members of Clan Campbell and an important ancestor figure of the later medieval Earls of Argyll.

Cailean was the son of Gilleasbaig, a knight and lord of the estates of Menstrie and Sauchie in Clackmannanshire. It was first suggested in the 1970s that Cailean's mother was Afraig, a daughter of Cailean mac Dhonnchaidh, the probable father of Niall, Earl of Carrick. Although it has also been suggested that this Afraig was the daughter of Niall himself, there is no doubt that Afraig was of the family of the Gaelic Earls of Carrick. This means that Cailean himself was the cousin of the future king, Robert I of Scotland, which explains why the Campbells were so attached to the Bruce cause during the Wars of Scottish Independence. Cailean himself took part in the Great Cause, and was one of the Bruce representative advocates to King Edward I of England in 1291.

He appears as a witness in various documents dating to the 1290s and relating to lordships in south-western Scotland. He appears in the Newbattle Registrum of around 1293, where he is called the son of "Gylascop Kambel" ("Gilleasbaig Caimbeul"), obtaining from Sir Robert Lindsay the estate of Symington; the document, which has James Stewart, 5th High Steward of Scotland, Lord of Kyle, as one of Cailean's pledgers, guarantees continued payment of rent to Newbattle Abbey. In 1295, Cailean appears as a witness in a charter of James Stewart granted to Paisley Abbey, and in 1296 appears again in the Paisley Registrum attesting the marriage of James to the sister of Richard de Burgh, Earl of Ulster. Cailean also witnessed a charter of Maol Choluim, the contemporary Mormaer or Earl of Lennox, and in another Lennox charter in which he is granted lands in Cowal by John Lamont, one of Maol Chaluim's vassals.

By 1296, and perhaps by 1293, Cailean held the position of "Ballie" of Loch Awe and Ardscotnish, a position he was granted either by King John Balliol or Edward I of England. It was this position that made him the enemy of Iain of Lorn, the MacDougall Lord of Lorne. Sometime after September 1296, Cailean was killed by the MacDougalls at the "Red Ford" on the borders of Loch Awe and Lorne at a place known as the String of Lorne. A cairn called Carn Chailein, located within 2 km of Kilbeg on Loch Avich, is traditionally said to mark the place where Cailean was killed. The age of the cairn is unknown, although it seems to have been in existence by the seventeenth century.

== Marriage and issue ==
According to the 17th century compilation Ane Accompt of the Genealogie of the Campbells, Cailean married Janet Sinclair, daughter of Sir John Sinclair of Dunglass. However, by its own admission, this document is not intended on being perfectly accurate, and there are no 13th century documents known to verify such a marriage took place. Ane Accompt states that they had the following children:

- Domhnall mac Cailein
- Neil (or Niall) Campbell, died 1315
- Gillespic (or Archibald) Campbell
- Dougall (or Dugald) Campbell

Other sources attest to an unnamed daughter who married Aonghus Mór mac Domhnaill, and A History of Clan Campbell assumes that two entries in the Ragman Rolls (Duncan Campbell of Perth and Donald Campbell of Dunbartonshire) were also sons of Cailean.
