= St Mary's Priory =

St Mary's Priory or the Priory Church of St Mary may refer to:

== England ==
- Bushmead Priory, Bedfordshire
- Parish and Priory Church of St Mary, Totnes, Devon
- St Mary's Priory Church, Deerhurst, Gloucestershire
- Lancaster Priory, Lancashire
- St Mary's Priory, Coxford, Norfolk
- Binham Priory, Norfolk
- St. Mary's Priory and Cathedral, Coventry, West Midlands
- Bridlington Priory, Yorkshire

== Ireland ==
- St. Mary's Dominican Priory, Tallaght, Parish Church, Retreat Centre and educational institution - The Priory Institute

== Wales ==
- Priory Church of St Mary, Abergavenny, Monmouthshire
- Priory and Parish Church of St Mary, Chepstow, Monmouthshire
- St Mary's Priory Church, Monmouth, Monmouthshire
- The Priory and Parish Church of Saint Mary (Beddgelert)

== Scotland ==
- St Mary's Priory, Isle of Trahil, in Galloway, Scotland
- St Mary's Priory, North Berwick, in East Lothian, Scotland

== See also ==
- St Mary's Church (disambiguation)
