= North Berwick Priory =

Priory in East Lothian, Scotland

Coordinates: 56.04859°N 2.71597°W

Priory of St Mary of North Berwick
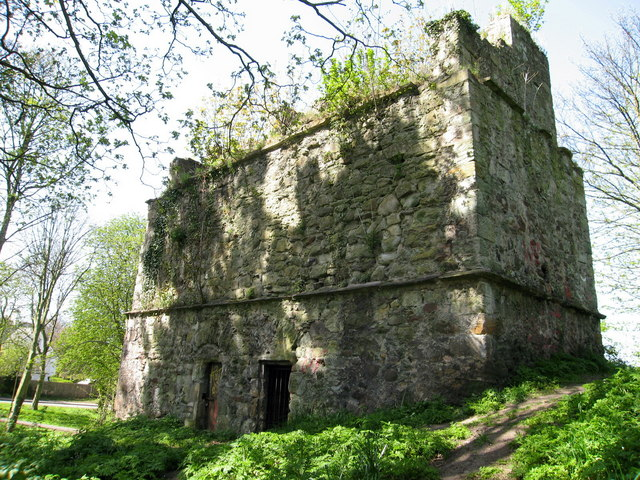
- Doocot in the grounds of the ruined abbey
- Interactive map of Priory of St Mary of North Berwick

Monastery information
- Other names: North Berwick priory, North Berwick nunnery
- Order: Benedictine (and possibly later Cistercian)
- Established: c. 1150
- Disestablished: 1588 (last nominal prioress died 1596x1597)
- Dedication: St Mary
- Diocese: St Andrews
- Controlled churches: Kilconquhar, Kirkbride (St Brigit's, Maybole), Largo, Largs, Logie-Atheron, Maybole (St Cuthbert's), North Berwick

People
- Founder: Donnchad I, Earl of Fife

Site
- Location: North Berwick, East Lothian

North Berwick Priory, North Berwick nunnery or the Priory of St Mary, North Berwick, was a monastery of nuns in medieval East Lothian, Scotland. Founded by Donnchad I, Earl of Fife (owner of much of northern East Lothian) around 1150, the priory lasted for more than four centuries, declining and disappearing after the Scottish Reformation. It had been endowed by the Earls of Carrick as well as the Earls of Fife, but over time lost its dependence on these and came to be controlled by the more locally based Home (or Hume) family, who eventually acquired the priory's lands as a free barony.

== History ==
Although later medieval sources, such as the Scotichronicon of Walter Bower, allege that the founder of the house was Máel Coluim I, Earl of Fife (died ca. 1228), it is clear from Charter evidence that it was founded by his grandfather, Earl Donnchad I (died 1154). A Charter of Donnchad I's son and successor Earl Donnchad II mentions that Donnchad I had granted land to the priory. Máel Coluim I however confirmed all of North Berwick's possessions in a Charter of 1199. The date of the house's foundation is unclear. A date between 1147 and 1153 is probable, perhaps 1150.

The Fife family's kinsman, Donnchad, Earl of Carrick, also patronised the house. He gave that house the Rectorship of the Church of St Cuthbert of Maybole sometime between 1189 and 1250, but probably soon after he was created an earl, in 1225. Donnchad of Carrick also confirmed the donation by Sir Roger de Skelbrooke of the Church of St Brigit at Kirkbride to the nuns, as well as a grant of 3 marks from a place called Barrebeth.

North Berwick appears to have been a Cistercian house, but the relationship between the Cistercian Order and communities of nuns was complicated, and it may originally have been founded as a simple Benedictine house. Gervase of Canterbury c. 1207 described it as such in a list of religious houses. Such switching to the Cistercians occurred often in England, whose nuns found the privileges of that Order attractive.

A papal bull of Pope Clement VII, dated 18 February 1384, said that the monastery (described as not using the Cistercian habit) had been the victim of war and had its church burned down. Monasteries of Cistercian women usually had thirteen nuns: the prioress and twelve sisters, but North Berwick had 21 sisters and a prioress in 1544, and still had a similar number on the eve of the Scottish Reformation. The hospitals of Ardross and North Berwick had been dependent on the priory.

In 1565 the priory lands were leased to Alexander Home of North Berwick by his sister, the last prioress, Margaret Home. On 20 March 1588 King James VI turned these lands into a free barony for Home. The buildings of the priory were said to be ruinous in 1587.

== List of known prioresses ==
- Beatrice, fl. 1375
- Ellen of Carrick, fl. 1379–x1401
- Matilda of Leys, fl. 1401–1434
- Mariot Ramsay, fl. 1463
- Elspeth Forman, el. 1473
- Alison Home, 1473–1525
- Isabel Home, 1525–1544
- Margaret Home, 1543–1562
- Mariot Cockburn, 1566–1568
- Margaret Home (again), 1568–1596x1597
