= Patrick IV, Earl of March =

13th-century Anglo-Scottish earl and claimant to the throne

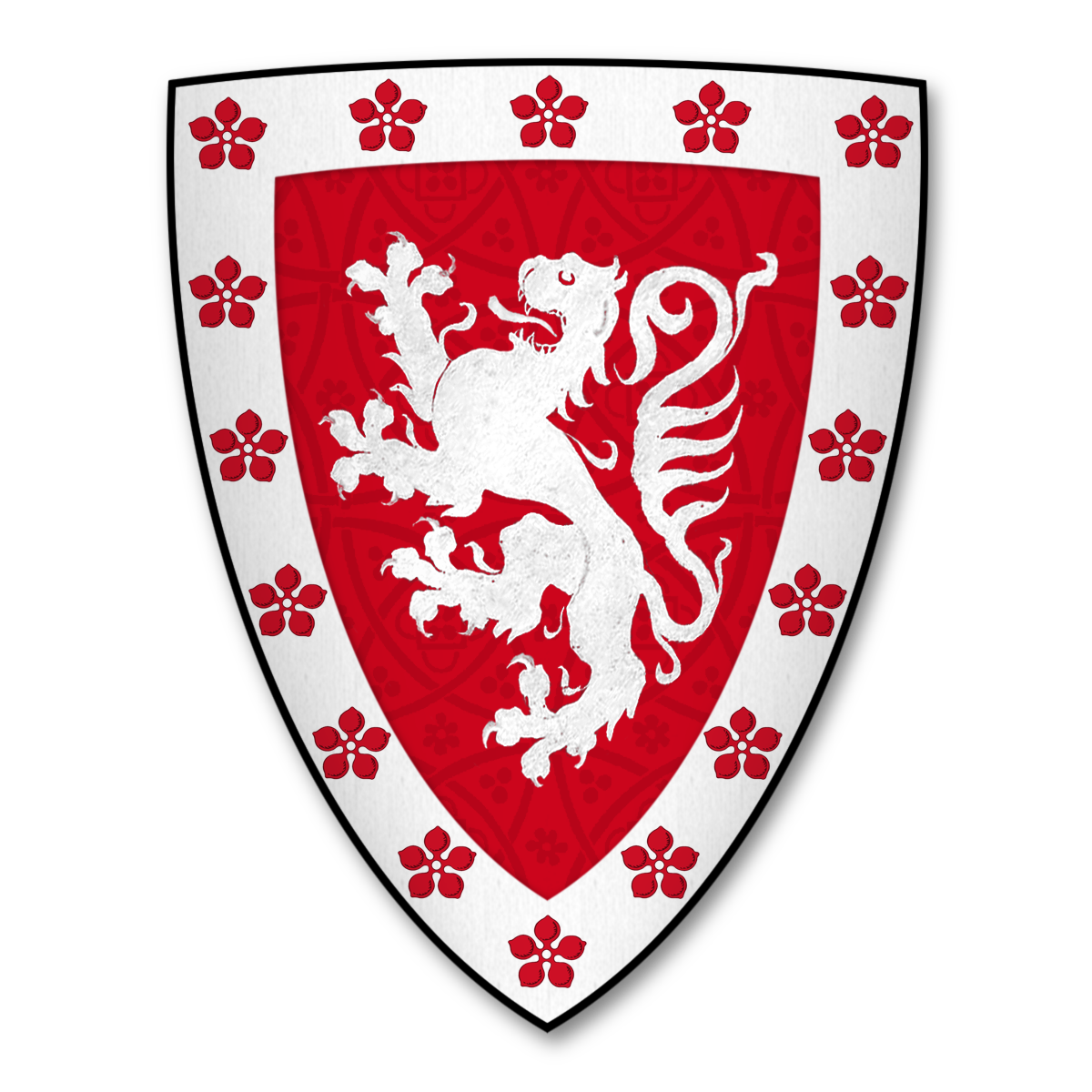
The coat of arms of Patrick IV, Earl of March, as blazoned in the Caerlaverock Poem

Patrick IV, 8th Earl of Dunbar and 1st Earl of March (1242 – 10 October 1308 or 1309), sometimes called Patric[k] of Dunbar or Patric de Dunbar, and nicknamed "Black-beard", was the most important magnate in the Borders region of Scotland. He was one of the Competitors for the Crown of Scotland.

While he appears to have been the first to use the title earl of March, this has latterly been treated as essentially synonymous with earl of Dunbar (sometimes also earl of Lothian before 1606), such that he may sometimes be referred to as "Patrick, 8th Earl of March", applying the Dunbar numbering to the March name (and similarly with his descendants).

== Succession ==
Said to be aged 46 or 47 at his father's death, Sir Patrick de Dunbar, Knight, Earl of Dunbar, had livery of his father's lands on 14 May 1290. It appears that this earl of Dunbar assumed the additional title earl of March, as he appeared designated comes de Marchia at the parliament at Birgham in 1289 or 1290, for the purpose of betrothing the Princess Margaret to the son of King Edward I of England. (This failed to come about due to her death on the way to Scotland.)

== Ambition and submission ==
The Earl of Dunbar was one of the "seven earls of Scotland", a distinct body separate from the other estates of the realm, who claimed the right to elect a king in cases of disputed succession. Patrick became one of the Competitors for the Crown of Scotland on 3 August 1291, when he entered a formal claim in right of his great-grandmother, Ada, Countess of Dunbar, an illegitimate daughter of William the Lion, King of Scots. He quickly dropped his claim in favor of that of Robert the Bruce (Patrick's grandfather and at that time the earl of Carrick). The machinations of Edward I of England led to John Balliol's selection as the new king of Scotland.

== Fealty ==
Despite at least nominally supporting Robert Bruce, Patrick had already sworn fealty to King Edward I of England on 13 June 1291. Like so many Scottish noblemen, including the Bruces, Dunbar held lands also in England which required knights' services, and he was summoned by Edward I in 1294 to assist him at war in Gascony.

The Earl of Dunbar and March, with the Earl of Angus, Robert Bruce the elder, and his son the Robert, Earl of Carrick, swore fealty to the English king again at Wark on 25 March 1296. In this turbulent year of rewewed warfare between Scotland and England, Patrick aligned with England. He appears to have been betrayed by his wife, who took the Scottish side and retained the castle of Dunbar for John Balliol but was obliged to surrender it to Edward I on 29 April 1296.

In 1297, it appears that the Earl ceased, for a time, his allegiance to Edward I, held his lands from the Scottish crown, and was favourably received by Sir William Wallace, with whom he had been in bitter battle the previous year.

He was certainly in Edward I's favour by 1298, serving as captain of the Berwick garrison, and in November was made King's Lieutenant for Scotland, commanding English forces south of the River Forth as far west as Ayrshire, He was present in 1300 at the siege of Caerlaverock Castle, with his son and heir, Patrick V. He was elected a Scottish commissioner to the English Parliament in 1304 or 1306, but was replaced by Sir John Menteith after refusing to attend.

By 1307, Patrick was helping keep the peace on the English side of the Anglo-Scottish border, active in Cumberland, Lancashire, and Westmorland. Upon the accession of Edward II in July of that year, Patrick continued to adhere to the English interest, until his death.

== Marriage and children ==
Sources disagree on Patrick IV's marriage(s) and offspring, with agreement only on a son, Patrick V, 9th Earl.

The 8th Earl is most often believed to have married, before 1282, Marjory (or Marjorie) Comyn, daughter of Alexander Comyn, Earl of Buchan by his spouse Elizabeth, in turn daughter of Roger de Quincy, 2nd Earl of Winchester by Ellen of Galloway. From this marriage is believed to have issued the child Patrick V. The evidence in support of this marriage is actually scant, being only a letter of 1400 (with at least one genealogical error in it) from George, 10th Earl of Dunbar, to Henry IV of England purporting to lay out their genealogical relation. This, with partial corroboration in Andrew of Wyntoun's Orygynale Cronykil of Scotland, (c. 1420–1424) that an unnamed daughter of Alexander Comyn married a Patrick of Dunbar, was evidence enough for acceptance into the John Philip Wood-revised version of Sir Robert Douglas's Peerage of Scotland (latterly Baronage of Scotland) in 1798 (further revised 1813).

An alternative or additional hypothesis is that Patrick IV at some point married Marian, daughter of Duncan III, 10th Earl of Fife, by whom he supposedly had two sons, Patrick V and George. The idea was introduced in the original 1764 edition of Douglas's Peerage of Scotland, without any evidence. As Paul (1906) put it, the claim "has not been substantiated", and Douglas's posthumous editor Wood removed it from the later edition, replacing it with the Comyn claim and a single child. The additional claims have nevertheless been picked up sometimes by later writers.

Claimed children include:

- Patrick V, 9th Earl of Dunbar (1285–1369) In particular, Miller (1859) claims that Patrick V was the only son of Patrick IV and Marjory, and Dunbar (1906) lists only this child, as does the Wood-revised Douglas (1798, 1813).
- George de Dunbar, purported ancestor of the Dunbars of Cumnock and Mochrum
- John de Dunbar of Derchester and Birkynside (in Lauderdale)
- Cecilia, born c. 1291 (not to be mistaken for Cecily, her aunt, who married James Stewart, High Steward of Scotland)

Preceded by Patrick III	Earl of Dunbar; 1289/1290–1308	Succeeded by Patrick V
Preceded by –	Earl of March; 1290–1308	Succeeded by Patrick V
