= Waltheof, Earl of Dunbar =

Waltheof (died 1182), earl of Lothian or Dunbar and lord of Beanley, was a 12th-century Anglo-Scottish noble. He was the eldest son of Gospatric III, Earl of Lothian by his Scottish wife, Deirdre.

Waltheof's grandfather, Gospatric II, died at the Battle of the Standard in 1138, and Waltheof's father Gospatric III became earl. Richard of Hexham reported that, in 1139, the son of Earl Gospatric served as a hostage to King Stephen of England after the following peace agreement. It is generally believed, although there can be no proof, that this son was the young Waltheof. Exactly how long Waltheof would have stayed as a hostage is not known, but Waltheof's father Gospatric died in 1166 and Waltheof was apparently earl already in 1165. This was probably because Gospatric had retired to Durham as a monk some time before his actual death.

Waltheof's activities as earl included trying to persuade King William of Scotland not to invade England, which William did anyway in 1174; and arbitrating a dispute between the Abbot of Melrose and Richard de Morville. Waltheof married a woman named Alina, possibly Scottish, and by her fathered three children, Patrick (his successor), Causantín (Constantine) and Helen.

He died in 1182, and is styled "Earl of Dunbar" by the Chronicle of Melrose. He was the first man to be called "earl of Dunbar" rather than "earl of Lothian".

== Sources ==
- McDonald, Andrew, ‘Waltheof, third earl of Lothian (d. 1182)’, Oxford Dictionary of National Biography, Oxford University Press, 2004 accessed 28 November 2006

Preceded by Gospatric III	Earl of Lothian (Dunbar) x1165/1166 – 1182	Succeeded by Patrick I
