= Gille Críst, Earl of Menteith =

Scottish noble

Gille Críst is the first known Mormaer (in Scotland, a regional or provincial ruler, equivalent to Latin comes, French comte and English earl) of Menteith, but almost certainly not actually the first. He is named in a charter of King Máel Coluim IV, dated to 1164, regarding the restoration of Scone Priory, which had recently been destroyed by fire. He appears again in a charter of King William the Lion, dated 1175x1178, as one of the witnesses to a grant of privileges to the newly established burgh of Glasgow.

Gille Críst had two known sons, Muireadhach Mór and Muireadhach Óg. He also had a daughter, Éua, who married Ailín II, Earl of Lennox.

Gille Críst had died by 1189/1198, when Muireadhach Mór appears as Mormaer for the first time.

== Bibliography ==
- Paul, James Balfour, The Scots Peerage, Vol. VI, (Edinburgh, 1909)
- Roberts, John L., Lost Kingdoms: Celtic Scotland in the Middle Ages, (Edinburgh, 1997), pp. 52

| Preceded by ? | Mormaer of Menteith fl. 1164x1198 | Succeeded by Muireadhach |
