= Gilleasbaig of Menstrie =

Earliest Campbell attested in contemporary sources

Gille Escoib or Gilleasbaig of Menstrie is the earliest member of the Campbell family to be attested in contemporary sources, appearing in royal charters dating to the 1260s. His existence is confirmed by later Campbell pedigrees. According to these genealogies, he was the son of a man named Dubhghall ("Dugald"). However, nothing is known of this man, nor of the 4 or 5 generations of his ancestors who constitute the probable historical section these genealogies preceding Dubhghall. Gilleasbaig's first historical appearance dates to 1263, when he appeared in a charter of King Alexander III of Scotland, being named as "Gilascoppe Cambell". He was granted the estates of Menstrie and Sauchie in Clackmannanshire (but then under the supervision of the sheriff of Stirling). His next appearance, and indeed his final appearance, is in 1266, when he witnessed another royal charter at Stirling granting favours to Lindores Abbey. The genealogies, and indeed later 13th century patronymic appellations, tell us that Gilleasbaig was the father of Cailean Mór, probably by marriage to the Carrick noblewoman, Afraig, a daughter of Cailean of Carrick.

The name Gilleasbaig is a modernization of "Gilla Escoib" (with a variety of related spellings, such as Gille Escoib), and is often rendered as "Archibald" in English or occasionally "Gillespie" or "Gillespic".
