= Patrick III, Earl of Dunbar =

13th-century Anglo-Gaelic noble

Patrick III, 7th Earl of Dunbar (c. 1213 – 24 August 1289) was lord of the feudal barony of Dunbar and its castle, which dominated East Lothian, and the most important military personage in the Scottish Borders.

== Background ==
Said to be aged 35 in 1248, he was the son of Patrick II, Earl of Dunbar (by Eupheme de Brus), who was son of Patrick I, Earl of Dunbar, who was son of Waltheof, Earl of Dunbar, who was descendant in male line of Gospatric, Earl of Northumbria. His successors controlled the marches, but the title Earl of March was only assumed by Patrick IV, Earl of March.

== Career ==
Patrick did homage for his lands in England to King Henry III in 1249. The earl was part of the English faction who opposed the Comyns and in 1255 he and others procured the dismissal of the Comyns and their faction from power. The same year he was nominated Regent and Guardian of the King and Queen. In 1258 the Comyn's faction prevailed, and Earl Patrick was excluded from the government.

In 1263 he founded a monastery for the Carmelites or White Friars in Dunbar; and led the left division of the Scottish army at the battle of Largs the same year. In 1266 when Magnus V of Norway ceded the Isle of Man and the Hebrides to King Alexander III of Scotland, the Earl of Dunbar's seal appears on the Treaty of Perth, signed in Norway in 1266.

Patrick, Earl of Dunbar, was second in the list of thirteen earls who signed the marriage contract of Princess Margaret of Scotland and King Eric of Norway in 1281. In 1284 he attended the parliament at Scone which declared the Princess Margaret of Norway to be heiress to the Scottish Crown.

He died at Whittingehame, and was buried at Dunbar, East Lothian.

== Marriage ==
He married firstly, before 1240, Cecily, daughter of John FitzRobert, Lord of Warkworth, Northumberland (died 1240),

He married secondly Christiana, daughter of Robert de Brus, 5th Lord of Annandale, the "Competitor" (1210–1295), and had five known children:

- Patrick IV, Earl of March, a "Competitor" (1242–1308), son and heir.
- Sir John de Dunbar, Knt.
- Sir Alexander de Dunbar, Knt.
- Agnes de Dunbar, who married Christell de Seton, 'in Jedburgh Forrest' (died c. 1300)
- Cecily (or Cecilia) de Dunbar, who married Sir James Stewart, 5th High Steward of Scotland.

Although some sources show Christiana de Brus as Patrick's wife and the mother of his children, other sources are in disagreement with this. According to The Scots Peerage, 'Cecilia filia Johannis' was his only recorded wife and mother of his sons, based on a charter by her eldest son. The Complete Peerage shows 'Cecil, da. of John' as his wife and states that Christian Bruce was erroneously assigned as his wife in Wood's Douglas.

Preceded by Patrick II	Earl of Dunbar; 1248–1289	Succeeded by Patrick IV
