= Cailean of Carrick =

Scottish heir

Cailean of Carrick or Cailean mac Donnchadh ("Colin, son of Duncan", died before 1250) was the son of Donnchadh, Earl of Carrick († 1250) and Avelina (FitzAlan) Stewart, and probably the father of Niall, Earl of Carrick († 1256). Although once heir to the earldom of Carrick, Cailean appears to have died before 1250, the year of his father's death.

== Family ==
The traditional view, going back to the 19th century, is that Donnchadh's son and heir was Niall. This view has been criticised by genealogist Andrew MacEwen, who has argued that Niall was not the son of Donnchadh, but rather his grandson, a view embraced by leading Scottish medievalist Professor G. W. S. Barrow. According to this argument, Donnchadh's son and intended heir was Cailean (alias Nicholaus of Carrick), who as his son and heir, issued a charter in Donnchadh's lifetime, but seemingly predeceased him.

It was further suggested that Cailean's wife, Earl Niall's mother, was a daughter of the Tír Eoghain king in 1230 Niall Ruadh mac Aodha O'Neill (d. 1235) and Nuala O'Connor, tying in with Donnchadh's Irish activities, accounting for the use of the name Niall, and explaining the strong alliance with the O'Neill held by Niall's grandsons.

Cailean appears to have had a daughter, Afraig, who married Gilleasbaig of Menstrie, a Clackmannanshire baron who was the first attested man to bear the surname "Campbell". With this lady, Gilleasbaig fathered Cailean Mór, the ancestor of the later Earls of Argyll.
