= Gospatric II, Earl of Lothian =

12th-century Anglo-Scottish earl

Gospatric II (died 1138) was Earl of Lothian or Earl of Dunbar in the early 12th century.

He was the son of Gospatric I, sometime Earl of Northumbria (d. after 1073). In the earliest sources, occurring at dates between 1120 and 1134 he is not styled "earl", but the "brother of Dolfin", the latter style being used in his own seal.

Later accounts say that he was granted lands by king Máel Coluim III, although it is possible that he received them from his father, while his brother Dolfin received much of Cumberland. As Gospatric held lands from both King David I of Scotland and King Henry I of England it is impossible to label him either "English" or "Scottish". He witnessed the charter of Alexander I of Scotland founding Scone Abbey.

Gospatric enjoyed the benefits of the renewed prominence given to native Englishmen in the reign of Henry I. He and his children obtained many lands in England proper, and he himself gained jurisdiction over some northern English legal duties. He appears to have attained the status of "earl" by the year 1134, when that style first appears in documentary sources.

Earl Gospatric, described as "the chief leader of the men of Lothian" was killed at the Battle of the Standard, being "struck by an arrow, he fell".

He had four sons, Gospatric III (his successor), Adam, Edward, and Edgar. His daughter, Juliana, married Ralph de Merlay. Ralph and Juliana founded Newminster Abbey.

Preceded by -	Earl of Lothian x1134–1138	Succeeded by Gospatrick III
