= Patrick II, Earl of Dunbar =

13th-century Anglo-Gaelic noble

Patrick II (1185–1249), called "6th Earl of Dunbar", was a 13th-century Anglo-Scottish noble, and one of the leading figures during the reign of King Alexander II of Scotland.

Said to be aged forty-six at the time of his father's death, this Patrick was the eldest son of Patrick I, Earl of Dunbar and Ada, daughter of King William I of Scotland. He probably succeeded to his father's lands some time before the latter's death on 31 December 1232, as his father was elderly and had been ill for some time.

He renounced his claim to some disputed Marches in lower Lauderdale to the monks of Melrose, and in 1235 he, with Adam, Abbot of Melrose, and Gilbert, Bishop of Galloway, led an expedition against the Galloway revolt of 1234–1235. He accompanied King Alexander II of Scotland to York and was a witness and guarantor to the treaty with King Henry III of England, in 1237.

Shortly after 1242 the Earl of Dunbar was sent to subdue the rebellious Thane of Argyll. The Earl held first rank among the twenty-four barons who guaranteed the Treaty of Peace with England in 1244.

Holinshed relates, he accompanied Lindsay of Glenesk and Stewart of Dundonald to crusade, where he died in 1249 at the siege of Damietta in Egypt.

Before 1213, he married Euphemia (d. 1267 at Whittingehame), whom historians had previously believed to be daughter of Walter FitzAlan, 3rd High Steward of Scotland and lord of Kyle, Strathgryfe and Bute.

Euphemia's father was, however, certainly not Walter FitzAlan.

Issue by Euphemia:

- Patrick, 7th Earl of Dunbar.
- Waldeve (Waltheof), Rector of Dunbar, named as son of Earl Patrick by Pope Innocent IV in an indult to him dated 3 February 1245, at Lyons.
- Isabel, married Roger FitzJohn

== Notes ==
Preceded by Patrick I	Earl of Dunbar (Lothian); 1232–1248	Succeeded by Patrick III
