= Gospatric III, Earl of Lothian =

12th-century Anglo-Celtic noble

Gospatric III or Cospatric III (died 1166) was a twelfth-century Anglo-Celtic noble, who was Earl of Lothian and later the Earl of Dunbar, and feudal Lord of Beanley.

He was the son of Gospatric II, Earl of Lothian (later called Earl of Dunbar). He appeared for the first time as a witness in a charter representing his father's grant to Coldingham Priory. After his father's death in 1138, he inherited his father's territories in Northumberland, East Lothian and the Scottish Borders. He bore the title "Earl of Lothian" on his seal. The following year "the son of Earl Gospatric and the son of Hugh de Morville and the son of earl Fergus (of Galloway)" were asked to go as hostages in negotiations with King Stephen of England.

He married a Scottish woman called Deirdre, and by her fathered three sons, Waltheof, Earl of Lothian, Uchtred deDundas and Sir Patrick de Greenlaw (patrilineal ancestor of the Earls of Home). Gospatric was a great religious patron, granting lands to many of his neighbouring abbeys. He even appears to have become a monk himself, and when he died there in 1166 he was probably already part of the monastic community where he was buried, at Durham.

- McDonald, R. Andrew "Gospatric, second earl of Lothian (d. 1166)", Oxford Dictionary of National Biography, Oxford University Press, 2004 accessed 22 Nov 2006

Preceded by Gospatric	Earl of Lothian; 1138/9–1166	Succeeded by Waltheof
