= Muireadhach II, Earl of Menteith =

Scottish noble

Muireadach II of Menteith (also written as Murethach, Murdoch or Maurice), ruled 1213–1231, was the son of Gille Críst and the third known Mormaer of Menteith. Muireadach gained the Mormaerdom by challenging the rights of the current Mormaer, his elder brother, also called Muireadhach, hence Muireadhch Mór (in English, "the elder"). The case apparently went to arbitration, and the king decided on the right of Muireadhch Óg. On 13 December 1213, Muireadhach Mór resigned the Mormaerdom, taking lesser lands and titles in compensation.

Muireadhach Óg was one of the seven mormaers present at the coronation of King Alexander II of Scotland in 1214, and Muireadhach accompanied the king in the funeral cortège of his father and predecessor, King William of Scotland. Muireadhach Óg appears again in the company of the king in 1224, when he appears on a charter issued at Stirling granting rights to Paisley Abbey. In a document dating to 1226, Muireadach is referred to as "Sheriff of Stirling". He had no legitimate sons, but two daughters, Isabella (Iosbail), who married a Comyn, and Maria (Màire), who married a Stewart; both became countesses in their own right.

Muireadach died before January 1234, when his successor appears with the comital title for the first time.

== Bibliography ==
- Paul, James Balfour, The Scots Peerage, Vol. VI, (Edinburgh, 1909)
- Roberts, John L., Lost Kingdoms: Celtic Scotland in the Middle Ages, (Edinburgh, 1997), pp. 52

Preceded by Muireadhach I	Mormaer of Menteith; 1213-x1234	Succeeded by Isabella
