= Muireadhach I, Earl of Menteith =

Scottish nobleman

Muireadhach I (also written as Murethach, Murdoch or Maurice) is the second known Mormaer of Menteith. He succeeded his father Gille Críst by the time of his appearance in a charter of William the Lion confirming the church at Moulin to Dunfermline Abbey. The charter is undated, but must have been written between 1189 and 1198. He appears again in a charter agreement between Gilbert, Prior of St Andrews, and the local Céli Dé dating sometime after 1198.

Muireadhach Mór's right to the Mormaerdom was challenged at some stage by his younger brother, also called Muireadhach, hence Muireadhach Óg (in English, "the younger"). The case apparently went to arbitration, and the king decided on the right of Muireadhch Óg. On 13 December 1213, Muireadhach Mór resigned the Mormaerdom, taking lesser lands and titles in compensation. It is not known for how long Muireadhach Mór lived, nor is it known if he had any wives or offspring.

== Bibliography ==
- Paul, James Balfour, The Scots Peerage, Vol. VI, (Edinburgh, 1909)
- Roberts, John L., Lost Kingdoms: Celtic Scotland in the Middle Ages, (Edinburgh, 1997), pp. 52

Preceded by Gille Críst	Mormaer of Menteith fl. 1189x1213	Succeeded by Muireadhach II
