= Donnchadh, Earl of Carrick =

Scottish noble, Mormaer or Earl of Carrick (died 1250)

Donnchadh (Duncan)
- Mormaer or Earl of Carrick
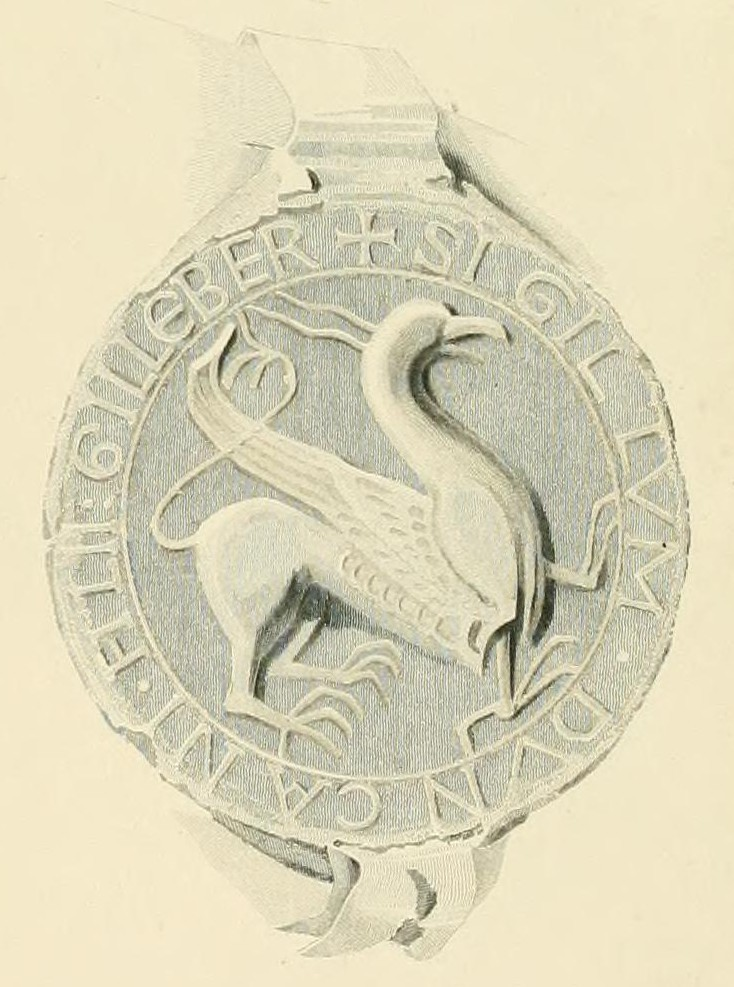
- A 19th-century reproduction of an impression of Donnchadh's seal, surviving from a Melrose charter, depicting [according to antiquarian Henry Laing] a "winged dragon"; the inscription reads SIGILLUM DUNCANI FILII GILLEBER.. ("The seal of Donnchadh son of Gille-Brighde")
- Reign: c. 1186–1250
- Predecessor: Gille-Brighde mac Fergusa
- Successor: Niall mac Donnchaidh
- Born: mid-to-late 12th century location unknown, probably Galloway or Carrick
- Died: 13 June 1250
- Spouse: Avelina (FitzAlan) Stewart, daughter of Alan fitz Walter
- Modern Gaelic: Donnchadh mac Ghille-Brìghde
- Latin: Don[n]ecanus or Dun[e]canus filius Gilleberti
- Norman French: Dunecan fitz Gilbert
- Father: Gille-Brighde of Galloway
- Mother: uncertain, but perhaps a daughter or sister of Donnchadh II, Earl of Fife

Donnchadh (Scottish Gaelic pronunciation: [ˈt̪ɔn̪ˠɔxəɣ]; Latin: Duncanus; English: Duncan) was a Gall-Gaidhil prince and Scottish magnate in what is now south-western Scotland, whose career stretched from the last quarter of the 12th century until his death in 1250. His father, Gille-Brighde of Galloway, and his uncle, Uhtred of Galloway, were the two rival sons of Fergus, Prince or Lord of Galloway. As a result of Gille-Brighde's conflict with Uhtred and the Scottish monarch William the Lion, Donnchadh became a hostage of King Henry II of England. He probably remained in England for almost a decade before returning north on the death of his father. Although denied succession to all the lands of Galloway, he was granted lordship over Carrick in the north.

Allied to John de Courcy, Donnchadh fought battles in Ireland and acquired land there that he subsequently lost. A patron of religious houses, particularly Melrose Abbey and North Berwick priory nunnery, he attempted to establish a monastery in his own territory, at Crossraguel. He married the daughter of Alan fitz Walter, a leading member of the family later known as the House of Stewart—future monarchs of Scotland and England. Donnchadh was the first mormaer or earl of Carrick, a region he ruled for more than six decades, making him one of the longest serving magnates in medieval Scotland. His descendants include the Bruce and Stewart Kings of Scotland, and probably the Campbell Dukes of Argyll.

== Sources ==
Donnchadh's career is not well documented in the surviving sources. Charters provide a little information about some of his activities, but overall their usefulness is limited; this is because no charter-collections (called cartularies) from the Gaelic south-west have survived the Middle Ages, and the only surviving charters relevant to Donnchadh's career come from the heavily Normanised English-speaking area to the east. Principally, the relevant charters record his acts of patronage towards religious houses, but incidental details mentioned in the body of these texts and the witness lists subscribed to them are useful for other matters.

Some English government records describe his activities in relation to Ireland, and occasional chronicle entries from England and the English-speaking regions of what became south-eastern Scotland record other important details. Aside from the Chronicle of Melrose, the most significant of these sources are the works of Roger of Hoveden, and the material preserved in the writings of John of Fordun and Walter Bower.

Roger of Hoveden wrote two important works: the Gesta Henrici II ("Deeds of Henry II", alternatively titled Gesta Henrici et Ricardi, "Deeds of Henry and Richard") and the Chronica, the latter a re-worked and supplemented version of the former. These works are the most important and valuable sources for Scottish history in the late 12th century. The Gesta Henrici II covers the period from 1169 to April 1192, and the Chronica covers events until 1201. Roger of Hoveden is particularly important in relation to what is now south-western Scotland, the land of the Gall-Gaidhil. He served as an emissary in the region in 1174 on behalf of the English monarch, and thus his account of, for example, the approach of Donnchadh's father Gille-Brighde towards the English king comes from a witness. Historians rely on Roger's writings for a number of important details about Donnchadh's life: that Gille-Brighde handed Donnchadh over as a hostage to Henry II under the care of Hugh de Morwic, Sheriff of Cumberland; that Donnchcadh married the daughter of Alan fitz Walter under protest from the Scottish king; and that Donnchadh fought a battle in Ireland in 1197 assisting John de Courcy, Prince of Ulster.

Another important chronicle source is the material preserved in John of Fordun's Chronica gentis Scottorum ("Chronicle of the Scottish people") and Walter Bower's Scotichronicon. John of Fordun's work, which survives on its own, was incorporated in the following century into the work of Bower. Fordun's Chronica was written and compiled between 1384 and August 1387. Despite the apparently late date, Scottish textual historian Dauvit Broun has shown that Fordun's work in fact consists of two earlier pieces, Gesta Annalia I and Gesta Annalia II, the former written before April 1285 and covering the period from King Máel Coluim mac Donnchada (Malcolm III, died 1093) to 2 February 1285. Gesta Annalia I appears to have been based on an even earlier text, about the descendants of Saint Margaret of Scotland, produced at Dunfermline Abbey. Thus material from these works concerning the late 12th- and early 13th-century Gall-Gaidhil may represent, despite the apparent late date, reliable contemporary or near-contemporary accounts.

== Geographic and cultural background ==
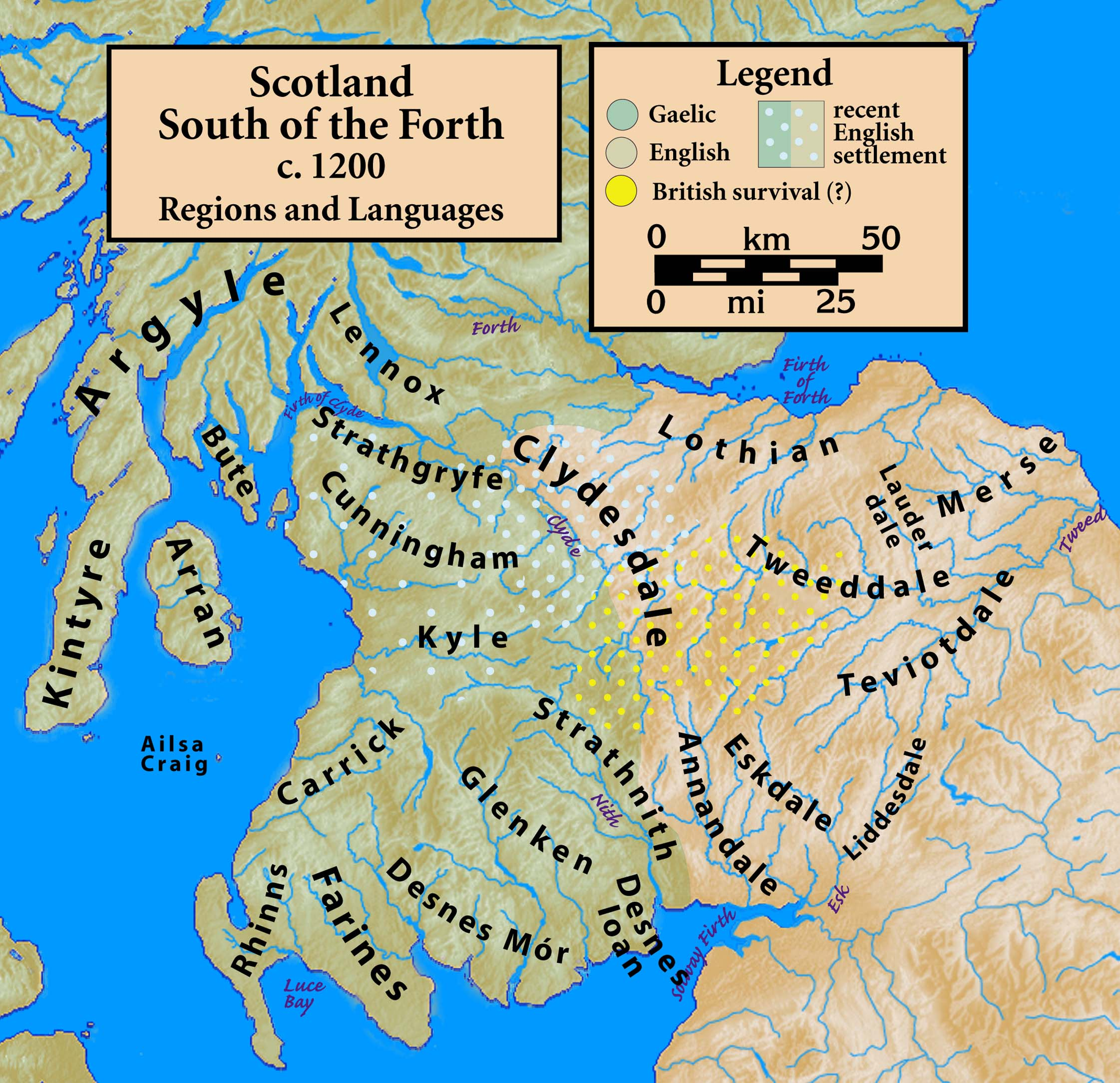
Linguistic regions and provinces of what is now southern Scotland

Donnchadh's territory lay in what is now Scotland south of the River Forth, a multi-ethnic region during the late 12th century. North of the Forth was the Gaelic kingdom of Scotland (Alba), which under its partially Normanised kings exercised direct or indirect control over most of the region to the south as far as the borders of Northumberland and Cumberland. Lothian and the Merse were the heartlands of the northern part of the old English Earldom of Northumbria, and in the late 12th century the people of these regions, as well as the people of Lauderdale, Eskdale, Liddesdale, and most of Teviotdale and Annandale, were English in language and regarded themselves as English by ethnicity, despite having been under the control of the king of the Scots for at least a century.

Clydesdale (or Strathclyde) was the heartland of the old Kingdom of Strathclyde; by Donnchadh's day the Scots had settled many English and Continental Europeans (principally Flemings) in the region, and administered it through the sheriffdom of Lanark. Gaelic too had penetrated much of the old Northumbrian and Strathclyde territory, coming from the west, south-west and the north, a situation that led historian Alex Woolf to compare the region to the Balkans. The British language of the area, as a result of such developments, was probably either dead or almost dead, perhaps surviving only in the uplands of Clydesdale, Tweeddale and Annandale.

The rest of the region was settled by the people called Gall-Gaidhil (modern Scottish Gaelic: Gall-Ghàidheil) in their own language, variations of Gallwedienses in Latin, and normally Galwegians or Gallovidians in modern English. References in the 11th century to the kingdom of the Gall-Gaidhil centre it far to the north of what is now Galloway. Kingarth (Cenn Garadh) and Eigg (Eic) were described as "in Galloway" (Gallgaidelaib) by the Martyrology of Óengus, in contrast to Whithorn —part of modern Galloway—which was named as lying within another kingdom, The Rhinns (Na Renna). These areas had been part of the Kingdom of Northumbria until the 9th century, and afterward were transformed by a process very poorly documented, but probably carried out by numerous small bands of culturally Scandinavian but linguistically Gaelic warrior-settlers moving in from Ireland and southern Argyll. "Galloway" today only refers to the lands of Rhinns, Farines, Glenken, Desnes Mór and Desnes Ioan (that is, Wigtownshire and the Stewartry of Kirkcudbright), but this is due to the territorial changes that took place in and around Donnchadh's lifetime rather than being the contemporary definition. For instance, a 12th-century piece of marginalia located the island of Ailsa Craig "lying between Gallgaedelu [Galloway] and Cend Tiri [Kintyre]", while a charter of Máel Coluim IV ("Malcolm IV") describes Strathgryfe, Cunningham, Kyle and Carrick as the four cadrez (probably from ceathramh, "quarter"s) of Galloway; an Irish annal entry for the year 1154 designated galleys from Arran, Kintyre, the Isle of Man as Gallghaoidhel, "Galwegian".

By the middle of the 12th century, the former territory of the kingdom of the Rhinns had become part of the Galloway kingdom, but the area to the north remained separate. Strathgryfe, Kyle and Cunningham had come under the control of the Scottish king in the early 12th century, much of it given over to soldiers of French or Anglo-French origin. Strathgryfe and most of Kyle had been given to Walter fitz Alan under King David I, with Hugh de Morville taking Cunningham. Strathnith still had a Gaelic ruler (ancestor of the famous Thomas Randolph, 1st Earl of Moray), but he was not part of the kingdom of Galloway. The rest of the region—the Rhinns, Farines, Carrick, Desnes Mór and Desnes Ioan, and the sparsely settled uplands of Glenken—was probably under the control of the sons of Fergus, King of Galloway, in the years before Donnchadh's career in the region.

== Origins and family ==
Family of Donnchadh

Donnchadh was the son of Gille-Brighde, son of Fergus, king of the Gall-Gaidhil. Donnchadh's ancestry cannot be traced further; no patronymic is known for Fergus from contemporary sources, and when Fergus' successors enumerate their ancestors in documents, they never go earlier than he does. The name Gille-Brighde, used by Donnchadh's father (Fergus' son), was also the name of the father of Somhairle, petty king of Argyll in the third quarter of the 12th century. As the original territory of the Gall-Gaidhil kingdom probably adjoined or included Argyll, Alex Woolf has suggested that Fergus and Somhairle were brothers or cousins.

There is a "body of circumstantial evidence" that suggests Donnchadh's mother was a daughter or sister of Donnchadh II, Earl of Fife. This includes Donnchadh's association with the Cistercian nunnery of North Berwick, founded by Donnchadh II of Fife's father, Donnchadh I of Fife; close ties seem to have existed between the two families, while Donnchadh's own name is further evidence. The historian who suggested this in 2000, Richard Oram, came to regard this conjecture as certain by 2004.

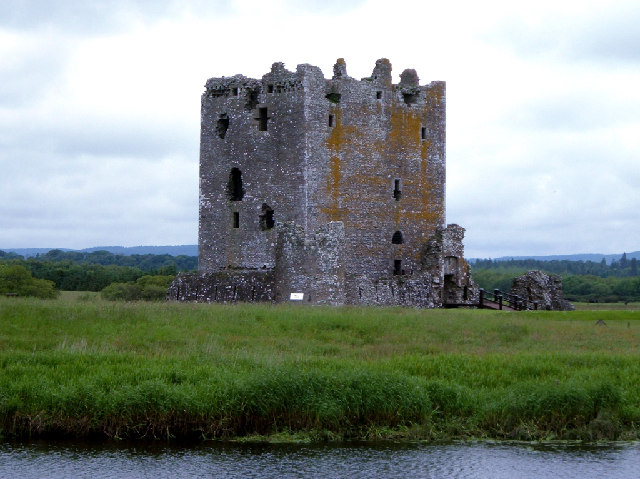
The Island of Dee, now the location of the late medieval Threave Castle, viewed from the south-east; it was probably this island that Uhtred retreated to when he was besieged by Donnchadh's brother Máel Coluim.

Roger of Hoveden described Uhtred of Galloway as a consanguinus ("cousin") of King Henry II of England, an assertion that has given rise to the theory that, since Gille-Brighde is never described as such, they must have been from different mothers. Fergus must therefore, according to the theory, have had two wives, one of whom was a bastard daughter of Henry I; that is, Uhtred and his descendants were related to the English royal family, while Gille-Brighde and his descendants were not. According to historian G.W.S. Barrow, the theory is disproved by one English royal document, written in the name of King John of England, which likewise asserts that Donnchadh was John's cousin.

It is unclear how many siblings Donnchadh had, but at least two are known. The first, Máel Coluim, led the forces that besieged Gille-Brighde's brother Uhtred on "Dee island" (probably Threave) in Galloway in 1174. This Máel Coluim captured Uhtred, who subsequently, in addition to being blinded and castrated, had his tongue cut out. Nothing more is known of Máel Coluim's life; there is speculation by some modern historians that he was illegitimate. Another brother appears in the records of Paisley Abbey. In 1233, one Gille-Chonaill Manntach, "the Stammerer" (recorded Gillokonel Manthac), gave evidence regarding a land dispute in Strathclyde; the document described him as the brother of the Earl of Carrick, who at that time was Donnchadh.

== Exile and return ==
In 1160, Máel Coluim mac Eanric (Malcolm IV), king of the Scots, forced Fergus into retirement and brought Galloway under his overlordship. It is likely that from 1161 until 1174, Fergus' sons Gille-Brighde and Uhtred shared the lordship of the Gall-Gaidhil under the Scottish king's authority, with Gille-Brighde in the west and Uhtred in the east. When in 1174 the Scottish king William the Lion was captured during an invasion of England, the brothers responded by rebelling against the Scottish monarch. Subsequently, they fought each other, with Donnchadh's father ultimately prevailing.

Having defeated his brother, Gille-Brighde unsuccessfully sought to become a direct vassal of Henry II, king of England. An agreement was obtained with Henry in 1176, Gille-Brighde promising to pay him 1000 marks of silver and handing over his son Donnchadh as a hostage. Donnchadh was taken into the care of Hugh de Morwic, sheriff of Cumberland. The agreement seems to have included recognising Donnchadh's right to inherit Gille-Brighde's lands, for nine years later, in the aftermath of Gille-Brighde's death, when Uhtred's son Lochlann (Roland) invaded western Galloway, Roger of Hoveden described the action as "contrary to [Henry's] prohibition".

The activities of Donnchadh's father Gille-Brighde after 1176 are unclear, but some time before 1184 King William raised an army to punish Gille-Brighde "and the other Galwegians who had wasted his land and slain his vassals"; he held off the endeavour, probably because he was worried about the response of Gille-Brighde's protector Henry II. There were raids on William's territory until Gille-Brighde's death in 1185. The death of Gille-Brighde prompted Donnchadh's cousin Lochlann, supported by the Scottish king, to attempt a takeover, thus threatening Donnchadh's inheritance. At that time Donnchadh was still a hostage in the care of Hugh de Morwic.

The Gesta Annalia I claimed that Donnchadh's patrimony was defended by chieftains called Somhairle ("Samuel"), Gille-Patraic, and Eanric Mac Cennetig ("Henry Mac Kennedy"). Lochlann and his army met these men in battle on 4 July 1185 and, according to the Chronicle of Melrose, killed Gille-Patraic and a substantial number of his warriors. Another battle took place on 30 September, and although Lochlann's forces were probably victorious, killing opponent leader Gille-Coluim, the encounter led to the death of Lochlann's unnamed brother. Lochlann's activities provoked a response from King Henry who, according to historian Richard Oram, "was not prepared to accept a fait accompli that disinherited the son of a useful vassal, flew in the face of the settlement which he had imposed ... and deprived him of influence over a vitally strategic zone on the north-west periphery of his realm".

According to Hoveden, in May 1186 Henry ordered the king and magnates of Scotland to subdue Lochlann; in response, Lochlann "collected numerous horse and foot and obstructed the entrances to Galloway and its roads to what extent he could". Richard Oram did not believe that the Scots really intended to do this, as Lochlann was their dependent and probably acted with their consent; this, Oram argued, explains why Henry himself raised an army and marched north to Carlisle. When Henry arrived he instructed King William and his brother David, Earl of Huntingdon, to come to Carlisle, and to bring Lochlann with them.

Lochlann ignored Henry's summons until an embassy consisting of Hugh de Puiset, Bishop of Durham and Justiciar Ranulf de Glanville provided him with hostages as a guarantee of his safety; when he agreed to travel to Carlisle with the king's ambassadors. Hoveden wrote that Lochlann was allowed to keep the land that his father Uhtred had held "on the day he was alive and dead", but that the land of Gille-Brighde that was claimed by Donnchadh, son of Gille-Brighde, would be settled in Henry's court, to which Lochlann would be summoned. Lochlann agreed to these terms. King William and Earl David swore an oath to enforce the agreement, with Jocelin, Bishop of Glasgow, instructed to excommunicate any party that should breach their oath.

== Ruler of Carrick ==
There is no record of any subsequent court hearing, but the Gesta Annalia I relates that Donnchadh was granted Carrick on condition of peace with Lochlann, and emphasises the role of King William (as opposed to Henry) in resolving the conflict. Richard Oram has pointed out that Donnchadh's grant to Melrose Abbey between 1189 and 1198 was witnessed by his cousin Lochlann, evidence perhaps that relations between the two had become more cordial. Although no details are given any contemporary source, Donnchadh gained possession of some of his father's land in the west of the kingdom of Gall-Gaidhil, namely the "earldom" of Carrick.

When Donnchadh adopted or was given the title of earl (Latin: comes), or in his own language mormaer, is a debated question. Historian Alan Orr Anderson argued that he began using the title of comes between 1214 and 1216, based on Donnchadh's appearance as a witness to two charters issued by Thomas de Colville; the first, known as Melrose 193 (this being its number in Cosmo Innes's printed version of the cartulary), was dated by Anderson to 1214. In this charter, Donnchadh has no title. By contrast, Donnchadh was styled comes in a charter dated by Anderson to 1216, Melrose 192.

Oram pointed out that Donnchadh was styled comes in a grant to Melrose Abbey witnessed by Richard de Morville (Melrose 32), who died in 1196. If the wording in this charter is accurate, then Donnchadh was using the title before Richard's death: that is, in or before 1196. Furthermore, while Anderson dated Melrose 192 with reference to Abbot William III de Courcy (abbot of Melrose from 1215 to 1216), Oram identified Abbot William as Abbot William II (abbot from 1202 to 1206). Whenever Donnchadh adopted the title, he is the first known "earl" of the region.

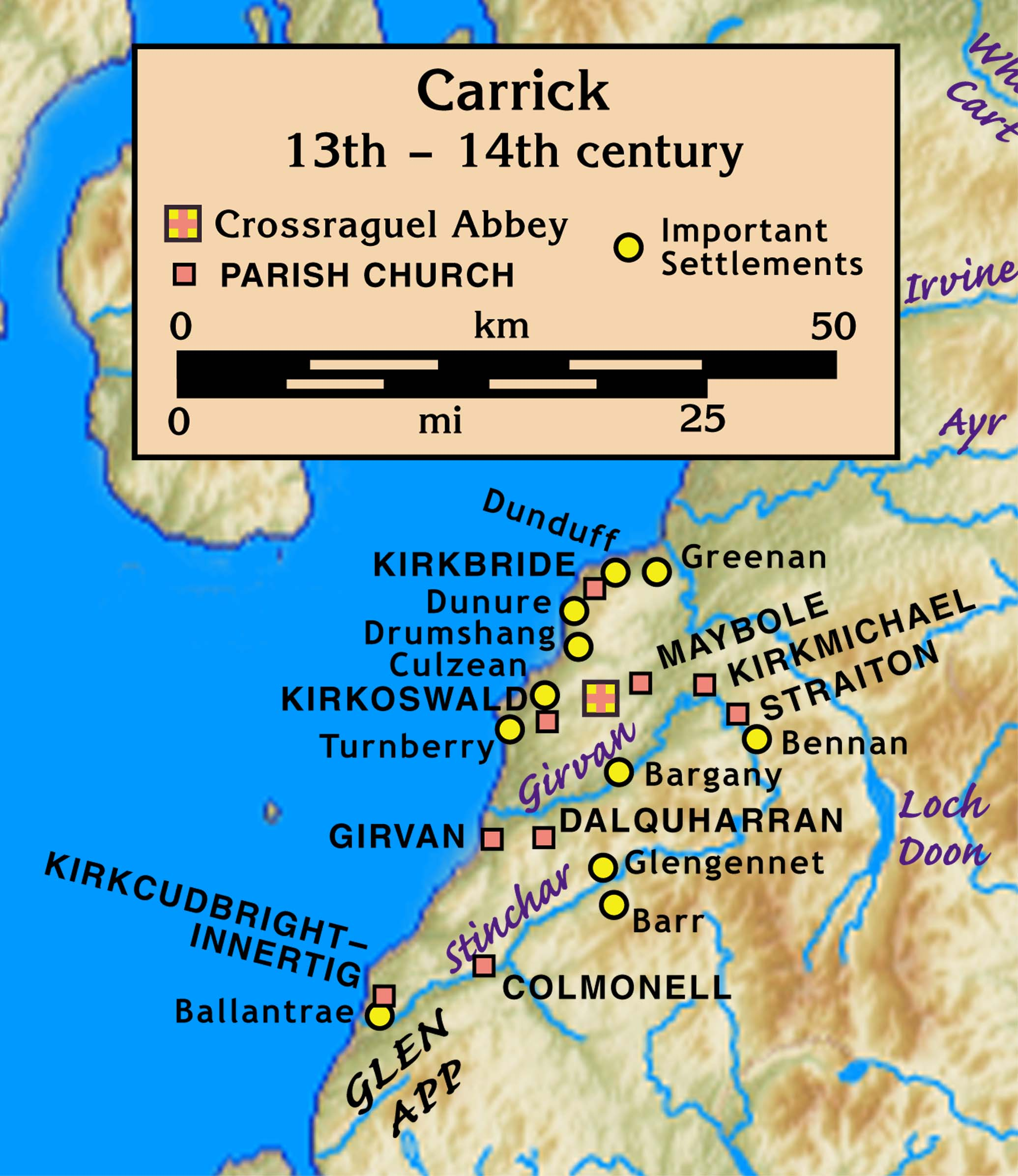
Settlements and churches of Carrick in and around Donnchadh's era

Carrick was located in the Firth of Clyde, in the Irish Sea region, far from the main centres of Scottish and Anglo-Norman influence lying to its east and south-east. Carrick was separated from Kyle in the north and north-east by the River Doon, and from Galloway proper by Glenapp and by the adjacent hills and forests. There were three main rivers, the Doon, the Girvan and the Stinchar, though most of the province was hilly, meaning that most wealth came from animal husbandry rather than arable farming. The population of Carrick, like that in neighbouring Galloway, consisted of kin groups governed by a "chief" or "captain" (cenn, Latin capitaneus). Above these captains was the Cenn Cineoil ("kenkynolle"), the "kin-captain" of Carrick, a position held by the mormaer; it was not until after Donnchadh's death that these two positions were separated. The best-recorded groups are Donnchadh's own group (known only as de Carrick, "of Carrick") and the Mac Cennétig (Kennedy) family, who seem to have provided the earldom's hereditary stewards.

The population was governed under these leaders by a customary law that remained distinct from the common law of Scotland for the remainder of the Middle Ages. One documented aspect of Carrick and Galloway law was the power of sergeants (an original Gaelic word Latinised as Kethres), officials of the earl or of other captains, to claim one night of free hospitality (a privilege called sorryn et frithalos), and to accuse and arrest with little restriction. The personal demesne, or lands, of the earl was probably extensive in Donnchadh's time; in 1260, during the minority of Donnchadh's descendant Countess Marjory of Carrick, an assessment made by the Scottish king showed that the earls had estates throughout the province, in upland locations like Straiton, Glengennet and Bennan, as well as in the east in locations such as Turnberry and Dalquharran.

== Relations with the church ==
Records exist for Donnchadh's religious patronage, and these records provide evidence for Donnchadh's associates as well as the earl himself. Around 1200, Earl Donnchadh allowed the monks of Melrose Abbey use of saltpans from his land at Turnberry. Between 1189 and 1198 he had granted the church of Maybothelbeg ("Little Maybole") and the lands of Beath (Bethóc) to this Cistercian house. The grant is mentioned by the Chronicle of Melrose, under the year 1193:

Donnchadh, son of Gille-Brighde, of Galloway, gave to God and St Mary and the monks of Melrose a certain part of their land in Carrick that is called Maybole, in perpetual alms, for the salvation of his soul, and the souls of all his relatives; in presence of bishop Jocelin, and many other witnesses.

These estates were very rich, and became attached to Melrose's "super-grange" at Mauchline in Kyle. In 1285 Melrose Abbey was able to persuade the earl of the time to force its tenants in Carrick to use the lex Anglicana (the "English law").

Witness to both grants were some prominent churchman connected with Melrose: magnates like Earl Donnchadh II of Fife, the latter's son Máel Coluim, Gille Brigte, Earl of Strathearn, as well as probable members of Donnchadh's retinue, like Gille-Osald mac Gille-Anndrais, Gille-nan-Náemh mac Cholmain, Gille-Chríst Bretnach ("the Briton"), and Donnchadh's chamberlain Étgar mac Muireadhaich. Áedh son of the mormaer of Lennox also witnessed these grants, and sometime between 1208 and 1214 Donnchadh (as "Lord Donnchadh") subscribed (i.e. his name was written at the bottom, as a "witness" to) a charter of Maol Domhnaich, Earl of Lennox, son and heir of Mormaer Ailean II, to the bishopric of Glasgow regarding the church of Campsie.

There are records of patronage towards the nunnery of North Berwick, a house founded by Donnchadh's probable maternal grandfather or great-grandfather Donnchadh I of Fife. He gave that house the rectorship of the church of St Cuthbert of Maybole sometime between 1189 and 1250. In addition to Maybole, he gave the church of St Brigit at Kirkbride to the nuns, as well as a grant of three marks from a place called Barrebeth. Relations with the bishop of Glasgow, within whose diocese Carrick lay, are also attested. For instance, on 21 July 1225, at Ayr in Kyle, Donnchadh made a promise of tithes to Walter, Bishop of Glasgow.

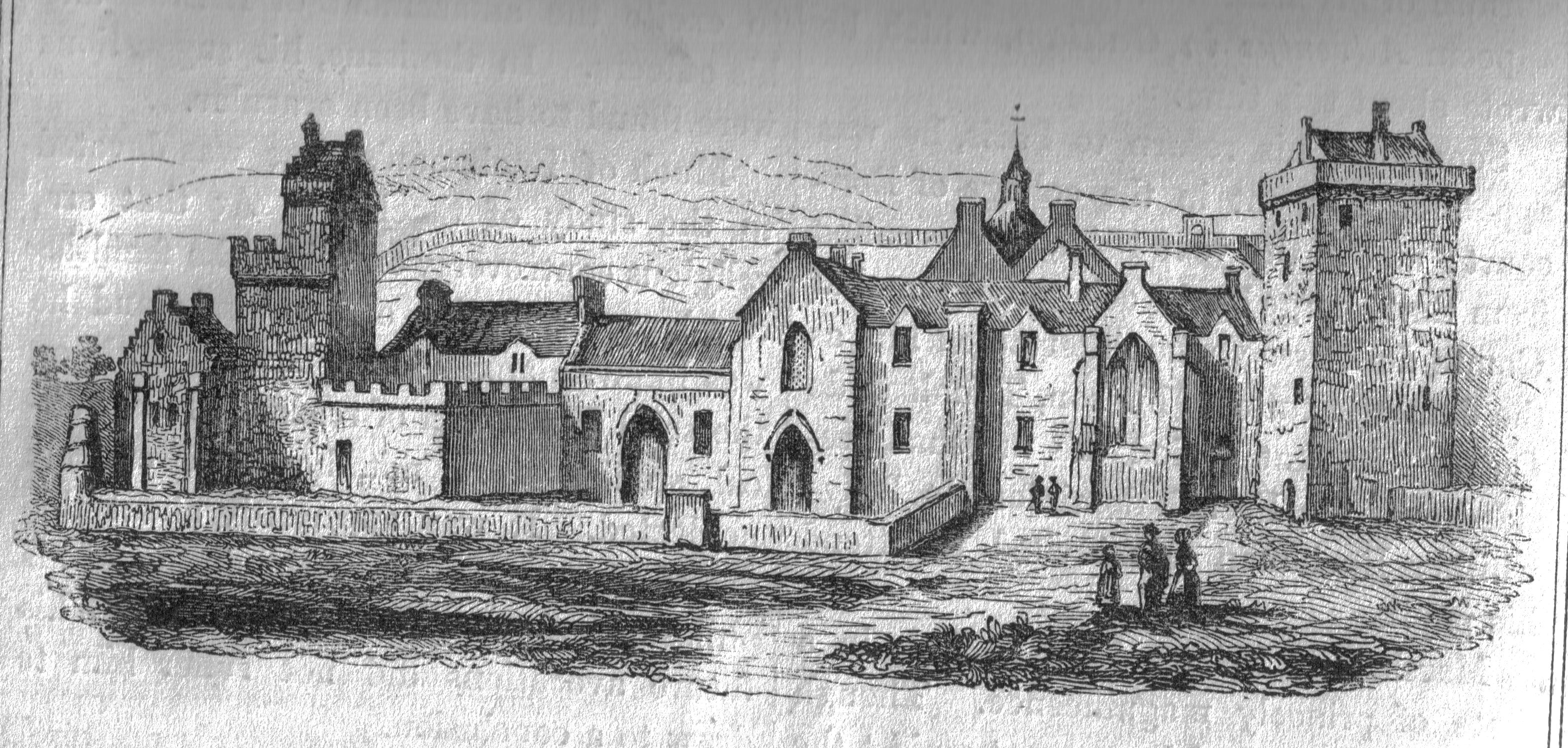
James A. Morris' illustration of how the Cluniac Abbey of Crosssraguel roughly looked before its destruction in the early modern era

Donnchadh's most important long-term patronage was a series of gifts to the Cluniac Abbey of Paisley that led to the foundation of a monastery at Crossraguel (Crois Riaghail). At some date before 1227 he granted Crossraguel and a place called Suthblan to Paisley, a grant confirmed by Pope Honorius III on 23 January 1227. A royal confirmation by King Alexander III of Scotland dated to 25 August 1236 shows that Donnchadh granted the monastery the churches of Kirkoswald (Turnberry), Straiton and Dalquharran (Old Dailly). He may also have given the churches of Girvan and Kirkcudbright-Innertig (Ballantrae).

It is clear from several sources that Donnchadh made these grants on the condition that the Abbey of Paisley establish a Cluniac house in Carrick, however, the Abbey did not fulfil this condition, arguing that it was not obliged to do so. The Bishop of Glasgow intervened in 1244 and determined that a house of Cluniac monks from Paisley should indeed be founded there, that the house should be exempt from the jurisdiction of Paisley save recognition of the common Cluniac Order, but that the Abbot of Paisley could visit the house annually. After the foundation, Paisley was to hand over its Carrick properties to the newly established monastery.

A papal bull of 11 July 1265 reveals that Paisley Abbey built only a small oratory served by Paisley monks. Twenty years after the bishop's ruling Paisley complained to the papacy, which led Pope Clement IV to issue two bulls, dated 11 June 1265 and 6 February 1266, appointing mandatories to settle the dispute; the results of their deliberations are unknown. Crossraguel was not finally founded until about two decades after Donnchadh's death, probably by 1270; its first abbot, Abbot Patrick, is attested between 1274 and 1292.

== Anglo-French world ==
In secular affairs one of the few important facts recorded about Donnchadh was his marriage to Avelina (FitzAlan) Stewart (Paisley, 1171-?), daughter of Alan fitz Walter, lord of Strathgryfe and [northern] Kyle, and High Steward of Scotland, by second wife Alesta of Mar. The marriage is known from Roger of Hoveden's Chronica, which recorded that in 1200 Donnchadh:

Carried off (rapuit) Avelina, daughter of Alan fitz Walter, lord of Renfrew, before William, king of Scotland, returned from England to his own land. And hence that king was exceeding wroth; and he took from Alan fitz Walter twenty-four pledges that he would preserve the peace with his and with his land, and take the law about his law.

The marriage bound Donnchadh closer to the Anglo-French circles of the northern part of the region south of the Forth, while from Alan's point of view it was part of a series of moves to expand his territory further into former Gall-Gaidhil lands, moves that had included an alliance a few years earlier with another Firth of Clyde Gaelic prince, Raghnall mac Somhairle (Rǫgnvaldr, son of Sumarliði or Somerled).

Charter evidence reveals two Anglo-Normans present in Donnchadh's territory. Some of Donnchadh's charters to Melrose were subscribed by an Anglo-Norman knight named Roger de Skelbrooke, who appears to have been Lord of Greenan. De Skelbrooke himself made grants to Melrose regarding the land of Drumeceisuiene (i.e. Drumshang), grants confirmed by "his lord" Donnchadh. This knight gave Melrose fishing rights in the River Doon, rights confirmed by Donnchadh too and later by Roger's son-in-law and successor Ruaidhri mac Gille-Escoib (Raderic mac Gillescop).

The other known Anglo-French knight was Thomas de Colville. Thomas (nicknamed "the Scot") was the younger son of the lord of Castle Bytham, a significant landowner in Yorkshire and Lincolnshire Around 1190 he was constable of Dumfries, the royal castle which had been planted in Strathnith by the Scottish king, probably overrun by the Gall-Gaidhil in the revolt of 1174 before being restored afterwards. Evidence that he possessed land in the region under Donnchadh's overlordship comes from the opening years of the 13th century when he made a grant of land around Dalmellington to the Cistercians of Vaudey Abbey. Historians G.W.S. Barrow and Hector MacQueen both thought that Thomas' nickname "the Scot" (which then could mean "a Gael" as well as someone from north of the Forth), is a reflection of Thomas' exposure to the culture of the south-west during his career there.

It is not known how these two men acquired the patronage of Donnchadh or his family. Writing in 1980, Barrow could find no cause for their presence in the area, and declared that they were "for the present impossible to account for". As Richard Oram pointed out, in one of his charters Roger de Skelbrooke called Donnchadh's father Gille-Brighde "my lord", indicating that Donnchadh probably inherited them in his territory. Neither of them left traceable offspring in the region, and even if they did represent for Carrick what could have been the embryonic stages of the kind of Normanisation that was taking place further east, the process was halted during Donnchadh's period as ruler. Vaudey Abbey transferred the land granted to it by Donnchadh to Melrose Abbey in 1223, because it was "useless and dangerous to them, both on account of the absence of law and order, and by reason of the insidious attacks of a barbarous people".

== Ireland ==
The Anglo-Norman John de Courcy, whose early life was probably spent just across the Irish Sea in Cumbria, invaded the over-kingdom of Ulaid in north-eastern Ireland in 1177 with the aim of conquest. After defeating the region's king Ruaidhrí Mac Duinn Shléibhe, de Courcy was able to take control of a large amount of territory, though not without encountering further resistance among the native Irish. Cumbria was only a short distance from the lands of the Gall-Gaidhil, and around 1180 John de Courcy married Donnchadh's cousin Affrica, whose father Guðrøðr (Gofraidh), King of the Isles, was the son of Donnchadh's aunt. Guðrøðr, who was thus Donnchadh's cousin, had in turn married a daughter of the Meic Lochlainn ruler of Tir Eoghain, another Irish kingdom.

The earliest information on Donnchadh's and indeed Gall-Gaidhil involvement in Ulster comes from Roger of Hoveden's entry about the death of Jordan de Courcy, John's brother. It related that in 1197, after Jordan's death, John sought vengeance and

Fought a battle with the petty-kings of Ireland, of whom he put some to flight, slew others, and subjugated their territories; of which he gave no small part to Donnchadh, son of Gille-Brighde, the son of Fergus, who, at the time that the said John was about to engage with the Irish, came to assist him with no small body of troops.

Donnchadh's interests in the area were damaged when de Courcy lost his territory in eastern Ulster to his rival Hugh de Lacy in 1203. John de Courcy, with help from his wife's brother King Rǫgnvaldr Guðrøðarson (Raghnall mac Gofraidh) and perhaps from Donnchadh, tried to regain his principality, but was initially unsuccessful. De Courcy's fortunes were boosted when Hugh de Lacy (then Earl of Ulster) and his associate William III de Briouze, themselves fell foul of John; the king campaigned in Ireland against them in 1210, a campaign that forced de Briouze to return to Wales and de Lacy to flee to St Andrews in Scotland.

English records attest to Donnchadh's continued involvement in Ireland. One document, after describing how William de Briouze became the king's enemy in England and Ireland, records that after John arrived in Ireland in July 1210:

[William de Briouze's] wife [Matilda] fled to Scotland with William and Reinald her sons, and her private retinue, in the company of Hugh de Lacy, and when the king was at Carrickfergus Castle, a certain friend and cousin of his of Galloway, namely Donnchadh of Carrick, reported to the king that he had taken her and her daughter the wife of Roger de Mortimer, and William junior, with his wife and two sons, but Hugh de Lacy and Reinald escaped.

The Histoire des Ducs de Normandie recorded that William and Matilda had voyaged to the Isle of Man, en route from Ireland to Galloway, where they were captured. Matilda was imprisoned by the king and died of starvation.

Another document, this one preserved in an Irish memoranda roll dating to the reign of King Henry VI (reigned 1422–1461), records that after John's Irish expedition of 1210, Donnchadh controlled extensive territory in County Antrim, namely the settlements of Larne and Glenarm with 50 carucates of land in between, a territory similar to the later barony of Glenarm Upper. King John had given or recognised Donnchadh's possession of this territory, and that of Donnchadh's nephew Alaxandair (Alexander), as a reward for his help; similarly, John had given Donnchadh's cousins Ailean and Tómas, sons of Lochlann, a huge lordship equivalent to 140 knight's fees that included most of northern County Antrim and County Londonderry, the reward for use of their soldiers and galleys.

By 1219 Donnchadh and his nephew appear to have lost all or most of his Irish land; a document of that year related that the Justiciar of Ireland, Geoffrey de Marisco, had dispossessed ("disseised") them believing they had conspired against the king in the rebellion of 1215–6. The king, John's successor Henry III, found that this was not true and ordered the Justiciar to restore Donnchadh and his nephew to their lands. By 1224, Donnchadh had still not regained these lands, and de Lacy's adherents were gaining more ground in the region. King Henry III repeated his earlier but ineffective instructions: he ordered Henry de Loundres, Archbishop of Dublin and new Justiciar of Ireland, to restore to Donnchadh "the remaining part of the land given to him by King John in Ireland, unless anyone held it by his father's own precept".

Later in the same year Donnchadh wrote to King Henry. His letter was as follows:

[Donnchadh] Thanks him for the mandate which he directed by him to the Justiciar of Ireland, to restore his land there, of which he had been disseized on account of the English war; but as the land has not yet been restored, he asks the King to give by him a more effectual command to the Justiciar.

Henry's response was a writ to his Justiciar:

King John granted to Donnchadh of Carrick, land in Ulster called Balgeithelauche [probably Ballygalley, county Antrim]. He says Hugh de Lacy disseized him and gave it to another. The King commands the Earl to inquire who has it, and its tenure; and if his right is insufficient, to give Donnchadh the land during the king's pleasure. At Bedford.

It is unlikely that Donnchadh ever regained his territory; after Hugh was formally restored to the Earldom of Ulster in 1227, Donnchadh's land was probably controlled by the Bisset family. Historian Séan Duffy argues that the Bissets (later known as the "Bissets of the Glens") helped Hugh de Lacy, and probably ended up with Donnchadh's territory as a reward.

== Death and legacy ==
Donnchadh was said by the Martyrology of Glasgow to have died on 13 June 1250. He was succeeded in the earldom by Niall. The traditional view, going back to the 19th century, is that Niall was Donnchadh's son. This view has been undermined with more recent research by genealogist Andrew MacEwen, who has argued that Niall was not the son of Donnchadh, but rather his grandson, a view embraced by leading Scottish medievalist Professor G.W.S. Barrow. According to this argument, Donnchadh's son and intended heir was Cailean mac Donnchaidh (alias Nicholaus), who as his son and heir, issued a charter in Donnchadh's lifetime, but seemingly predeceased him. It was further suggested that Cailean's wife, Earl Niall's mother, was a daughter of the Tir Eoghain king Niall Ruadh Ó Neill, tying in with Donnchadh's Irish activities, accounting for the use of the name Niall, and explaining the strong alliance with the Ó Neill held by Niall's grandsons.

Another of Donnchadh's sons, Eóin (John), owned the land of Straiton. He was involved in the Galwegian revolt of Gille Ruadh in 1235, during which he attacked some churches in the diocese of Glasgow. He received a pardon by granting patronage of the church of Straiton and the land of Hachinclohyn to William de Bondington, Bishop of Glasgow, which was confirmed by Alexander II in 1244. Two other sons, Ailean (Alan) and Alaxandair (Alexander), are attested subscribing to Donnchadh and Cailean's charters to North Berwick. A Melrose charter mentions that Ailean was parson of Kirchemanen. Cailean, and presumably Donnchadh's other legitimate sons, died before their father.

Donnchadh's probable grandson, Niall, was earl for only six years and died leaving no son but four daughters, only the eldest, Marjorie, is known by name. She was his successor and married in turn Adam of Kilconquhar (died 1271) and Robert de Brus, 6th Lord of Annandale. Marjorie's eldest son Robert the Bruce became King of Scotland. King Robert's brother, Edward Bruce, became for a short time High King of Ireland.

Under the Bruces and their successors to the Scottish throne, the title Earl of Carrick, became a prestigious honorific title usually given to a son of the king or intended heir. At some time between 1250 and 1256 Earl Niall, anticipating that the earldom would pass to someone from another family, issued a charter to Lochlann (Roland) of Carrick, a son or grandson of one of Donnchadh's brothers. The charter granted Lochlann the title Cenn Cineoil, "head of the kindred", a position which brought the right to lead the men of Carrick in war. The charter also conferred possession of the office of baillie of Carrick under whoever was earl. Precedent had been established here by other native families of Scotland, something similar having already taken place in Fife; it was a way of ensuring that the kin-group retained strong locally based male leadership even when the newly imposed common law of Scotland forced the comital title to pass into the hands of another family. By 1372 the office had passed—probably by marriage—to the Kennedy family of Dunure.

The 17th-century genealogical compilation known as Ane Accompt of the Genealogie of the Campbells by Robert Duncanson, minister of Campbeltown, claimed that "Efferic" (i.e. Affraic or Afraig), wife of Gilleasbaig of Menstrie (fl. 1263–6) and mother of Campbell progenitor Cailean Mór, was the daughter of one Cailean (anglicised Colin), "Lord of Carrick". Partly because Ane Accompt is a credible witness to much earlier material, the claim is thought probable. Thus Donnchadh was likely the great-grandfather of Cailean Mór, a lineage that explains the popularity of the names Donnchadh (Duncan) and Cailean (Colin) among later Campbells, as well as their close alliance to King Robert I during the Scottish Wars of Independence.
