= Ardscotnish =

Coordinates: 56.133°N 5.487°W

Ardscotnish, also known as Ardskeodnish, is a former location, in Argyll and Bute, Scotland approximating to the present parish of Kilmartin.
