= Ane Accompt of the Genealogie of the Campbells =

Source documenting the history of Clan Campbell

Ane Accompt of the Genealogie of the Campbells is a seventeenth-century source documenting the history of Clan Campbell.

== Description ==
The history is preserved in manuscript form in NLS Advocates' MS 32.6.13, 34.5.22. The work appears to date to c. 1670×1676. A transcription of the text was published in 1916.

The history is the work of Raibeart Duncansone, minister of Campbeltown. Raibeart is stated to have been assisted by several sennachies, which could be evidence that members of the MacLachlan learned kindred contributed to the history.

The history seems to have been based upon the now-lost Colvin's Genealogy of the Campbells, composed by Alexander Colville in 1650×1660. Ane Accompt was in turn a source for other important Campbell histories, such as the Craignish History (also derived from Colville's now-lost work) and the Auchinbreck History.
