= Máel Coluim I, Earl of Fife =

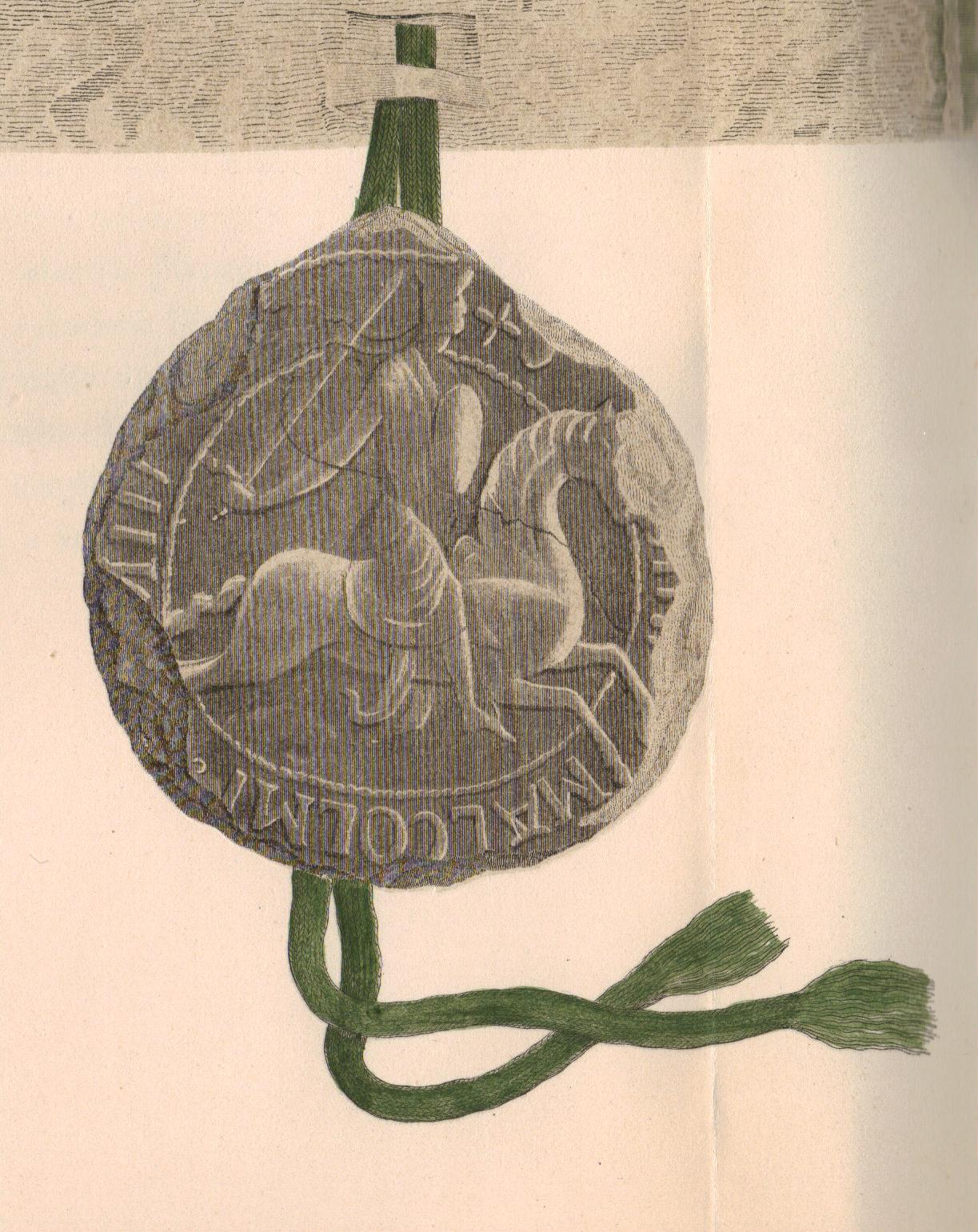
- Seal of Máel Coluim I
- Tenure: 1204–1228
- Predecessor: Donnchad II, Earl of Fife
- Successor: Máel Coluim II, Earl of Fife

Mormaer Máel Coluim of Fife (1204–1228), or Maol Choluim anglicised as Malcolm, was one of the mormaers of Fife.

He married Matilda, the daughter of Gille Brigte, the mormaer of Strathearn. He is credited with the foundation of Culross Abbey. Upon the death of Máel Coluim I, probably in 1228, he was succeeded by his nephew Máel Coluim II, son of Máel Coluim I's brother Donnchadh, son of Donnchadh II.

== Bibliography ==
- Bannerman, John, "MacDuff of Fife," in A. Grant & K.Stringer (eds.) Medieval Scotland: Crown, Lordship and Community, Essays Presented to G.W.S. Barrow, (Edinburgh, 1993), pp. 20–38

Preceded by Donnchadh II	Mormaer of Fife; 1204–1228	Succeeded by Máel Coluim II
