= Patrick I, Earl of Dunbar =

13th-century Anglo-Gaelic noble

Patrick I (c.1152 – 1232), Earl of Dunbar and lord of Beanley, was a 13th-century Anglo-Scottish noble.

He was the eldest son of Waltheof, Earl of Dunbar and Alina, and succeeded to his father's titles upon the latter's death in 1182.

Patrick was one of the most important magnates to Kings William and Alexander II of Scotland, frequently witnessing their charters and traveling in their entourages whenever they went to the south of England to perform homage to the King of England for the properties in that realm.

Patrick also served as Justiciar of Lothian as well as Warden of Berwick-upon-Tweed. Like his predecessors (who were originally of the kindred of the native English earls of Northumberland), some of Patrick's most important lands were in northern England. Patrick's close association with the Scottish kings in fact got him in trouble, and perhaps because of Alexander II's pursuit of claims to the earldom of Northumberland, Waltheof found himself temporarily deprived of some of his lands by King John of England.

Patrick married (1) Ada (died 1200), an illegitimate daughter of King William the Lion, by whom he had four sons and a daughter:

- Patrick (his successor),
- William, who witnessed a charter as "fratre Comitis" c. 1240 – 1248
- Robert,
- Fergus,
- Ada, who married her second cousin Sir William de Greenlaw (son of Sir Patrick de Greenlaw, son of Gospatric III, Earl of Lothian). Her dowry was Home Castle, and Sir William later became known as 'de Home' in her right. The couple were progenitors of the Home family.

His first wife predeceasing him, Patrick married again: (2) Christina, widow of William de Brus, 3rd Lord of Annandale. No children are known by this marriage.

The Earl of Dunbar died on 31 December 1232. He was buried at the Cistercian nunnery of Eccles, Berwickshire.

== Sources ==
- McDonald, Andrew, 'Patrick, fourth earl of Dunbar (d. 1232)’, Oxford Dictionary of National Biography, Oxford University Press, 2004 retrieved 28 Nov 2006
- McDonald, Andrew, 'Waltheof, third earl of Lothian (d. 1182)’, Oxford Dictionary of National Biography, Oxford University Press, 2004 retrieved 28 Nov 2006

Preceded by Waltheof	Earl of Dunbar; 1182–1232	Succeeded by Patrick II
Preceded by (?) Walter Olifard the Elder	Justiciar of Lothian; 1195–1205	Succeeded by David Lindsay the Elder & Gervase Avenel
