= Peter de Birmingham =

Peter de Birmingham or Peter de Bermingham may refer to:

- Peter de Birmingham (fl. 1154–1166), lord of Birmingham
- Peter de Birmingham (fl. 1213–1215), lord of Birmingham
- Peter de Bermingham (died 1254), lord of Tethmoy, Dunmore, and Tireragh in Ireland
- Peter de Bermingham (died 1308), lord of Tethmoy and Dunmore in Ireland
