= Máel Coluim II, Earl of Fife =

Scottish noble

Máel Coluim II mac Donnchaidh Mac Duibh (Malcolm II, son of Duncan, Macduff)
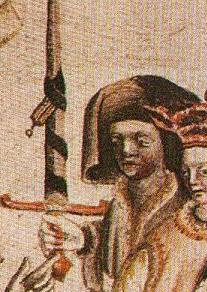
- The Mormaer of Fife as depicted at the inauguration of Alexander III in a late-medieval manuscript of Walter Bower's Scotichronicon
- Born: Early 13th century
- Died: 1266
- Other name: Maol-Choluim or Malcolm II of Fife
- Title: Mormaer ("Earl") of Fife
- Term: 1228–1266
- Predecessor: Máel Coluim I
- Successor: Colbán
- Spouse(s): Susanna ferch Llywelyn; Helen (or Elen)
- Children: Colbán; unknown son stylled MacDuibh ("Macduff")
- Parent(s): Donnchadh (Duncan), son of Donnchadh II, Earl of Fife
- Relatives: Máel Coluim I (uncle)

Máel Coluim II (or Maol Choluim II, usually anglicized as Malcolm II), was a 13th-century Mormaer of Fife who ruled the mormaerdom or earldom of Fife between 1228 and 1266. He was the nephew of Máel Coluim I, the previous mormaer, and the son of Máel Coluim I's brother Donnchadh, son of Donnchadh II.

He is one of the Scottish magnates whose name occurred as a guarantor in the Treaty of York on 25 September 1237. He participated in the famous inauguration of King Alexander III of Scotland at Scone on 13 July 1249, where the mormaers of Fife had a traditional senior role in the coronation. He played a role during the minority of Alexander III of Scotland, being appointed one of the guardians of the king on 20 September 1255.

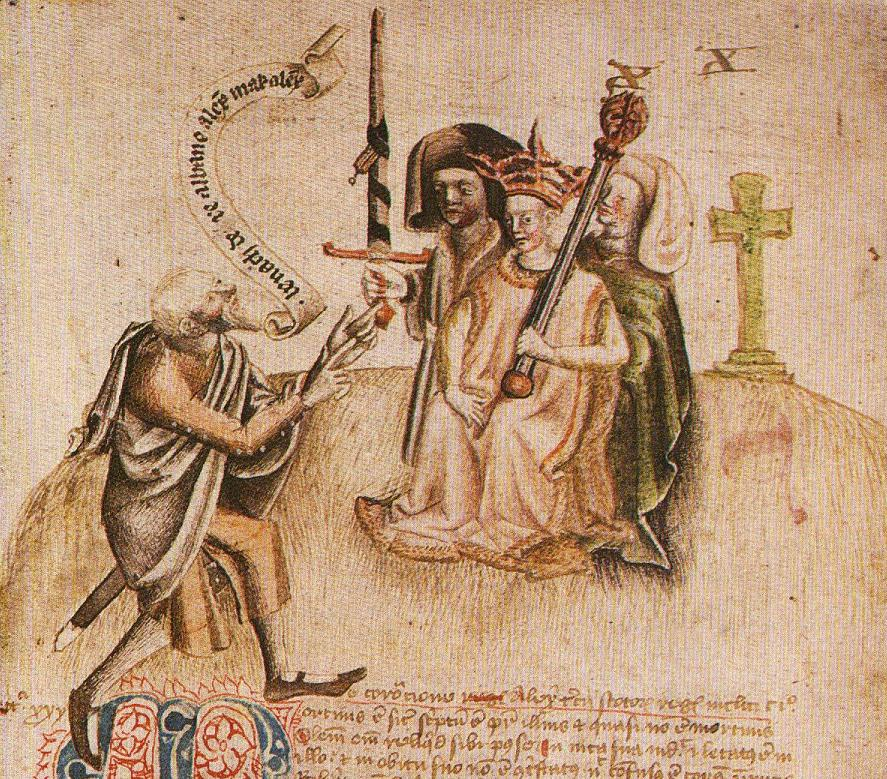
Coronation of King Alexander on Moot Hill, Scone. He is being greeted by the ollamh rígh, the royal poet, who is addressing him with the proclamation "Benach De Re Albanne" (= Beannachd Dé Rígh Alban, "God Bless the King of Scotland"); the poet goes on to recite Alexander's genealogy. By Alexander's side is Máel Coluim II, Earl of Fife holding the sword.

He appears to have had a close relationship with Henry III of England, both during the minority and after, and in Scotland may have been allied with Alan Durward. He was fined in Northumberland on 24 April 1256, for not appearing before royal justices on the first day of their session, as presumably ordered. He disappears from the records after the coup against the minority administration in 1256–57, but reappears a few years later when he is recorded swearing an oath to Henry to promise to maintain the position of the young king and queen when the latter, Henry III's daughter Margaret, went to England in 1260.

Máel Coluim II died in 1266. He is traditionally said to have married Helen, daughter of Llwyelyn the Great in 1230, who after Máel Coluim's death married the Mormaer of Mar, Domhnall I. However, genealogical inconsistencies indicate that the daughter of Llywelyn he married was actually Susanna, fl. 1228, and that his widow Helen who married Domhnall I after 1266 was an entirely different person. He had two sons who are known to us. The elder was Colbán, to whom the mormaerdom passed after Máel Coluim's death. Chieftaincy of Clan Meic Duibh went to another son, whose name, however, is unknown as he was only referred to by his title MacDuibh. Máel Coluim appears from later records to have granted lands to this younger son, which were later dispossessed by William Wishart, Bishop of St Andrews, later backed by King John de Balliol, against whom MacDuibh appealed to King Edward I of England. MacDuibh died leading the men of Fife in the Battle of Falkirk alongside William Wallace.

== Bibliography ==
- Bannerman, John, "MacDuff of Fife", in A. Grant & K.Stringer (eds.) Medieval Scotland: Crown, Lordship and Community, Essays Presented to G.W.S. Barrow (Edinburgh, 1993), pp. 20–38
- McDonald, Andrew, "Macduff family, earls of Fife (per. c. 1095–1371)", in the Oxford Dictionary of National Biography, Oxford University Press, 2004, accessed 8 Aug 2007
- Paul, James Balfour, The Scots Peerage, Vol. IV (Edinburgh, 1907)

Preceded by Máel Coluim I	Mormaer of Fife; 1228–1266	Succeeded by Colbán
