= Earl of Dunbar =

Head of a comital lordship in Scotland

- Earldom of March The Arms of the Realm and Ancient Local Principalities of Scotland

The title Earl of Dunbar, also called Earl of Lothian or Earl of March, applied to the head of a comital lordship in south-eastern Scotland, between the early 12th century and the early 15th century. The first man to use the title of earl in this capacity was Gospatric II, Earl of Lothian, son of Gospatric, Earl of Northumbria. It descended to George de Dunbar, 11th Earl of March, whose titles and estates were declared forfeit by the Scottish parliament in 1435, and he retired into obscurity in England. His son Patrick retained a barony at Kilconquhar in Fife.

The title of Earl of Dunbar was revived in 1605 for George Home, 1st Lord Hume of Berwick, Chancellor of the Exchequer, and his heirs male. This title became dormant only six years after its creation, upon Home's death in 1611. Some of his kinsmen were said to be acknowledged as de jure holders of the title, but none of them ever appears to have assumed the title.

There have been no subsequent creations; however, two other peerages with similar names are Lord of Dunbar and Viscount of Dunbar.

== First creation ==
=== Using title "Earl of Lothian" ===
- Gospatric II, Earl of Lothian (died 1138)
- Gospatric III, Earl of Lothian (died 1166)

=== Using title "Earl of Dunbar" ===
- Waltheof, Earl of Dunbar (died 1182)
- Patrick I, Earl of Dunbar (1154–1232)
- Patrick II, Earl of Dunbar (1186–1249)
- Patrick III, Earl of Dunbar (1213–1289)

=== Using mainly the title "Earl of March" ===
- Patrick IV, Earl of March (1242–1308)
- Patrick V, Earl of March (1284–1368)
- George I, Earl of March (1340–1422)
- George II, Earl of March (c. 1370–1457)

== Earls of Dunbar, Second Creation (1605) ==
- George Home, 1st Earl of Dunbar (c.1556–1611) – died without male issue

Subsequent claimants to the title

- John Home, de jure 2nd Earl of Dunbar (a 1628), brother of 1st Earl, according to the Lord Advocate in 1634, he “conceiving his fortune too mean, forebore to assume the dignity”. He died without male issue.
- George Home, de jure 3rd Earl of Dunbar (a 1637), son of Alexander Home of Manderston and nephew of 1st Earl, certified in his claim in 1634 by the same Lord Advocate.
- Alexander Home, de jure 4th Earl of Dunbar (d. 1675), son of 3rd Earl, said to have been confirmed in title by Charles II in 1651 but which does not appear in the Great Seal of Scotland. Died without male issue.
- Alexander Hume, of Manderstone, de jure 5th Earl of Dunbar (b. 1651, d. 4 January 1720 Aurich, Germany), nephew of 4th Earl. Capt. of a troop of horse in the service of the States of Holland, later Geheimrat in Aurich, Germany. To him 14 October 1689, William III, King of England, Ireland and Scotland confirmed the Earldom of Dunbar exemplifying the previous confirmation thereof by Charles II. It is not known if Alexander Hume styled himself "Earl of Dunbar" in Germany, where he and his descendants rather are known as Grafen (Counts) Hume of Manderstone. He married the daughter of Leonard Fewen, General Steward of Emden, who inherited the manor house and estate of Stikelkamp at Hesel, East Frisia. His son—Leonard Hume (1684–1741), de jure 6th Earl of Dunbar—inherited the estate in Stikelkamp from his father. Leonard married Gesina Bruncken (1701–1763).

In 1721 James Murray (c.1690–1770), second son of David Murray, 5th Viscount of Stormont, was created Earl of Dunbar, Viscount of Drumcairn and Lord of Hadykes in the Jacobite Peerage by James Francis Edward Stuart, the "Old Pretender". These creations were never recognised by the British government.

In 1776, John Home, descended from David, second son of Sir David Home of Wedderburn, appears to have had the title's privileges upheld for him (given "retour") as heir male of the Earl of Dunbar, but the service was reduced by the Court of Session, at the instance of Sir George Home of Blackadder, Bt., a descendant of Sir David through an immediate younger brother of Alexander Home, the first of Manderston (grandfather of George, 1st Earl).

In 1810 Sir John Home of Renton, Bt., served notice that he was preparing a case to lay before The House "to the title, honour, and dignity of Earl of Dunbar, as heir male to the first patentee". He appears not to have pursued the case to a conclusion.

During the 19th century Mr Home Drummond of Blair Drummond, Perthshire, as descended from, and heir male of, Patrick Home of Renton, uncle of George, 1st Earl of Dunbar, also had a claim to that peerage.

== See also ==
- Earl of March
