= List of peers 1140–1149 =

This page lists all peers who held extant titles between 1140 and 1149.

== Peerage of England ==
Title	Holder	Date gained	Date lost	Notes
Earl of Northampton (1080)	Simon Saint-Lis, 2nd Earl of Northampton	1109	1153	
Earl of Surrey (1088)	William de Warenne, 3rd Earl of Surrey	1138	1148	Died
Earl of Surrey (1088)	Isabel de Warenne, 4th Countess of Surrey	1148	1199	
Earl of Warwick (1088)	Roger de Beaumont, 2nd Earl of Warwick	1119	1153	
Earl of Buckingham (1097)	Walter Giffard, 2nd Earl of Buckingham	1102	1164	
Earl of Leicester (1107)	Robert de Beaumont, 2nd Earl of Leicester	1118	1168	
Earl of Chester (1121)	Ranulph de Gernon, 2nd Earl of Chester	1129	1153	
Earl of York (1138)	William le Gros, 1st Earl of York	1138	1179	
Earl of Gloucester (1121)	Robert, 1st Earl of Gloucester	1121	1147	Died
Earl of Gloucester (1121)	William Fitzrobert, 2nd Earl of Gloucester	1147	1183	
Earl of Hertford (1135)	Gilbert de Clare, 2nd Earl of Hertford	1136	1151	
Earl of Richmond (1136)	Alan de Bretagne, 1st Earl of Richmond	1136	1146	Died
Earl of Richmond (1136)	Conan IV, Duke of Brittany	1146	1171	
Earl of Arundel (1138)	William d'Aubigny, 1st Earl of Arundel	1138	1176	
Earl of Bedford (1138)	Hugh de Beaumont, 1st Earl of Bedford	1138	1142	Forfeit
Earl of Derby (1138)	Robert de Ferrers, 2nd Earl of Derby	1139	1162	
Earl of Pembroke (1138)	Gilbert de Clare, 1st Earl of Pembroke	1138	1147	Died
Earl of Pembroke (1138)	Richard de Clare, 2nd Earl of Pembroke	1147	1176	
Earl of Worcester (1138)	Waleran de Beaumont, 1st Earl of Worcester	1138	1145	Forfeit
Earl of Essex (1139)	Geoffrey de Mandeville, 1st Earl of Essex	1139	1144	Died
Earl of Essex (1139)	Geoffrey de Mandeville, 2nd Earl of Essex	1144	1160	
Earl of Cornwall (1140)	Alain de Bretagne, 1st Earl of Cornwall	1140	1141	New creation; Deprived
Earl of Norfolk (1140)	Hugh Bigod, 1st Earl of Norfolk	1140	1177	New creation
Earl of Cornwall (1141)	Reginald de Dunstanville, 1st Earl of Cornwall	1141	1175	New creation
Earl of Devon (1141)	Baldwin de Redvers, 1st Earl of Devon	1141	1155	New creation
Earl of Hereford (1141)	Miles de Gloucester, 1st Earl of Hereford	1141	1143	New creation; Died
Earl of Hereford (1141)	Roger Fitzmiles, 2nd Earl of Hereford	1143	1155	
Earl of Kent (1141)	William de Ypres, 1st Earl of Kent	1141	1155	New creation
Earl of Lincoln (1141)	William de Roumare, 1st Earl of Lincoln	1141	1155	New creation
Earl of Oxford (1142)	Aubrey de Vere, 1st Earl of Oxford	1142	1194	New creation
Earl of Salisbury (1145)	Patrick of Salisbury, 1st Earl of Salisbury	1145	1168	New creation
Earl of Lincoln (1147)	Gilbert de Gant, Earl of Lincoln	1147	1156	New creation

== Peerage of Scotland ==
Title	Holder	Date gained	Date lost	Notes
Earl of Mar (1114)	Ruadrí, Earl of Mar	1115	Abt. 1140	Died
Earl of Mar (1114)	Morggán, Earl of Mar	Abt. 1140	Abt. 1178	
Earl of Dunbar (1115)	Gospatric III, Earl of Dunbar	1138	1166	
Earl of Angus (1115)	Gille Brigte, Earl of Angus	1135	1187	
Earl of Atholl (1115)	Máel Muire, Earl of Atholl	1115	Abt 1150	
Earl of Buchan (1115)	Colbán, Earl of Buchan	Abt. 1135	Abt. 1180	
Earl of Strathearn (1115)	Máel Ísu I, Earl of Strathearn	1115	Abt. 1140	Died
Earl of Strathearn (1115)	Ferchar, Earl of Strathearn	Abt. 1140	1171	
Earl of Fife (1129)	Donnchad I, Earl of Fife	1139	1154	

Preceded by List of peers 1130–1139	Lists of peers by decade 1140–1149	Succeeded by List of peers 1150–1159
