= List of peers 1120–1129 =

This page lists all peers who held extant titles between 1120 and 1129.

== Peerage of England ==
Title	Holder	Date gained	Date lost	Notes
Earl of Chester (1071)	Richard d'Avranches, 2nd Earl of Chester	1101	1120	Died; Title extinct
Earl of Northampton (1080)	Simon Saint-Lis, 2nd Earl of Northampton	1109	1153	
Earl of Albemarle (1081)	Stephen de Blois, 2nd Earl of Albemarle	1090	1127	Died; Title extinct
Earl of Surrey (1088)	William de Warenne, 2nd Earl of Surrey	1099	1138	
Earl of Warwick (1088)	Roger de Beaumont, 2nd Earl of Warwick	1119	1153	
Earl of Buckingham (1097)	Walter Giffard, 2nd Earl of Buckingham	1102	1164	
Earl of Leicester (1107)	Robert de Beaumont, 2nd Earl of Leicester	1118	1168	
Earl of Chester (1121)	Ranulph le Meschin, 1st Earl of Chester	1121	1129	New creation; Died
Earl of Chester (1121)	Ranulph de Gernon, 2nd Earl of Chester	1129	1153	
Earl of Gloucester (1121)	Robert, 1st Earl of Gloucester	1121	1147	New creation

== Peerage of Scotland ==
Title	Holder	Date gained	Date lost	Notes
Earl of Mar (1114)	Ruadrí, Earl of Mar	1115	Abt. 1140	
Earl of Dunbar (1115)	Gospatric II, Earl of Dunbar	1115	1138	
Earl of Angus (1115)	Dufugan, Earl of Angus	1115	1135	
Earl of Atholl (1115)	Máel Muire, Earl of Atholl	1115	Abt. 1150	
Earl of Buchan (1115)	Gartnait, Earl of Buchan	1115	Abt. 1135	
Earl of Fife (1115)	Beth, Earl of Fife	1115	1120	Died
Earl of Strathearn (1115)	Máel Ísu I, Earl of Strathearn	1115	Abt. 1140	
Earl of Fife (1120)	Causantín, Earl of Fife	1120	1128	Died
Earl of Fife (1129)	Gille Míchéil, Earl of Fife	1129	1139	

Preceded by List of peers 1110–1119	Lists of peers by decade 1120–1129	Succeeded by List of peers 1130–1139
