= List of peers 1150–1159 =

This page lists all peers who held extant titles between 1150 and 1159.

== Peerage of England ==
| Title | Holder | Date gained | Date lost | Notes |
|---|---|---|---|---|
| Earl of Northampton (1080) | Simon Saint-Lis, 2nd Earl of Northampton | 1109 | 1153 | Died |
| Earl of Northampton (1080) | Simon Saint-Lis, 3rd Earl of Northampton | 1153 | 1184 | |
| Earl of Surrey (1088) | Isabel de Warenne, 4th Countess of Surrey | 1148 | 1199 | |
| Earl of Warwick (1088) | Roger de Beaumont, 2nd Earl of Warwick | 1119 | 1153 | Died |
| Earl of Warwick (1088) | William de Beaumont, 3rd Earl of Warwick | 1153 | 1184 | |
| Earl of Buckingham (1097) | Walter Giffard, 2nd Earl of Buckingham | 1102 | 1164 | |
| Earl of Devon (1141) | Baldwin de Redvers, 1st Earl of Devon | 1107 | 1155 | Died |
| Earl of Devon (1141) | Richard de Redvers, 2nd Earl of Devon | 1155 | 1162 | |
| Earl of Leicester (1107) | Robert de Beaumont, 2nd Earl of Leicester | 1118 | 1168 | |
| Earl of Chester (1121) | Ranulph de Gernon, 2nd Earl of Chester | 1129 | 1153 | Died |
| Earl of Chester (1121) | Hugh de Kevelioc, 3rd Earl of Chester | 1153 | 1181 | |
| Earl of Gloucester (1121) | William Fitzrobert, 2nd Earl of Gloucester | 1147 | 1183 | |
| Earl of Hertford (1135) | Gilbert de Clare, 2nd Earl of Hertford | 1136 | 1151 | Died |
| Earl of Hertford (1135) | Roger de Clare, 3rd Earl of Hertford | 1151 | 1173 | |
| Earl of Richmond (1136) | Conan IV, Duke of Brittany | 1146 | 1171 | |
| Earl of Arundel (1138) | William d'Aubigny, 1st Earl of Arundel | 1138 | 1176 | |
| Earl of Derby (1138) | Robert de Ferrers, 2nd Earl of Derby | 1139 | 1162 | |
| Earl of Pembroke (1138) | Richard de Clare, 2nd Earl of Pembroke | 1147 | 1176 | |
| Earl of Essex (1139) | Geoffrey de Mandeville, 2nd Earl of Essex | 1144 | 1160 | |
| Earl of Norfolk (1140) | Hugh Bigod, 1st Earl of Norfolk | 1140 | 1177 | |
| Earl of Cornwall (1141) | Reginald de Dunstanville, 1st Earl of Cornwall | 1141 | 1175 | |
| Earl of Hereford (1141) | Roger Fitzmiles, 2nd Earl of Hereford | 1143 | 1155 | Died |
| Earl of Kent (1141) | William de Ipres, 1st Earl of Kent | 1141 | 1155 | Deprived |
| Earl of Lincoln (1141) | William de Roumare, 1st Earl of Lincoln | 1141 | 1155 | Died |
| Earl of Oxford (1142) | Aubrey de Vere, 1st Earl of Oxford | 1142 | 1194 | |
| Earl of Salisbury (1145) | Patrick of Salisbury, 1st Earl of Salisbury | 1145 | 1168 | |
| Earl of Lincoln (1147) | Gilbert de Gant, Earl of Lincoln | 1147 | 1156 | Died |

== Peerage of Scotland ==
| Title | Holder | Date gained | Date lost | Notes |
|---|---|---|---|---|
| Earl of Mar (1114) | Morggán, Earl of Mar | Abt. 1140 | Abt. 1178 | |
| Earl of Dunbar (1115) | Gospatric III, Earl of Dunbar | 1138 | 1166 | |
| Earl of Angus (1115) | Gille Brigte, Earl of Angus | 1135 | 1187 | |
| Earl of Atholl (1115) | Máel Muire, Earl of Atholl | 1115 | Abt 1150 | Died |
| Earl of Atholl (1115) | Máel Coluim, Earl of Atholl | Abt 1150 | Abt 1190 | |
| Earl of Buchan (1115) | Colbán, Earl of Buchan | Abt. 1135 | Abt. 1180 | |
| Earl of Strathearn (1115) | Ferchar, Earl of Strathearn | Abt. 1140 | 1171 | |
| Earl of Fife (1129) | Donnchad I, Earl of Fife | 1139 | 1154 | Died |
| Earl of Fife (1129) | Donnchad II, Earl of Fife | 1154 | 1203 | |
| Earl of Ross (1157) | Malcolm MacHeth, Earl of Ross | 1157 | 1168 | |

| Preceded by List of peers 1140–1149 | Lists of peers by decade 1150–1159 | Succeeded by List of peers 1160–1169 |
