= List of peers 1130–1139 =

This page lists all peers who held extant titles between 1130 and 1139.

== Peerage of England ==
Title	Holder	Date gained	Date lost	Notes
Earl of Northampton (1080)	Simon II de Senlis, Earl of Huntingdon-Northampton	1109	1153	
Earl of Surrey (1088)	William de Warenne, 2nd Earl of Surrey	1099	1138	Died
Earl of Surrey (1088)	William de Warenne, 3rd Earl of Surrey	1138	1148	
Earl of Warwick (1088)	Roger de Beaumont, 2nd Earl of Warwick	1119	1153	
Earl of Buckingham (1097)	Walter Giffard, 2nd Earl of Buckingham	1102	1164	
Earl of Leicester (1107)	Robert de Beaumont, 2nd Earl of Leicester	1118	1168	
Earl of Chester (1121)	Ranulf de Gernon, 4th Earl of Chester	1129	1153	
Earl of Gloucester (1121)	Robert, 1st Earl of Gloucester	1121	1147	
Earl of Hertford (1135)	Richard Fitz Gilbert de Clare	1135	1136	New creation; Died
Earl of Hertford (1135)	Gilbert de Clare, 1st Earl of Hertford	1136	1151	
Earl of Richmond (1136)	Alan de Bretagne, 1st Earl of Richmond	1136	1146	New creation
Earl of Arundel (1138)	William d'Aubigny, 1st Earl of Arundel	1138	1176	New creation
Earl of Bedford (1138)	Hugh de Beaumont, 1st Earl of Bedford	1138	1142	New creation
Earl of Derby (1138)	Robert de Ferrers, 1st Earl of Derby	1138	1139	New creation; Died
Earl of Derby (1138)	Robert de Ferrers, 2nd Earl of Derby	1139	1162	
Earl of Pembroke (1138)	Gilbert de Clare, 1st Earl of Pembroke	1138	1147	New creation
Earl of Worcester (1138)	Waleran de Beaumont, 1st Earl of Worcester	1138	1145	New creation
Earl of Essex (1139)	Geoffrey de Mandeville, 1st Earl of Essex	1139	1144	New creation

== Peerage of Scotland ==
Title	Holder	Date gained	Date lost	Notes
Earl of Mar (1114)	Ruadrí, Earl of Mar	1115	Abt. 1140	
Earl of Dunbar (1115)	Gospatric II, Earl of Dunbar	1115	1138	Died
Earl of Dunbar (1115)	Gospatric III, Earl of Dunbar	1138	1166	
Earl of Angus (1115)	Dufugan, Earl of Angus	1115	1135	Died
Earl of Angus (1115)	Gille Brigte, Earl of Angus	1135	1187	
Earl of Atholl (1115)	Máel Muire, Earl of Atholl	1115	Abt 1150	
Earl of Buchan (1115)	Gartnait, Earl of Buchan	1115	Abt. 1135	Died
Earl of Buchan (1115)	Colbán, Earl of Buchan	Abt. 1135	Abt. 1180	
Earl of Strathearn (1115)	Máel Ísu I, Earl of Strathearn	1115	Abt. 1140	
Earl of Fife (1129)	Gille Míchéil, Earl of Fife	1129	1139	Died
Earl of Fife (1129)	Donnchad I, Earl of Fife	1139	1154	
