= Walter Giffard (disambiguation) =

Walter Giffard (c.1225–1279), was the Chancellor of England and archbishop of York.

Walter Giffard may also refer to:

- Walter Giffard, Lord of Longueville (died 1084), Norman baron and Christian knight
- Walter Giffard, 1st Earl of Buckingham (died 1102), Anglo-Norman magnate, son of the previous
- Walter Giffard, 2nd Earl of Buckingham (died 1164), English peer, son of the previous
- Walter Giffard (Oxford), English medieval theologist and university administrator
- Walter M. Giffard (1856–1929), Hawaiian diplomat
