= List of peers 1110–1119 =

This page lists all peers who held extant titles between 1110 and 1119.

== Peerage of England ==
Title	Holder	Date gained	Date lost	Notes
Earl of Chester (1071)	Richard d'Avranches, 2nd Earl of Chester	1101	1120	
Earl of Northampton (1080)	Simon II de Senlis, Earl of Huntingdon-Northampton	1109	1153	
Earl of Albemarle (1081)	Stephen de Blois, 2nd Earl of Albemarle	1090	1127	
Earl of Surrey (1088)	William de Warenne, 2nd Earl of Surrey	1099	1138	
Earl of Warwick (1088)	Henry de Beaumont, 1st Earl of Warwick	1088	1119	Died
Earl of Warwick (1088)	Roger de Beaumont, 2nd Earl of Warwick	1119	1153	
Earl of Buckingham (1097)	Walter Giffard, 2nd Earl of Buckingham	1102	1164	
Earl of Leicester (1107)	Robert de Beaumont, 1st Earl of Leicester	1107	1118	Died
Earl of Leicester (1107)	Robert de Beaumont, 2nd Earl of Leicester	1118	1168	

== Peerage of Scotland ==
Title	Holder	Date gained	Date lost	Notes
Earl of Mar (1114)	Ruadrí, Earl of Mar	1114	Abt. 1140	
Earl of Dunbar (1115)	Gospatric II, Earl of Dunbar	1115	1138	
Earl of Angus (1115)	Dufugan, Earl of Angus	1115	1135	
Earl of Atholl (1115)	Máel Muire, Earl of Atholl	1115	Abt. 1150	
Earl of Buchan (1115)	Gartnait, Earl of Buchan	1115	Abt. 1135	
Earl of Fife (1115)	Beth, Earl of Fife	1115	1120	
Earl of Strathearn (1115)	Máel Ísu I, Earl of Strathearn	1115	Abt. 1140	

Preceded by List of peers 1100–1109	Lists of peers by decade 1110–1119	Succeeded by List of peers 1120–1129
