= List of peers 1170–1179 =

This page lists all peers who held extant titles between 1170 and 1179.

== Peerage of England ==
Title	Holder	Date gained	Date lost	Notes
Earl of Northampton (1080)	Simon Saint-Lis, 3rd Earl of Northampton	1153	1184	
Earl of Surrey (1088)	Isabel de Warenne, 4th Countess of Surrey	1148	1199	
Earl of Warwick (1088)	William de Beaumont, 3rd Earl of Warwick	1153	1184	
Earl of Devon (1141)	Baldwin de Redvers, 3rd Earl of Devon	1162	1188	
Earl of Leicester (1107)	Robert de Beaumont, 3rd Earl of Leicester	1168	1190	
Earl of Chester (1121)	Hugh de Kevelioc, 3rd Earl of Chester	1153	1181	
Earl of Gloucester (1121)	William Fitzrobert, 2nd Earl of Gloucester	1147	1183	
Earl of Hertford (1135)	Roger de Clare, 3rd Earl of Hertford	1151	1173	Died
Earl of Hertford (1135)	Richard de Clare, 4th Earl of Hertford	1173	1217	
Earl of Richmond (1136)	Conan IV, Duke of Brittany	1146	1171	Died
Earl of Richmond (1136)	Constance of Brittany	1171	1201	
Earl of Arundel (1138)	William d'Aubigny, 1st Earl of Arundel	1138	1176	Died
Earl of Arundel (1138)	William d'Aubigny, 2nd Earl of Arundel	1176	1193	
Earl of Derby (1138)	William de Ferrers, 3rd Earl of Derby	1162	1190	
Earl of Pembroke (1138)	Richard de Clare, 2nd Earl of Pembroke	1147	1176	Died
Earl of Pembroke (1138)	Gilbert de Strigul, 3rd Earl of Pembroke	1176	1185	
Earl of Essex (1139)	William de Mandeville, 3rd Earl of Essex	1160	1189	
Earl of Norfolk (1140)	Hugh Bigod, 1st Earl of Norfolk	1140	1177	Died
Earl of Norfolk (1140)	Roger Bigod, 2nd Earl of Norfolk	1177	1221	
Earl of Cornwall (1141)	Reginald de Dunstanville, 1st Earl of Cornwall	1141	1175	Died
Earl of Oxford (1142)	Aubrey de Vere, 1st Earl of Oxford	1142	1194	
Earl of Salisbury (1145)	William of Salisbury, 2nd Earl of Salisbury	1168	1196	
Earl of Buckingham (1164)	Richard de Clare, 2nd Earl of Pembroke	1164	1176	Died

== Peerage of Scotland ==
Title	Holder	Date gained	Date lost	Notes
Earl of Mar (1114)	Morggán, Earl of Mar	Abt. 1140	Abt. 1178	Died
Earl of Mar (1114)	Gille Críst, Earl of Mar	Abt. 1178	Abt. 1220	
Earl of Dunbar (1115)	Waltheof, Earl of Dunbar	1166	1182	
Earl of Angus (1115)	Gille Brigte, Earl of Angus	1135	1187	
Earl of Atholl (1115)	Máel Coluim, Earl of Atholl	Abt 1150	Abt 1190	
Earl of Buchan (1115)	Colbán, Earl of Buchan	Abt. 1135	Abt. 1180	
Earl of Strathearn (1115)	Ferchar, Earl of Strathearn	Abt. 1140	1171	Died
Earl of Strathearn (1115)	Gille Brigte, Earl of Strathearn	1171	1223	
Earl of Fife (1129)	Donnchad II, Earl of Fife	1154	1203	
Earl of Menteith (1160)	Gille Críst, Earl of Menteith	Abt. 1160	Abt. 1190	

== Peerage of Ireland ==
Title	Holder	Date gained	Date lost	Notes
Baron Athenry (1172)	Robert de Bermingham	1172	1218	New creation

Preceded by List of peers 1160–1169	Lists of peers by decade 1170–1179	Succeeded by List of peers 1180–1189
