= List of peers 1180–1189 =

This page lists all peers who held extant titles between 1180 and 1189.

== Peerage of England ==
Title	Holder	Date gained	Date lost	Notes
Earl of Northampton (1080)	Simon III de Senlis	1153	1184	Died
Earl of Surrey (1088)	Isabel de Warenne, 4th Countess of Surrey	1148	1199	
Earl of Warwick (1088)	William de Beaumont, 3rd Earl of Warwick	1153	1184	Died
Earl of Warwick (1088)	Waleran de Beaumont, 4th Earl of Warwick	1184	1203	
Earl of Devon (1141)	Baldwin de Redvers, 3rd Earl of Devon	1162	1188	Died
Earl of Devon (1141)	Richard de Redvers, 4th Earl of Devon	1188	1193	
Earl of Leicester (1107)	Robert de Beaumont, 3rd Earl of Leicester	1168	1190	
Earl of Chester (1121)	Hugh de Kevelioc, 3rd Earl of Chester	1153	1181	Died
Earl of Chester (1121)	Randolph de Blondeville, 4th Earl of Chester	1181	1232	
Earl of Gloucester (1121)	William Fitzrobert, 2nd Earl of Gloucester	1147	1183	Died
Earl of Hertford (1135)	Richard de Clare, 4th Earl of Hertford	1173	1217	
Earl of Richmond (1136)	Constance of Brittany	1171	1201	
Earl of Arundel (1138)	William d'Aubigny, 2nd Earl of Arundel	1176	1193	
Earl of Derby (1138)	William de Ferrers, 3rd Earl of Derby	1162	1190	
Earl of Pembroke (1138)	Gilbert de Strigul, 3rd Earl of Pembroke	1176	1185	Died
Earl of Essex (1139)	William de Mandeville, 3rd Earl of Essex	1160	1189	Died
Earl of Norfolk (1140)	Roger Bigod, 2nd Earl of Norfolk	1177	1221	
Earl of Oxford (1142)	Aubrey de Vere, 1st Earl of Oxford	1142	1194	
Earl of Salisbury (1145)	William of Salisbury, 2nd Earl of Salisbury	1168	1196	
Earl of Cornwall (1180)	Baldwin, 1st Earl of Cornwall	1180	1188	New creation; Died
Earl of Gloucester (1186)	Isabel, Countess of Gloucester	1186	1189	New creation; assumed by husband
Earl of Gloucester (1186)	John of England	1189	1199	also Earl of Cornwall
Earl of Cornwall (1189)	John of England	1189	1199	New creation
Earl of Pembroke (1189)	William Marshal, 1st Earl of Pembroke	1189	1219	New creation

== Peerage of Scotland ==
Title	Holder	Date gained	Date lost	Notes
Earl of Mar (1114)	Gille Críst, Earl of Mar	Abt. 1178	Abt. 1220	
Earl of Dunbar (1115)	Waltheof, Earl of Dunbar	1166	1182	Died
Earl of Dunbar (1115)	Patrick I, Earl of Dunbar	1182	1232	
Earl of Angus (1115)	Gille Brigte, Earl of Angus	1135	1187	Died
Earl of Angus (1115)	Adam, Earl of Angus	1187	1197	
Earl of Atholl (1115)	Máel Coluim, Earl of Atholl	Abt 1150	Abt 1190	
Earl of Buchan (1115)	Colbán, Earl of Buchan	Abt. 1135	Abt. 1180	Died
Earl of Buchan (1115)	Roger, Earl of Buchan	Abt. 1180	Abt. 1190	
Earl of Strathearn (1115)	Gille Brigte, Earl of Strathearn	1171	1223	
Earl of Fife (1129)	Donnchad II, Earl of Fife	1154	1203	
Earl of Menteith (1160)	Gille Críst, Earl of Menteith	Abt. 1160	Abt. 1190	
Earl of Lennox (1184)	Ailín I, Earl of Lennox	1184	1220	New creation
Earl of Carrick (1184)	Donnchadh, Earl of Carrick	1186	1250	New creation

== Peerage of Ireland ==
Title	Holder	Date gained	Date lost	Notes
Baron Athenry (1172)	Robert de Bermingham	1172	1218	

Preceded by List of peers 1170–1179	Lists of peers by decade 1180–1189	Succeeded by List of peers 1190–1199
