= List of peers 1100–1109 =

This page lists all peers who held extant titles between 1100 and 1109.

== Peerage of England ==
Title	Holder	Date gained	Date lost	Notes
Earl of Cornwall (1068)	William Fitz-Robert, 2nd Earl of Cornwall	1095	1106	Forfeit
Earl of Chester (1071)	Hugh d'Avranches, 1st Earl of Chester	1071	1101	Died
	Richard d'Avranches, 2nd Earl of Chester	1101	1120	
Earl of Shrewsbury (1074)	Robert of Bellême, 3rd Earl of Shrewsbury	1098	1102	Forfeit
Earl of Northampton (1080)	Simon I de Senlis, Earl of Huntingdon-Northampton	1080	1109	Died
	Simon II de Senlis, Earl of Huntingdon-Northampton	1109	1153	
Earl of Albemarle (1081)	Stephen de Blois, 2nd Earl of Albemarle	1090	1127	
Earl of Surrey (1088)	William de Warenne, 2nd Earl of Surrey	1099	1138	
Earl of Warwick (1088)	Henry de Beaumont, 1st Earl of Warwick	1088	1119	
Earl of Buckingham (1097)	Walter Giffard, 1st Earl of Buckingham	1097	1102	Died
	Walter Giffard, 2nd Earl of Buckingham	1102	1164	
Earl of Leicester (1107)	Robert de Beaumont, 1st Earl of Leicester	1107	1118	New creation

Preceded by List of peers 1090–1099	Lists of peers by decade 1100–1109	Succeeded by List of peers 1110–1119
