= List of peers 1090–1099 =

This page lists all peers who held extant titles between 1090 and 1099.

== Peerage of England ==
Title	Holder	Date gained	Date lost	Notes
Earl of Cornwall (1068)	Robert, Count of Mortain	1068	1095	Died
Earl of Cornwall (1068)	William Fitz-Robert, 2nd Earl of Cornwall	1095	1106	
Earl of Dorset (1070)	Osmund, Count of Seez	1070	1099	Died
Earl of Chester (1071)	Hugh d'Avranches, 1st Earl of Chester	1071	1101	
Earl of Shrewsbury (1074)	Roger de Montgomerie, 1st Earl of Shrewsbury	1074	1094	Died
Earl of Shrewsbury (1074)	Hugh of Montgomery, 2nd Earl of Shrewsbury	1094	1098	Died
Earl of Shrewsbury (1074)	Robert of Bellême, 3rd Earl of Shrewsbury	1098	1102	
Earl of Northampton (1080)	Simon I de Senlis, Earl of Huntingdon-Northampton	1080	1109	
Earl of Albemarle (1081)	Adelaide, 1st Countess of Albemarle	1081	1090	Died
Earl of Albemarle (1081)	Stephen de Blois, 2nd Earl of Albemarle	1090	1127	
Earl of Surrey (1088)	William de Warenne, 1st Earl of Surrey	1088	1099	Died
Earl of Surrey (1088)	William de Warenne, 2nd Earl of Surrey	1099	1138	
Earl of Warwick (1088)	Henry de Beaumont, 1st Earl of Warwick	1088	1119	
Earl of Gloucester (1093)	William Fitzeustace, 1st Earl of Gloucester	1093	1094	New creation; Died
Earl of Buckingham (1097)	Walter Giffard, 1st Earl of Buckingham	1097	1102	New creation

== Peerage of Scotland ==
Title	Holder	Date gained	Date lost	Notes
Mormaer of Fife	Causantín, Earl of Fife	c. 1095	1128	
Mormaer of Mearns	Máel Petair of Mearns			fl. 1094

Preceded by List of peers 1080–1089	Lists of peers by decade 1090–1099	Succeeded by List of peers 1100–1109
