= Walter M. Giffard =

Hawaiian diplomat

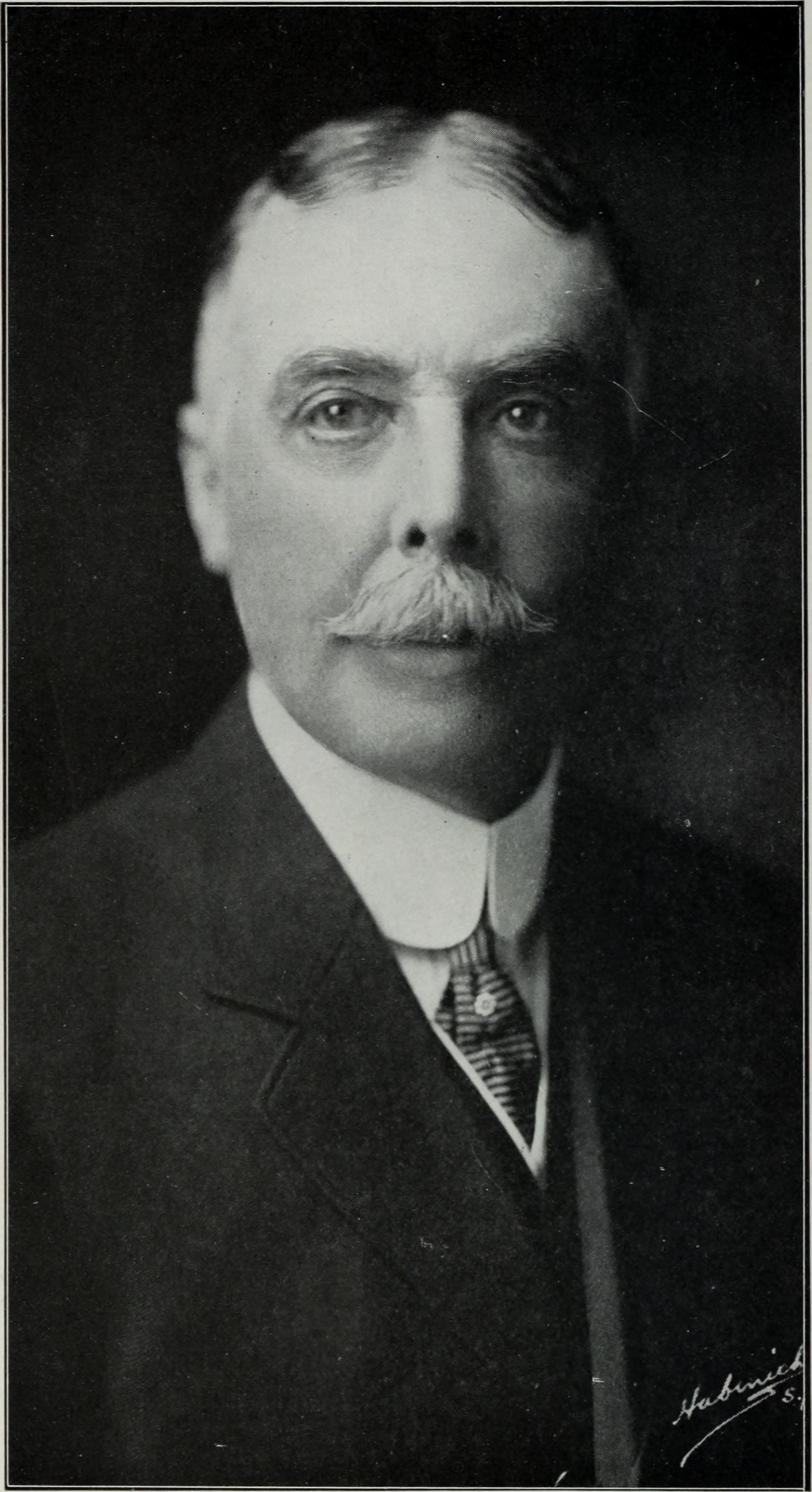
- Born: May 27, 1856; Jersey
- Died: September 30, 1929 (aged 73); Honolulu, Territory of Hawaii
- Occupations: Business man Diplomat; Horticulturist
- Spouse: Martha Petre Brickwood
- Children: 3

Walter Le Montais Giffard (May 27, 1856 – June 30, 1929) was a Hawaiian diplomat and a member of Liliʻuokalani's Privy Council of State. He was born in Jersey and moved to Hawaii at a young age, working his way up through the W. G. Irwin & Co., Ltd organization to partnership and trustee. Giffard was one of the consulting landscape architects for the grounds of the Royal Hawaiian Hotel in Waikiki. He was influential in the agricultural quarantine to protect Hawaii's sugar cane fields, and helped introduce the Yellow Caledonia cane to the growers.

== Early life ==
He was born May 27, 1856, in Jersey and relocated to Hawaii in 1875 where he was employed as a clerk by Honolulu merchant John T. Waterhouse. About a year later, he began working for W. G. Irwin & Co., Ltd as a bookkeeper, and by 1890 was secretary and treasurer. Irwin was then president and manager, with Claus Spreckels as vice president. Over the next several years, Giffard worked his way up in Irwin's company to become vice-president. He was a director and co-trustee with W. G. Irwin for all affiliated corporations under the Irwin umbrella.

== Government and civic service ==
His diplomatic service included Acting Chancellor of the French Legation in Hawaii for three years, Acting French Commissioner and Consul General for one year; Acting Commissioner and Consul General for Portugal in Hawaii for three months. He was appointed to Liliʻuokalani's Privy Council of State on August 25, 1891, but did not attend the council meetings, so as to avoid the appearance of conflict of interest with his diplomatic obligations.

In 1896, the legislature of the Republic of Hawaii authorized an increase in postal rates for 1897, and ordered that all existing unused postage in the old denominations to be destroyed. Giffard was appointed to the Committee to Destroy Postage Stamps, Postcards and Stamped Envelopes, that oversaw the destruction. It was estimated that over $100,000 (Hawaiian dollars) worth of the old postage (in denominations from 3¢ to $1) was incinerated.

Giffard was with the Honolulu Park Commission for eight years and three months, for the period January 12, 1904 through October 21, 1912. He served on the Board of Agriculture and Forestry in 1903, becoming its president for 1907. He continued as a member of the board up through 1923.

He was 1906–7 president of the Honolulu Chamber of Commerce, commissioner of Kapiolani Park, and secretary-treasurer of the Kapiolani Park Association.

== Horticulture and forestry ==
By 1903, the destructive cane leafhopper had invaded the sugarcane fields and threatened to eviscerate the industry. Giffard's interest in horticulture and forestry led to his being on the Board of Trustees of the Hawaiian Sugar Planters Association, as well twice chairman of Hawaiian Sugar Planters Experimental Station committee. Under his leadership, the Experimental Station was reorganized, and the destructive cane leafhopper was brought under control through the introduction of parasitoids. His efforts on behalf of the sugar industry were instrumental in importation of the Yellow Caledonia cane, a species with natural resistance to the cane leafhopper. He was a founding member president of the Hawaiian Entomological Society.

While serving as secretary and executive officer of the Board of Agriculture and Forestry in 1904, he was appointed to act in place of president Lorrin A. Thurston who was temporarily out of the territory.

California landscape architect R. T. Stevens counseled with Giffard on the design of the grounds landscaping of the modern-day Royal Hawaiian Hotel. Built by Castle & Cooke in 1925–1926, it replaced a Waikiki hotel of the same name that had been transferred to the federal government for use as the Army and Navy YMCA in 1917. The original Royal Hawaiian Hotel had been built by Robert Lewers in 1872, used as a home by King Kalākaua, and later managed by George MacFarlane.

== Personal life ==
He married Martha Petre Brickwood of Honolulu, June 30, 1881, with whom he had a daughter Jane and son Harold. His son Duboit was from a former marriage.

Giffard was a member the Pacific and Oahu Country Clubs, and of Hawaiian Lodge, No. 21, F. & A. M. Shriners,

He died June 30, 1929.

== Bibliography ==
- Siddall, John William. (1917). Men of Hawaii: being a biographical reference library, complete and authentic, of the men of note and substantial achievement in the Hawaiian Islands: volume 1. Honolulu Star-Bulletin.
- Dine, Delos Lewis Van (1911). "The Sugarcane leafhopper". The Sugar-cane Insects of Hawaii. 91–93. U.S. Government Printing Office.
