= Kalākaua coinage =

1883 Kingdom of Hawaii's silver coins

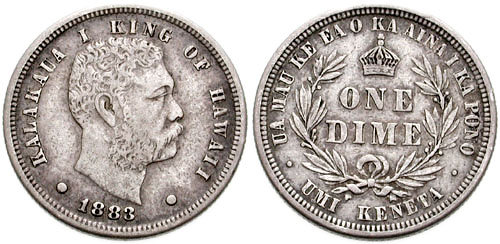
Kalākaua 1883 dime

The Kalākaua coinage is a set of silver coins of the Kingdom of Hawaii dated 1883, authorized to boost Hawaiian pride by giving the kingdom its own money. They were designed by Charles E. Barber, Chief Engraver of the United States Bureau of the Mint, and were struck at the San Francisco Mint. The issued coins are a dime (ten-cent piece), quarter dollar, half dollar, and dollar.

No immediate action had been taken after the 1880 act authorizing coins, but King Kalākaua was interested and government officials saw a way to get out of a financial bind by getting coins issued in exchange for government bonds. Businessman Claus Spreckels was willing to make the arrangements with the United States in exchange for profits from the coin production, and contracted with the US Mint to have $1,000,000 worth of coins struck. Originally, a 12 1/2 cent piece was planned and a few specimens were struck, but it was scrapped in an effort to have uniformity between US and Hawaiian coins, and a dime was substituted. The coins were struck at San Francisco in 1883 and 1884, though all bear the earlier date.

The coins met a hostile reception from the business community in Honolulu, who feared inflation of the currency in a time of recession. After legal maneuvering, the government agreed to use over half of the coinage as backing for paper currency, which continued until better economic times began in 1885. After that, the coins were more eagerly accepted in circulation. They remained in the flow of commerce on the islands until withdrawn in 1903, after Hawaii had become a US territory.

== Background ==
Native Hawaiians before the arrival of Captain Cook in 1770 used no coins; trade in their agricultural economy was based on barter. Early relations between Hawaiians and explorers were also based on barter, with nails, beads, and small pieces of iron sometimes being used as money, but as more systematic foreign trade began at the turn of the 19th century, coins of many lands came to the islands as payment for exports. The arrival of the missionaries, and the plantations and other commercial activity that soon followed, led to the first currencies generated by the islands: tokens and scrip used to pay workers because of the chronic shortage of small change. The trade ties and cultural connections with the United States led the early Hawaii business community to think in terms of the US dollar, and it became the basis for trade, with the Hawaiian royal government periodically publishing tables of the value of non-US coins in terms of the dollar. This was necessary because such coins, brought to the islands by foreign trade, circulated as a means of exchange alongside American silver and gold pieces.

In 1847, King Kamehameha III issued a one-cent coin, most likely struck by a firm in New England. It was unpopular with merchants, who preferred not to deal with such small amounts. Some were issued in change in government transactions, but only about 12,000 ever circulated. The failure caused the government to reconsider plans to issue more denominations of coins.

By 1883, most coins on the islands were American, due to the close economic integration between islands and mainland. The laws of Hawaii reflected this, making gold American coins legal tender for an unlimited amount and American silver coins legal tender to $50. In 1879, the kingdom issued its first currency notes, technically certificates of deposit, redeemable in silver coin and with denominations ranging from $10 to $500.

At that time in Hawaii, gold coins brought a premium over their face value if purchased with silver; only gold could be used for certain transactions, such as paying customs duties. Silver had been heavily imported into the kingdom in the 1870s despite government efforts to slow the flow with taxes, and thus gold was more expensive there in terms of silver than in the United States, which was more stable monetarily. Any large influx of silver into circulation, such as by the Kalākaua coins, meant that silver in the hands of the public might become worth less in terms of gold. In 1883, Hawaii was in a recession, due in part to a fall in sugar prices because of overproduction.

== Preparation ==
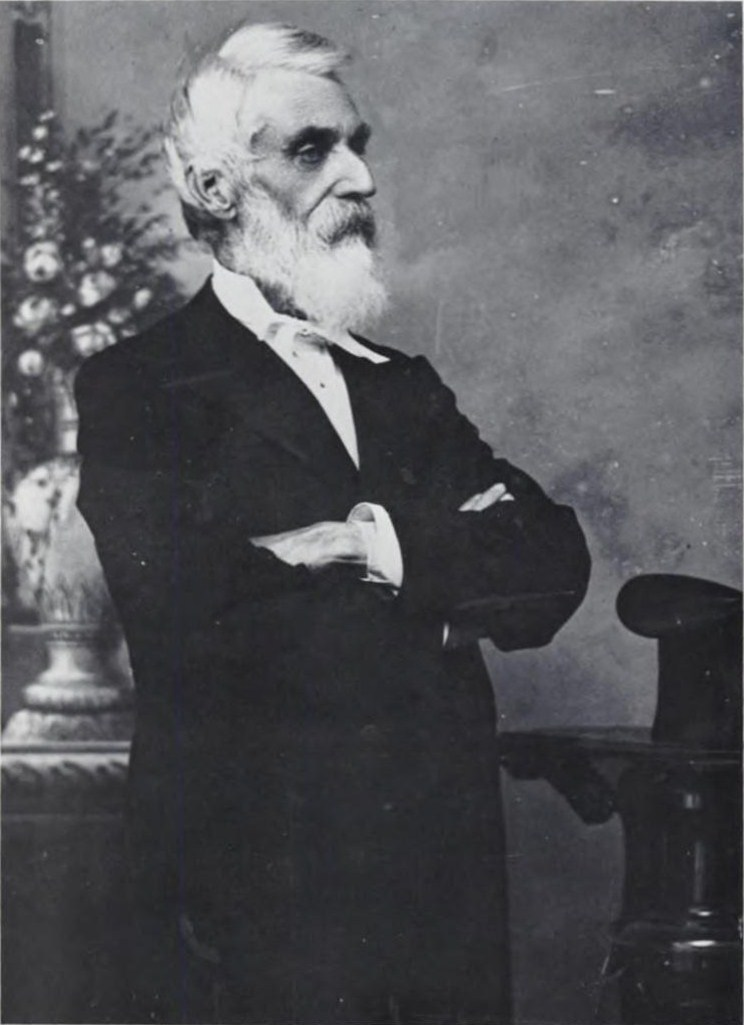
Walter M. Gibson

Finance chair Walter M. Gibson, supported by Minister of the Interior Samuel G. Wilder, pushed a new currency law through the 1880 legislature. It allowed the kingdom to purchase gold and silver bullion to be struck into new Hawaiian coins. Having the kingdom issue its own coins was one means by which the government hoped to improve Native Hawaiian morale, as their numbers and their influence had both been declining over the previous few decades. The king became more interested in coinage bearing his likeness during his world tour of 1881. During this journey, he was contacted by the owner of a New Caledonia nickel mining company hoping to use the metal in coinage, and sample five-cent pieces were sent to the king after his return to Honolulu. They found little favor, possibly because Hawaii's motto was misspelled. No action was taken until 1882, when the king appointed Gibson to lead the government. He moved forward with the coin idea; the currency was to have the king's image on the obverse side, and Hawaii's coat of arms and motto Ua Mau ke Ea o ka ʻĀina i ka Pono (The Life of the Land is Perpetuated in Righteousness) on the reverse. The 1880 law specified that the silver coins were to be in denominations of one dollar, fifty cents, twenty-five cents, and twelve and one-half cents. Twelve and one-half cents, or one bit (one Spanish colonial real) was sometimes the day's pay for a laborer.

A National Loan Act provided for $2 million in bonds, but due to its poor creditworthiness, the kingdom had been unable to sell them. Gibson hit upon the idea of combining the two acts by appointing businessman Claus Spreckels, a close friend of the king, as government agent to contract with the United States Mint to have coins struck there, and for Spreckels to be paid in government bonds. In March 1883, the cabinet council authorized Finance Minister John Mākini Kapena to make the arrangement with Spreckels, who received formal authority for this role in May. H.A.P. Carter, Hawaiian envoy in Washington, acted as intermediary between the Hawaiians and the US government, and wrote to Kapena in June that the US authorities regarded the agency arrangement as peculiar, since a more usual way of proceeding would have been for the Hawaiian government to contract directly, and to pay for the coins in cash.

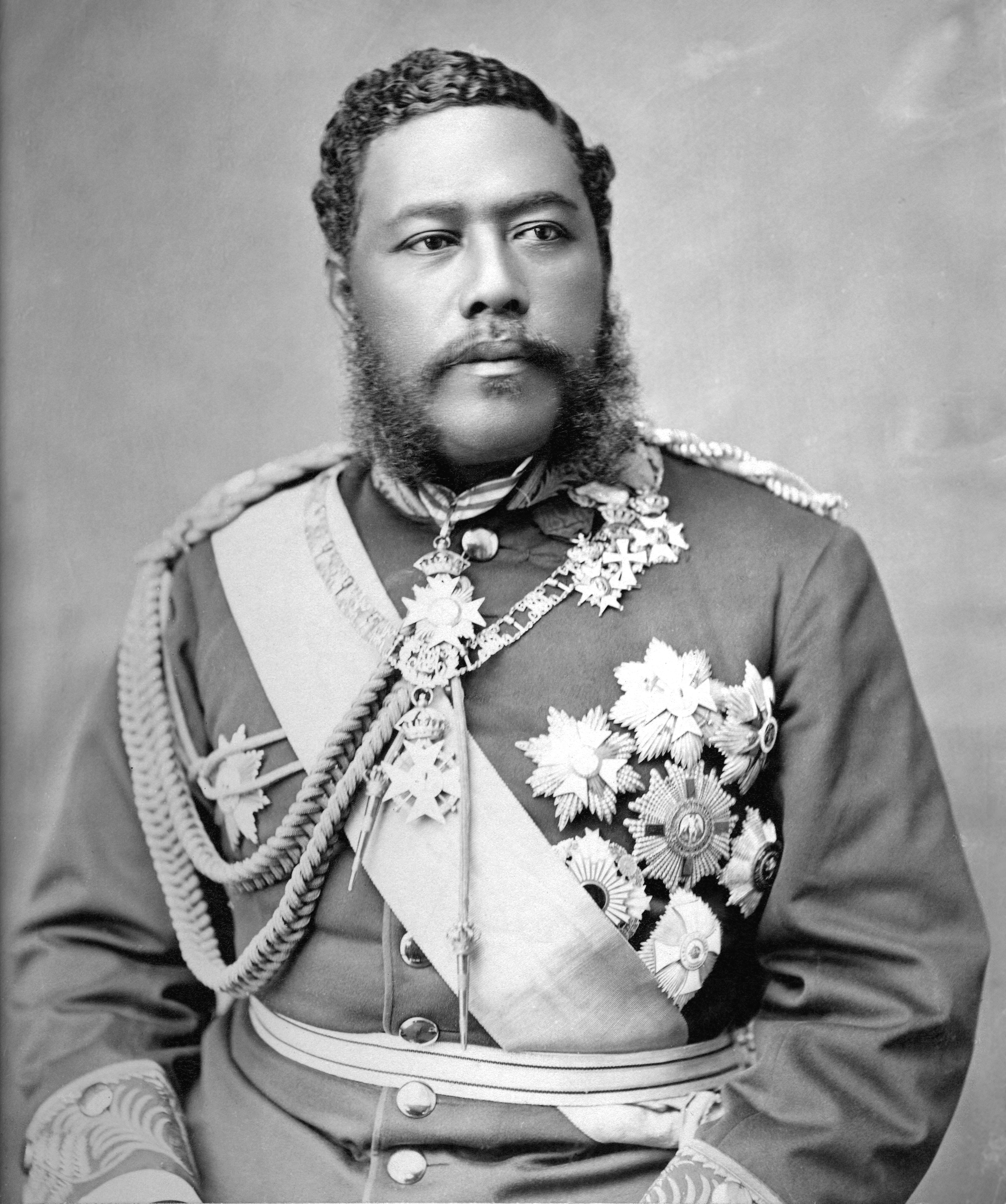
King Kalākaua

Spreckels was already in correspondence with American authorities; in January 1883, the Director of the United States Mint, Horatio Burchard, had written to him explaining the laws under which the Mint could strike coins for foreign governments, and that although the coins could be struck at the San Francisco Mint, the dies for the coinage would have to be prepared at Philadelphia. He asked for sketches from Spreckels, who provided an obverse showing a full-face portrait of the king; this was submitted to Chief Engraver Charles E. Barber in Philadelphia, who rejected it as impractical. Barber recommended the king be shown in profile, and a suitable photograph was sent to him for use in preparing models of the proposed coins. Once the Mint received Spreckels' commission as agent, Acting Director Robert E. Preston wrote noting that the authorization called for 12 1/2 cent pieces, but that the Hawaiian law had called for coins identical in size, weight, and fineness to US coins, and there was no such denomination struck by the US Mint. He asked if ten-cent pieces were desired instead, but no answer was immediately forthcoming, and Barber finished preliminary designs, including the 12 1/2 cent piece.

Barber finished hubs for the four coins in September 1883, and Philadelphia Mint Superintendent A. Loudon Snowden had two sets struck and sent to Preston in Washington. Snowden praised the beauty of the coins, and was happy that Barber had required less relief than needed on US coins of like value, since this meant the coins would be easier for the Mint to strike. Preston sent the coins to Spreckels in San Francisco, and authorized Philadelphia to make additional sets, both for its coin cabinet and for the director's office in Washington. Barber was instructed to make five sets of coining dies for each denomination, to be sent to the San Francisco Mint, with instructions that no coins were to be struck pending a final contract with Spreckels, and that the dies were to remain Hawaiian government property, to be turned over on request.

The formal contract was dated October 29, signed by Spreckels as agent for Hawaii, and by San Francisco Mint Superintendent E. F. Burton. It provided for $1,000,000 in coins: $500,000 in silver dollars, $300,000 in half dollars, $125,000 in quarter dollars and $75,000 in dimes. The Hawaiian government made the change from 12 1/2 cent pieces to dimes because it was negotiating a monetary convention with the United States and wanted its coins to conform to America's, though this convention never went into force. By mid-November the change had been noticed by the Mint, and Spreckels sent confirmation and a go-ahead to make dies for the dime, on the understanding that a revised authorization would be needed from Honolulu before production of dimes could begin. This was received in December. By this time, the kingdom's order was already in production, having started with a run of half dollars in November. Barber did not complete work on hubs for the dime until January 1884, and dies were not dispatched to San Francisco until February, though they are dated 1883. Once he had received the dies for the ten-cent coin, Burton sent the unneeded dies for the 12 1/2 cent piece to the director's office in Washington.

Spreckels supplied the bullion for the coins, at a cost of about $850,000. He paid $17,500 as the Mint's fee for striking the coins, $2,500 for designs, and $250 for dies. A final change reduced the total value in dimes to $25,000 (250,000 coins) while increasing the value in half dollars to $350,000 (700,000 coins).

== Design ==
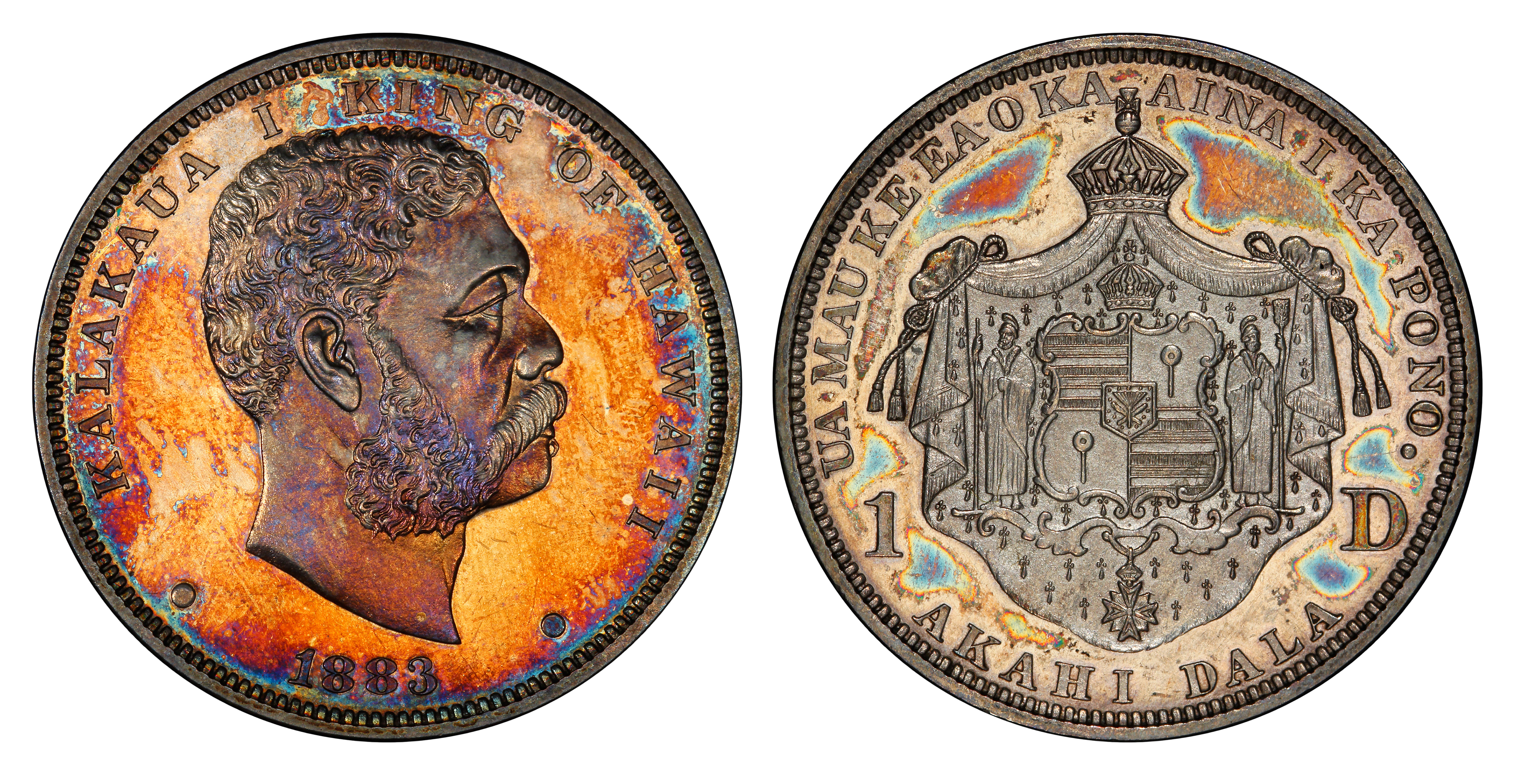
Kalākaua 1883 one-dollar coin

Both sides of each coin were designed by Charles E. Barber. The obverse displays a naked bust of Kalākaua. He is surrounded by his name and title; the date appears beneath. W. T. R. Marvin, writing in 1883 for the American Journal of Numismatics, said he had been told by those who had seen the coins that "the profile head of the King compares favorably with that of many rulers of much more important countries". Ernest Andrade, who chronicled the controversy caused by the coins, wrote that they bore Kalākaua's profile, "admittedly a handsome one".

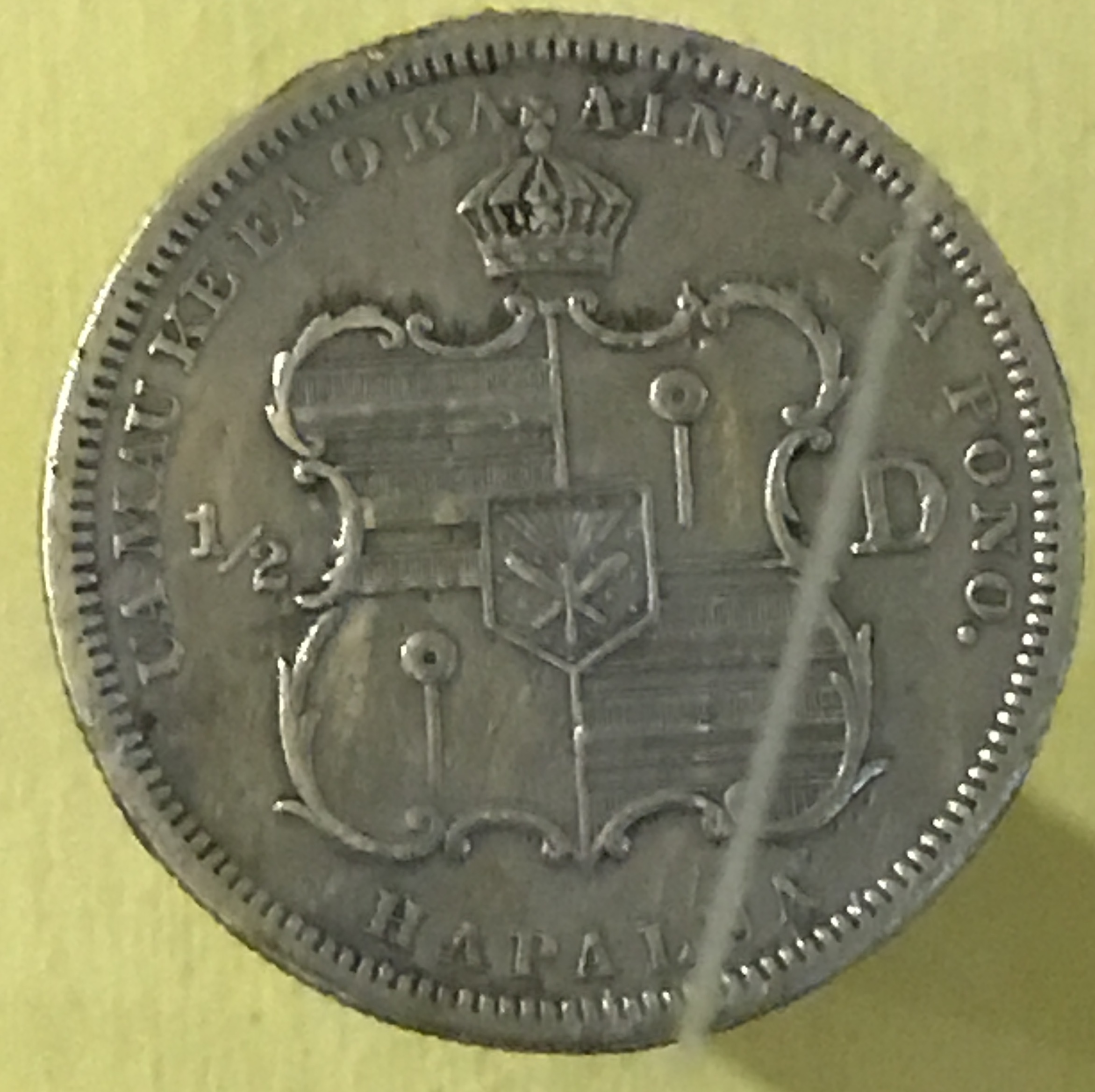
Half-dollar coin adapted as the seal of the Hawaiian consul in Suva, Fiji. In the Fiji Museum.

The dollar, half dollar and quarter dollar bear the royal arms, set forth most fully on the dollar, where the shield is emblazoned on a mantle, possibly ermine. Marvin suggested the famous feather cloak worn by Kamehameha the Great as a more appropriate choice than the fur to bear the arms. Below the shield on the dollar is suspended the Star of the Order of Kamehameha, and above it is the royal crown. Around the coin is Hawaii's motto, words spoken by Kamehameha following a time of distress. To either side is 1 and D.; below is the denomination of one dollar rendered in Hawaiian, AKAHI DALA. Dala became the Hawaiian term for dollar in missionary times as words changed to conform to the smaller Hawaiian alphabet. Dollar is rendered "dala" in speech in many parts of Asia and the Pacific.

The reverses of the half dollar and quarter dollar bear the arms without the mantle and order, encircled by the motto, with the denomination expressed respectively as HAPALUA meaning half dollar, and HAPAHA, quarter dollar. Each of the two coins pairs its fraction with the D., on either side of the shield. The 12 1/2 cent piece, known today only by a few proof pieces, bears a wreath with a crown separating its branches, and with the motto surrounding. The denomination is within the wreath, expressed as HAPAWALA. That design was adapted for the dime, with the denomination within the wreath expressed as UMI KENETA, and below the wreath ONE DIME, both meaning ten cents.

== Distribution and controversy ==
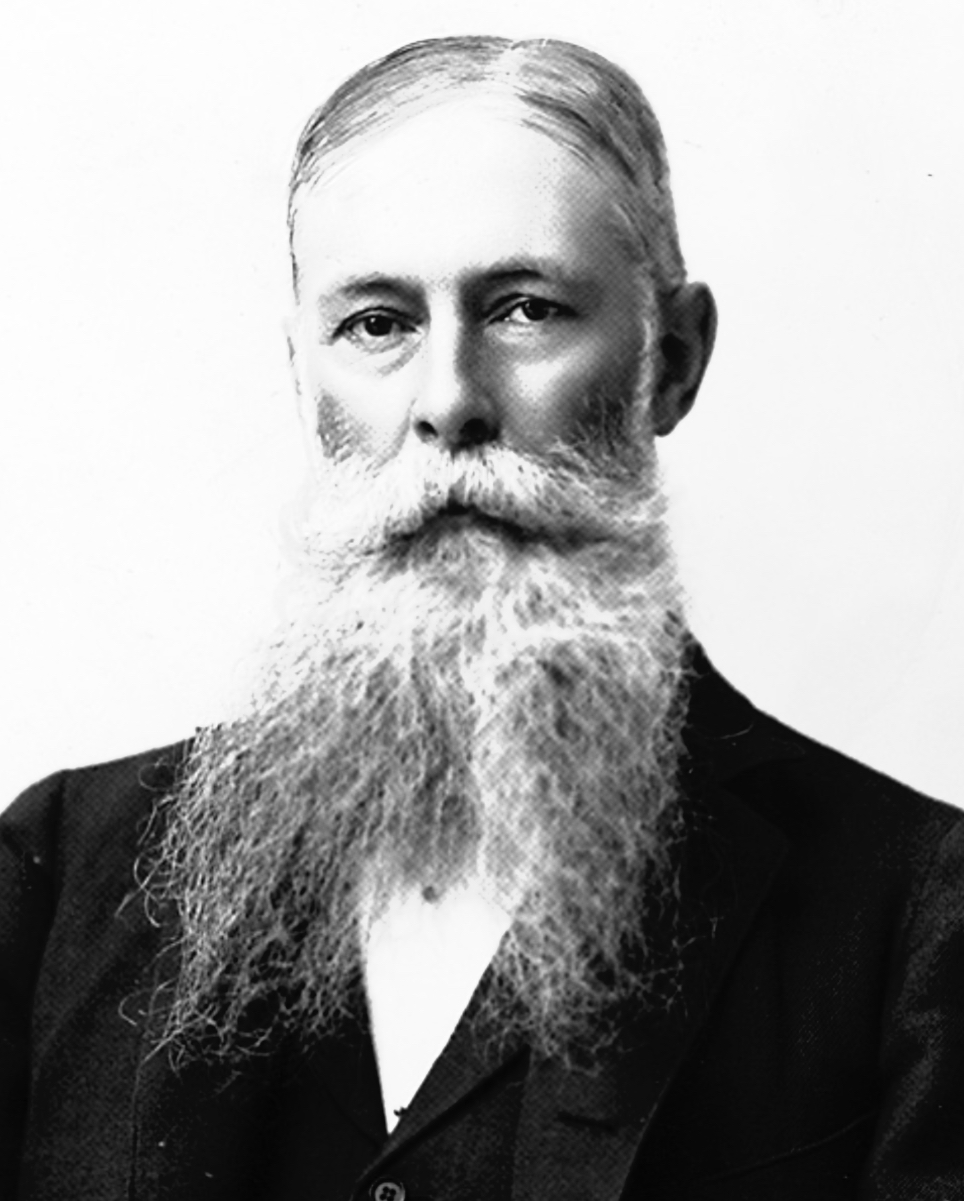
Sanford B. Dole

The first shipment of coins, $130,000 in half dollars, arrived by ship on December 9, 1883. Hawaii was still in an economic recession. Some members of the business community, including Sanford B. Dole, objected to the issue on the grounds that so much silver would inflate the currency, and went to court to prevent the government from giving Spreckels bonds in exchange for anything except gold coin, as the law required. The government opposed the action, which was brought in the islands' supreme court, on the grounds that the silver coins were equivalent to gold. The chief justice, A. F. Judd, granted a temporary writ of mandamus against the government giving the Dole plaintiffs what they wanted, finding that the coins were not equivalent to gold, and that the coinage and loan acts had been violated. On appeal to the full court, though, Judd was reversed, as the court found that Dole and his associates should have filed for an injunction. But when they did, the petition was denied. In the interim at a meeting chaired by the king, the privy council had declared the new coinage a legal tender; once the lawsuit was resolved, the government paid for a half million dollars in coins with a like amount of bonds.

Spreckels and his partners William G. Irwin and F. F. Low formed the Spreckels & Company Bank in Hawaii in 1884, for the specific purpose of circulating the silver coins. The first Hawaiian silver coin known to have been spent, a half dollar, was found among the receipts at the Honolulu Music Hall on January 10, 1884. It was placed in a pendant and given to the leading lady. The new coinage went into general circulation on January 14, with coins available at the Hawaiian Treasury and at Spreckels' new bank in Honolulu. There was considerable demand, and the coins (all of which were received by June 1884) displaced American quarter dollars and half dollars in circulation, something taken (depending on political position) to mean that they were accepted, or that Gresham's law (bad money drives out good) was in operation. The Hawaiian Treasury had almost run out of cash before receiving the coins, and they entered commerce as the government paid for goods and services, increasing the money supply and risking inflation. Within six months of issue, the coins traded against American currency at a discount of 2 1/2 percent.

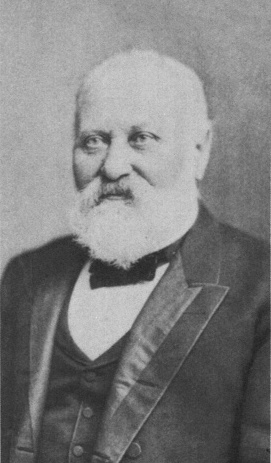
Claus Spreckels

Dole and his allies in the legislature used the coin issuance as a means of attacking the government, accusing Gibson and others of disobeying the laws, and demanding information on Spreckels's profits, which the government stated was about three percent after costs such as transport and insurance were calculated. The political fallout of the coinage was the 1884 election-year shift towards the Kuokoa (independent) Party in the legislature. The Currency Act of 1884, passed after the election, restricted acceptance of silver coin as payment to debts under $10, and limited the exchange of silver for gold at the treasury to $150,000 a month. The new silver coins were expected to flow into the Treasury in exchange for gold under this arrangement, but the government refused to implement the law until forced to by the Supreme Court. To avoid a financial panic, major private banks and businesses agreed to exchange gold for the new silver coins, in which there was little public confidence. But in February 1885, faced with a government refusal to pay out gold (of which the Treasury was almost bare), the private businesses stopped this arrangement. Negotiations followed, and the government reluctantly agreed to sequester more than $550,000 of the coins in a special account to back the banknotes then in circulation. Although this left the government with little liquidity, the increased confidence in its finances allowed it to borrow on a short-term basis. By mid-1885, sugar prices were rising, and prosperity was returning to the islands. Greater amounts of gold flowed into the islands, balancing the silver that was already there, and stabilizing the monetary situation. The Kalākaua coins became more acceptable, and by 1888, most of the non-US foreign silver had been exchanged for them. They remained in circulation during the turbulent years of the 1890s in Hawaii, as the monarchy fell and the short-lived republic ended in 1898 with annexation to the United States. Despite the urging of local interests, it was not until 1903 that Congress acted, ordering that the Hawaii silver coins be exchanged by January 1, 1904, or lose status as legal tender. By 1907, coins worth about $814,000 of the $1,000,000 originally issued had been redeemed; they were exchanged for US silver and melted down at the San Francisco Mint.

== Reuse and collecting ==
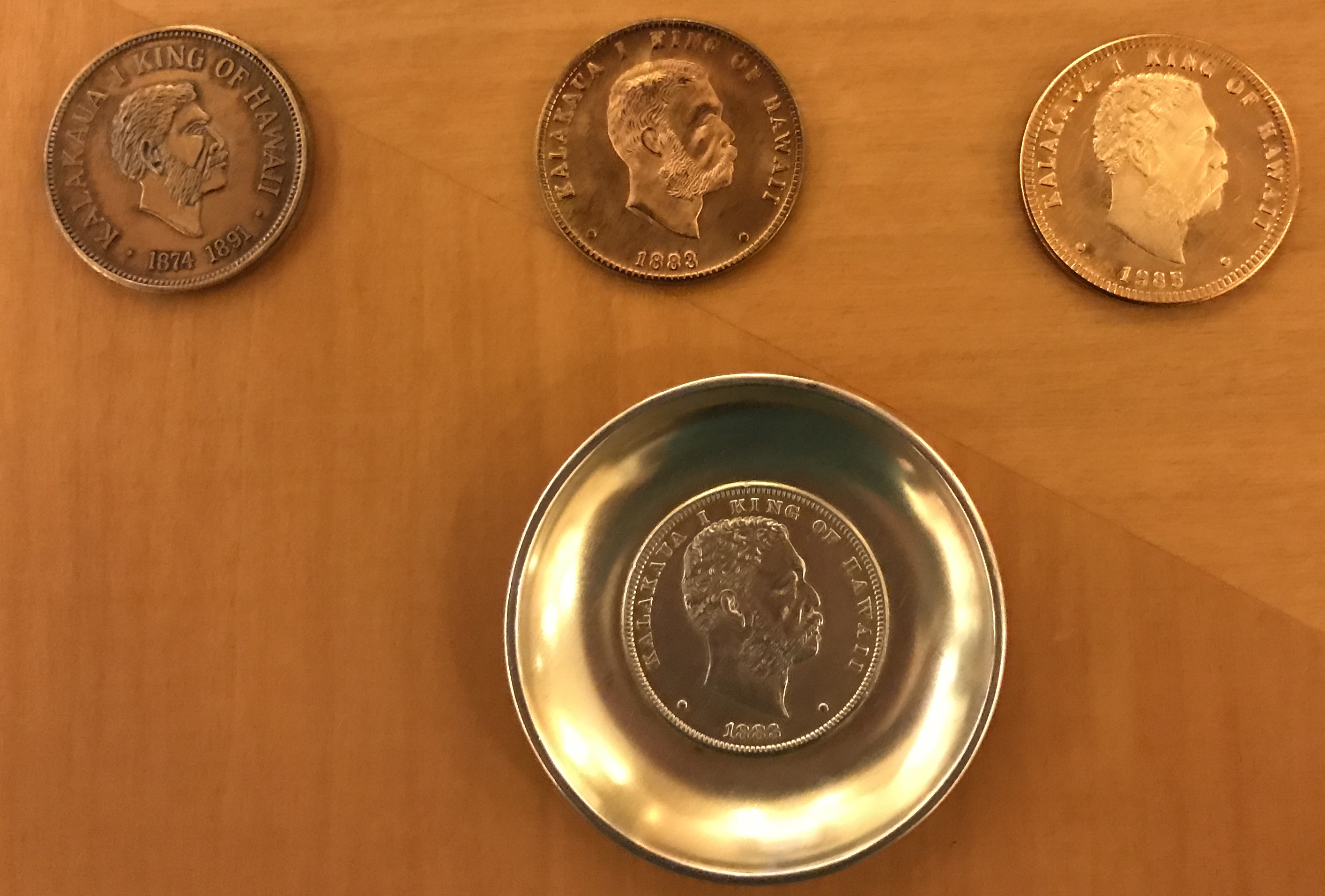
Three modern-day replicas of the Kalākaua dollar grouped with an original, mounted in a small silver dish

Of the coins that were not redeemed, some were likely lost in the fires that devastated Honolulu's Chinatown in 1887 and 1900. Members of that community were often distrustful of banks, and hid valuables in their homes. Quantities of the remainder were used in the jewelry trade, which bought several thousand dollars' worth in the final months the coins remained legal tender. In the years after territorial status was granted Hawaii in 1900, many sought keepsakes of the vanished kingdom, and a large variety of souvenir items featuring the coins were sold as enameled (and unenameled) jewelry: pins, watch fobs, cuff links, belt buckles, hat bands and hat pins. Decorative items such as spoons and napkin rings were also made. Generally, the side featuring the coat of arms is the one enameled.

Members of the coin collecting community own some of the Kalākaua pieces. Richard S. Yeoman's A Guide Book of United States Coins in its 2018 edition lists the quarter dollar as generally the least expensive Hawaii coin, ranging from $50 to $375 for the pieces struck for circulation. Proof coins are much more expensive, especially the 12 1/2 cent piece (hapawalu), a copy of which brought $43,125 at auction in 2011. The Kalākaua coins have been reproduced, and their designs repurposed for privately issued medals. The dies for the original coins were cancelled and are in the Hawaiʻi State Archives.

== Mintages ==
Denomination	Circulation	Proof	Melted	Net distribution
Dime	250,000	26	79	249,947
12 1/2 cents	0	20	0	20
Quarter dollar	500,000	26	257,400	243,626
Half dollar	700,000	26	612,245	87,781
Dollar	500,000	26	453,652	46,374
