= List of peers 1080–1089 =

This page lists all peers who held extant titles between 1080 and 1089.

== Peerage of England ==
Title	Holder	Date gained	Date lost	Notes
Earl of Kent (1067)	Odo of Bayeux	1067	1088	Forfeit
Earl of Cornwall (1068)	Robert, Count of Mortain	1068	1095	
Earl of Dorset (1070)	Osmund, Count of Seez	1070	1099	
Earl of Chester (1071)	Hugh d'Avranches, 1st Earl of Chester	1071	1101	
Earl of Shrewsbury (1074)	Roger de Montgomerie, 1st Earl of Shrewsbury	1074	1094	
Earl of Northampton (1080)	Simon I de Senlis, Earl of Huntingdon-Northampton	1080	1109	New creation
Earl of Albemarle (1081)	Adelaide, 1st Countess of Albemarle	1081	1090	New creation
Earl of Surrey (1088)	William de Warenne, 1st Earl of Surrey	1088	1099	New creation
Earl of Warwick (1088)	Henry de Beaumont, 1st Earl of Warwick	1088	1119	New creation

Preceded by List of peers 1070–1079	Lists of peers by decade 1080–1089	Succeeded by List of peers 1090–1099
