= Causantín, Mormaer of Fife =

Mormaer of Fife

Causantín or Constantine of Fife (fl. 1095–1128) is the first man known for certain to have been mormaer (earl) of Fife, having this authority no later than 1107.

== Ancestry ==
Very little is known about Causantín's life and reign as mormaer of Fife. His father, for instance, is not known by name. He may have been the son or grandson of the Mac Duib who gave rise to William Shakespeare's character Macduff; the latter being the son of Giric, son of Cináed mac Duib or Kenneth III, king of Alba (997–1005). His role as a senior lawman makes it likely that he spent some time in his early life at a native Scottish law school, but this is simply reasoned conjecture.

== Historical significance ==
Causantín's first appearance in history is a charter dated to 1095 when he appears as Constantinus filius Magduffe. The historian John Bannerman has suggested that this represents a translation of Causantín mac meic Duib. Here, mac meic means 'grandson of' or more loosely 'descendant of', in the same way that the Irish used Uí or Ua. The mac meic formula has also been shown in Ireland. The Annals of Ulster (s.a. 1028), for instance, used this formula where they would later use Ua. If Bannerman's suggestion is correct, the charter is calling Causantín the "descendant of Dub" rather than a son of a man with the name MacDuib (= Clan MacDuff). Similar examples can, again, be seen for the more extensive evidence offered by contemporary Ireland. For example, the Annals of Ulster style Tadg, son of Muiredach, as Mac Carthaig, but it was Tadg's grandfather (and Muiredach's father) who was named Carthach. By comparison, the Annals of Innisfallen call the same man mac meic Carthaig. Staying in Ireland, the kings of Cenél nEógain call themselves Meic Lochlainn. One is named Conchobar mac Meic Lochlainn; This very same kindred were also known in Annals of Ulster as the Uí Lochlainn.

== Offices held ==
In 1128, in the fourth year of the reign of King David I of Scotland, Causantín appears as Magnus Judex in Scotia, "High Brithem" of Scotland north of the River Forth, an office held to be the Gaelic precursor to what would become the Justiciarship of Scotia. In this role, he appears alongside the judex (judge) Máel Domnaich mac Meic Bethad (Maldoven son of Macbeth) as arbitrator in a land dispute between a knight called Robert of Burgon (Robert the Burgundian, who owned the estate of Lochore, which bordered the disputed territory), and the Céli Dé of St Serf's Inch. In this case, both Causantín and Máel Domnaich chose to defer to the superior legal wisdom of another judex, Dubgall mac Mocche. Causantín appears in a charter of King David's, dated 1126, giving confirmation of the rights of Dunfermline Priory and promoting it to abbey status. His name occurs as a witness, alongside bishops John of Glasgow, Robert of St Andrews, Cormac of Dunkeld, Gregoir of Moray, Mac Bethad of Rosemarkie, and mormaers Máel Ísu of Strathearn, Ruadrí of Mar, Matad of Atholl, and Causantín's kinsman and eventual successor Gille Míchéil, Chief of Clann meic Duib (Clan MacDuff), among others. Causantín appears to have gotten involved in several disputes with the said monastery, and he is alleged to have withheld lands around Kirkcaldy which had been granted to the monastery.

Causantín appears to have died by 1130, when another member of the Mac Duib kindred, the Gille Míchéil who appeared alongside him in the charter of 1126, was ruling as mormaer; although the latter may have been using the title comes (mormaer) as early as 1126, and had been using the style Mac Duib since at least 1126. Donnchad (Duncan) I, who succeeded Gille Míchéil, may have been Causantín's son.

Regnal titles
First known	Mormaer of Fife c. 1095–1128	Succeeded by Gille Míchéil
Legal offices
First known	Justiciar of Scotia c. 1128–1130	Succeeded by Donnchad II of Fife as next known holder
