= William Fitzeustace, 1st Earl of Gloucester =

Anglo-Norman nobleman

William Fitzeustace, 1st Earl of Gloucester (died 1094) was a Norman peer and was created Earl of Gloucester in 1093, according to some sources. He is tentatively identified, by Burke's Peerage as a son of Eustace II, Count of Boulogne, which is also less certain about the title.
