= List of peers 1070–1079 =

This page lists all peers who held extant titles between 1070 and 1079.

== Peerage of England ==
| Title | Holder | Date gained | Date lost | Notes |
|---|---|---|---|---|
| Earl of Hereford (1067) | William FitzOsbern, 1st Earl of Hereford (Note: Fitz Osbern's entry in the Oxford Dictionary of National Biography questions whether he was earl of Hereford: "He was not even 'earl of Hereford', as he appears in most historical writing. The king certainly made him an earl (comes) in England in 1067, but the title was personal, not territorial, and he had comital authority not just over Herefordshire but probably throughout the southern shires where Harold Godwineson had been earl.") | 1067 | 1072 | Died |
| Earl of Hereford (1067) | Roger de Breteuil, 2nd Earl of Hereford | 1072 | 1074 | Forfeit |
| Earl of Kent (1067) | Odo, Earl of Kent | 1067 | 1088 | |
| Earl of Cornwall (1068) | Robert, Count of Mortain (Note: His position of authority in the south west has therefore led many to consider him as the Earl of Cornwall, although it appears uncertain whether he was formally created as such. The Complete Peerage, III, 428 states while he may have been considered the earl he was only known officially as Comes Moritoniensis. According to Charles Henderson "Count Robert did not call himself Earl of Cornwall [but] enjoyed the power that in the following century belonged to the earls, and after them the dukes". See: Henderson, C. G. (1933) "Cornwall and her patron saint", In: his Essays in Cornish History. Oxford: Clarendon Press; pp. 197–201.) | 1068 | 1095 | |
| Earl of Dorset (1070) | Osmund, Count of Seez | 1070 | 1099 | New creation |
| Earl of Norfolk (1070) | Ralph de Gael, 1st Earl of Norfolk | 1070 | 1074 | New creation; Forfeit |
| Earl of Chester (1071) | Hugh d'Avranches, 1st Earl of Chester | 1071 | 1101 | New creation |
| Earl of Northampton (1072) | Waltheof, 1st Earl of Northampton | 1072 | 1075 | New creation; Died |
| Earl of Shrewsbury (1074) | Roger de Montgomerie, 1st Earl of Shrewsbury | 1074 | 1094 | New creation |

== Notes ==
| Preceded by List of peers 1060–1069 | Lists of peers by decade 1070–1079 | Succeeded by List of peers 1080–1089 |
