= Gille Chlerig, Earl of Mar =

Scottish noble

Gille Chlerig
- Mormaer of Mar
- Predecessor: Ruadrí, Earl of Mar
- Successor: Morggán, Earl of Mar
- Issue: Morggán, Earl of Mar

Gille Chlerig,^{1} also Gillocheri ^{2} or Gillocher, Gillocher or Gylocher is a Gaelic name attested only in a Latin source, a 13th-century forgery designed to advance the cause of Scottish independence. The name is highly corrupted, and therefore the name and meaning is unclear. Gille Chlerig is not known in any capacity other than being father of Morggán, but most scholars seem to be comfortable accepting him as the Mormaer or Earl of Mar who preceded his son Morggán.

== Bibliography ==
- Anderson, Alan Orr, Early Sources of Scottish History: AD 500-1286, 2 Vols (Edinburgh, 1922)
- Richard D. Oram, "The Earls and Earldom of Mar, c1150-1300," Steve Boardman and Alasdair Ross (eds.) The Exercise of Power in Medieval Scotland, c.1200-1500, (Dublin/Portland, 2003). pp. 46–66
- Roberts, John L., Lost Kingdoms: Celtic Scotland in the Middle Ages, (Edinburgh, 1997), pp. 55–6

Preceded by Ruadrí	Mormaer of Mar before 1147	Succeeded by Morggán
