= List of peers 1060–1069 =

This article lists all non-royal peers who carried extant titles between the years 1060 and 1069.

== Peerage of England ==
Title	Holder	Date gained	Date lost	Notes
Earl of Hereford (1067)	William FitzOsbern, 1st Earl of Hereford (Note: Fitz Osbern's entry in the Oxford Dictionary of National Biography questions whether he was earl of Hereford: "He was not even 'earl of Hereford', as he appears in most historical writing. The king certainly made him an earl (comes) in England in 1067, but the title was personal, not territorial, and he had comital authority not just over Herefordshire but probably throughout the southern shires where Harold Godwineson had been earl.")	1067	1072	New creation
Earl of Kent (1067)	Odo, Earl of Kent	1067	1088	New creation
Earl of Cornwall (1068)	Robert, Count of Mortain (Note: His position of authority in the south west has therefore led many to consider him as the Earl of Cornwall, although it appears uncertain whether he was formally created as such. The Complete Peerage, III, 428 states while he may have been considered the earl he was only known officially as Comes Moritoniensis. According to Charles Henderson "Count Robert did not call himself Earl of Cornwall [but] enjoyed the power that in the following century belonged to the earls, and after them the dukes". See: Henderson, C. G. (1933) "Cornwall and her patron saint", In: his Essays in Cornish History. Oxford: Clarendon Press; pp. 197–201.)	1068	1095	New creation

== Notes ==
Preceded by None known	Lists of peers by decade 1060–1069	Succeeded by List of peers 1070–1079
