= William G. Irwin =

Sugar planter and capitalist

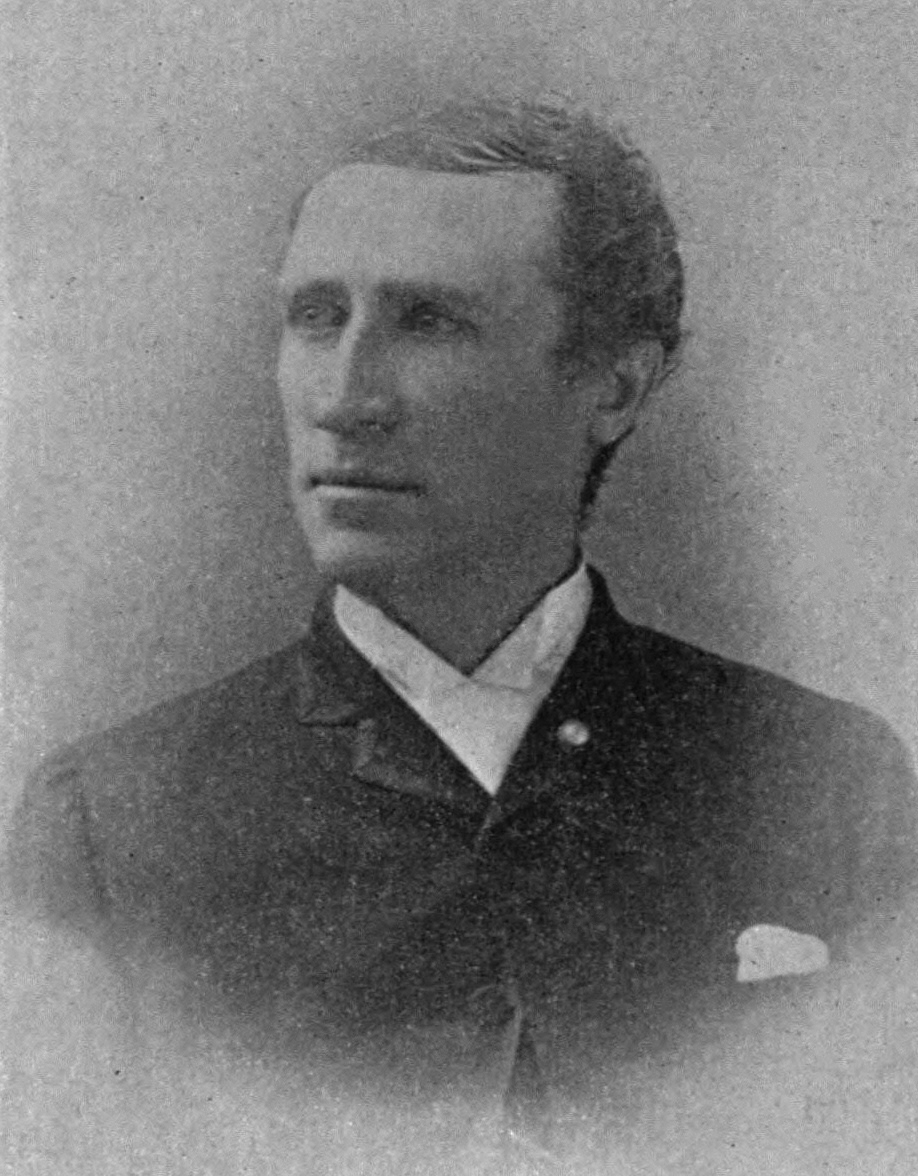
- Born: August 20, 1843; England
- Died: January 28, 1914 (aged 70); San Franicisco
- Education: Punahou School
- Occupation: Businessman
- Spouse: Fannie Ivers Irwin
- Children: Helene Irwin Crocker Fagan

William George Irwin (August 20, 1843 – January 28, 1914) was a capitalist and successful sugar planter in the Kingdom of Hawai'i. He was born in England, and emigrated to Hawaii with his family while still a child. He would remain a British citizen throughout his life. Educated at Punahou School, he was in the right place at the right time to make a lot of money in the sugar plantation market. After the passage of the Reciprocity Treaty of 1875, Irwin formed the William G. Irwin & Co partnership. California entrepreneur Claus Spreckels offered him a separate partnership in 1881, a union that would come to include the Spreckels interests in sugar plantations, and have subsidiaries in banking activities and ship building. Two decades later, after amassing a fortune in his association with Spreckels, Irwin moved away from the plantation activities and relocated to San Francisco, where he continued his affiliations with financial institutions. At his death, Irwin's estate was estimated to be in excess of $10,000,000 (equivalent to $321,428,571 in 2025). His only child Helene married the first time into the wealthy Crocker family of California, and through her second marriage to Paul I. Fagan, became an owner of the San Francisco Seals baseball team.

== Background ==
He was a native of England, born on August 20, 1843 to Alice and James Irwin, a veteran of the British army. The family's original destination was California at the onset of the California Gold Rush, eventually making their way to Hawaii. He was enrolled at Oahu College 1856-57.

== Hawaii ==
After working for other businessmen for several years, and shortly after the passage of the Reciprocity Treaty of 1875, Irwin partnered with John Smith Walker and Zephaniah Swift Spalding to form William G. Irwin & Co. That partnership was terminated in 1880. Irwin was president of the Paauhau and the Kilauea Sugar companies, held stock in other sugar companies, and was one of the March 1882 founders of the Planters Labor and Supply Company.

Irwin served on both Kalākaua's Privy Council of State and Liliʻuokalani's Privy Council of State. He represented Hawaii at the 1900 Exposition Universelle (world's fair) in Paris, and was subsequently awarded the Chevalier of the Legion of Honor by the nation of France.

The 1881 Honolulu Music Hall was built by Irwin for an estimated $40,000. Kalākaua had a royal box in the venue, and a private entrance. Following a bankruptcy in 1883, it eventually re-opened, only to be destroyed by fire in 1895. Irwin, along with John and Adolph Spreckels, rebuilt the venue, reopening a year later.

== Claus Spreckels ==
He partnered with California entrepreneur Claus Spreckels in 1881 to form W. G. Irwin & Co. to handle the Spreckels family interests in Hawaii. Spreckels had also considered George W. Macfarlane, aide-de-camp to King Kalākaua, as a potential associate, but ultimately opted for Irwin. Variations of Irwin's name would be used for other partnership companies with Spreckels. The Oceanic Steamship Company, and J. D. Spreckels and Brothers (sons of Claus), were wholly owned subsidiaries of the Wm. G. Irwin and Co. Ltd. holding company. Among numerous ships built by them was the William G. Irwin barkentine in 1881.

Spreckels & Company was a holding company also known as the Spreckels Bank. Incorporated by Irwin, former California governor Frederick Low and Spreckels, on January 1, 1884, its purpose was to circulate the Kalākaua coinage in Hawaii, and to float loans to the monarchy and government officials. Dissolved by November 1, the partners then funneled their banking activities through William G. Irwin & Co. The only other bank in Hawaii was Bishop & Co., but proliferation of sugar money necessitated that other banks be allowed incorporation. Towards that end, the legislature passed what became known as the Banking Act of 1884, signed into law by Kalākaua on August 11.

Spreckels was a practical royalist, who believed the monarchy's labor importation policies benefited the sugar industry. After the overthrow of the Hawaiian Kingdom, Spreckels found himself at odds over the issue with other planters, and supported Liliʻuokalani's return to the throne. If Hawaii were annexed, the 1882 Chinese Exclusion Act would likely apply to the islands and cut deeply into the plantation labor supply. He eventually abandoned his Hawaii involvement, and left the Hawaii business for Irwin and his sons John D., Claus August and Adolph to manage. Spreckels took his case to Washington D. C. and lobbied through two administrations against annexation. With Spreckels no longer a hands-on partner, his Hawaiian businesses fell to internal issues among his sons. Spreckels died in 1908 and Irwin had the Spreckels bank reincorporated as the Bank of Honolulu, Limited. William G. Irwin & Co. merged with C. Brewer & Co. in 1909.

== Family and final years ==
Irwin had met and married his wife Fannie (or Fanny) Ivers Holliday in San Francisco in 1886. By 1904, he was becoming less active with his Hawaiian sugar interests, and built a home in San Francisco. Claus Spreckels lived in the city and had a sugar refinery in the area. Irwin had become affiliated with San Francisco financial institutions since he joined Mercantile Trust Company in 1899. That was followed by his association with Savings Union Bank and Trust Company in 1909, and with the Mercantile National Bank in 1910.

Irwin died in San Francisco on January 28, 1914, having retained his British citizenship throughout his life. His estate had an estimated worth in excess of $10,000,000 (equivalent to $321,428,571 in 2025), the bulk of which went to his widow. Other cash bequests were made to family members and household servants. Two charities in San Francisco each received $25,000.

Fannie and William's only child Helene was born in Honolulu in 1887. Irwin bequeathed $250,000 to her in his will. Her first marriage in 1911 was to Charles Templeton Crocker, a banker, playwright, and part of the extended wealthy Crocker family in California. On her wedding day, Irwin gave her a gift of $1,000,000 in investments, and the news media estimated the couple's combined wealth and potential inheritances at $20,000,000. The couple divorced in 1928, and she married businessman Paul I. Fagan. The Fagans invested in a ranch on Molokai, as well as a luxury resort hotel at Hana on the island of Maui. Additionally, they maintained a home on Oahu, and owned the San Francisco Seals baseball team 1945–1953. Paul died in 1960, followed by Helene in 1966.

== Bibliography ==
- Alexander, William DeWitt (1907). Oahu college: list of trustees, presidents, instructors, matrons, librarians, superintendents of grounds and students, 1841-1906. Historical sketch of Oahu college. Hawaiian Gazette Company.
- Angell, Lowell (2011). Theatres of Hawai'i. Arcadia Publishing. ISBN 9781439640500.
- anon (1914). "William G. Irwin passes away". Coast Banker and California Banker. 12 (2): 119.
- Kuykendall, Ralph Simpson (1967). The Hawaiian Kingdom 1874–1893, The Kalakaua Dynasty. Vol. 3. Honolulu: University of Hawaii Press. ISBN 978-0-87022-433-1. OCLC 500374815.
- MacLennan, Carol A. (2014). Sovereign Sugar: Industry and Environment in Hawaii. University of Hawai'i Press. ISBN 978-0-8248-4024-2. - Available at Project MUSE
