= Saer de Quincy, 1st Earl of Winchester =

Scottish Earl (c. 1155–1219)

- Born: about 1155; Winchester, Hampshire, England
- Died: 3 November 1219; Damietta, Egypt
- Spouse: Margaret de Beaumont
- Issue: Loretta de Quincy; Hawise de Quincy; Sir Robert de Quincy; Roger de Quincy, 2nd Earl of Winchester; Saer de Quincy; Arabella de Quincy; John de Quincy; Robert II de Quincy
- Father: Robert de Quincy
- Mother: Orabilis

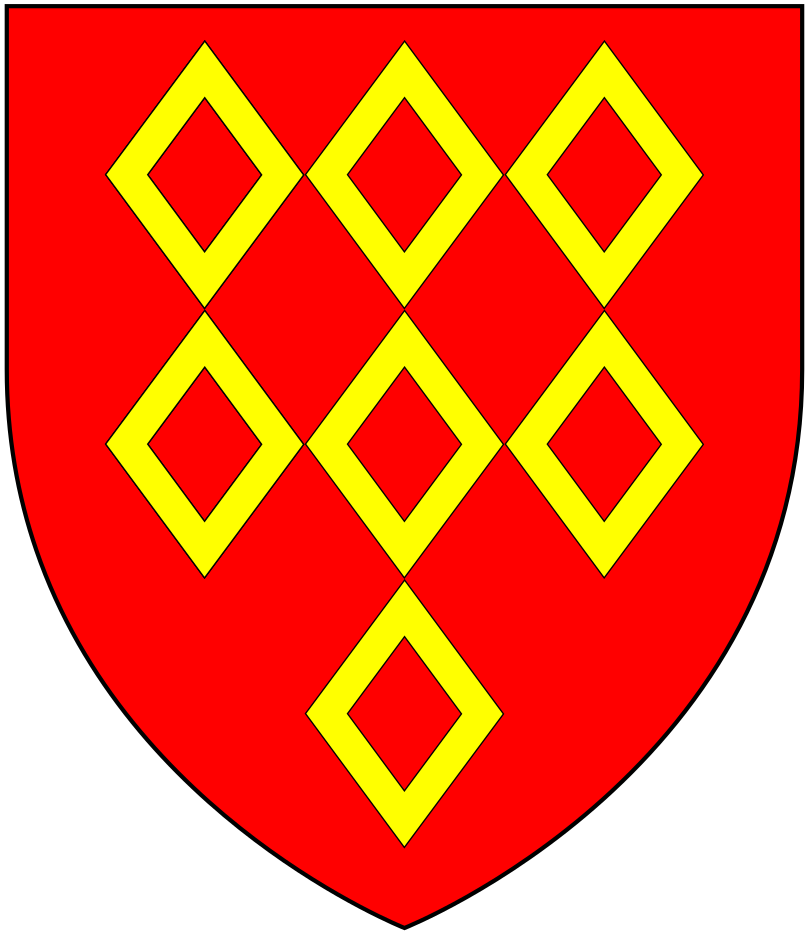
Arms of De Quincy: Gules, seven mascles or 3,3,1, adopted at the start of the age of heraldry, circa 1200–1215.

Saer de Quincy, 1st Earl of Winchester (c. 1155 – 3 November 1219) was one of the leaders of the baronial rebellion against John, King of England, and a major figure in both the kingdoms of Scotland and England in the decades around the turn of the twelfth and thirteenth centuries.

== Scottish upbringing ==
Although he was an Anglo-Norman, Saer de Quincy's father, Robert de Quincy, had married and held important lordships in the Scottish kingdom of his cousin King William the Lion. His mother, Orabilis, was the heiress of the lordship of Leuchars and through her husband Robert became lord over lands in Fife, Perth and Lothian.

Saer's own rise to prominence in England came partly through his marriage to Margaret, the younger sister of Robert de Beaumont, 4th Earl of Leicester. Earl Robert died in 1204, and left Margaret as co-heiress to the vast earldom along with her elder sister. The estate was split in half, and after the final division was ratified in 1207, de Quincy was made Earl of Winchester.

== Earl of Winchester ==
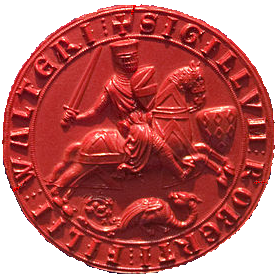
Seal of Robert Fitzwalter (d.1235). So close was the alliance between both men that the seal shows the arms of Saer de Quincy (seven mascles 3,3,1) on a separate shield before FitzWalter horse, with FitzWalter's own arms on his own shield and on his horse's caparison.

Following his marriage, Winchester became a prominent military and diplomatic figure in England. There is no evidence of any close alliance with King John, however, and his rise to importance was probably due to his newly acquired magnate status and the family connections that underpinned it.

Saer seems to have developed a close personal relationship with his 2nd cousin, Robert Fitzwalter (died 1235) the son of Walter Fitzrobert and Maud de Lucy. In 1203, they served as co-commanders of the garrison at the major fortress of Vaudreuil in Normandy. They surrendered the castle without a fight to Philip II of France, fatally weakening the English position in northern France. Although popular opinion seems to have blamed them for the capitulation, a royal writ is extant stating that the castle was surrendered at King John's command, and both Winchester and Fitzwalter endured personal humiliation and heavy ransoms at the hands of the French.

In Scotland, he was perhaps more successful. In 1211 to 1212, the Earl of Winchester commanded an imposing retinue of a hundred knights and a hundred serjeants in William the Lion's campaign against the Mac William rebels, a force which some historians have suggested may have been the mercenary force from Brabant lent to the campaign by John.

== Magna Carta ==
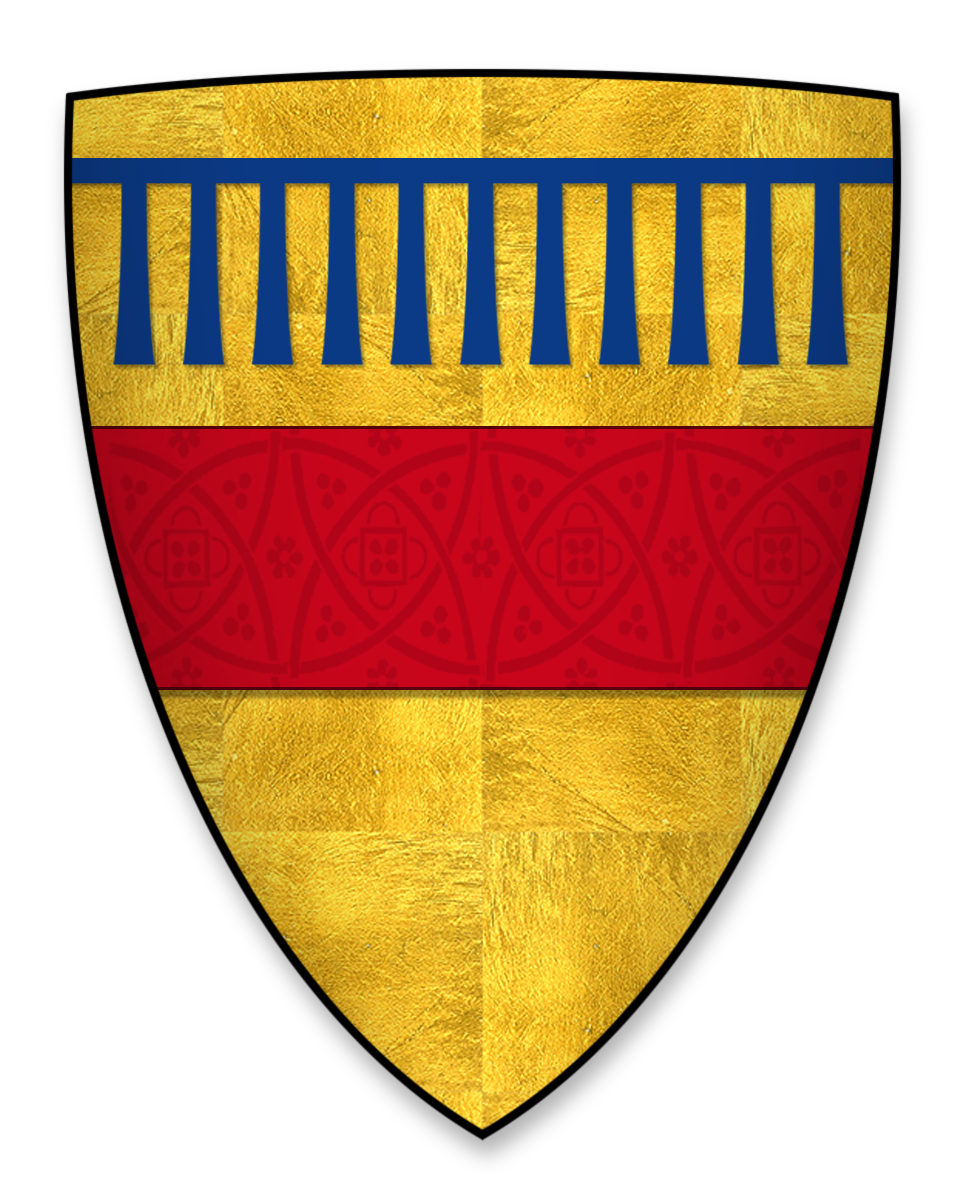
Arms displayed by Earl Saer on his seal on Magna Carta. These differ from his arms used elsewhere but can also be seen in stained glass at Winchester Great Hall.

In 1215, when the baronial rebellion broke out, Robert Fitzwalter became the military commander, and the Earl of Winchester joined him, acting as one of the chief authors of Magna Carta and negotiators with John; both cousins were among the 25 guarantors of Magna Carta. His name is mentioned in Clause 61, (1215) de Quincy fought against John in the troubles that followed the sealing of the Charter, and, again with Fitzwalter, travelled to France to invite Prince Louis of France to take the English throne. He and Fitzwalter were subsequently among the most committed and prominent supporters of Louis's candidature for the kingship, against both John and the infant Henry III.

== The Fifth Crusade ==
When military defeat cleared the way for Henry III to take the throne, de Quincy went on crusade, perhaps in fulfilment of an earlier vow. In 1219 he left to join the Fifth Crusade, then besieging Damietta.

== Death ==
While in Damietta in 1219, he fell sick and died. He was buried in Acre, the capital of the Kingdom of Jerusalem, rather than in Egypt, and his heart was brought back and interred at Garendon Abbey near Loughborough, a house endowed by his wife's family. Garendon Abbey was disestablished in 1536, with the last abbot being Randolph Arnold.

== Family ==
The family of de Quincy had arrived in Scotland and England after the Norman Conquest, and took their name from Cuinchy, in the Arrondissement of Béthune; the personal name "Saer" was used by them over several generations. Both names are variously spelt in primary sources and older modern works, the first name being sometimes rendered Saher or Seer and the surname as Quency or Quenci.

== Marriage and issue ==
Saer de Quincy (known to historians as "Saer I") was lord of the manor of Long Buckby in Northamptonshire in the earlier twelfth century, and second husband of Maud de Senlis, daughter of Simon I de Senlis, Earl of Huntingdon-Northampton and Maud of Huntingdon, stepdaughter of King David I of Scotland. They had:

- Saer II (d.1219)
- Robert de Quincy.

Saer de Quincy married Margaret de Beaumont, youngest daughter of Robert de Beaumont, 3rd Earl of Leicester, and Petronilla de Grandmesnil.

They had:

- Loretta de Quincy, who married Sir William de Valognes, Chamberlain of Scotland.
- Arabella de Quincy, who married Sir Richard Harcourt.
- Robert de Quincy (died 1217), c. 1206 he married Hawise of Chester, 1st Countess of Lincoln, daughter of Hugh de Kevelioc, 5th Earl of Chester and Bertrade de Montfort of Évreux
- Roger de Quincy, who succeeded his father as earl of Winchester, married Helen of Galloway, daughter of Alan of Galloway, constable of Scotland
- Robert de Quincy (second son of that name; died 1257), who married Elen, daughter of the Welsh prince Llywelyn the Great.
- Hawise de Quincy, who married Hugh de Vere, 4th Earl of Oxford.
- John de Quincy (died young.)
- Saher de Quincy (died young.)

Peerage of England
New creation	Earl of Winchester; 1207–1219	Succeeded by Roger de Quincy

== Bibliography ==
- Ancestral roots of certain American colonists who came to America before 1700 lineages from Alfred the Great, Charlemagne, Malcolm of Scotland, Robert the Strong, and other historical individuals 8th ed. / edited with additions and corrections by William R. Beall and Kaleen E. Beall. by Frederick Lewis Weis Retrieved 2024-12-19. 58–60.
- Blakely, Ruth Margaret (2005). The Brus Family in England and Scotland, 1100-1295. The Boydell Press.73
- Carpenter, David A. (1990). The Minority of Henry III. University of California Press.
- Grant G. Simpson, "An Anglo-Scottish Baron of the Thirteenth century: the Acts of Roger de Quincy Earl of Winchester and Constable of Scotland" (Published PhD Thesis, Edinburgh 1966). Retrieved 2024-12-19..
- Grosseteste, Robert (2010). The Letters of Robert Grosseteste, Bishop of Lincoln. Translated by Mantello, F.A.C.; Goering, Joseph. University of Toronto Press.
- Leuchars Parish Church. Retrieved 2024-12-19.
- Hanley, Catherine (2016). Louis: The French Prince who invaded England. Yale University Press.
- Maddicott, J. R. (1994). Simon de Montfort. Cambridge University Press.
- Morvan, Frederic (2009). La Chevalerie bretonne et la formation de l'armee ducale, 1260-1341. Presses Universitaires de Rennes. ISBN 978-2-7535-0827-9.
- Poole, Austin Lane (1993). From Domesday Book to Magna Carta, 1087-1216. Oxford University Press.
- Paul LePortier, Familles médiévales normandes (Normandie, France: éditions Page de Garde, 2005)). Retrieved 2024-12-19.
- Prestonpans : a social & economic history across 1000 years 2006). Retrieved 2024-12-21
- Simpson, Grant G. (1985). "The Familia of Roger de Quincy, Earl of Winchester and Constable of Scotland". In Stringer, K.J. (ed.). Essays on the Nobility of Medieval Scotland. John Donald Publishers Ltd. pp. 102–129.
- Sidney Painter, "The House of Quency, 1136-1264", Medievalia et Humanistica, 11 (1957) 3–9; reprinted in his book Feudalism and Liberty
- Tout, Thomas Frederick (1969). The History of England from the Accession of Henry III to the Death of Edward III, 1216-1377. Greenwood Press.
- Wilkinson, Louise J. (2007). Women in Thirteenth-century Lincolnshire. The Boydell Press.
- "Winchester", in The Complete Peerage, 2nd ed., ed. G.E.C. et al., Vol.12ii. pp. 745–751
