= Gartnait, Earl of Buchan =

First mormaer of Buchan to be known by name

Gartnait of Buchan is the first mormaer of Buchan to be known by name. He was married to a woman named Ete (or Ite), the daughter of a Gille Míchéil, whom he appears alongside in a grant to Deer recorded in the Gaelic Notes on the Book of Deer. This is surely Gille Míchéil, mormaer of Fife. The same source tells us that Gartnait was the son of Cainnech, although it does not tell us if this Cainnech had previously been mormaer.

He had a daughter Éva, whom he married to Colbán, his successor.

== Bibliography ==
- Anderson, Alan Orr, Early Sources of Scottish History: AD 500-1286, 2 Vols (Edinburgh, 1922)
- Roberts, John L., Lost Kingdoms: Celtic Scotland in the Middle Ages, (Edinburgh, 1997), pp. 49–50

Preceded by ?Cainnech	Mormaer of Buchan fl. after 1131	Succeeded by Colbán
