= Robert de Quincy =

English and Scottish noble

Sir Robert de Quincy
- Baron of Prestoungrange
- Noble family: Quincy family
- Spouses: Orabilis; Eve

Sir Robert de Quincy, 1st Baron of Prestoungrange (c. 1140 – c. 1197), Justiciar of Lothian, was a 12th-century English and Scottish noble.

== Life ==
Quincy was a younger son of Saer de Quincy and Maud de Senlis, daughter of Simon I de Senlis, Earl of Huntingdon-Northampton and Maud of Huntingdon, stepdaughter of King David I of Scotland.

Robert was granted the castle of Forfar and a "toft" (a homestead) in Haddington He served as joint Justiciar of Lothian serving from 1171 to 1178.

Robert accompanied King Richard I of England on the Third Crusade in 1190. He led a force to take aid to Antioch in 1191 and also collected prisoners from Tyre. Returning from the crusade, Robert took part in Richard I's campaigns in Normandy in 1194 and 1196. He succeeded to the English estates of his nephew Saer in 1192.

== Marriage and issue ==
Robert married Orabilis, daughter of Nes fitz William, Lord of Leuchars.

They had:

- Saer de Quincy (died 1219), married Margaret de Beaumont, daughter of Robert de Beaumont, 3rd Earl of Leicester
- Unknown (daughter) de Quincy married de St Andrew

Orabilis and Robert divorced.

Secondly, he married Eve(possibly the daughter of Uhtred, lord of Galloway).

== Bibliography ==
- Beam, Amanda; Bradley, John; Broun, Dauvit; Davies, John Reuben (2019). "Walter Barclay, chamberlain (d.c.1193)". People of Medieval Scotland 1093 - 1371.
- Hammond, Matthew (2006). "Orabilis (or Orabila), Countess of Mar". In Ewan, Elizabeth L.; Innes, Sue; Reynolds, Sian (eds.). Biographical Dictionary of ScottishWomen. Edinburgh University Press.
- Macquarie, Alan (1997). Scotland and the Crusades, 1095-1560. John Donald. ISBN 9780859764452.
- Marshall, Susan (2021). Illegitimacy in Medieval Scotland, 1100-1500. Boydell Press.
- Oram, Richard D. (2005). "Quincy, Saer de, earl of Winchester (d. 1219)". Oxford Dictionary of National Biography. Oxford University Press.
- Stringer, Keith John (1985). Earl David of Huntingdon, 1152-1219: a study in Anglo-Scottish history. Edinburgh University Press. ISBN 9780852244869.

Baronage of Scotland
| Preceded by New Creation | Baron of Prestoungrange; 1189-1197 | Succeeded by Saer de Quincy, 1st Earl of Winchester |
