= Morggán, Earl of Mar =

12th-century Scottish noble

Morggán of Mar is the first Mormaer or Earl of Mar to appear in history as "more than a characterless name in a witness-list.". He is often known as Morgrund or Morgan. His father was Gille Chlerig.

It is possible that Morggán participated in the so-called Revolt of the Earls, a protest by some of the native Scottish nobility during King Máel Coluim IV's trip to France as a vassal of King Henry II of England.

It is also possible that he became estranged from the French-speaking king William I, because Morggán's name does not appear in royal acts of the latter king's reign.

He married Agnes, a patroness of churches. Agnes was probably related to the de Warenne family - the family who married Ada de Warenne to Henry of Scotland - and who was mother of Kings Malcolm IV and William the Lion. Morggán and Agnes had at least one son, Donnchad, who eventually succeeded to become a Mormaer of Mar. Morggán had another two sons, Máel Coluim and James, but they may have been illegitimate - that is, the product of an uncanonical marriage acceptable in the Celtic system, but not in the Franco-Roman system that was gaining favour in Scotland at the time.

He went on to marry Orabilis FitzNess de Leuchars, divorced wife of Sir Robert de Quincy, Justiciar of Lothian, who, with her first husband, was the mother of Saher de Quincy. Orabilis survived Morggán, and married thirdly Adam of Fife, brother of Duncan II, Earl of Fife.

His daughter Alesta of Mar was married to Alan Fitzwalter, 2nd High Steward of Scotland and was possibly mother to Walter Stewart, 3rd High Steward of Scotland.

He appears in royal charters dated as early as 1147. He is attested in the documents for the last time in 1178, and was dead by 1183.

== Bibliography ==
- Richard D. Oram, "The Earls and Earldom of Mar, c1150-1300,"
- Steve Boardman and Alasdair Ross (eds.) The Exercise of Power in Medieval Scotland, c.1200-1500, (Dublin/Portland, 2003).

Preceded by Gille Chlerig	Mormaer of Mar before 1147– before 1183	Succeeded by Gille Críst
