= Donnchad I, Earl of Fife =

Gaelic magnate

Donnchad, Earl of Fife (1113–1154), usually known in English as Duncan, was the first Gaelic magnate to have his territory regranted to him by feudal charter, by King David in 1136. Duncan, as head of the native Scottish nobility, had the job of introducing and conducting King Malcolm around the Kingdom upon his accession; however, Malcolm died not long after being crowned.

He is known to have fathered two sons and one daughter:

- Duncan II, his son and heir, succeeded his father in 1154.
- Adam of Fife. In 1163 or 1164, 'Adam, son of the Earl' witnessed the confirmation by Richard, Bishop of St. Andrews. His name occurs third in a list of sixteen witnesses (Reg Prior St. Andrews, No 137). He may have been 'Adam, son of Duncan', who, with Orabilis his wife, witnessed about 1172, the grant of the church of Lochres (Lewchars) by Nes, the son of William, to the church of St. Andrews. His wife Orabilis had previously been the wife of Sir Robert de Quincy, from whom she was probably divorced, and she married, thirdly, Morggán, Earl of Mar.
- Afreka, wife of Harold the elder, Earl of Orkney, and mother by him of two sons and two daughters.

== Bibliography ==
- Bannerman, John, "MacDuff of Fife", in A. Grant & K.Stringer (eds.) Medieval Scotland: Crown, Lordship and Community, Essays Presented to G.W.S. Barrow (Edinburgh, 1993), pp 20–38

== Links ==
- Profile, archive.org

Preceded by Gille Míchéil	Mormaer of Fife; 1133–1154	Succeeded by Donnchad II
