= Gille Míchéil, Mormaer of Fife =

Mormaer of Fife

Gille Míchéil
- Mormaer of Fife
- Tenure: c. 1130 – 1133
- Predecessor: Causantín, Mormaer of Fife
- Successor: Donnchad I, Earl of Fife
- Issue: Aed, Abbot of Abernethy

Mormaer Gille Míchéil (d. bef. July 1136) is the second man known for certain to have been Mormaer of Fife from 1130 to 1133, although it is unlikely he actually was the second. He had at least one son, called Aed (=Hugh). Aed would have succeeded Donnchad I under a Celtic system, but as feudal rules of primogeniture came into force during the reign of Donnchad I, it was Donnchad's son, and not Gille Míchéil's, who became the next mormaer. Aed, though, probably succeeded to the leadership of Clann Duib, at least during Donnchad I's minority, and certainly became Abbot of Abernethy, an office which his own son, Orm, later inherited.

== Bibliography ==
- Bannerman, John, "MacDuff of Fife," in A. Grant & K.Stringer (eds.) Medieval Scotland: Crown, Lordship and Community, Essays Presented to G.W.S. Barrow, (Edinburgh, 1993), pp. 20–38

Preceded by Causantín	Mormaer of Fife before 1130 – 1133	Succeeded by Donnchad I
