= Walter Giffard, 1st Earl of Buckingham =

Anglo-Norman magnate

Walter Giffard, Lord of Longueville in Normandy, 1st Earl of Buckingham (died 1102) was an Anglo-Norman magnate.

== Biography ==
Giffard was the son of Walter Giffard, Lord of Longueville (one of the few proven companions of William the Conqueror at the Battle of Hastings in 1066) and Ermengarde daughter of Gerard Flaitel. His father had been given 107 lordships, 48 of which were in Buckinghamshire which Giffard inherited by 1085. The caput of his feudal honor was at Crendon, Buckinghamshire.

Giffard held an important castle at Longueville overlooking the River Scie as well as vast estates in Buckinghamshire. As he held lands in both England and Normandy he was a vassal to both Robert Curthose and William Rufus. But Rufus purchased his loyalty along with several other key cross-Channel barons and fortified Giffard's and the other castles, garrisoning them with knights in the king's employ who could now ravage northeastern Normandy. Giffard also served Rufus as Justiciar of England, and it was probably Rufus who created him Earl of Buckingham in 1097. Giffard was one of the great magnates who joined Robert Curthose's 1101 invasion of England against Henry I of England. He died 15 July 1102 in England and his body was returned to Normandy, where it was interred at St. Mary's Church at Longueville-sur-Scie, the caput of his Norman honors.

Giffard was married to Agnes de Ribemont, (Note: Agnes de Ribemont, as the widow of Walter Giffard, was reputed to be the mistress of Robert Curthose. It remains unclear if or when she and Curthose even had an affair, but the story goes that she promised that if he would marry her he'd have the support of her powerful family. William of Malmesbury loved a good story, even if untrue, and in one version of his Gesta Regum he credits Sybilla's death to Robert's 'mistress' and in a later version he stated 'mid-wife.' However plausible it may have been that she was Robert's mistress, it remains less than plausible that Curthose allowed his new wife, Sybilla, the mother of his infant son to be poisoned while he sat idly by. Orderic Vitalis may have seen such a story just as further evidence Robert Curthose was unfit to rule Normandy. The mysterious story also has a chronological problem in that Agnes de Ribemont may not even have been a widow at the time of Sybilla's death, and if so, not free to marry.) sister of Anselm of Ribemont. (Note: Anselm de Ribemont was noted for his letters to his liege lord Manasses II, Archbishop of Reims describing the crusade in vivid details. Anselm was killed at the Siege of Arqa in 1099.) His heir was his son, Walter Giffard, 2nd Earl of Buckingham.

== Sources ==
- Aird, William M., Robert Curthose Duke of Normandy (Woodbridge: Boydell Press, 2008)
- Cokayne, George E., The Complete Peerage of England, Scotland, Ireland, Great Britain and the United Kingdom, Extant, Extinct or Dormant, Vol. II, Ed. Vicary Gibbs (London: St. Catherine Press, 1912)

Peerage of England
New creation	Earl of Buckingham; 1st creation 1097–1102	Succeeded by Walter Giffard
