= Donnchad II, Earl of Fife =

Scottish Earl

Mormaer Duncan II Earl of Fife

Mormaer of Fife
- In office 1154–1204

Personal details
- Born: before 1154
- Died: 1204

Donnchad II (died 1204), anglicized as Duncan II or Dunecan II, succeeded his father Duncan I as Earl of Fife in childhood. As a child of the previous mormaer, he was entitled to succeed his father through primogeniture, but not to lead his kin-group, Clann MacDuib. That probably fell to his cousin, Aed mac Gille Míchéil. Like previous mormaers of Fife, Duncan II was appointed Justiciar of Scotia (i.e. Scotland North of the Forth). Donnchad's minority also meant that Ferchar, Mormaer of Strathearn, took supreme place as head of the Gaelic nobility and guide for the boy-king Malcolm IV.

The scholar Geoffrey Barrow suggests that it was during Duncan's tenure that Beinn MacDuibh took its names, i.e. when Duncan II acquired land in that area (Barrow, 1980, 86). Duncan, like other mormaers of Fife, kept in close association with the king. His name is recorded, among other places, in a charter granted to the priory on the Isle of May.

Duncan's person was required to be a hostage following the defeat of William the Lion and the Treaty of Falaise, although in fact he certainly sent someone else in his place (Barrow, 2003, 106).

On Christmas Day 1160, he married Ada (Ela/Hela/Adela) who is named in official documents as a close relative of King Malcolm IV, translated as a half-sister by his father Henry or niece from the Latin text. Malcolm IV's father Henry is believed to have had children prior to his marriage. Duncan II had three sons, Malcolm, Duncan and David, two notably named for the Scottish kings. He had a fourth child, a daughter, whose name is unknown. The earls of Fife are considered to have been important allies of the Scottish kings from King David I onward. In 1152, on the death of Scottish king David I's son Henry of Scotland, Duncan I had escorted Malcolm IV, introducing him as the royal heir.

His son Malcolm succeeded him in 1204.

== Bibliography ==
- Bannerman, John, "MacDuff of Fife," in A. Grant & K.Stringer (eds.) Medieval Scotland: Crown, Lordship and Community, Essays Presented to G.W.S. Barrow, (Edinburgh, 1993), pp. 20–38
- Barrow, G. W. S., The Anglo-Norman Era in Scottish History, (Oxford, 1980).
- Barrow, G. W. S. Earls of Fife in the 12th Century, (Proceedings of the Society of Antiquaries of Scotland, 1952–53), pp. 51–61.
- Barrow, G. W. S., The Kingdom of the Scots: Government, Church and Society from the Eleventh to the Fourteenth Century, (Edinburgh, 2003)
- Paul, Sir James Balfour (ed.), Wood's Edition of David Douglas's Scots Peerage (Edinburgh, 1907).

Titles of nobility
Preceded by Donnchad I	Mormaer of Fife; 1154–1204	Succeeded by Máel Coluim I
Legal offices
Preceded by Causantín of Fife as last-known holder	Justiciar of Scotia c. 1154 – 1204 with Matthew, Bishop of Aberdeen (c. 1172 – 1199); Gille Brigte, Earl of Strathearn (c. 1172 – 1199)	Succeeded by William Comyn as next-known holder
