= Ruadrí, Earl of Mar =

Scottish Earl

Ruadrí of Mar is the first-known mormaer, or earl, of Mar from the 12th century, although the mormaerdom was much older. For instance, there was a mormaer of Mar at the Battle of Clontarf, 1014.

He was a witness to a confirmation of lands to the newly established Abbey of the Holy Trinity at Dunfermline, by David I in 1128.

He is mentioned as Ruadrí mormar Marr in the Gaelic notes on the Book of Deer. This means his floruit dates a little after 1130.

Preceded by ?	Mormaer of Mar fl. 1130s	Succeeded by ?Gille Chlerig
