= Colbán, Earl of Buchan =

Scottish noble

Colbán of Buchan is the second mormaer of Buchan to be known by name as Mormaer.

Colbán was not the son of his predecessor Gartnait. It is possible that Colbán came from another Buchan family, or even, as some have suggested, Fife. He perhaps obtained Buchan by marrying the daughter of Gartnait, whose name is recorded as Éva. He had a son named Magnus, and another called Merleswain, who became known as Merleswain of Kennoway. Colbán was in the Scottish army that invaded England with King William I of Scotland in 1174.

== Bibliography ==
- Roberts, John L., Lost Kingdoms: Celtic Scotland in the Middle Ages, (Edinburgh, 1997), pp. 49–50
- Young, Alan, "Buchan in the 13th century" in Alexander Grant & Keith J. Stringer (eds.) Medieval Scotland: Crown, Lordship and Community Essays Presented to G.W.S Barrow, (Edinburgh, 1993)

Preceded by Gartnait	Mormaer of Buchan fl. 1174	Succeeded by Fergus
