= Walter Giffard, 2nd Earl of Buckingham =

English noble

Walter Giffard, 2nd Earl of Buckingham (died 1164) was an English peer.

Giffard inherited the earldom in 1102 from his father Walter Giffard, 1st Earl of Buckingham, and died without issue in 1164 (during the reign of King Henry II); he was buried in Nutley, Sussex. His estate was divided between William Marshal, Earl of Pembroke, and Richard de Clare, Earl of Hertford, who were the two heirs of Rohais, sister of the first Earl of Buckingham.

As one historian noted later, "Giffard seems to have kept himself away from court.." and "little of their activity appears in the record[s]".

Peerage of England
Preceded by Walter Giffard	Earl of Buckingham; 1102–1164	Extinct
