= Gillies Hill =

Hill in Stirling, Scotland

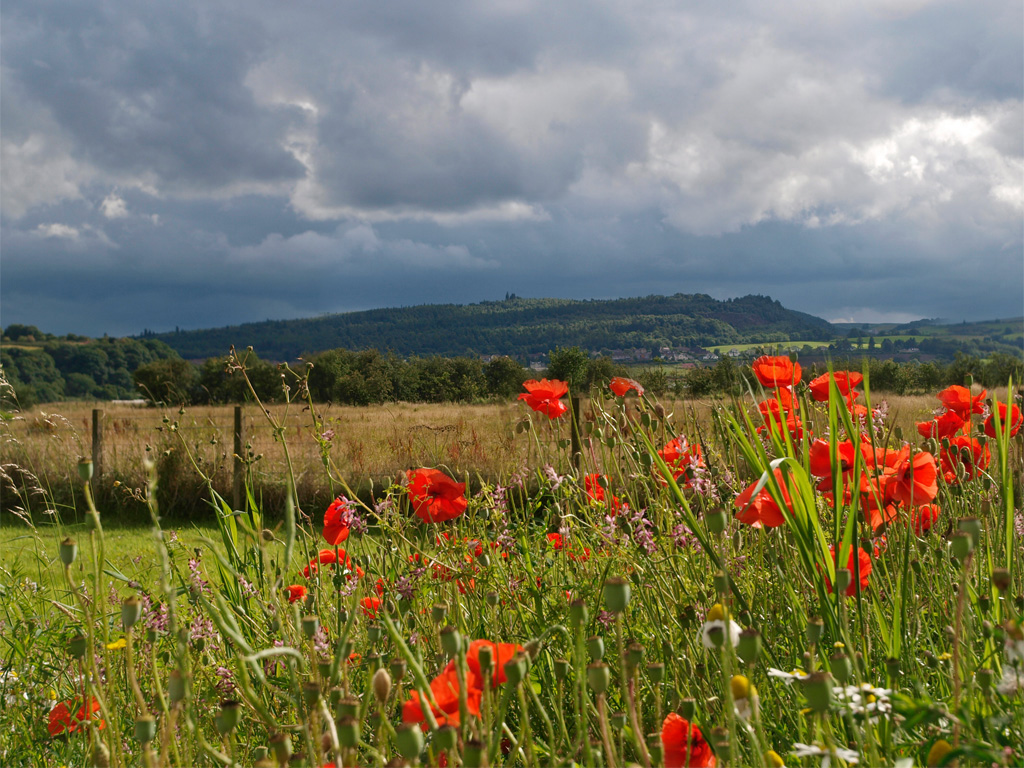
- The view of Gillies Hill, Scotland, taken from beneath Stirling Castle

Highest point
- Elevation: 162 m (531 ft)
- Prominence: 85 m (279 ft)
- Coordinates: 56°05′51″N 3°58′33″W

Geography
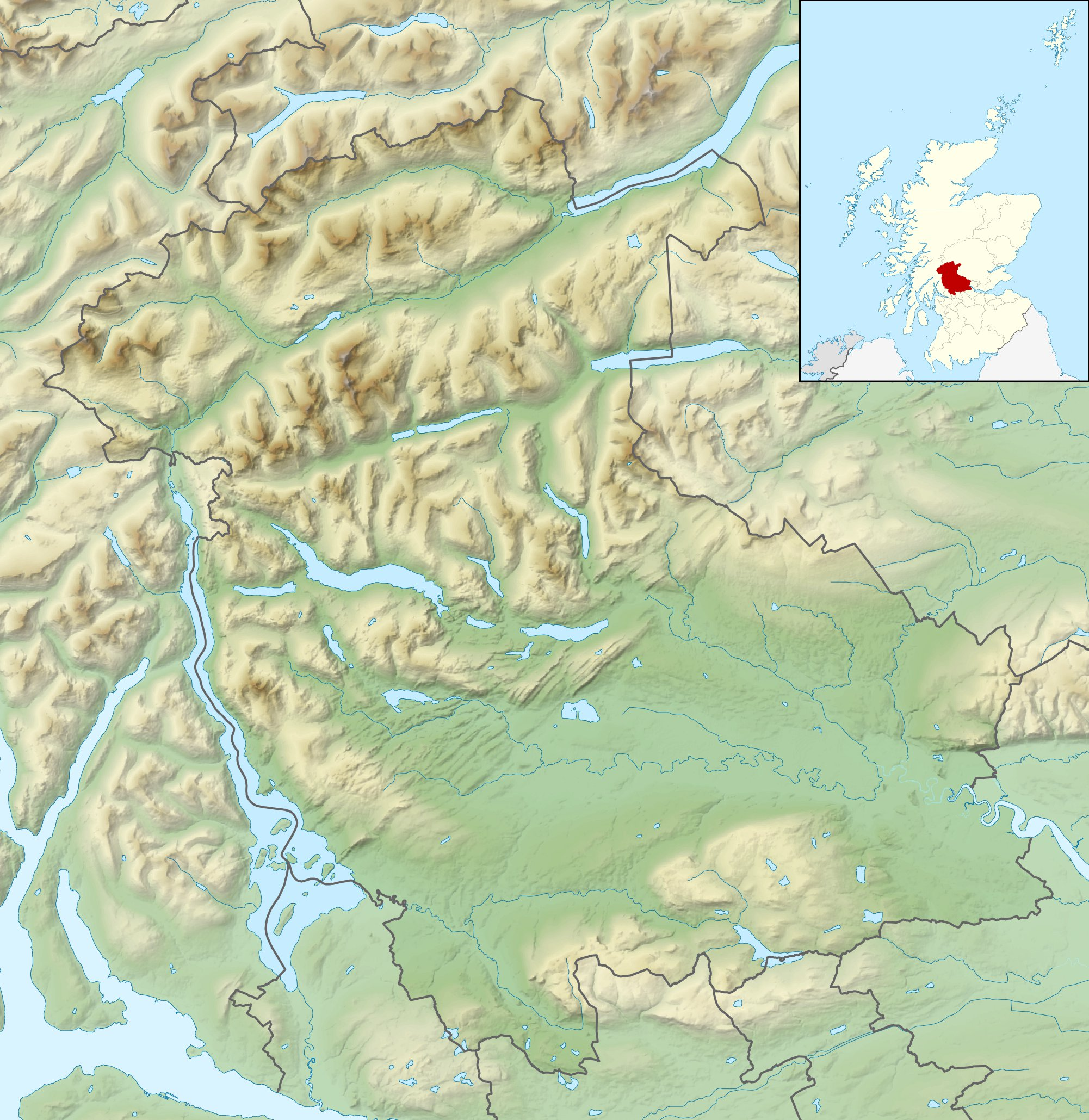
- Location within Stirling
- Location: Scotland
- OS grid: NS771911

Gillies Hill is located west of Stirling and the M9, south of Cambusbarron, and north of the Bannock Burn in Central Scotland.

Gillies Hill covers a 140 hectares (350 acres) crag and tail which rises from a height of 79 metres (259 ft) at the Bannock Burn Bridge near Sauchie Craig to an elevation of 162 m (531 ft) at a point which overlooks the former quarrying operation to the west and Stirling Castle to the east. The hill lies north of the Bannock Burn, northeast of Sauchie Craig (an area designated SSSI, Site of Special Scientific Interest), east of the Touch Hills and Murrayswood, south of Cambusbarron, and west of Stirling and the M9.

Gillies Hill is the hill from which Robert the Bruce’s camp followers, or Gillies, descended onto the field of the Battle of Bannockburn in 1314 turning the tide of the battle which granted Scotland nearly 400 years of independence. The majority of Gillies Hill has been classified as a Semi-natural Ancient Woodland by The Woodland Trust using aerial surveys and by a follow-up Phase 1 habitat survey conducted in 2010. To date 21 Scotland & 38 United Kingdom ancient woodland indicator species have been documented on the hill demonstrating that the woodland's understory and sections of its tree cover have been cloaked in woodland for centuries; the earliest mapped confirmation of trees on the site dates back to the 1580s Pont map.

== History ==
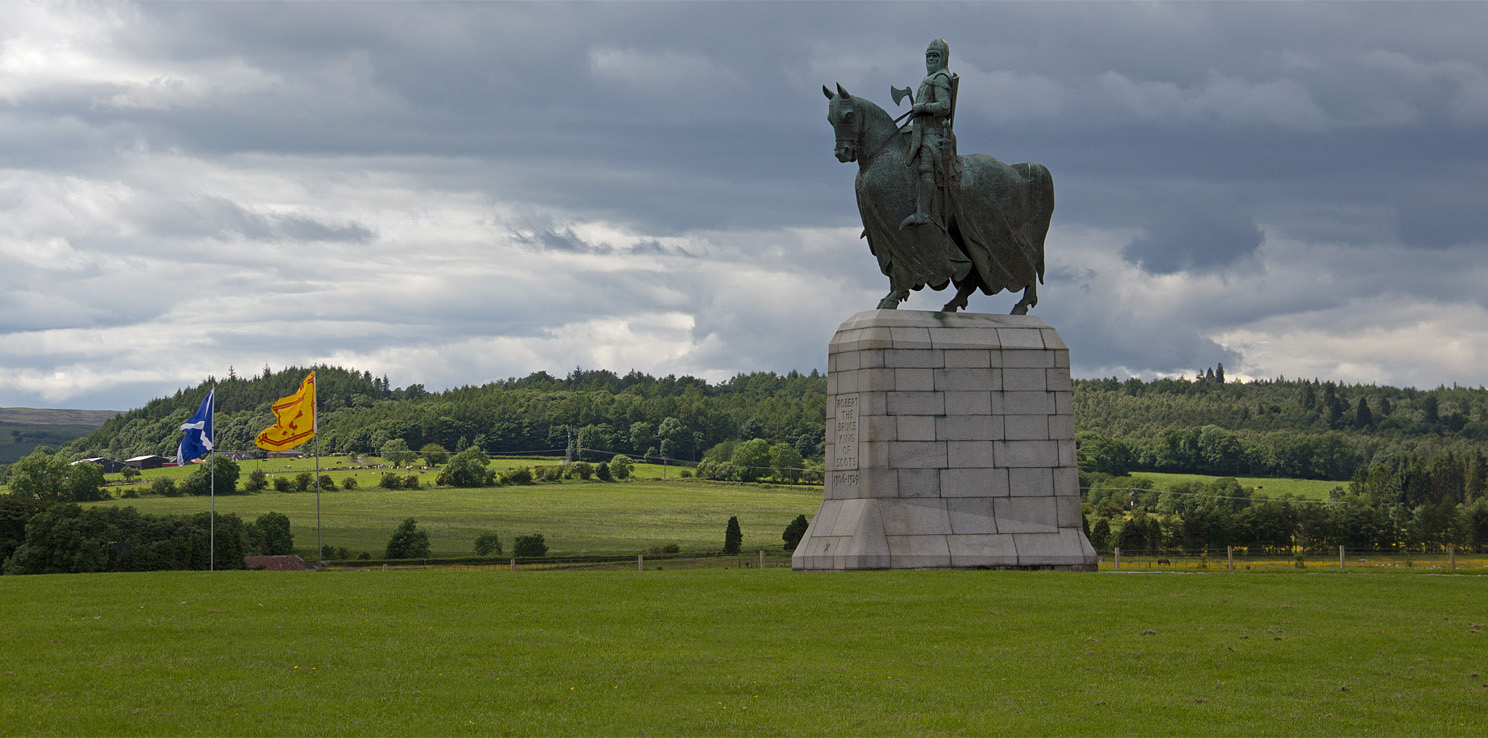
Statue of Robert the Bruce at Bannockburn with Gillies Hill in the background.

From ancient times to the present Gillies Hill has been inhabited, enhanced and used by multiple generations.

=== Prehistory ===
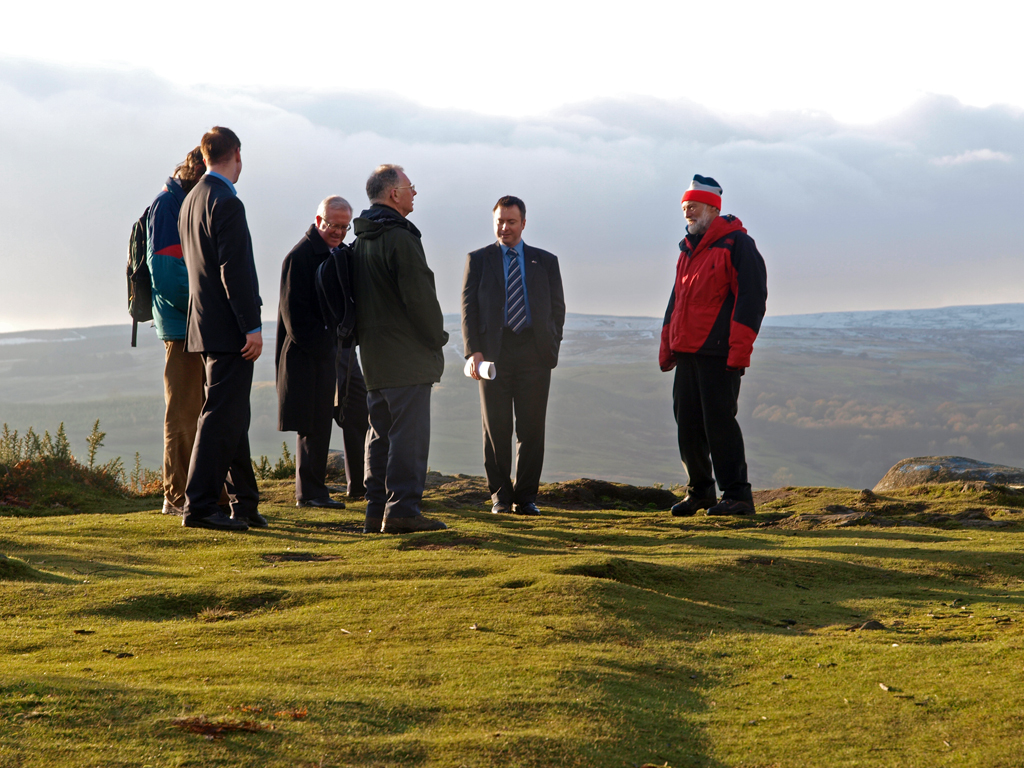
Site of Iron Age Hill Fort on Touchadam Craig

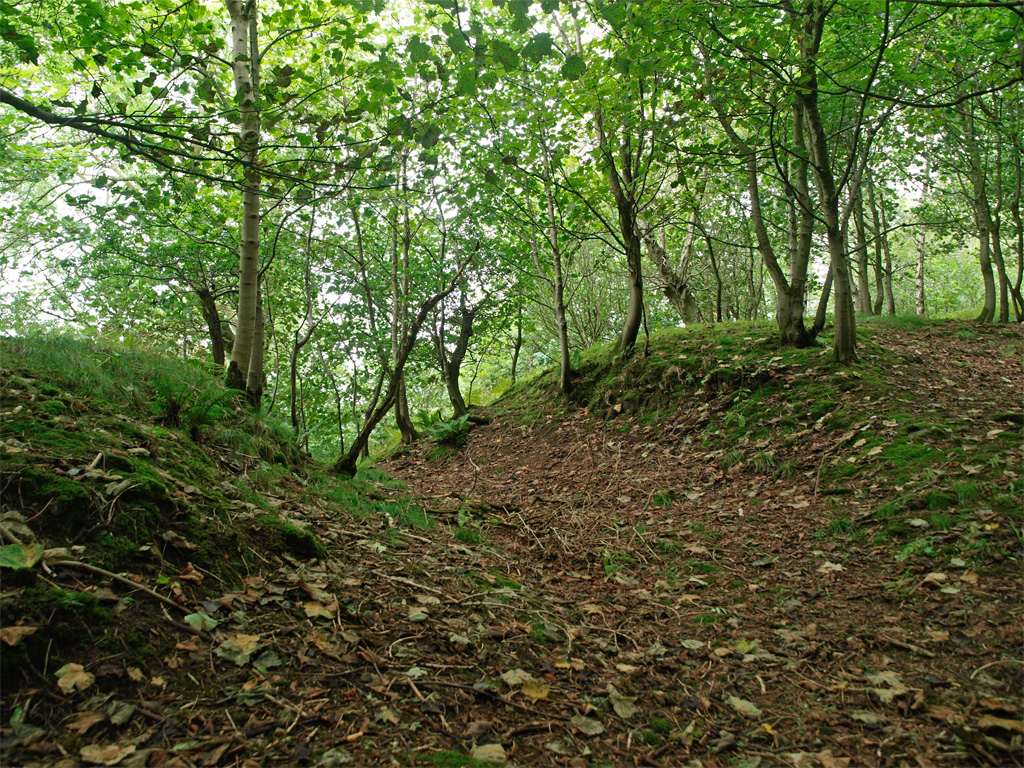
Defensive ditch of Iron Age Wallstale Dun on the south end of Gillies Hill

The earliest known structures on Gillies Hill were built by Iron Age people over 2000 years ago. Two structures are known, what is currently called Wallstale Dun on the southern end of Touchadam Craig and Gillies Hill fort on the northwest end of the craig. From both the dun and the fort the countryside may be seen for miles providing line-of-sight connections to other duns and forts (Touch Muir's Castlehill Duns, the Baston Burn Duns, Wester Craigend Dun, etc.).

In 1984 a trial trench was opened at Gillies Hill fort across the defences in the south sector. Three stone faced ramparts were explored - material for the construction of the rampart had been obtained by surface quarrying of the surrounding area. Within the fort was a layer of occupation debris containing pottery, including the upper half of a decorated vessel with more cultural material recovered from within the ramparts. This material, along with radiometric dates, suggests activity from the Late Neolithic/Early Bronze Age and the Iron Age – the presumption being that the ramparts derive from the later, Iron Age activity. The nature of the earlier Late Neolithic/Early Bronze Age activity on the hill remains uncertain.

=== Bannockburn, 23 to 24 June 1314 ===
The name "Gillies Hill" may come from the tale of Robert the Bruce's camp-followers, who before the second day of the battle were ordered to wait in the safety of forest cover within sight the battle. According to John Barbour, an early Scottish poet writing in 1375, these "sma’ folk" were called down by The Bruce from the Borestone where he had raised his standard, late on the second day of the battle at a crucial stage. The sma' folk descended the slopes of a hill yelling, banging pots and pans, and waiving pieces of clothing in the air at which point the English troops thinking the newcomers were reinforcements, fled. Barbour does not mention any hill by name, hence the attribution of this event to Gillies Hill is uncertain. Modern historical analysis most commonly proposes Coxet Hill, adjacent to St Ninians, as the location of the events Barbour describes.

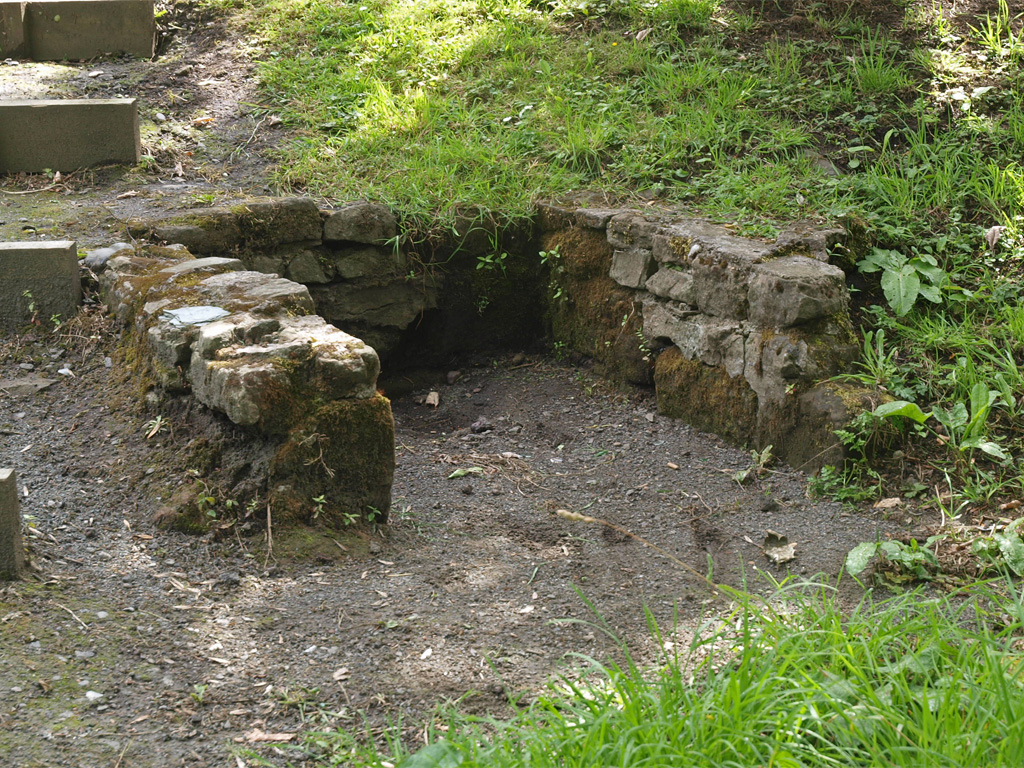
Bruce's Well, Cambusbarron

=== Bruce’s Well ===
According to Peter Paterson, Cambusbarron historian, on the day before the Battle of Bannockburn Robert the Bruce came to Cambusbarron Chapel to take the sacrament and to drink from the Chapel Well, formerly known as Christ's Well, and currently known as Bruce's Well. Water from the well was sprinkled on the field of Bannockburn before the battle. A granite block donated by Stirling Stone with a plaque inscribed by Scotia Granite, was placed at the site of Bruce's Well to commemorate its role in the battle for the 700th anniversary in 2014. In 2022 a new footbridge was built from the footpath to the site.

=== Bonnety Tree ===
The cliff edges of the northwest side of Gillies Hill, known as Touchadam Craig, are the habitat of several dozen ancient Scots pines. One of these pines that has since fallen to the expansion of the Murrayshall Quarry, was known as the Bonnety Tree and is said to have been the tree upon which the Gillies hung their bonnets before their descent onto the battlefield. In 2016 a new "Bonnety Tree" was planted on the southern end of the hill with the cooperation of the Ogilvie Group.

=== Polmaise Castle ===
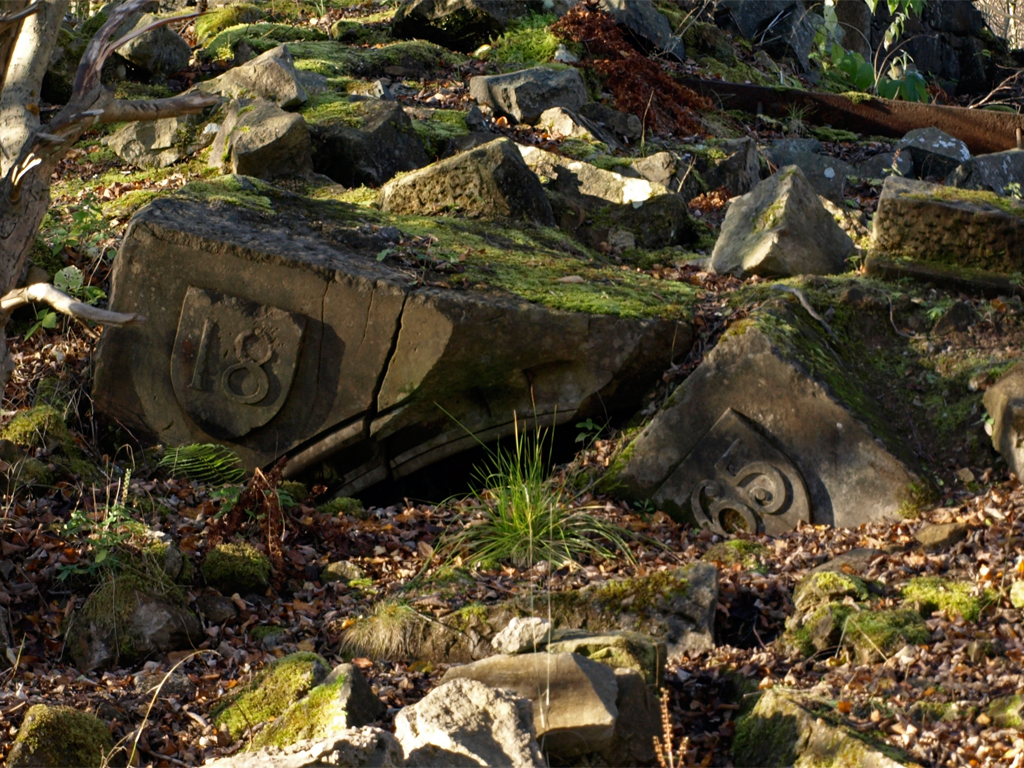
Former main entrance date stone in the ruins of Polmaise Castle, Gillies Hill.

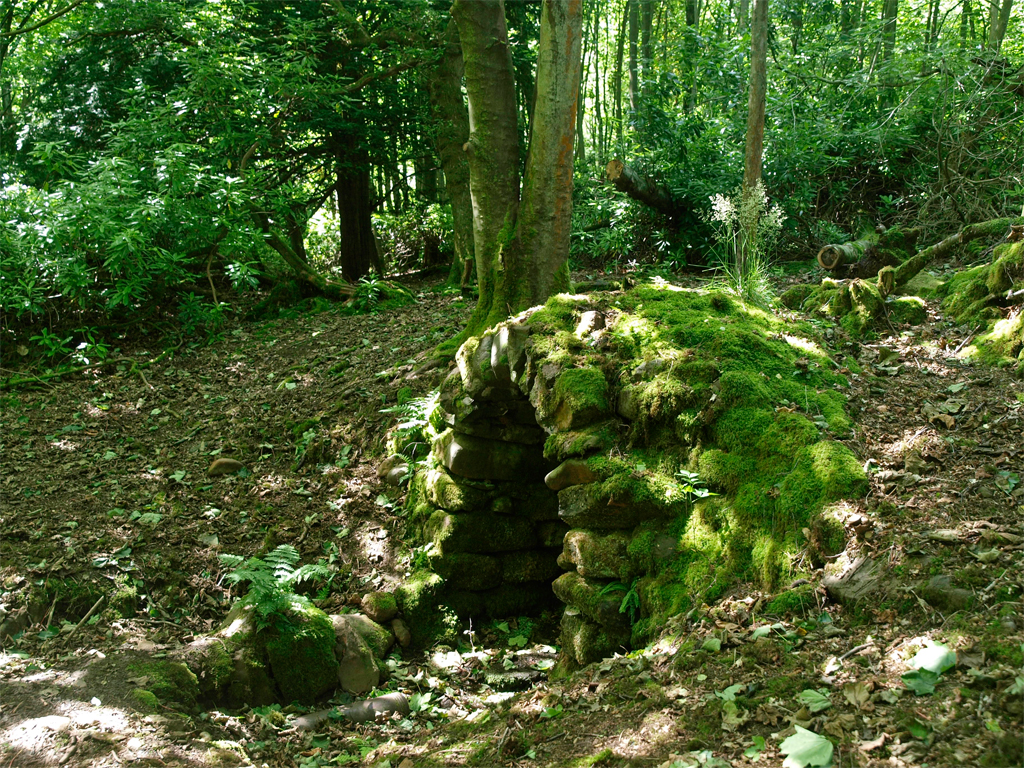
Polmaise Castle spring, Gillies Hill.

The ruined Polmaise Castle set in the middle of Gillies Hill was built for £30,000 by Col. John Murray, 23rd Laird of Touchadam and Polmaise, upon his return from the Crimean War. Murray commissioned David Burn to design the Scots Baronial mansion in 1865. The building was demolished in 1966 long after the death of the Murray's only son and heir in The Great War. The original Murray house was known as Touchadam Castle which was located to the west of Gillies Hill near Gartur. Only its ruins remain today. In 1673 Murrays Hall located beneath the western craig of Gillies Hill was built as a gift from the Laird to his son. It was eventually occupied by Jacobite Ladies of Murrayshall. These three maiden ladies who lived their entire lives in Murrays Hall were regionally known for their hospitality and kindness to those of all walks of life. Perhaps the most colorful of their stories involves loyalty to the Jacobite cause; the ladies would discreetly end each meal with either a verbal toast "To Him over the water," or by a delicate movement of the glass over the pitcher of water on the table if more discretion were required. The last of the Jacobite Ladies died in 1829, at which point Murrays Hall became a farmhouse lasting until it was destroyed in its entirety by 20th Century quarry operations.

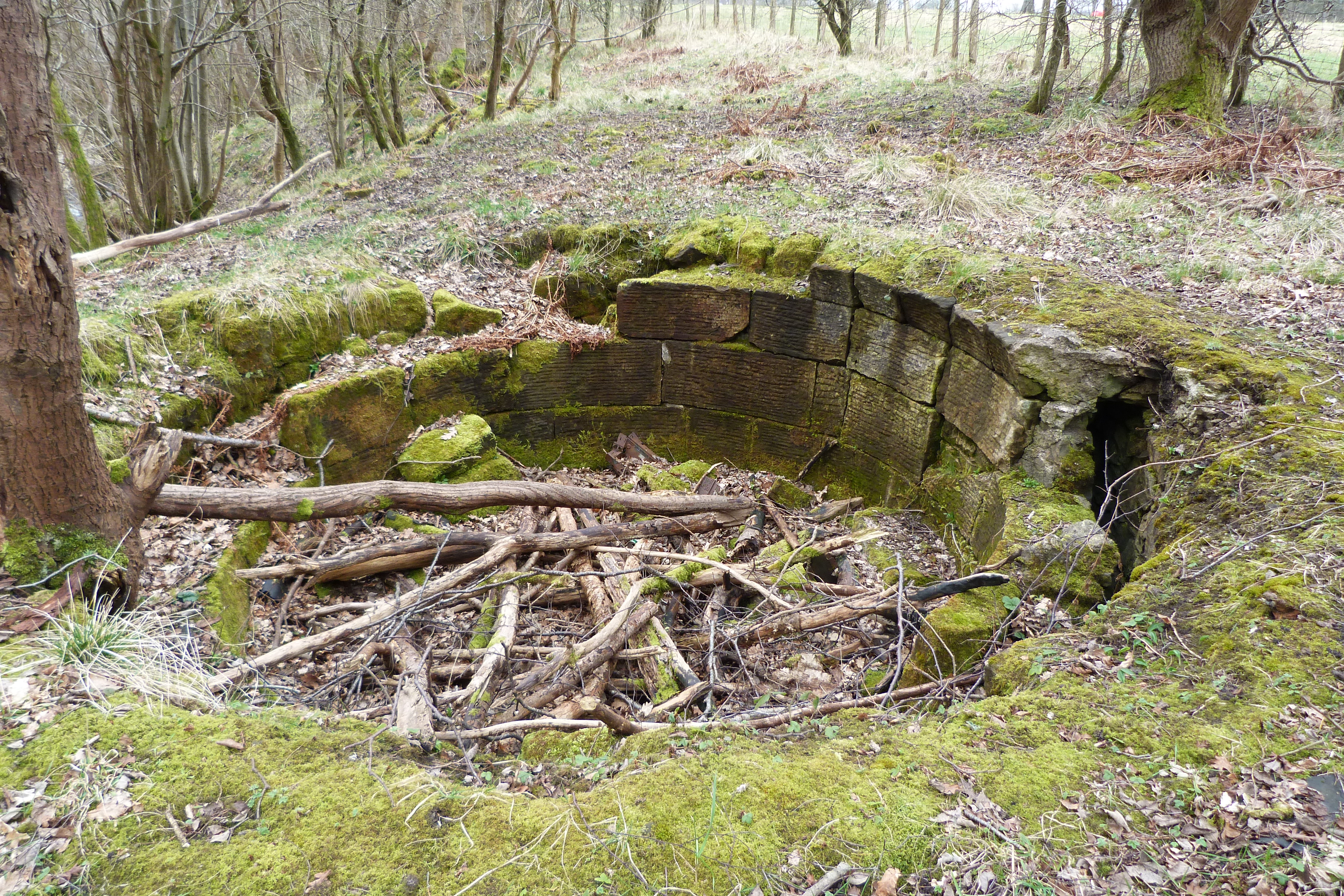
The Old Polmiase Icehouse.

Another family home was Old or East Polmaise House near Fallin which was demolished in the 20th century but which has bee subject to recent excavations by Dr Murray Cook. One of the remaining features is the 18th century ice house.

=== Free Green ===
The Old Drove Road whose old name of The Commondry leads to what was once Cambusbarron's Free Green, located near the current gate to the quarry. In the past it was here that villagers and drovers gathered to tether their stock. Up until 1953 it was also used for celebration bonfires for special events.

== Landscape interest - Viewshed ==
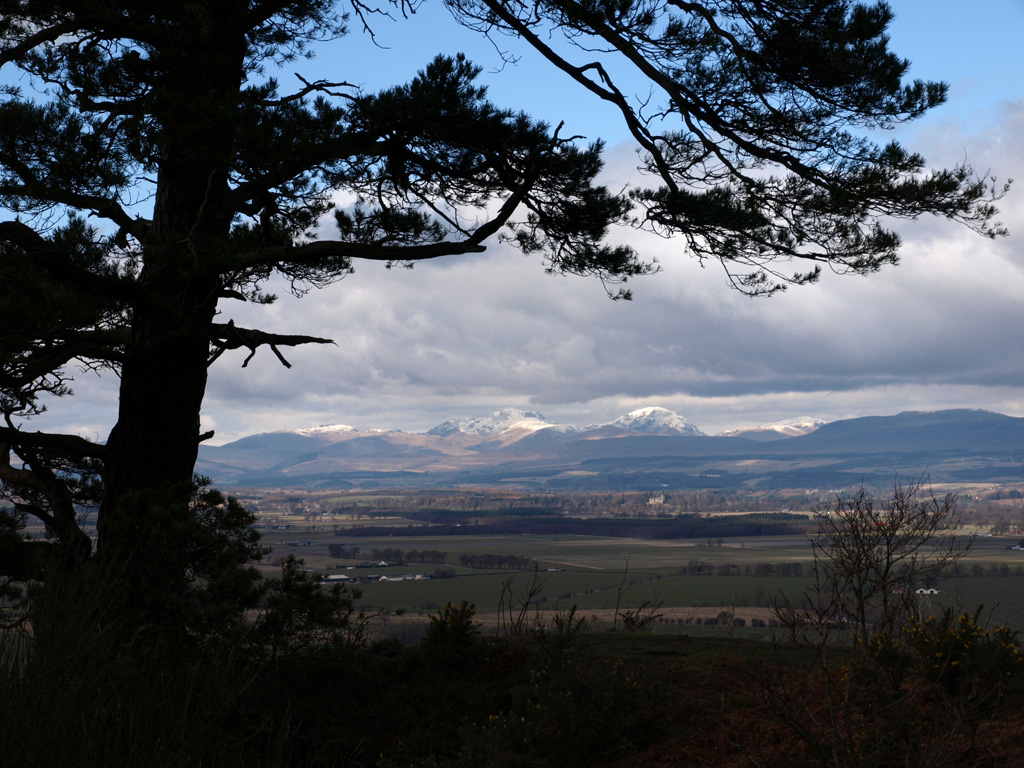
The view from the top of Gillies Hill, Scotland, to the northwest

Gillies Hill has views in all directions being an AGLV, Area of Great Landscape Value, an area "identified as being of scenic importance." From the west Gillies Hill is the first hill to be seen from Stirling Castle. The hill flanks the western side of the M9 motorway just as the iconic structures of Castle Craig and Abbey Craig flank the east. The view from the Hill Fort of Gillies Hill to the west and north includes the Touch Hills, Touch Hills Wind Farm, the Carse of Stirling, and the Southern Highlands including Ben Ledi, Ben Vorlich and Stùc a' Chroin. The view to the east includes Stirling Castle, Abbey Craig and the Wallace Monument; and the Ochils. The view to the south looks out over the Bannockburn Heritage Centre with its statue of Robert the Bruce and the Rotunda Memorial.

== Recreation ==
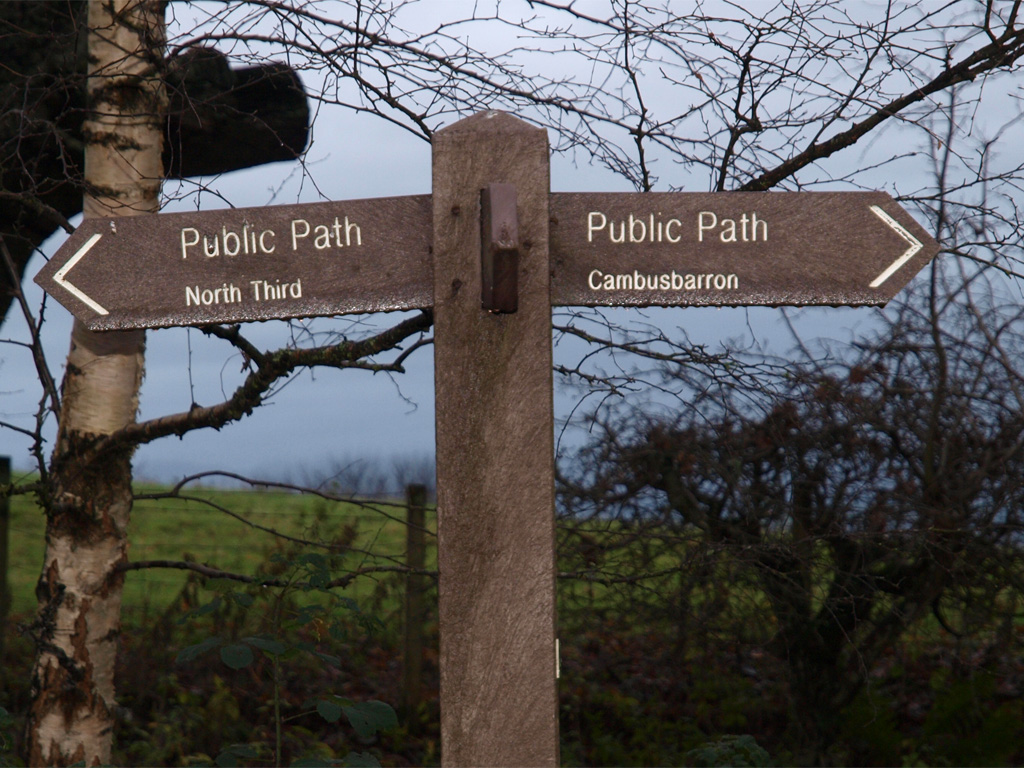
Public path signs

The grounds of Gillies Hill have been used by walkers, joggers, birdwatchers, bicyclists and botanists for decades. Geocachers from all over the world come to find geocaches hidden on the hill and in its immediate vicinity. Paths on the hill range from relatively easy rambles to more strenuous hikes. In the Winter paths can get slippery and muddy. Among the most popular walks are the Quarry Walk, the Lake Walk, the Tree Tour and the Public Trail that leads west through Murray's Wood to the Bannock Burn. In addition to these trails, are sheer rock faces popular among skilled rock climbers who can access route guides on the internet. Downhill bicycle racers and stunt cyclists have established demanding circuits and jump parks also described on the internet. A car park is located at the end of Old Drove Road in Cambusbarron where the Cambusbarron Community Council's series of three informational brochures and maps are available: Flora and Fauna, The History, and Things to Do (Recreation). There is also room to park to the southwest of the hill at the small Bannock Burn crossing at N 56° 05.614 W 003° 58.643 and at the south end of the hill in the wide opening of the access road at N 56° 05.842 W 003° 57.762. Gillies Hill may also be accessed by a wide trail entrance in the Gillies Hill neighborhood of Cambusbarron at N 56° 06.398 W 003° 58.077.

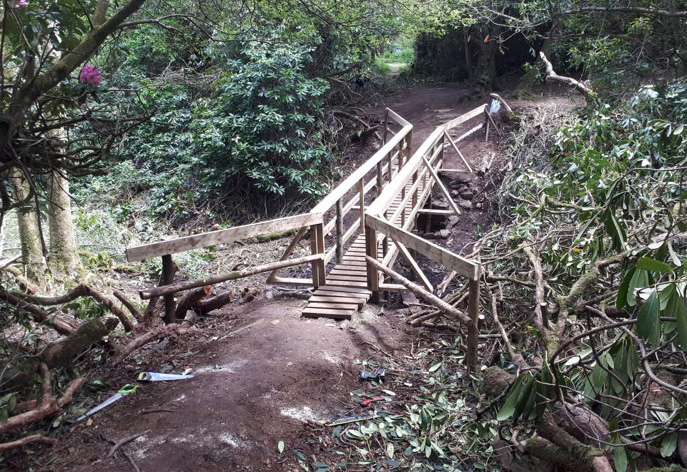
The new bridge near Polmaise Castle ruins built by volunteers.

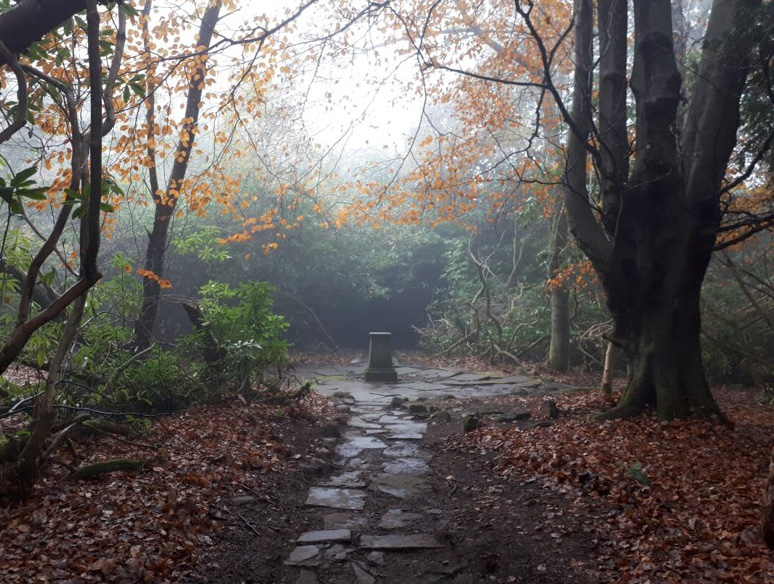
Volunteer renovation of the Polmaise Castle gardens.

== Gillies Hill Community Woodland ==
After many years of work and negotiations by Cambusbarron Community Development Trust, 64 hectares on the eastern half of Gillies Hill was brought into community ownership in August 2019 to enhance its use for walking, exploring, mountain biking, horse riding, orienteering and generally exploring to appreciate the nature and wildlife of the area. Since then, a Community Forest Manager has been hired to manage logging, clear invasive species, and re-establish natural woodland and heritage orchards. Additionally, many volunteers have worked on restoring the grounds of the ruined Polmaise Castle garden, tennis courts, curling ponds, installing benches, picnic tables and paths; as well as giving guided walks around the hill.

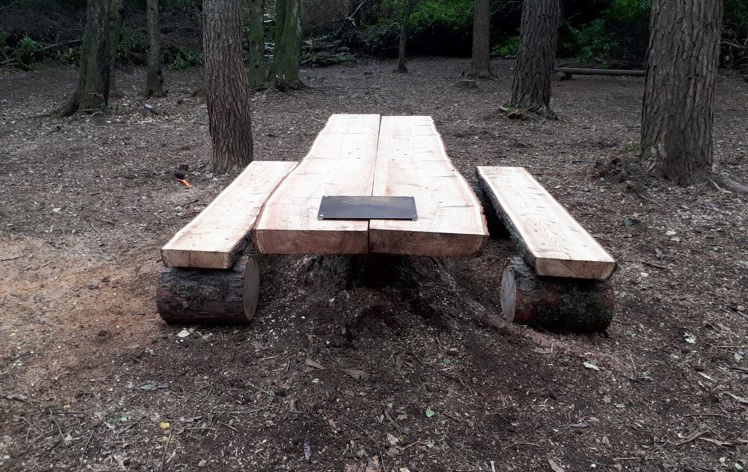
Volunteer created picnic area on the site of the old tennis courts.

== Environmental information - Physical ==
=== Climate ===
The weather of Gillies Hill is predominantly influenced by air currents from the Atlantic Ocean with a prevailing south-westerly wind. Winters are wet and windy. The area has an annual average rainfall amount of 1,060 mm (42 in) and an annual average mean temperature of 8.8–9.3 °C (47.8–48.7 °F). (1971 to 2000: Met Office, UK)

=== Hydrology ===
The site is bordered on the south by the Bannock Burn which joins the River Forth at N 56° 07.250 W 003° 52.835 which flows east to the North Sea; and on the north and northwest by several small tributaries which flow into the Forth: The Baston Burn, the Touch Burn, Johnny's Burn, and the Glenmoray-Raploch Burn which runs through Cambusbarron passing the site of Bruce's Well. To the west the Bannock Burn is contained by North Third Reservoir.

=== Geology and topography ===
The hill is one of a series of parallel "crag and tail" formations (including Abbey Craig, Stirling Castle, Kings Park, and Sauchie Craig) that march across the Carse of Stirling between the Touch Hills and the Ochil Hills. These formations were created by the movement of glaciers over the carse shaping the more resistant (usually volcanic) plugs into cliff-like crags ("craig" in Scots) with trailing wakes of softer material called "tails."

Gillies Hill is located in Central Scotland east of the city of Stirling and south of the town of Cambusbarron within the Bannock Burn and River Forth watersheds. A crag and tail formation, the hill rises gradually from an altitude of approximately 79 meters at the Bannock Burn Bridge at Sauchie Craig on its southern end to drop off in a series of crags (cliffs) - some natural, some the result of quarrying - at its northwest end at an approximate altitude of 160 meters.

The underlying geology of Gillies Hill is a layer of quartz-dolerite approximately 100 meters thick of the Late Carboniferous tholeiitic Midland Valley Sill-complex (Stirling Sill). The hill is one of a series of crag and tail formations that cross the Carse of Stirling separated by faults into distinct hills such as Abbey Craig, Kings Park, Sauchieburn and Stirling Castle rock. These crag and tail formations were created by glaciation that terminated about 10,000 years ago.

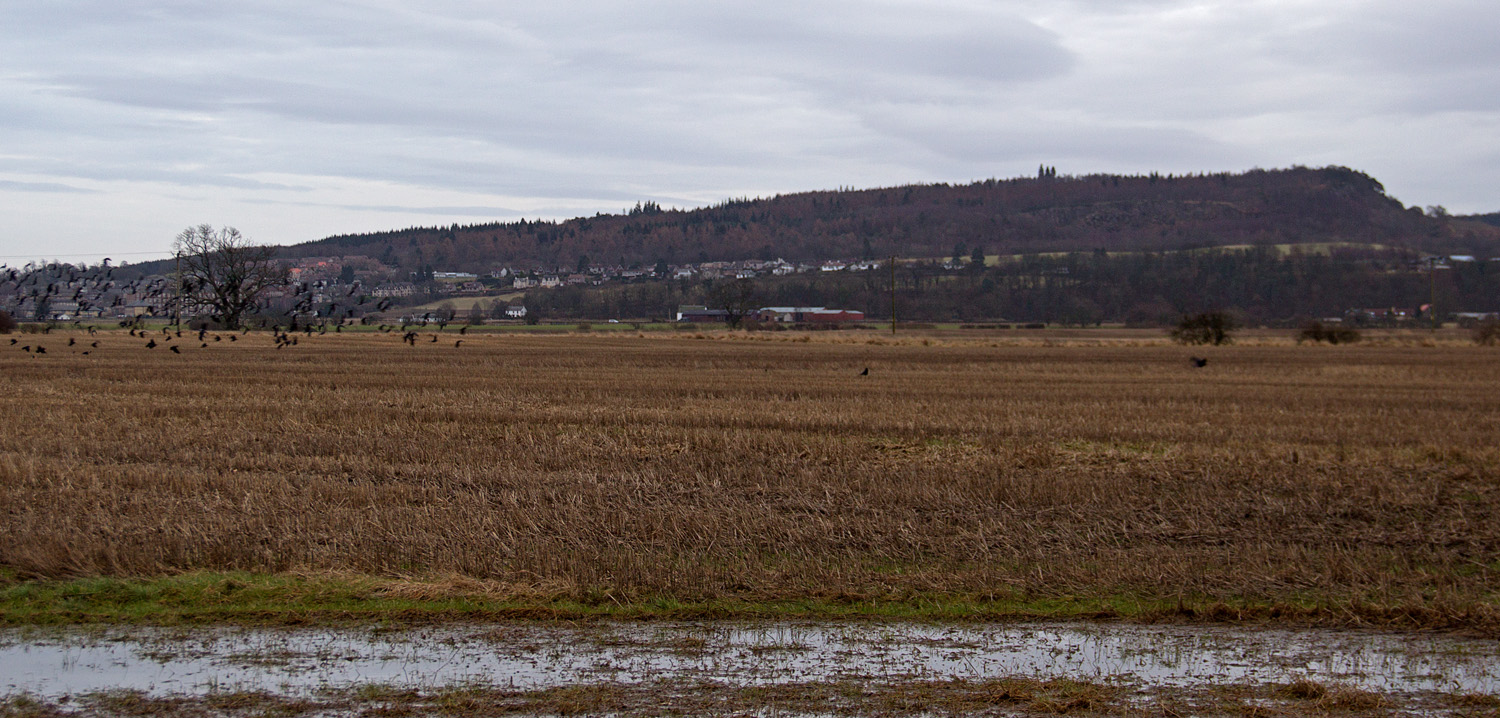
Gillies Hill Winter 2013 Craig and Tail

The quartz-dolerite of the hill, highly resistance to erosion, is a ready source of "whin-stone" for road beds and sea walls; concrete aggregate and kerbstones. Several whinstone mines have operated on Gillies Hill over the years. Beneath the hill's quartz-dolerite layer is a layer of Murrayshall Limestone.

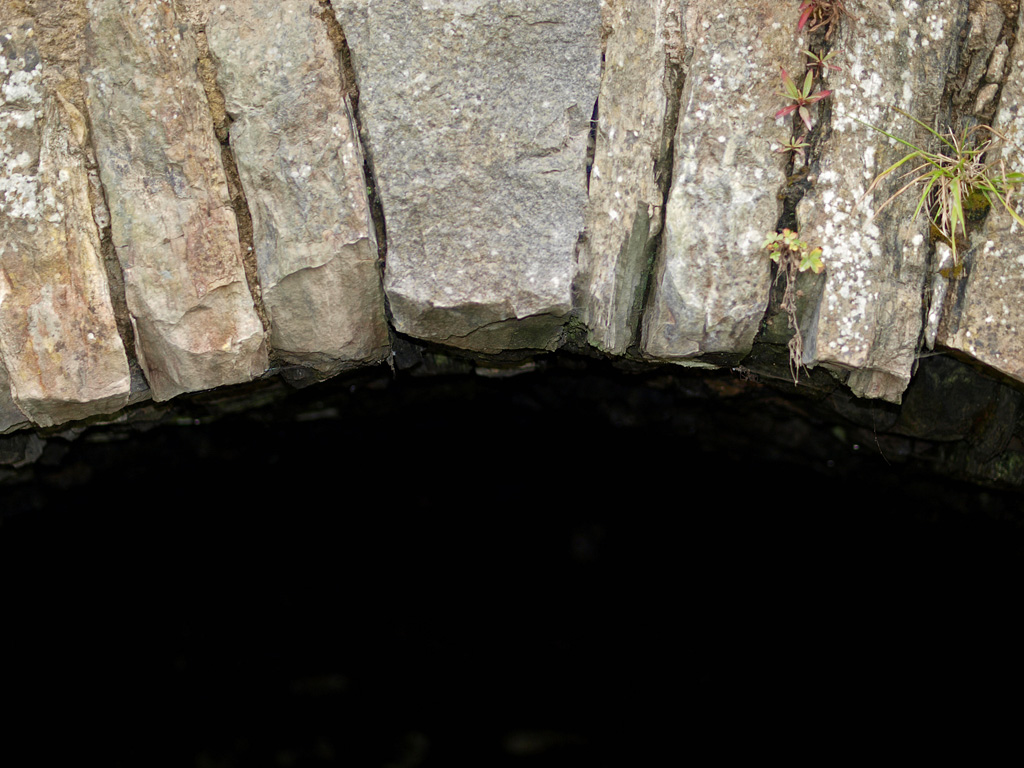
Murrayshall Lime Kilns

There is evidence that the limekilns in the area have been in production from about 1790 into the 20th Century, producing lime to be used in building mortars, iron production and agriculture. The limestone, calcium carbonate, was roasted with coal in the Murrayshall, Craigend, and Cambusbarron kilns (respectively: at the south end of Gillies Hill, eastward up the Bannock Burn and north of Cambusbarron) to produce calcium oxide (quicklime), followed by the production of calcium hydroxide in slaking pits - and was then spread on agricultural fields.

The remains of the kilns can be found at three locations around Gillies Hill: at Murrayshall Limeworks on the SW of Gillies Hill beside the entrance to the current quarry; at Hollandbush Limeworks off Kersebonny Road and at Craigend Limeworks on the south bank of the Bannock Burn near Castlehill Dun. Extensive tunnels lie beneath Gillies Hill; the mine adit is located in Cambusbarron and the mine air shaft is on the hill itself.

== Environmental information - Biological ==
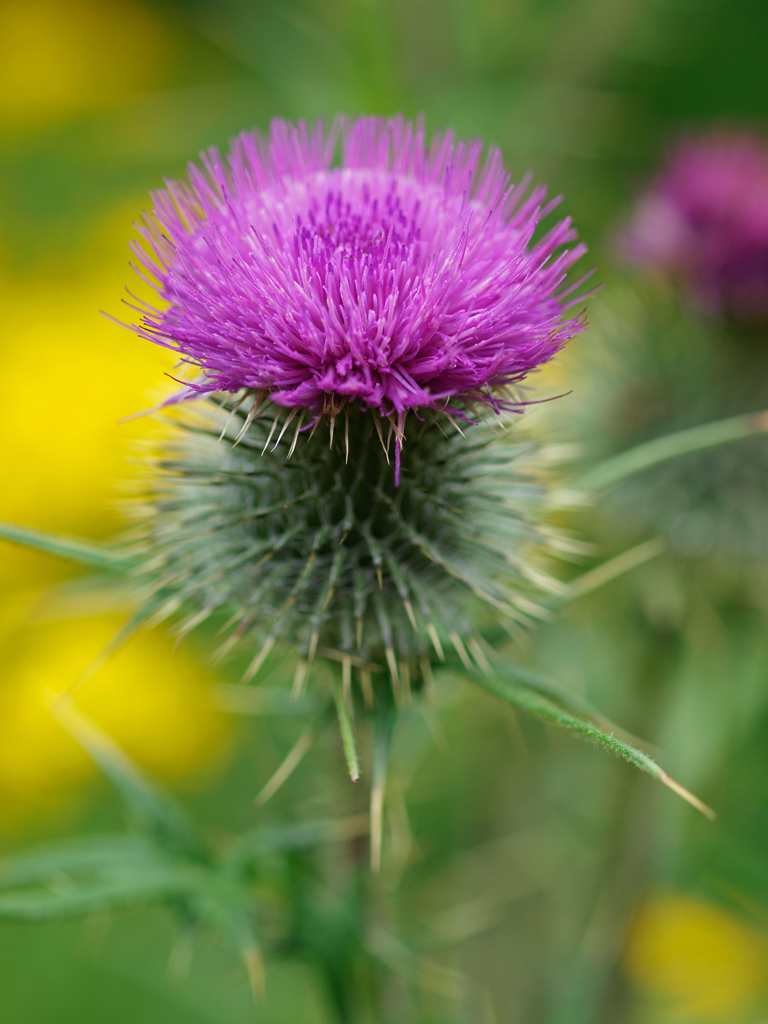
Spear thistle - Cirsium vulgare

=== Habitats ===
Gillies Hill displays a considerable diversity of habitats from Scots pine/heath to semi-natural woodland of ash, oak and rowan.

The following are the habitat divisions of the hill as classified in a Phase 1 habitat survey conducted in 2010: Broadleaved semi-natural woodland, Broadleaved plantation woodland, Coniferous plantation woodland, Mixed semi-natural woodland, Dense continuous scrub, Scattered scrub, Recently felled coniferous woodland, Semi-natural neutral grassland, Marshy grassland, Continuous Bracken, Standing water, Running water, and Rock exposure & waste/quarry. Dominant species found on Gillies Hill include sycamore, birch, broom, common ash, beech, larch, bracken, spruce, oak and willow.

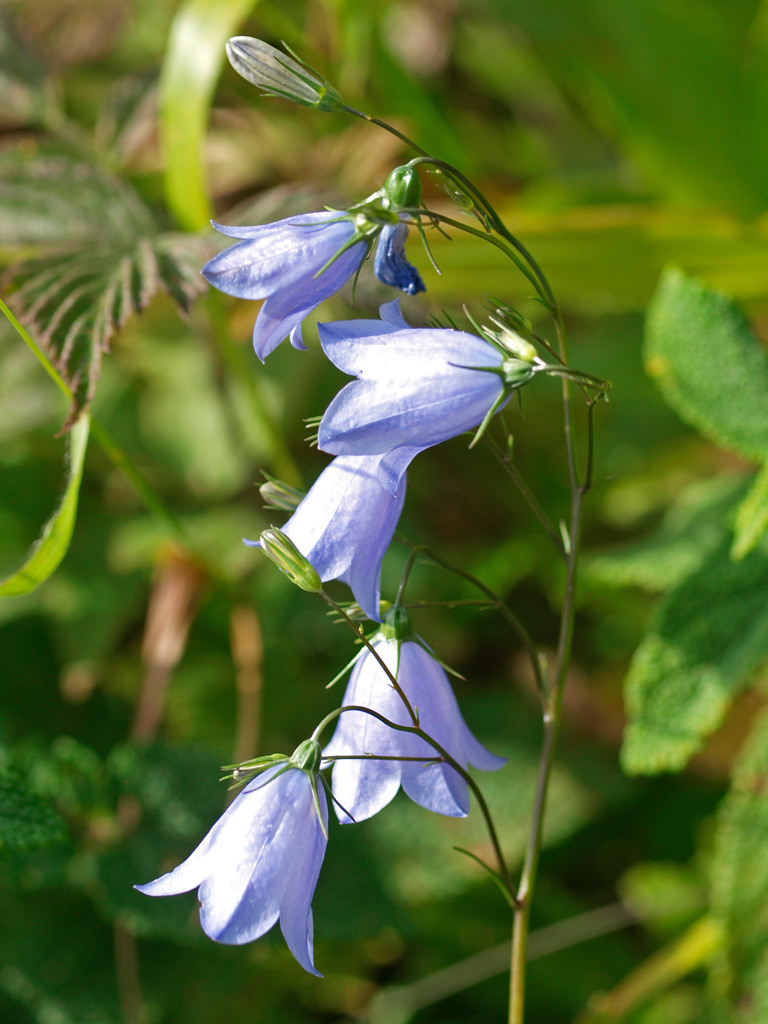
Scottish bluebells or harebells - Campanula rotundifolia

=== Flora ===
Gillies Hill hosts a large array of plants native to Central Scotland. The hill is home to at least 38 Ancient Woodland indicator species from the AWVP – Europe/National/Scotland list and 21 from the AWVP - Scotland list, a record Scots Pine, a record Rowan, and an abundance of wildflower, lichen, fungi, moss, and grass species. Eight of the top ten Scottish plants listed on the Scottish Biodiversity List (a list of flora, fauna and habitats considered by Scottish Ministers to be of principal importance for biodiversity) as most popular among Scots can be found on Gillies Hill: common and bell heather, Scottish bluebell or harebell, Scots Pine, oak, thistle, rowan, ferns, and common spotted and Northern marsh orchids. Three of these including the heather, harebell, and Scots pine are predominantly found on the hill's heath out-crops which are threatened by quarry expansion, as is the only known population of blaeberry on the hill.

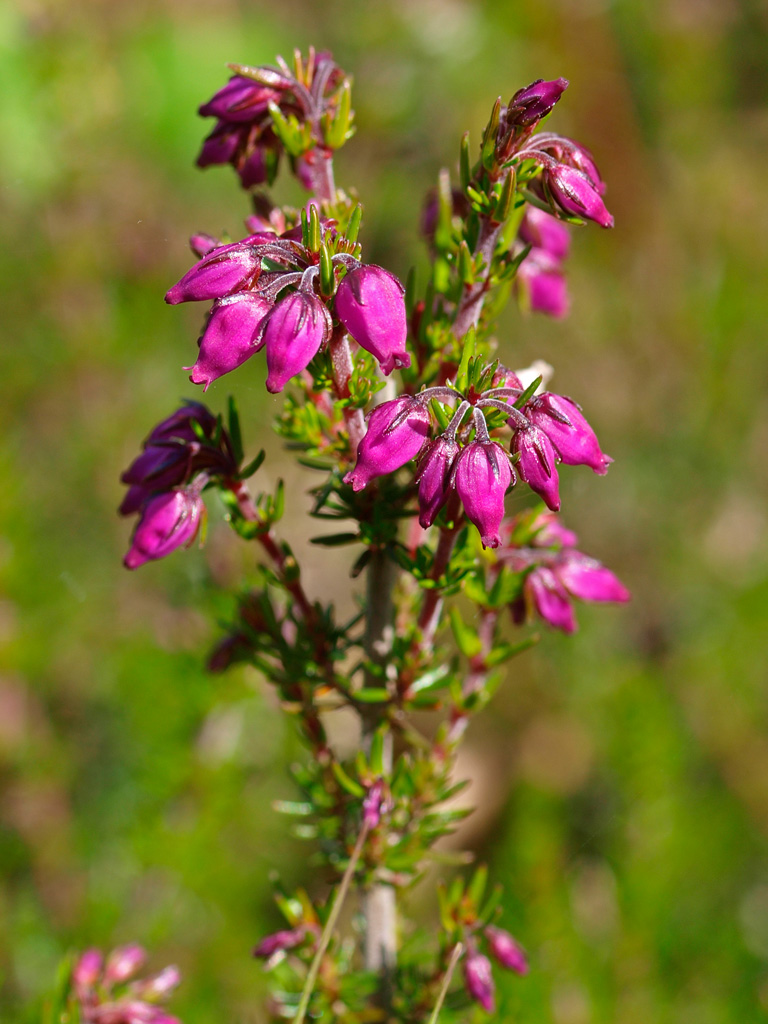
Bell heather - Erica cinerea

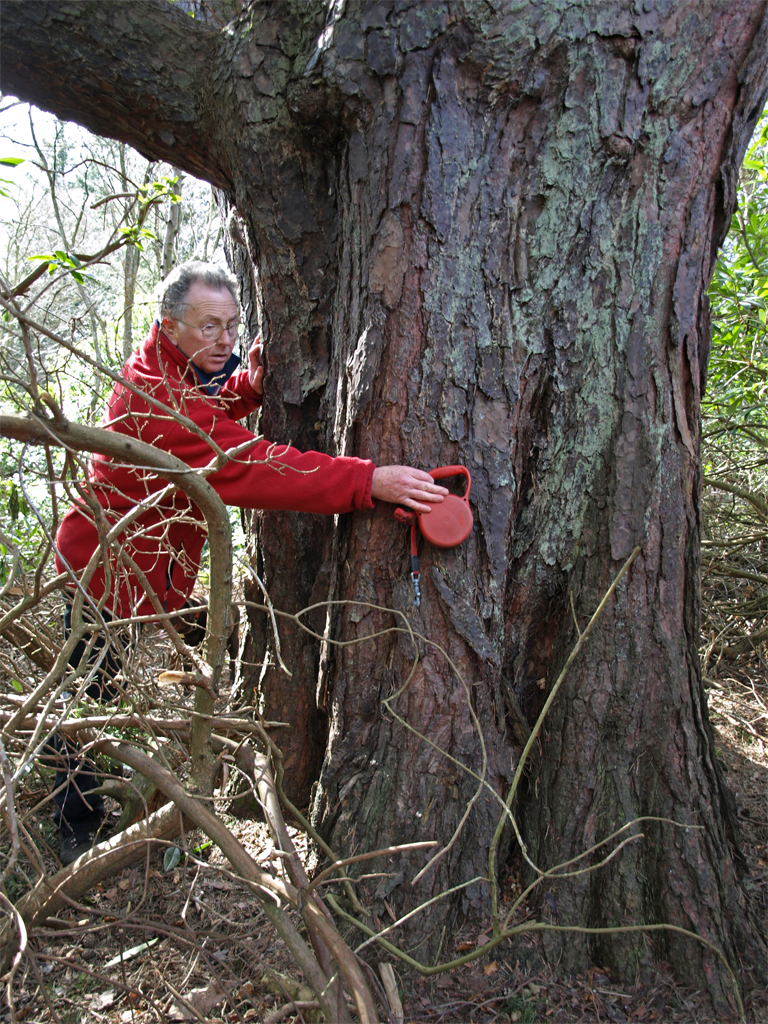
Scots pine - Pinus sylvestris

==== Semi-natural Ancient Woodland ====
Much of Gillies Hill has been classified as a Semi-natural Ancient Woodland by Woodland Trust aerial Inventories. This means that its understory of plant species has been more or less continuous for hundreds of years. Plants such as wood sorrel, common dog violets, and English bluebells most likely existed on the hill at the time of Robert the Bruce, and perhaps as far back as Iron Age Scotland. Areas of the hill which have been re-planted or coppiced (pruned to supply long thin sprouts) or harvested for timber, may still have relatively undisturbed underlying vegetation containing species which take years to become established residents of the forest.

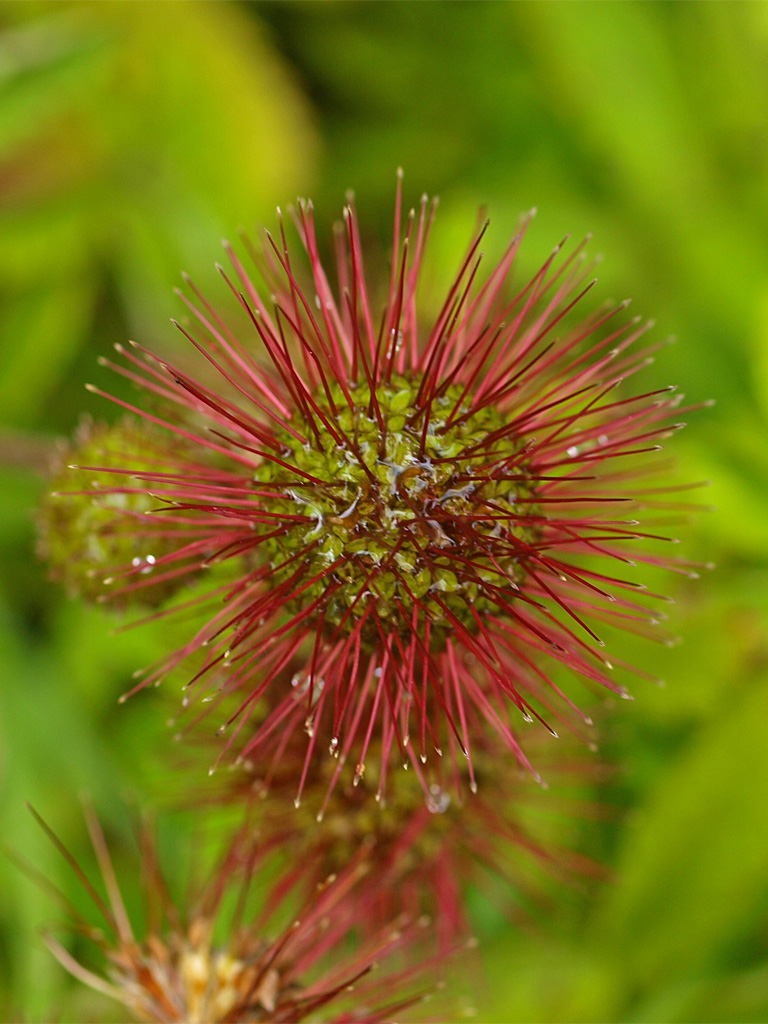
Two-spined pirri-pirri burr - Acaena ovalifolia

==== Record and Veteran trees ====
Gillies Hill is home to many fine specimens of both broadleaf and coniferous trees, but two in particular stand out: a Scots pine nicknamed "The Big Pine," which has a girth of over 5.5 meters which makes it the fifth largest pine of this species in Britain – and the largest south of Perthshire; and a coppiced rowan of immense lower girth. These two trees, plus 16 additional trees on Gillies Hill are currently listed as Veteran Trees with the Woodland Trust's Ancient Tree Hunt Project. Also worth visiting is a row of massive, hollow but living, Sycamores that line the old road to the former site of Murrayshall west of the quarry.

The Scots pines found along the western cliff (Touchadam Craig) of Gillies Hill are relicts of an ancient pinewood supported by presence of the fungal species Russula integra var. integra. This ten hectare section of the hill extends from the old quarries in the north to Wallstale Dun in the south and includes the North and South Pincers, the arms of whinstone which visually hide the more recent quarry operations. In addition to the Scots pines on Touchadam Craig, four others found elsewhere on the hill including the 5th, the 10th and the 11th largest Scots pines in the UK, are currently registered with the Woodland Trust's Ancient Tree Hunt project. These and the ~50 other pines display a significant pinewood in the Stirling Council region. Threats to the pinewood include vandalism, invasive plants (Rhododendron and Acaena) and the prospect of renewed quarrying activity. Currently the number of dead pine snags increases relative to proximity to the former quarry core.

==== Invasive species ====
Native species are currently under threat by invasive species such as Acaena ovalifolia, two-spined Acaena (sometimes called pirri-pirri burr), a small herb whose velcro-like seeds stick to whatever passes spreading the plant far and wide. In the past five years, pirri-pirri burr has spread rapidly over most of Gillies Hill out-competing such natives as dog violet, wood avens, wild strawberry and wood sorrel. One of the concerns regarding resumed quarrying of the hill is the potential for this species to be spread throughout Scotland with whinstone extracted and exported from the quarry. Rhododendron ponticum which was planted on the hill in the 19th century as a decorative shrub has spread uncontrollably, sometimes to many times the height of a person, effectively blocking sunlight from reaching the woodland species that carpet the forest floor, and creating a dark sterile understory devoid of life. Bracken, Pteridium aquilinum, has colonized several of the hill's open areas so thickly with its rhizomatous roots that few other species can compete for survival. (In the north of Scotland wild boar have recently been re-introduced in controlled environments and are successfully rooting out the bracken allowing a new generation of woodland to become established.)

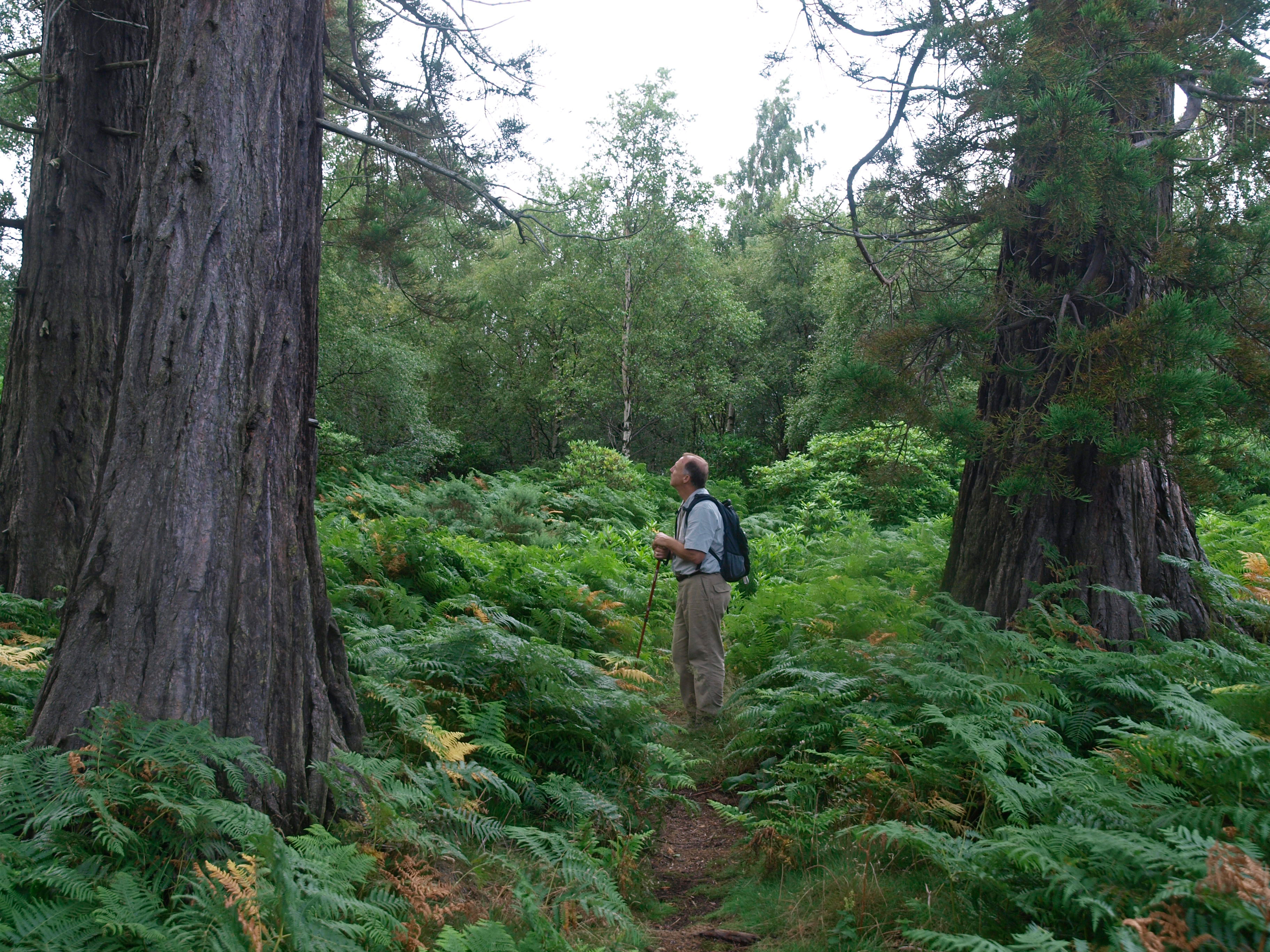
Wellingtonia - Sequoiadendron giganteum grove

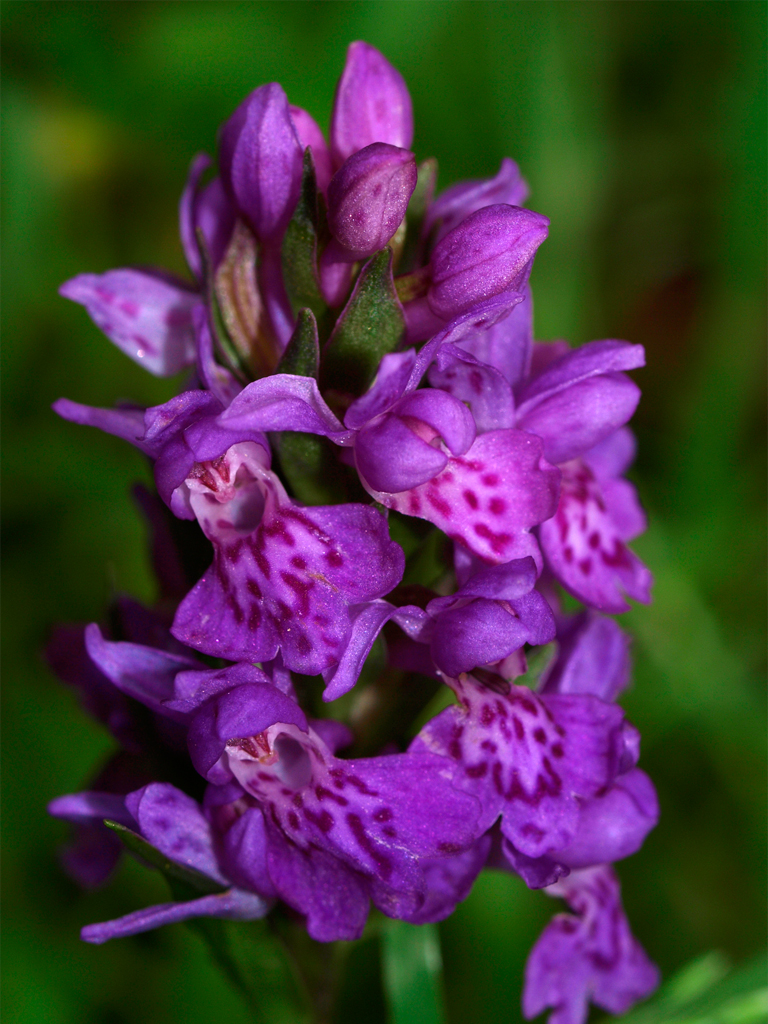
Northern Marsh Orchid - Dactylorhiza purpurella

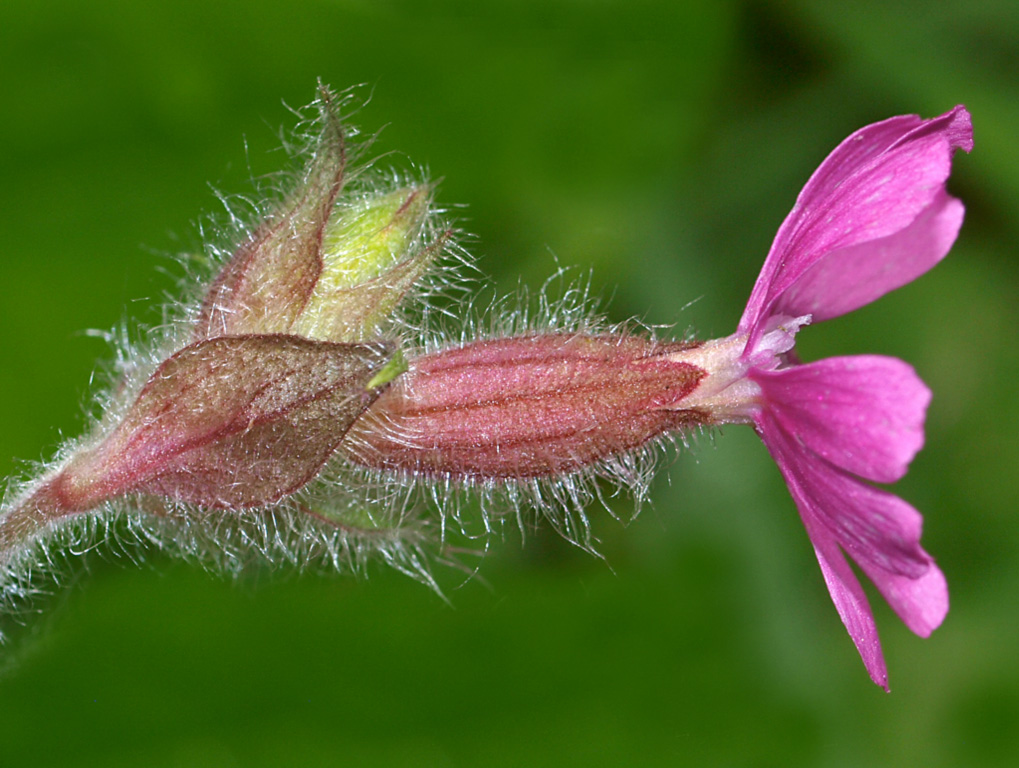
Red Campion - Silene dioica

=== Plants and History ===
The flora of Gillies Hill is intricately entwined with its history. The Murray family who built Polmaise Castle in 1865, created landscaped gardens incorporating many of the exotic coniferous trees that still grace the woodland. Like much of 19th Century British aristocracy, the Murrays were enamored with planting landscape gardens filled with newly discovered plants from around the world. Often these outdoor plant collections included tall conifers imported from North America. A fine example of this is the grove of Sierra Redwoods (or Wellingtonia), Sequoiadendron giganteum, growing at the apex of Gillies Hill. These five Redwoods were planted in the 1860s by the Murray family along the walk from the castle to the large natural loch that was once on the upper portion of Gillies Hill, but was lost to quarrying. If left undisturbed, these giants could well live over 3000 years and attain a mass of over 1400 cubic meters potentially becoming the most massive trees in Scotland. Along with others of that era, these trees may have been grown from some of the first Sequoiadendron seeds brought to Scotland by John D. Matthew in 1853 and given to his noted horticulturist father Patrick Matthew of Gourdiehill near Errol in Perth Shire who then gave many of the seedlings away to friends and family as living gifts. Unfortunately, the five redwoods on the top of Gillies Hill are within the quarry zone. Efforts are currently being made to try to save the grove.

The woodland that surrounds the Grotto or "Secret Spring" of Polmaise Castle supports a number of woodland species such as wood anemones, wood sorrel and bluebells. In the area around the Grotto many towering, ‘exotic’ conifers were planted in the 1860s by the Murray family which include four Sierra Redwoods, two Coast Redwoods (which can reach over 350’ high becoming the tallest trees on Earth), Douglas-firs, and a South American Monkey-puzzle tree.

Native trees inhabiting Gillies Hill including silver birch, rowan, holly, oak, ash, hazel and clinging to the western cliffs, gnarled Scots Pine which form an essential part of this woodland ecosystem, their cones providing an excellent source of pine nuts for native Red Squirrels and Crossbills. Also found on the hill are species which were introduced by humans and have since become naturalized. These include "archaeophytes" (pre-1500) such as the Flanders Poppy and Spearmint; and "neophytes" (post-1500) such as European Beech, Sycamore, and Red Elderberry. Polmaise Castle is home to many exotic species of plant that were introduced as part of the estate's gardens and designed landscapes. To the west and south of the castle are rows of English yew trees which once formed clipped hedges enclosing stately lawns. Other trees found here include an English holly, Portugal laurels, and a magnificent copper beech. In other areas of the hill, the natural woodland has been replaced with commercial species such as Sitka and Norway Spruce, which form dense canopies limiting undergrowth; and larch, a non-native deciduous conifer, which allows sunlight to penetrate to the ground flora.

==== Wildflowers ====
As of 2013 over 200 species of flowering herbs, shrubs, trees (angiosperms), coniferous trees (gymnosperms); and rushes (Juncus) and sedges (Carex) have been inventoried on Gillies Hill. The first flowers to appear on Gillies Hill after the cold of winter are the snowdrops which surround the ruined Fir Park Cottage. In May the forest floor along Old Drove Road is carpeted with English bluebells. These bluebells, Hyacinthoides non-scripta, are commonly confused with the Scottish bluebell or harebell, Campanula rotundifolia, which blooms throughout the summer, is lighter blue in color and is usually found in the higher reaches of Gillies Hill.

==== Bryophytes ====
In addition to the more noticeable flowering plants and tall trees that cover Gillies Hill, are a host of organisms often overlooked. Mosses (also known as bryophytes) of 48 species (including 5 varieties) in 19 families grow throughout the hill. The heavily carpeted star moss (also known as "common haircap moss") population near the Wellingtonia Grove is an especially fine example of this life form. Star moss is found in forests, peat bogs, and moorland throughout the Northern Hemisphere. Liverworts (also known as marchantyphytes) of 22 species (including two varieties) in 15 families on the hill are found in abundance at the entrance to the central mine.

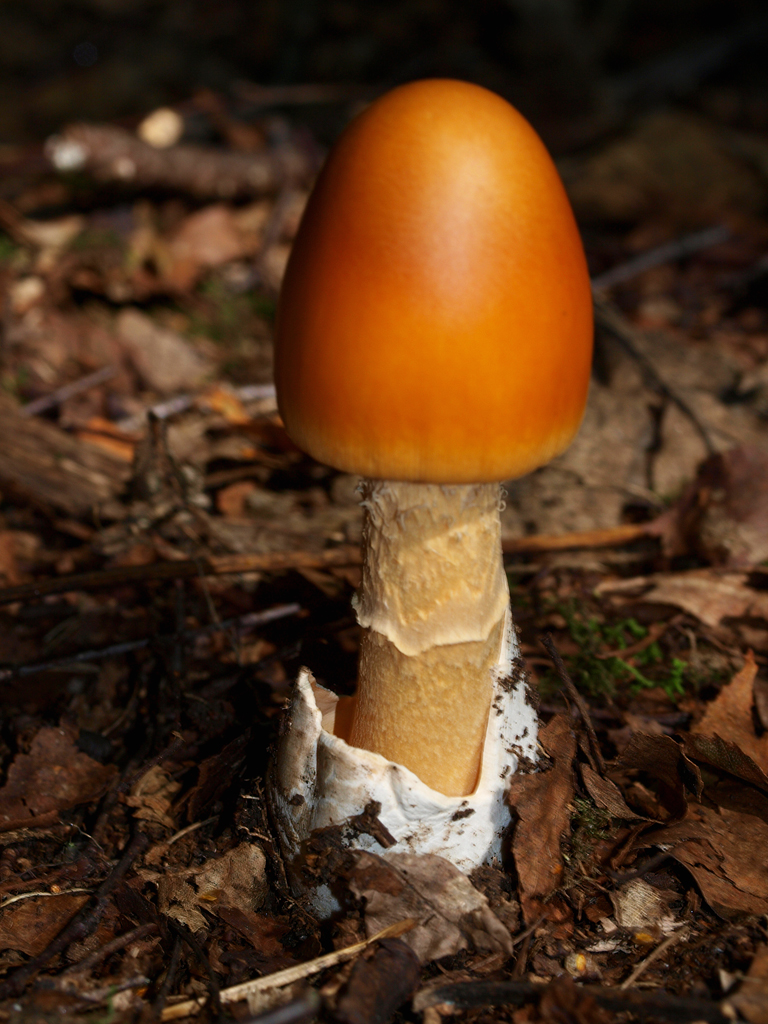
Saffron Ringless Amanita - Amanita crocea

==== Ferns, fungi, lichens, slime molds, and algae ====
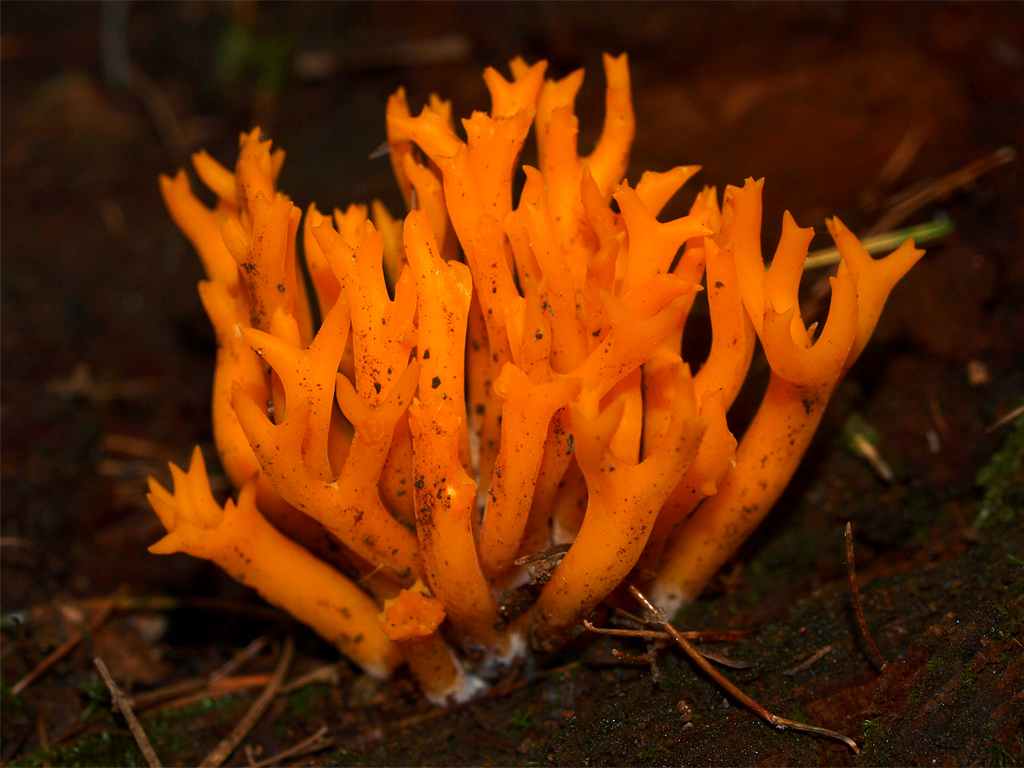
Yellow staghorn fungus - Calocera viscosa

Seven species of fern have been positively identified on Gillies Hill; however more remain to be catalogued along with dozens of species of fungi, lichen, and algae which have been photographically recorded.

Perhaps the most intriguing and perplexing organisms found on Gillies Hill are the slime moulds, whose plasmodia (masses of protoplasm) slowly moves along wood substrates engulfing particles of food in an amoeba-like manner; an example of this organism, the Red Raspberry Slime Mold, was found in late summer 2009 at the Wallstale Dun.

=== Fauna ===
Gillies Hill is populated by an array of animals both resident and migrant, most of which are native, but some of which are threatening the existence of native species.

==== Mammals ====
The woodland is home to many of Scotland's common mammal species including red and roe deer, red fox, red and Eastern grey squirrel, weasel, stoat, brown hare, European rabbit, and badger. Several mammal species on Gillies Hill are UK BAP priority species: red squirrel, brown hare, and all bats. Badgers and their setts "are comprehensively protected.".

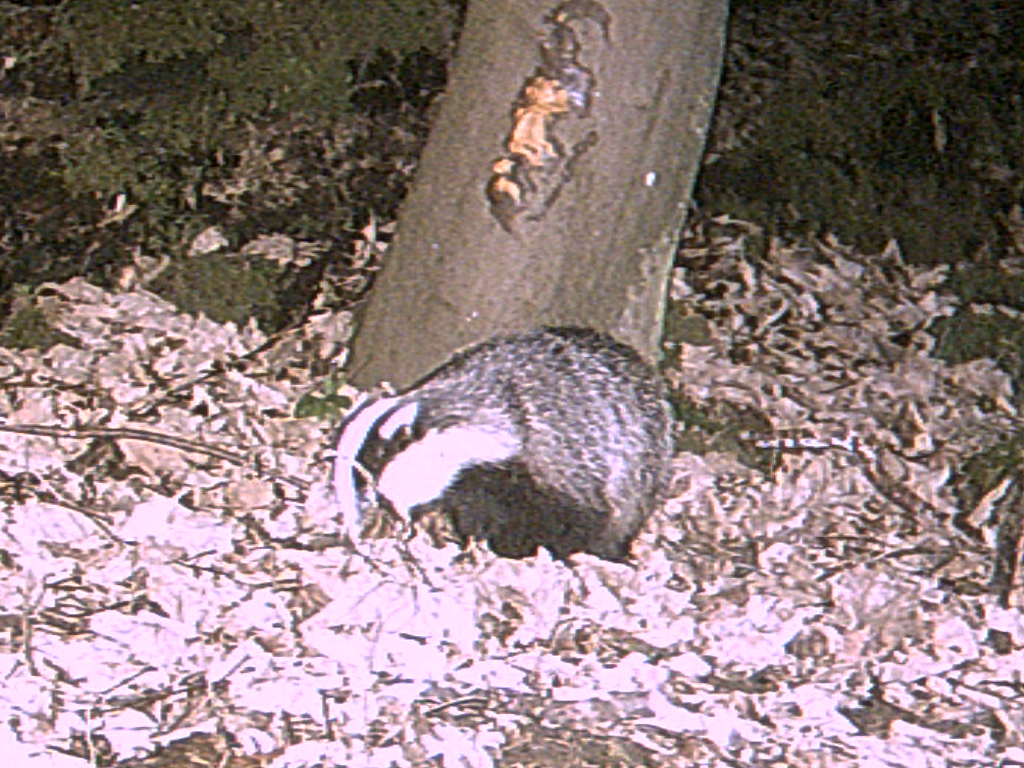
European badger - Meles meles

The native red squirrel is particularly elusive. Its tell-tale signs include large dreys in trees, scratch marks on bark, and chewed Scots pine cones. The future of red squirrels is increasingly uncertain as Eastern grey squirrels outcompete reds for food and habitat as well as carry squirrelpox virus which is lethal to reds but does not harm the greys. Red squirrels have been found throughout Gillies Hill frequenting the pine woodlands of the interior and the craigs. The recent appearance of pine martens, who prefer grey squirrels as prey, on Gillies Hill may enhance the red squirrel population.

The badger is one of the most widespread and iconic animals in Britain. Most people recognise badgers by their black- and white striped head, but because they are nocturnal mammals, they are rarely seen. They do, however, roam onto Gillies Hill and signs of badger activity (heavily worn badger paths with distinctive 5-toed footprints, claw marks on trees, dung pits and coarse, wiry badger hair caught on the barbs of wire fences) have been documented. In the winter of 2011 a badger was photographed on the hill with a hidden wildlife camera. The largest threat to badgers on Gillies Hill - outside of potential quarrying and development - is the traffic that travels along Polmaise Road.

In the summer of 2012 bats were detected throughout Gillies Hill and its perimeter using monitors on loan from Central Scotland Bat Group (Bat Conservation Trust).

==== Birds ====
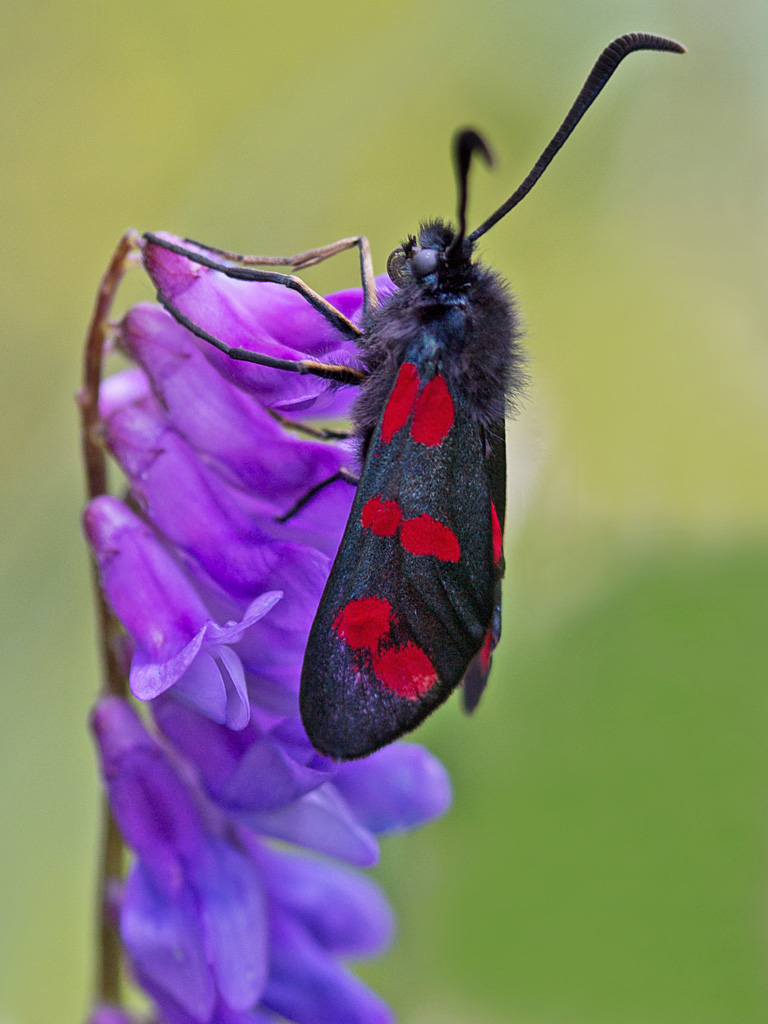
Six-spot burnet - Zygaena filipendulae

Many species of small birds such as robins, dunnocks, green finches, siskin, woodcocks, and tits reside in the woodlands of Gillies Hill. Large corvids, the crows and the ravens, also inhabit the hill along with raptors such as the peregrine falcon which has been spotted on the western quarry cliffs. In the late summer of 2010 a red kite was spotted flying over the hill. After an absence of 130 years, red kites have recently been re-introduced to Scotland at Argaty near Doune where the population is slowly increasing; the recent sighting over Gillies Hill may indicate that the kite population is spreading to the south.

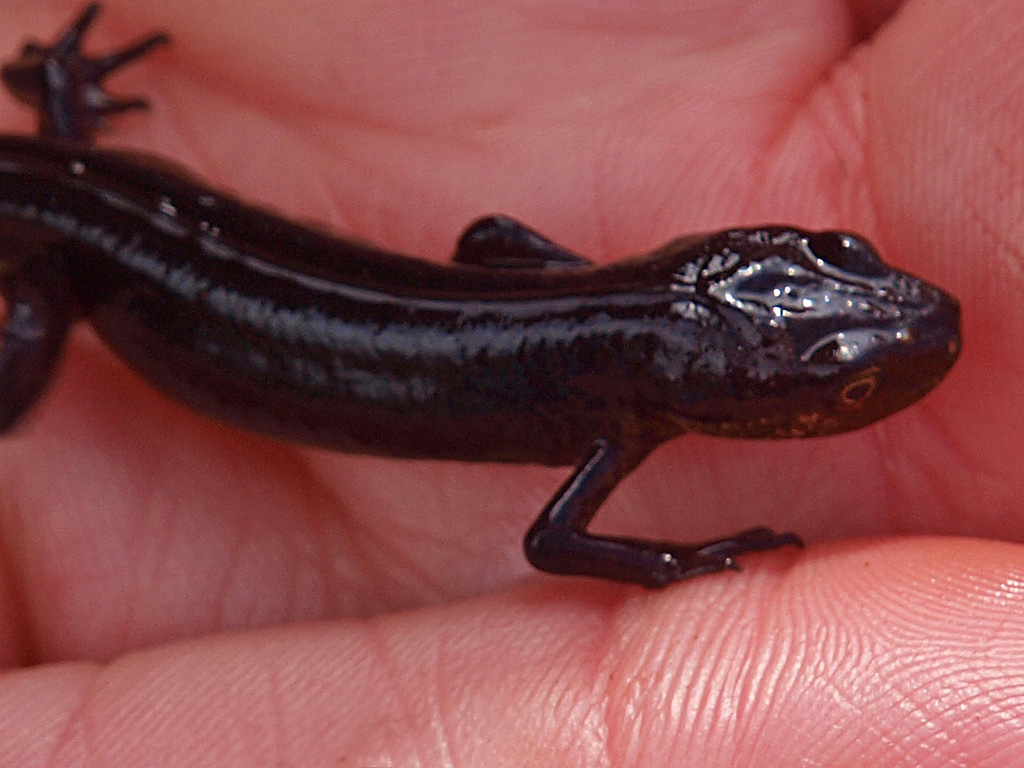
Palmate newt - Lissotriton helveticus, Loch Kruse

==== Amphibians ====
Palmate newts inhabit little Loch Kruse (named after the Texas botanist, Dale Kruse, who studied its sedges and rushes) at the top of Gillies Hill and common toads have been found in the vicinity of Polmaise Castle and its walled garden

==== Invertebrates ====
88 invertebrate species have been documented on Gillies Hill so far; molluscs, arachnids, annelids and insects which include bumblebees, wasps, ants and sawflies, damselflies, dragonflies, caddisflies, grasshoppers, stoneflies, backswimmers, butterflies, moths, house flies, ants, knapweed bugs, water striders, aphids, and a myriad of beetles.

== Environmental concerns and current status ==
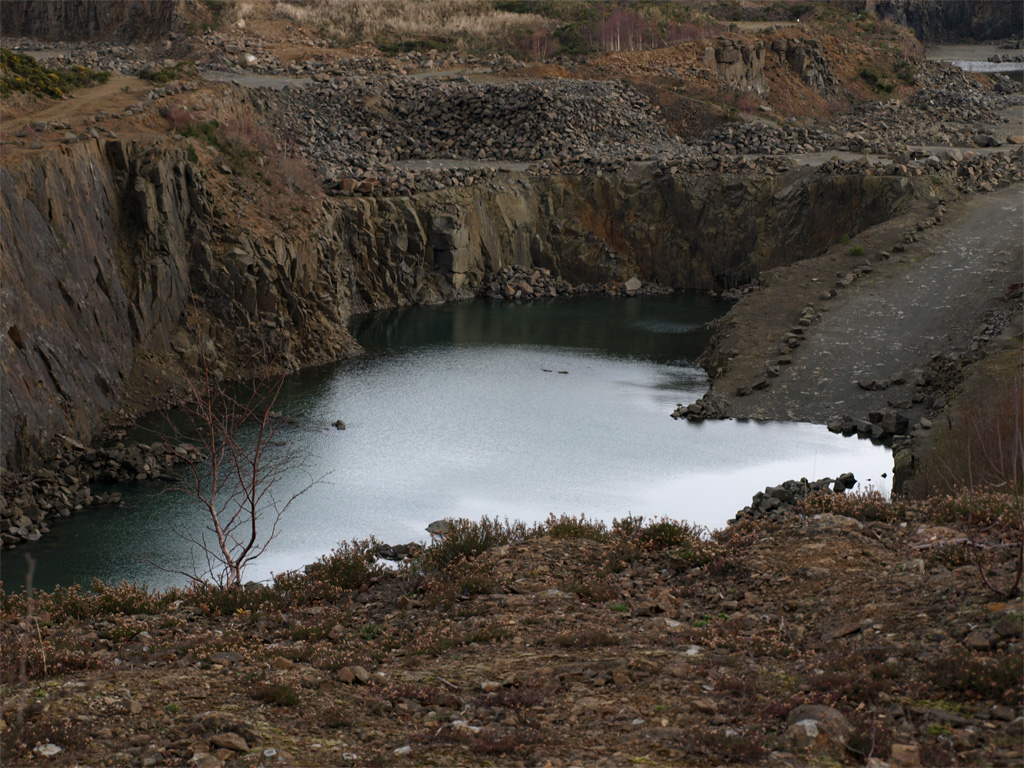
Murrayshall Quarry, August 2008

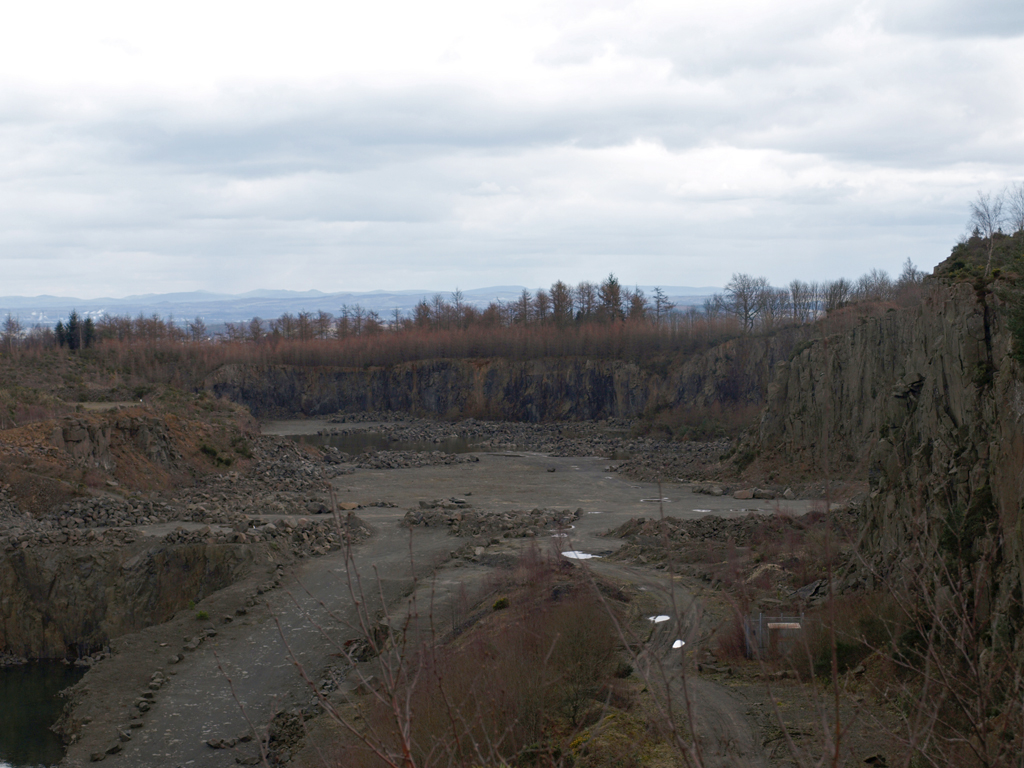
Murrayshall Quarry, April 2008

Currently a concrete plant is operating in Murrayshall Quarry. In 2021 Patersons Quarries Ltd. was granted permission to quarry a substantial portion of the western half of Gillies Hill. Access road construction began in 2022. Protestors continue to object to the quarrying and to try to save the grove of five giant Sequoia on the top of the hill.
