= Bannock Burn =

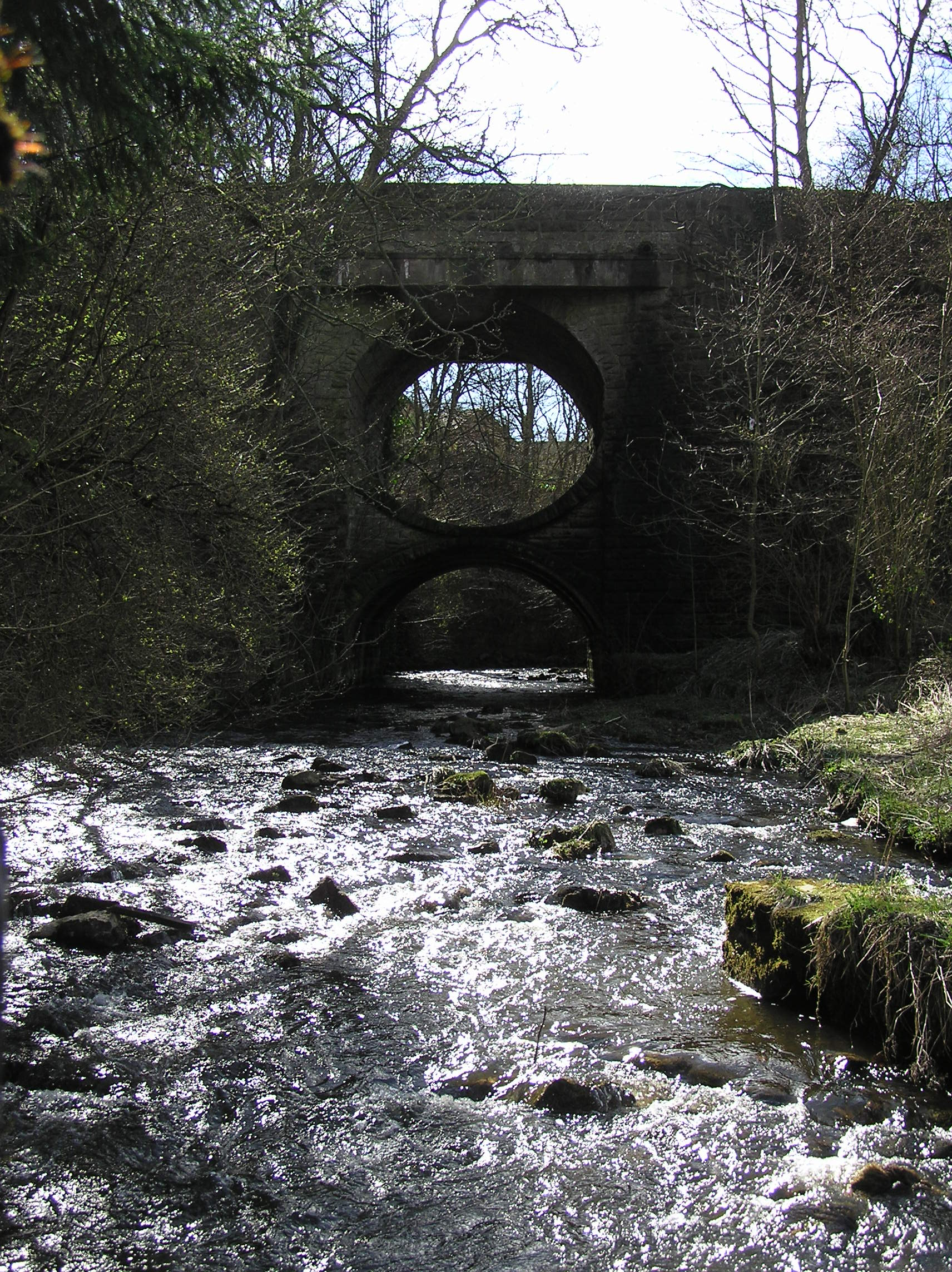
- The Bannock Burn flowing under Thomas Telford's bridge in Bannockburn
- Native name: Allt a' Bhonnaich (Scottish Gaelic)

Location
- Country: United Kingdom
- Constituent country: Scotland
- Council area: Stirling

Physical characteristics
- Mouth: River Forth
  - coordinates: 56.12065°N 3.88057°W

The Bannock Burn (Scottish Gaelic: Allt a' Bhonnaich) is a stream (burn is Scots for stream) which rises at about 1,300 feet (400 m) on Touchadam Moor, NS715891, just to the north of Earl's Hill in the Touch Hills to the south-west of Stirling in central Scotland. The Bannock flows eastward and enters the River Forth to the east of Stirling, close to the site of the Battle of Bannockburn (1314), about 7.58 miles (12.20 km) from its source. The burn itself meanders and is considerably longer. A nearby town, nowadays a suburb of Stirling, is accordingly called Bannockburn.

The Battle of Sauchieburn (1488) was also fought close to the Bannock Burn.

The Bannock Burn marks a significant point on the Clyde–Forth isthmus — hence the battle muster cry from beyond Bannauc. (Note: Alistair Moffat – Scotland, A History... Caledonia..."In a 7th century epic poem known as Y Gododdin...the inheritors of the domain of the Votadini... (Note: The Gododdin people are assumed to have been descendants of the Votadini tribe of the Romano-British period.)warriors came to a battle muster. . .from beyond Bannauc. . . a name that survives in the famous Bannock Burn...) In Sub-Roman Britain the isthmus defined the boundary between the Picts of Caledonia to the north, the Celtic Britons of the Hen Ogledd (Old North) to the south, and the Gododdin to the northeast. (Note: Alan G. James – The Brittonic Language... < ban[n] >..."Bannockburn...ban[n] + -ǭg...this stream-name preserves the hill-name regularly used in mediaeval Welsh literature to define the boundary between the Britons of the Hen Ogledd (Old North) and the Picts ...Old Welsh Bannauc (VCadoc), Middle Welsh Bannawg (Culhwch and Olwen)...The burn rises below Earls Hill...possibly the eponymous *Bann...) (Note: Celtic Britons – Note the map of Great Britain: 1. North – Mainly Pictish areas.; 2. South – Mainly (non-Pictish) Brittonic areas.; The division is defined by the Clyde–Forth isthmus.)

== Etymology ==
The name element Bannock (or Bannauc) derives from the Brittonic language bann, meaning "summit of a hill", (Note: Alan G. James – The Brittonic Language... < ban[n] >..."In Celtic place names generally, ‘a point, a promontory, a hill-spur’, and in Brittonic and Pritenic place-names, ‘a summit’...) and -ǭg, meaning "being of", "kind of" or "association with". (Note: Alan G. James – The Brittonic Language... < -ǭg >..."Adjectival and nominal suffix, indicating ‘being of the kind of’, ‘association with’, ‘abounding in’...It occurs very widely in river-names, hill-names and other topographic names...)

Burn is Scots language for small river or stream.

The burn rises just to the north of Earl's Hill, (Note: Note that there is also an Earl's Burn that flows south.) however it has been suggested that Bannauc refers to all of the Touch and Gargunnock Hills. (Note: SPNS – The place names of Y Gododdin..."Bannauc (‘the peaked hill, or range of summits’) are the Touch and Gargunnock Hills near Stirling. The name is still preserved in modern Bannockburn (Watson, 195-6).) The toponym might be stream of the hill summit, or stream of the peaks.

== Early habitation ==
The upper part of the valley of the Bannock Burn appears to have been inhabited in the Iron Age. Several duns are to be found in the Graigend and Murrayshall area and a fort on Lewis Hill.

The Dun at Wallstale (NS774909) was partly excavated in June 1965. Discovery and Excavation Scotland 1965. Scottish Regional Group of the Council for British Archaeology. pp. 38–39. A trench was cut across the line of the wall and into the interior, revealing that the wall was about 11 feet thick and exposing other interesting constructional features. A few minor artifacts were found, including fragments of rotary and saddle type quern stones, a piece of slag and a stone with a groove, possibly for sharpening needles.

Other duns in the area are Castlehill 1, Castlehill 2, and Castlehill Wood. Another ruined fort is located on the NW side of Gillies Hill, not actually in the Bannock valley.

== Geology ==
The main reason for the type of agriculture and former industries of the Bannock Valley is due to the underlying geology.

The upper reaches of the Bannock are in peat bog on a base of volcanic rocks, mainly basalt, of Carboniferous age. Moving downstream, at approximately NS742876, where the Bannock begins to enter a significant valley, the basalt gives way to the Lower Limestone Formation of the Carboniferous period, with minimal soil cover on the right bank, while the volcanic formation continues to form or come close to the left bank. In the Craigend area and Touchadam Quarry the lower limestone is exposed on both sides of the burn, and in its bed, and was mined as described below. The Bannock briefly crosses the Stirling Sill, at NS770907, in a region where it transgresses (changes its level within the sedimentary formation) and is therefore at a lower level than in the craggy cliffs of Craigend and Murrayshall, where it forms the uppermost strata.

Below that point the Bannock traverses mainly sedimentary bedrock (although the Stirling Sill lies below, at great depth, throughout its lower course), and appears at the surface near the site of Beaton's Mill, with varying cover of sediments, including sand, gravel, tills and clays. Finally, the carse is actually raised tidal flat deposits, with a base of glacial boulder clay.

Because the underlying structure of the region is that of a coal basin, the bedrock strata tend to slope down towards the centre of the basin, and as this is at a steeper angle than the average gradient of the Bannock, the bedrock beneath comes higher up the Carboniferous succession as the burn progresses downwards towards the Forth. This simplified description is complicated by the existence of several faults, which substantially change the relative depth of the strata. However the net result is that, as already stated, almost the base of the Carboniferous series is seen near Craigend, while the Upper Limestone Formation is encountered towards the Forth, having traversed the Limestone Coal Formation between approximately the line of the M9 motorway and Millhall.

== Mining industry ==
Above North Third reservoir, the exposed limestone was locally quarried and processed in primitive limekilns on a very small scale. Traces remain visible. Just below the reservoir at North Third, limestone was formerly mined, mostly in the Murrayshall Limestone strata, the other several strata present not being of suitable quality. The Murrayshall Limestone is the local name, based on where it was first identified, however it is now known to be the same as the Hurlet limestone found in the Central Coalfield. Limestone was converted to calcium oxide (quicklime) in lime kilns, the remains of which can be seen today, and then to calcium hydroxide in slaking pits. This was used for agricultural purposes, in reducing the acidity of the soil in the area. The limestone was first worked at the Touchadam Quarry, and the adjacent Craigend Lime Works, where there were several separate banks of lime kilns, and at least four adit mines, beneath the quartz-dolerite of the Stirling Sill. Later operations moved to the Murrayshall Lime Works (also seemingly known as Murray's Hole) in Gillies Hill, above the north bank of the Bannock Burn, and later moved to the opposite side of Gillies Hill, near Cambusbarron, which lies outside the area of the Bannock valley. At least two entrances to the mines were still accessible when last inspected, however these were in very dangerous condition and should on no account be entered. Lime kilns can be seen at all three sites. The nearby quarries of relatively modern origin are in the quartz-dolerite of the Stirling Sill, which lies above the Murrayshall Limestone, and have no connection with the lime workings. These quarries, which in the 1970s were producing substantial quantities of crushed dolerite for use as roadstone, have also now closed, and the Murrayshall Quarry site is occupied by a concrete plant.

The Touchadam Smithy, a blacksmiths, was located between the Craigend and Murrayshall sites, and doubtless was involved in providing sharp tools for the miners.

There was a colliery on the south bank of the Bannock Burn, at Pirnhall, just outside Whins of Milton, which marked the western extremity of the Stirling Coalfield, a part of the Central Scotland Coalfield. However the site has been a builder's yard (Ogilvies) since the mid-1960s. The right bank of the burn at this point is basically mine waste, and contains many fossils of the several types of giant ferns which eventually formed the coal.

There has been small-scale mining in the area between Whins of Milton and Bannockburn. The Coal Authority Interactive Map shows three mine shafts on the south bank across the burn near, and downstream from, Beaton's Mill. An area known to have been mined is shown as extending NNW towards Whins of Milton village and must have passed under the burn. There are also three adit mines shown further downstream, again on the right bank, one opposite the saw mill, and the other two some way below the modern Bannockburn bridge in what is now a public park. One or both of these would seem to fit the description in the Old Statistical Account"The water which comes from the old coal-workings of Bannockburn and Auchenbowie joins the river Bannock, a little below the village of Bannockburn." Little or nothing of these old mine workings, which are not shown on OS maps dated 1896, and are probably much older, is still visible.

Several coal seams must have been exposed in the bed or banks of the burn, but all traces have been obscured by later developments such as the mills in that area.

== Bridges and fords ==
Starting at the source and progressing downstream, there is a bridge on the mostly single track road at NS730885, which replaces the ford and footbridge which served up till the late 1960s. A significant upper tributary, the King's Yett Burn, on the same road, also had its ford and footbridge, NS739891, replaced by a proper bridge. There remains a ford and footbridge at NS755880, on a minor single track road, above the North Third reservoir. This ford is dangerous for normal cars in times of severe flood, but is passable at most times. There is a privately owned ford, and sometimes a footbridge (although this has been damaged or destroyed more than once) at NS770907. There used to be rudimentary footbridges near Park Mill at NS779904 and NS795903, however these would need to be confirmed by visual inspection as there is some doubt as to their condition. There is a private road bridge leading only to Chartershall House at NS786901.

The most substantial bridge across the Bannock is probably the M9 motorway bridge at NS789902. Then comes the new (late 1960s) Chartershall bridge NS792902 carrying a normal 2 lane road, just upstream of the old humped arch stone single track Chartershall Bridge, which is retained as the access to some cottages. The "Long Line" bridges the burn at NS796899 as does the A80 Glasgow Road at Whins of Milton NS801897. There are then several modern footbridges in the area between Whins of Milton and Bannockburn. The first, NS802898, replaces a ford. The next is not in quite the same place as a former mill footbridge, NS806900. The next, NS804902, appears to be of modern origin and unrelated to the original footpaths associated with the mills. Stepping stones may remain in situ at NS805903 but their use is inadvisable.

Next is the old Thomas Telford's Bannockurn bridge, a rare circular stone arch, NS807904, followed by the "new" bridge carrying the A9, NS809905. The park contains three footbridges at NS810905, NS811906 and NS812909. A road bridge nearby, NS812910, leads Pike Road from a roundabout on the A91 bypass to a modern housing estate, the railway crosses the Bannock at NS813912 and the A91 itself at NS815915. Finally the A905 Kerse Road crosses the Bannock Burn at NS817923, while the A91 crosses the Pelstream Burn, a significant tributary, at NS816926.

== Dams, mills, weirs and lades ==
In the upper part of the Bannock valley there is a reservoir at North Third, which supplies water to the petrochemical complex at Grangemouth.

The Bannock Burn and its tributaries were formerly used extensively to provide water power for various mills and factories. The old Ordnance Survey maps, from which the following grid references are derived, are the best source of information about the mills and the arrangements for their water supply. The highest mill on the Bannock Burn itself was the Park Farm and Mill, on the right bank of the burn, looking downstream, NS781904 (weir) and NS784902 (mill), and of approximately four cottages in a row, two were still occupied in 1957, and one until the early 1960s. Unfortunately they have now been demolished.

Continuing downstream, the Mill Dam, NS789903, just above Chartershall, which has been rebuilt and relocated during the construction of the M9 motorway, diverts some of the flow into the Mill Lade on the left bank, which for part of its length was widened to provide some storage. This part is crossed by a straight road formerly called the Long Line, however due to the construction of a bridge over the M9 motorway, it is no longer straight.

A small sluice allowed some water to be diverted to Roadhead, formerly a farm, NS800898, the excess draining off to the Bannock. After passing under the A80 Glasgow Road just south of the original village of Whins of Milton, the next mill was Milton Corn Mill NS801900, followed by Beaton's Mill, NS802899, where James III of Scotland was murdered on 11 June 1488, following the Battle of Sauchieburn, itself fought near the south bank of the Bannock Burn. Unfortunately, Beaton's Mill was vandalised and burnt down in the 1950s, and the area is now occupied by housing. Next was a flour mill at NS803899, which existed into at least the 1960s and used some kind of turbine, the water from the lade being controlled by a sluice and then descending through a vertical tube to drive the turbine wheel at the bottom. The lade and Bannock Burn come close together at this point. This was the end of the first lade.

The next mill was a woollen mill at NS804899, on the left bank, and it had its own adjacent weir. Another weir at NS805899 fed another woollen mill at NS806899, which has long gone, although the adjacent footbridge remained into the 1960s. Immediately downstream, at NS806900, another weir fed a lade on the right bank, no longer visible, supplied a fairly large woollen carpet factory just above the old bridge, NS806904. At one time this lade continued through the "new" bridge NS809904, where the A9 crosses the burn, forming a water feature in what became a public park downstream of the bridge, but this has now been removed, as it presented a potential risk of drowning. Traces are still visible. However, a substantial weir at NS808904, between the old and new bridges, diverted water into a left bank weir, which also passed through the park, on its northern edge and ran some distance, past Millhall, joined the Pelstream Burn at NS810923, and then to the Kerse Mills NS813924, and from there to rejoin the Bannock Burn at NS815925, near Muirton Farm NS814926, lost beneath a superstore. Beyond that point there is no scope for extracting further energy as the Bannock is now at close to the lever of the River Forth. This part of the Bannock Burn, in the low-lying Carse land, is the region where the Battle of Bannockburn is now believed to have happened.

Turning now to the tributaries, the Canglour Burn, via an adjacent weir, powered an early turbine, said to still exist, at Millholm (later, Milnholm) NS784876. This powered a sawmill. The outflow from Milnholm formerly constituted the Auchenbowie Burn, a tributary of the River Carron, and would have entered the Forth at Grangemouth. However, part of the flow was diverted by a weir at NS786876 and a lade, curiously still named the Canglour Burn, to pass through the Howietown Fishery, NS785883, join the Sauchie Burn at NS781887 and enter Cultenhove Dam (now called Swanswater Fishery) NS at NS781898. Apart from its potential for fishing, this dam has two outlets, a simple weir diverted overflow down what is now called the Sauchie Burn, while a controllable sluice, NS 782899, at a lower level fed the lade to a sawmill at NS785899, near Cultenhove Farm. The water returned to the Sauchie Burn nearby.

A weir at NS787899 diverted water to a Corn Mill at NS788900 and Chartershall Mill, NS788901, both now obliterated under modern farm buildings. Traces of the lade are still visible. Below Chartershall farm, the Sauchie Burn joins the Bannock Burn, above the Mill dam weir, so the water then continued through all the dams, lades and mills described above, except for the uppermost Park Farm Mill.

These seemingly complex arrangements allowed reasonably good utilisation of the available energy, with relatively simple construction.

== The Bannock Burn Valley today ==
Nowadays there is superficially little sign of either the industries (lime and mills) or the battles which were historically significant, and the banks of the Bannock Burn, for most of its length, are quiet and peaceful. The countryside is mainly agricultural. A number of footpaths exist, and invite exploration. In following these, the inquisitive will still be able to find many of the sites of industry or habitation if they look closely.

== Sources ==
- James, Alan G. (2019). "The Brittonic Language in the Old North, A Guide to the Place-Name Evidence, Volume 2" (PDF). Scottish Place-Name Society.
- Moffat, Alistair (2017). Scotland, A History from Earliest Times. Birlinn. ISBN 978-1780274386.
