= Stirling Sill =

Dolerite intrusion in southern Scotland

Coordinates: 56.123°N 3.946°W

The Stirling Sill is an outcropping of a large quartz-dolerite intrusion or sill that underlies a large part of central Scotland, and may be contiguous at great depth. The sill is of very late Carboniferous age or more probably Permian, as it penetrates the coal measures, often in bedding planes between the various strata. In places, it rises through fractures in the strata to a new level, forming features that, at the surface, would be called dikes.

At its outcrop on the west, the sill generally lies towards the base of the Carboniferous sequence, and just above the calciferous sandstone deposits and lavas, as can be seen in the upper part of the valley of the Bannock Burn. However, to the consternation of miners, it occupies a higher position amongst the useful strata towards the east, and in places has destroyed the coal, while in others the effect of the sill has been to convert the coal to more valuable anthracite.

The slope of the Abbey Craig, or the Stirling Castle rock, gives a general idea of the angle of dip of the coal measures at the extremity or the coalfield, and the thickness of the sill can also be seen, which is approximately 100 metres (330 ft).

Geologists have had various theories about the formation of anthracite, as the coal has been most effectively baked near the Ochil Fault, however the theories are not necessarily incompatible.

The source of the sill, where the molten rock rose from below, is not known; however it is known that there are risers in the Ochil Fault, although these are inconsistent with the overall structure. The main origin of the sill may be in the region of the eruptive centre that formed the Ochil Hills in a much earlier period, which geologists postulate is somewhere to the east of Stirling, possibly in the region of Kincardine. This ties in with subsidence following the first round of eruptive activity that lead to the formation of the coal basins, with a much later outbreak of intrusive activity from the same magma feeders, however the truth will remain unknown because it would take very many deep bores in hard rock to probe the depths and find the necessary evidence.

The western extremities of the sill can be seen at the Abbey Craig, Stirling Castle, Kings Park, Gillies Hill, Sauchieburn and various points to the south.

The quartz-dolerite was once quarried at several places including Cambusbarron and Murrayshall, but is quarried today at Northfield, primarily for roadstone.
