= Birkhill House, Stirling =

Coordinates: 56.110906°N 3.961816°W

Birkhill House is a historic house situated between the city of Stirling and the village of Cambusbarron in central Scotland.

== History ==
Birkhill House marked on John Grassom's 1817 Map of Stirling

There is evidence that the land on which the house now stands had been inhabited from as early 1700 BC when the village of Cambusbarron was a permanent community.

The discovery of fragments of Roman glass nearby gave weight to local 19th century tradition that the house was built on the site of a Roman villa, however this theory is now considered unlikely. A record of the current structure can be seen on the North East section of John Grassom’s 1817 map of the ‘County of Stirling’. The estate originally consisted of the house, stables and an orchard.

== Archaeological Finds ==
Several archaeological discoveries have been made in the grounds of Birkhill House. The earliest discoveries were made in February 1879 and included cists, bones and food vessels. The names 'Birkhill' and 'Cambusbarron' were not applied consistently when documenting the finds; but the main site was on both the E and W sides of Birkhill House and in the former sandpit to the W of the house, which itself lies NE of Cambusbarron. The possibility of pinpointing the original positions and disentangling the accumulation of sites and artefacts is now remote, due to the alteration of the topography surrounding Birkhill House, however the importance of the area is evident. The artefacts are now housed in the Stirling Smith Museum and Art Gallery and The National Museum of Antiquities of Scotland.
