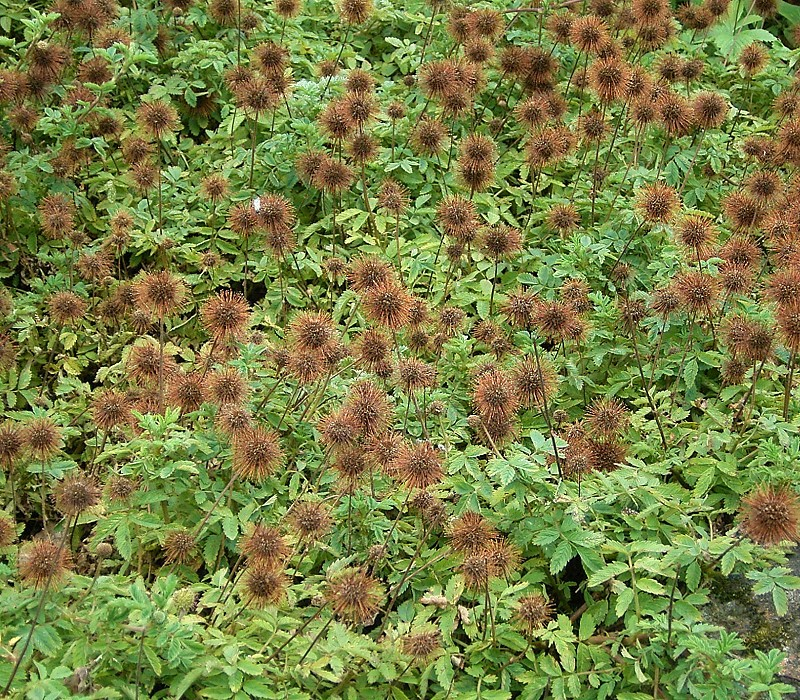

Scientific classification
- Kingdom: Plantae
- Clade: Tracheophytes
- Clade: Angiosperms
- Clade: Eudicots
- Clade: Rosids
- Order: Rosales
- Family: Rosaceae
- Genus: Acaena
- Species: A. ovalifolia

Binomial name
- Acaena ovalifolia Ruiz & Pav.

Synonyms
- Ancistrum ovalifolium (Ruiz & Pav.) Sweet; Acaena elegans Gay; Acaena hirsuta Phil.; Acaena krausei var. hirsuta (Phil.) Reiche; Acaena micranthera Bitter; Acaena ovalifolia subsp. australis Bitter; Acaena ovalifolia var. calophylla Bitter; Acaena ovalifolia var. calvescenticupula Bitter; Acaena ovalifolia subsp. chamaephyllon Bitter; Acaena ovalifolia var. chamanthera Bitter; Acaena ovalifolia var. chubutensis Bitter; Acaena ovalifolia var. dolichacantha Bitter; Acaena ovalifolia var. elegans (Gay) Reiche; Acaena ovalifolia subsp. elegans (Gay) Bitter; Acaena ovalifolia subsp. glabricaulis Bitter; Acaena ovalifolia var. hirsuta Hosseus; Acaena ovalifolia var. incisiserrata Bitter; Acaena ovalifolia var. insulae-exterioris Bitter; Acaena ovalifolia var. nirihuaoensis Hosseus; Acaena ovalifolia var. serrata Bitter; Acaena ovalifolia var. subglabrescens Bitter; Acaena ovalifolia var. subserrata Bitter; Acaena ovalifolia var. subsexjuga Bitter; Acaena ovalifolia var. subtuspellita Bitter; Acaena ovalifolia var. tenerrima Bitter; Acaena ovalis Pers.; Acaena tenuipila Bitter; Ancistrum repens Vent.

= Acaena ovalifolia =

Species of flowering plant

Acaena ovalifolia is a species of flowering plant belonging to the family Rosaceae. Its native range is Western South America to Falkland Islands. The plant has been used to treat unspecified medicinal disorders.
