= Carse =

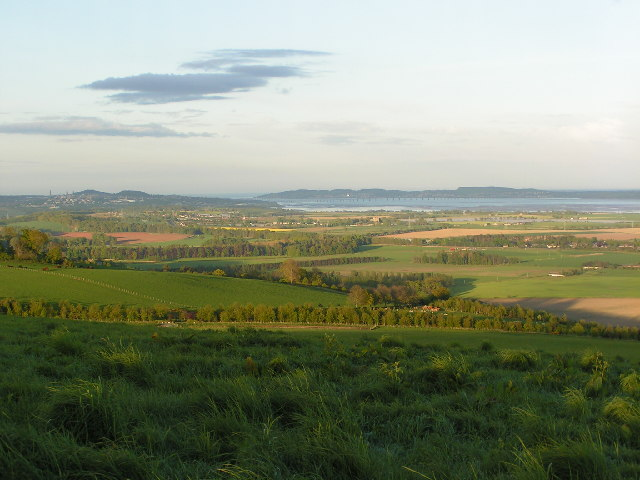
Carse of Gowrie looking towards Dundee.

In Scottish geography, a carse (the modern form of older Scots kerse; Scottish Gaelic càrrsa or còrrsa) is an area of fertile, low-lying (typically alluvial) land occupying certain Scottish river valleys, such as that of the River Forth. They reflect raised estuarine deposits lifted above sea level by post-glacial rebound

== Carse of Forth ==
The Carse of Forth contrasts with the Ochil Hills to the north, from which it is separated by the Ochil Fault. The carse is generally so flat that, except in the case of alluvial fans, such as that on which the small town of Alva is situated, it has only reached a height of about 9 metres above sea level at the Ochil Fault, typically two or more miles from the river.

In the case of the River Forth, the carse extends some considerable distance above and below Stirling, where due to constraints such as the Abbey Craig to the north and the castle rock, on which the town is based, to the south, it is very narrow.

The carse typically offers good agricultural land, however underlying the topsoil and alluvium is glacial boulder clay. In other places, especially in the west, the carse was overlain by peat bogs such as Flanders Moss, much of which has been cleared to improve agriculture.

== Other carses ==
- Carse of Gowrie, Perthshire, near Blairgowrie
- Carse of Lecropt near Bridge of Allan, Stirling
- Carse of Stirling
- Carse of Ae
- Carse of Falkirk
- Carse of Blair Drummond, Stirling
- Friar's Carse, Dumfries and Galloway
- Carsphairn
- The Carse (Inverness)
- Kinneil Kerse (West Lothian)
- Carse of Raddery (Ross and Cromarty)
- Carse Knowe (West Lothian)
- Kerse (Ayrshire)
- East Kerse Mains (West Lothian)
- Carsethorn (Kirkcudbright), Dumfries and Galloway
- Carse Grey estate near Forfar, plus nearby Carseburn and Carsebank (Angus)
