= Abbey Craig =

Hill north of Stirling, Scotland

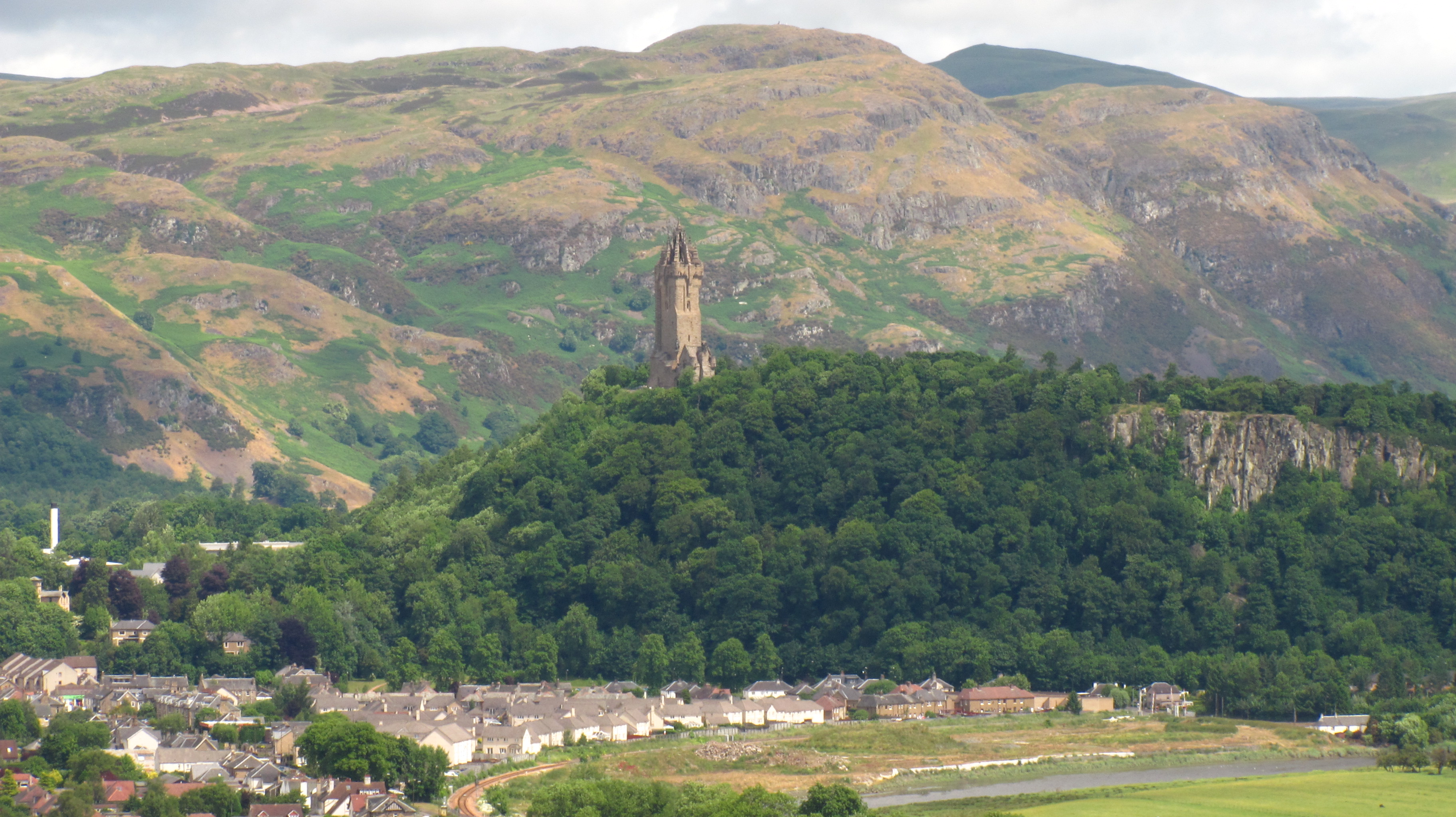
- Abbey Craig with Wallace Monument on top

Highest point
- Elevation: 111 m (364 ft)
- Prominence: 83 m (272 ft)
- Coordinates: 56°08′18″N 3°55′05″W

Geography
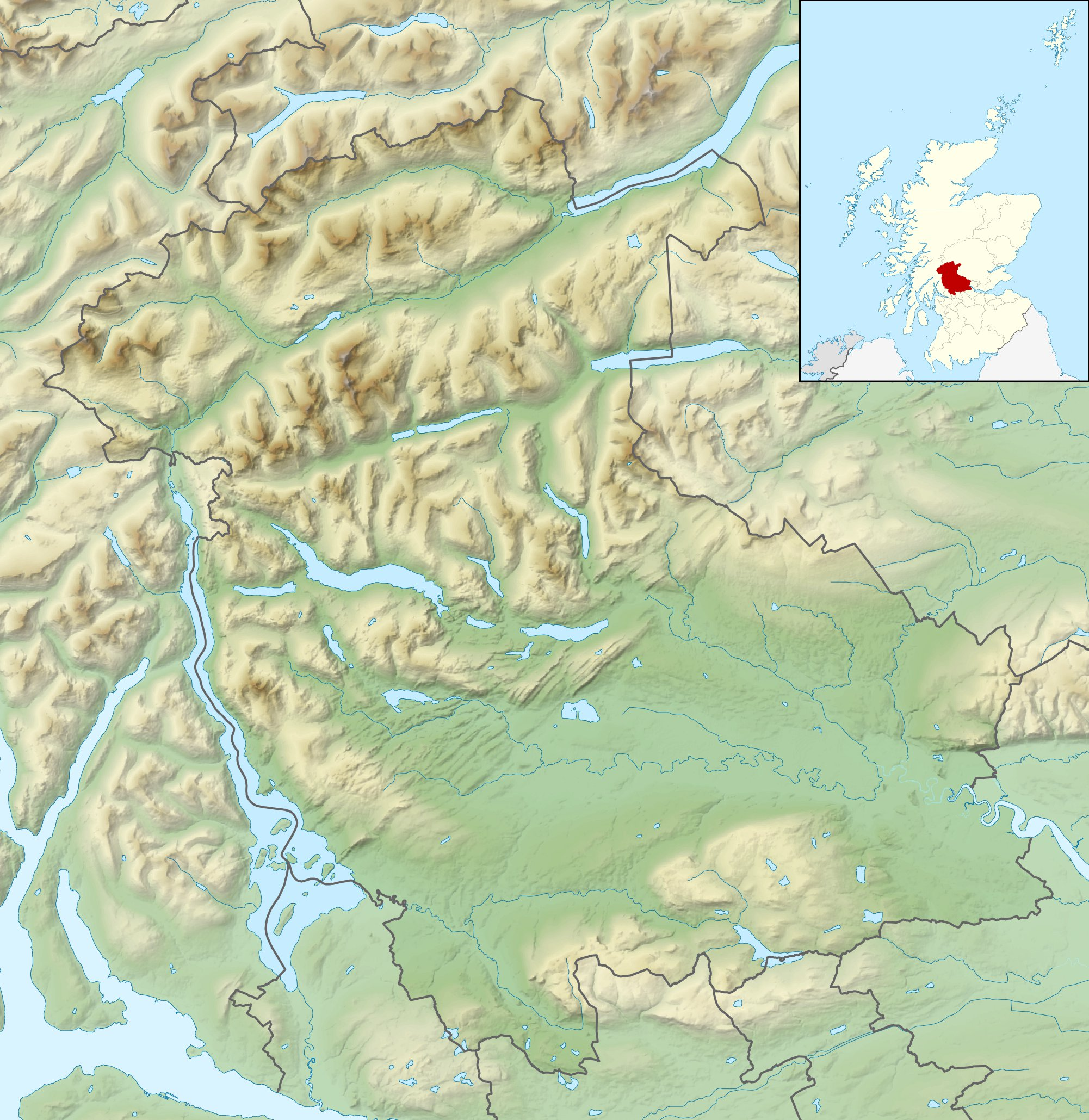
- Location within Stirling
- Location: Ochil Hills, Scotland
- OS grid: NS809956
- Topo map: OS Landranger 57

The Abbey Craig is the hill upon which the Wallace Monument stands, at Causewayhead, just to the north of Stirling, Scotland.

== Physical geography ==
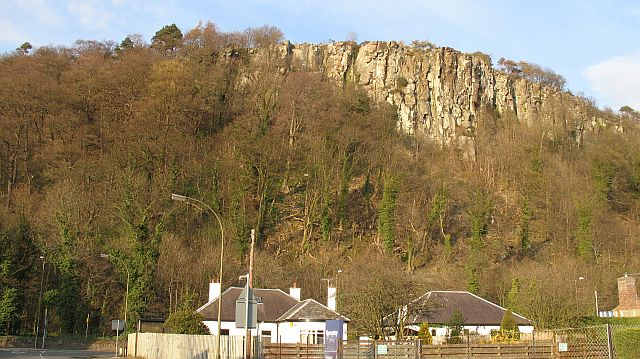
Abbey Craig, 2008

The Abbey Craig is part of a complex quartz-dolerite intrusion or sill within Carboniferous strata, at the western edge of the Central Coal Field, known as the Stirling Sill.

The quartz-dolerite, being much harder than the surrounding coal measures, has been exposed due to erosion, including by glaciation. The characteristic crag and tail shape of the crag reflects this glacial shaping.

== Toponymy ==
Craig, or crag, describes a post-glacial crag and tail landscape feature. The abbey is Cambuskenneth Abbey, on the north bank of the River Forth, about 1 km to the south.

== History ==
The hill is the site of William Wallace's HQ ahead of the battle of Stirling Bridge in 1297, which was part of the Scottish Wars of Independence.

The hilltop was also defended during the Early Medieval Period, and features a vitrified hillfort, destroyed by fire in the 6th or 7th centuries AD and then refortified in 8th or 9th centuries AD, as demonstrated by two phases of archaeological excavation, the first by SUAT Archaeology in 2001 and the second by Murray Cook, Stirling Council's Archaeologist in 2012.
