= Cambusbarron =

Village in Stirling, Scotland

Coordinates: 56.109°N 3.968°W

Cambusbarron: Scottish Gaelic: Camas a' Bharrain
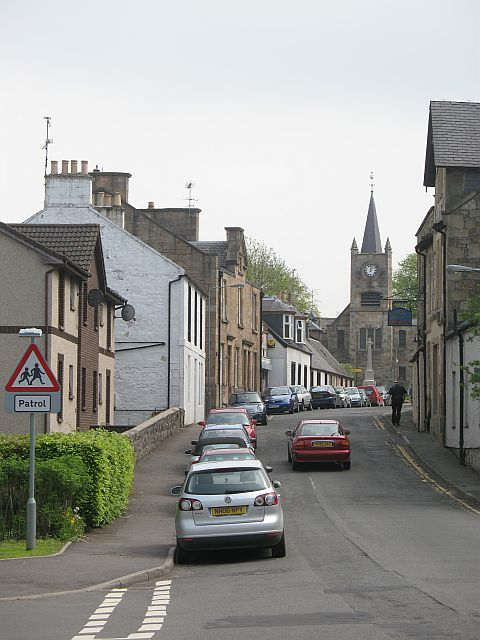
- Village of Cambusbarron

- Location within the Stirling council area
- Population: 3,224
- OS grid reference: NS776924
- Civil parish: St. Ninians
- Council area: Stirling
- Lieutenancy area: Stirling and Falkirk
- Country: Scotland
- Sovereign state: United Kingdom
- Post town: STIRLING
- Postcode district: FK7
- Dialling code: 01786
- Police: Scotland
- Fire: Scottish
- Ambulance: Scottish
- UK Parliament: Stirling and Strathallan
- Scottish Parliament: Stirling
- Website: cambusbarron.com

Cambusbarron is a village in Stirling, Scotland. In the 2001 census, it had a population of 3,224. There is evidence of settlement at the site since the Bronze Age, and several forts dating from the Iron Age have been found near the village. One such fort is located at Gillies Hill, a large semi-natural ancient woodland area with a range of unusual wildlife, thought to be the site of Robert the Bruce's camp shortly before the Battle of Bannockburn.

Cambusbarron grew during the nineteenth century due to the presence of the Hayford Mill, a large wool-spinning mill and tweed manufacturer, on the outskirts of the village. Several limestone mines and quartz-dolerite quarries have been active in the area around Cambusbarron during the twentieth century. There are three listed buildings in the village. Notable former residents include evangelist Henry Drummond, documentary writer John Grierson and footballer Frank Beattie.

== History ==
=== Early history ===
Archaeological evidence suggests that a permanent community at what is now Cambusbarron was established during the Bronze Age, between the years of 1700 and 500 BC. It is not known if the site was occupied during the Stone Age. A number of hill forts dating from the Iron Age have been found close to Cambusbarron, although none have been discovered in the centre of the village. At one fort, Castlehill Wood, fragments of glass dating from the first or second century AD have been discovered, suggesting that the Romans may have briefly occupied the fort during their conquest of Britain.

In the sixteenth century, Cambusbarron came under the control of successive Earls of Kellie, before being sold to William Leslie, later the tenth Baron of Balquhain, in 1640. It was then sold to the burgh of Stirling in 1665.

=== Modern history ===
Cambusbarron expanded significantly during the nineteenth century. The opening of the wool-spinning Hayford Mill, also called Cambusbarron Mill or Hayford and Parkvale Mill, in 1834 provided a significant source of employment in the village; by 1871, a series of expansions had seen the mill grow to employ over 1,200 people. The population of the village rose from 657 in 1841 to 1,230 in 1881. After the closure of the mill in 1896, the population fell as few alternative sources of employment were available.

A public school was erected in Cambusbarron in 1875, with capacity for 270 pupils. Towards the end of the nineteenth century, quarrying became an important industry in and around the village. Cambusbarron lies just beyond the western extremity of the Stirling and Clackmannan coalfield, but has significant limestone and quartz-dolerite deposits, both of which have been extracted. Further quarries opened in the area during the twentieth century.

== Gillies Hill ==
Gillies Hill is an area of woodland close to Cambusbarron. It is composed of trees including Wellingtonias and Scots pines and is home to a variety of rare animal life, including red squirrels, peregrine falcons, roe deer and buzzards. It is the site of an Iron Age fort designated a Scheduled Ancient Monument, and is believed to have been the location of Robert the Bruce's camp prior to the Battle of Bannockburn in 1314.

Gillies Hill is also the site of the Murrayshall Quarry. Permission to begin extraction of stones from a small section of the hill was granted in 1982, but by 1996 the quarry had become dormant. In 2007 a proposal by Heidelberg Cement and Tarmac to reopen the quarry on a larger scale led to fierce local opposition and the formation of the Save Gillies Hill group to campaign against the proposal. The Stirling Council on 1 March 2012 required the quarry operators to comply with certain requirements relating to • production of an Environmental Impact Assessment (EIA) (3.24.4) • update quarry restoration plan (3.24.5) • provision of fencing (3.24.7) The council also decided that failure to comply with these requirements would lead to the Council starting the process of issuing a Suspension Order (SO) for the current permission

== Amenities ==
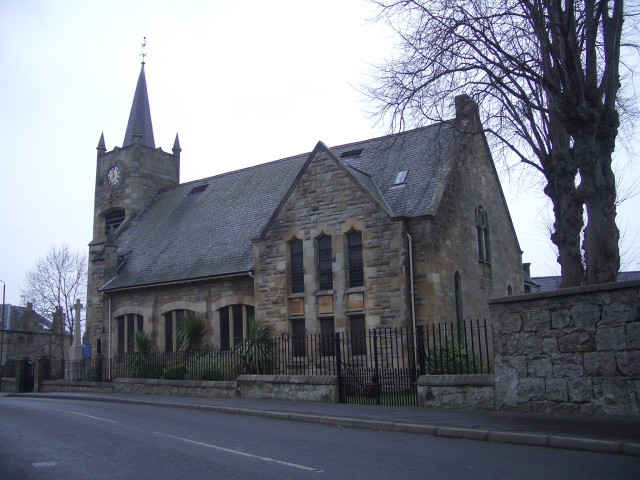
The Bruce Memorial Church in Cambusbarron

The Bruce Memorial Church stands in the centre of Cambusbarron and acts as a focal point within the village. The current minister is Rev Graham Nash. The area in and around the village supports nine local businesses including a public house and a trout fishery. There is also a library in the village. Local bus services linking the village with Stirling and Balfron are provided by First Scotland East.

Education in the village is provided by the ten-classroom Cambusbarron Primary School. In 2008 the school led the Money Week program designed to teach primary school pupils about finance.

Cambusbarron is also home to a local amateur football team, Cambusbarron Rovers A.F.C., which was founded in 1960. It plays in the Caledonian Amateur Football League, and has won the Scottish Amateur Cup on three occasions.

== Notable buildings ==
Hayford Mill was established as a wool-spinning mill in 1834. After being acquired by Robert Smith a decade later, it expanded significantly; by 1871, at which point control had passed to Smith's son, also named Robert, the mill employed over 1200 workers, and was for a time the largest single tweed manufactory in Scotland. However, after Smith's departure in 1895, the mill closed in October 1896.

After its closure the mill remained largely unchanged for many years, and was used as a training base by the King's Own Scottish Borderers during World War I. It was briefly used as a carpet factory prior to World War II, and as a civil defence store after the war, before gaining Category A listed status in September 1989. Hayford House, an 1850 Jacobean villa built for Robert Smith senior close to the mill, was Category B listed at the same time.

The former Water Pump House at the North Third Water Filter Plant, which dates from 1931, is also Category B listed. It was initially closed in 1975, but reopened in 1989 after its filtration equipment was updated. After closing again in 2000, it was sold to a private owner in 2006, receiving its listed status in March 2007.

== Notable residents ==
Evangelist and writer Henry Drummond (1851–1897), although born in Stirling, lived for much of his early life in Cambusbarron, and founded a Sunday school in the village. Documentary film maker John Grierson (1898–1972) was the son of a local school headmaster and also lived in the village as a child, although he was born in Perthshire.

Professional footballer Frank Beattie (1933–2009) was born in the Cambusbarron, and after his retirement ran a newsagent in the village. He also managed Cambusbarron Rovers in the late 1970s and early 1980s, winning the Scottish Amateur Cup trophy with the side in 1978.

Politician Richard Olszewski grew up in Cambusbarron.
