= Quartz-dolerite =

Quartz dolerite or quartz diabase is an intrusive rock similar to dolerite (also called diabase), but with an excess of quartz. Dolerite is similar in composition to basalt, which is volcanic, and gabbro, which is plutonic. The differing crystal sizes are due to the different rate of cooling, basalt cools quickly and has a very fine structure, while gabbro cools very slowly, at great depth, and large crystals develop. Dolerite is intermediate. Quartz-dolerite is found in Scotland, Germany, and Australia.

Quartz dolerite is very common in central Scotland, in intrusive formations, sills and dykes, and is widely quarried for roadstone. It was used with some success for making millstones at one time, the Millstone Grit part of the carboniferous strata not being present in Scotland, but it is no longer used for this purpose, and would probably be illegal now due to the formation of small quartz and other silicate particles, which could cause the serious respiratory disease silicosis. In Scotland, quartz dolerite is commonly known as whin or whinstone.

Quartz dolerite contains many cooling fractures and weathers readily, becoming unstable. It is not uncommon for large boulders to break loose, and significant rockfalls are not uncommon. It is regarded as dangerous as far as climbing is concerned.
