= Sieges of Stirling Castle =

Part of the First War of Scottish Independence

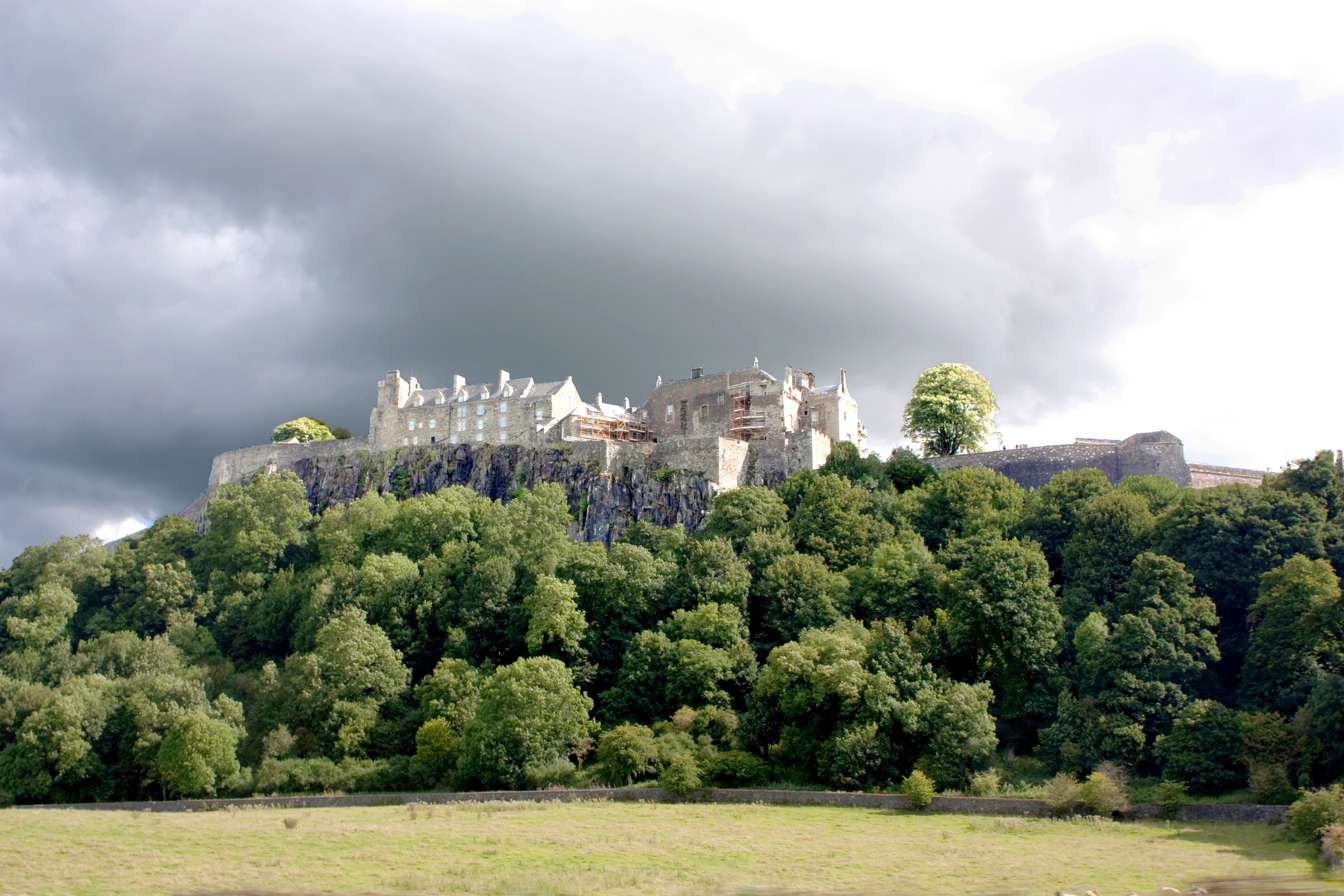
Stirling Castle in 2011

There have been several sieges of Stirling Castle, a strategically important fortification in Stirling, Scotland.

- During the Wars of Scottish Independence
  - Siege of Stirling Castle (1299), successful Scottish siege of an English garrison
  - Siege of Stirling Castle (1304), successful English siege of a Scottish garrison
  - Siege of Stirling Castle (1314), successful Scottish siege of an English garrison preceding the battle of Bannockburn
  - Siège of Stirling Castle (1337), unsuccessful siege by Andrew Murray
- Between 1571 and 1585, the castle was besieged three times by Scottish factions during the reign of James VI.
- Siege of Stirling Castle (1651), successful siege by Oliver Cromwell during the Third English Civil War.
- Siege of Stirling Castle (1746), unsuccessful siege by Charles Edward Stuart during the Jacobite rising of 1745
