= Stirling Castle =

Castle in Scotland

- Stirling, Scotland
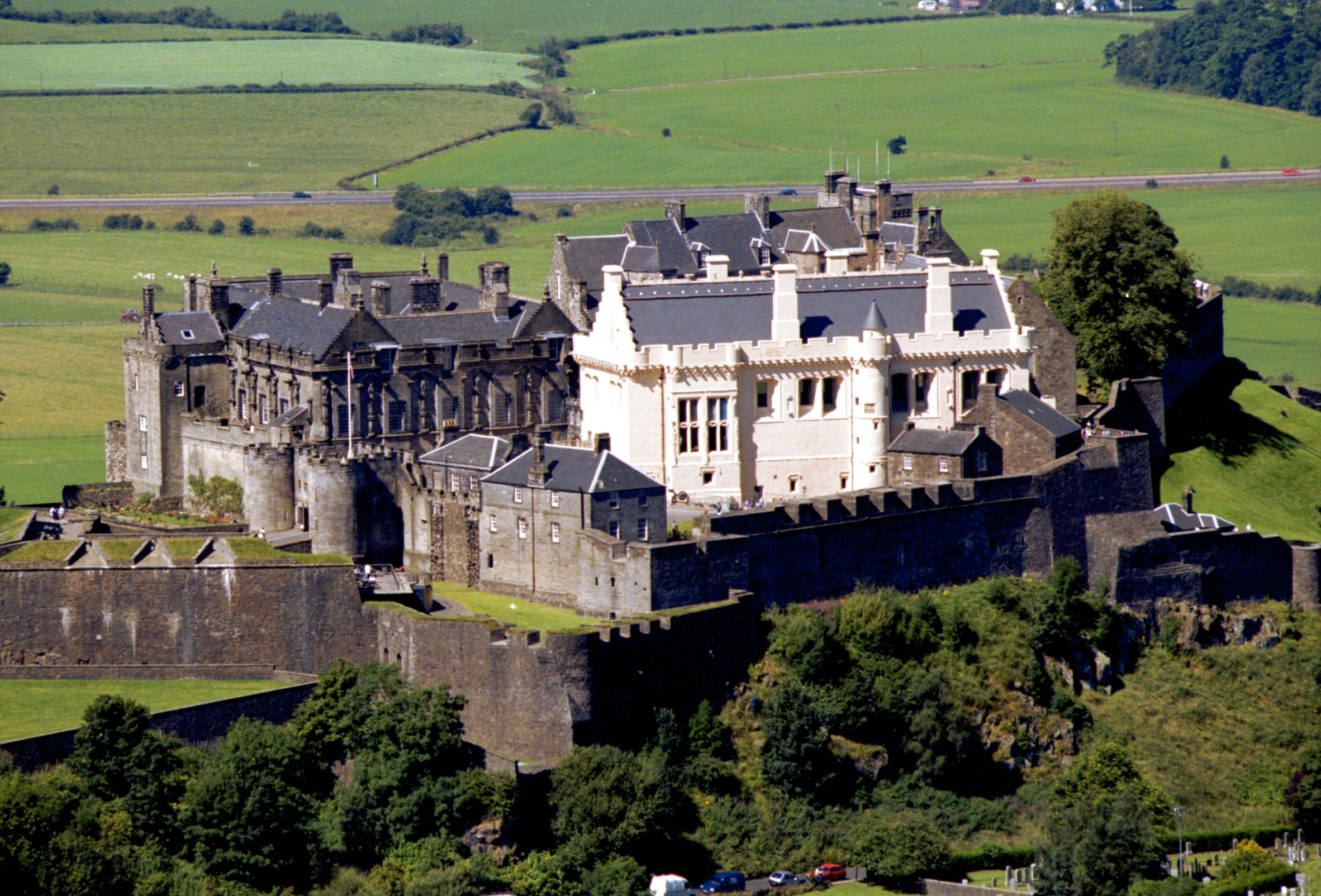
- Aerial view of Stirling Castle

Site information
- Owner: Historic Environment Scotland; Ministry of Defence
- Open to the public: Yes

Location
- Coordinates: 56°07′26″N 03°56′52″W
- Grid reference: grid reference NS789940

Site history
- Built: Castle dates from at least early 12th century, present buildings mostly built between 1490 and 1600
- Built by: Significant works by James IV, James V, and James VI
- In use: Still in use today
- Battles/wars: Sieges and occupations during the Wars of Scottish Independence (1296–1357); sieges in 1651, 1746

Garrison information
- Current commander: James Erskine, 14th Earl of Mar
- Past commanders: Hereditary office of the Earls of Mar
- Occupants

Scheduled monument
- Official name: Stirling Castle
- Designated: 22 February 1994
- Reference no.: SM90291

Stirling Castle (Scottish Gaelic: Caisteal Shruighlea) is one of the largest and most historically and architecturally important castles in Scotland. The castle sits atop an intrusive crag, which forms part of the Stirling Sill geological formation. It is surrounded on three sides by steep cliffs, giving it a strong defensive position. Its strategic location, guarding what was, until the 1890s, the farthest downstream crossing of the River Forth, has made it an important fortification in the region from the earliest times.

Most of the principal buildings of the castle date from the fifteenth and sixteenth centuries. A few structures remain from the fourteenth century, while the outer defences fronting the town date from the early eighteenth century.

Before the union with England, Stirling Castle was also one of the most used of the many Scottish royal residences, very much a palace as well as a fortress. Several Scottish Kings and Queens have been crowned at Stirling, including Mary, Queen of Scots, in 1542, and others were born or died there.

There have been at least eight sieges of Stirling Castle, including several during the Wars of Scottish Independence, with the last being in 1746, when Bonnie Prince Charlie unsuccessfully tried to take the castle. Stirling Castle is a scheduled monument, and is now a tourist attraction managed by Historic Environment Scotland.

== History ==
=== Early history ===
Castle Hill, on which Stirling Castle is built, forms part of the Stirling Sill, a formation of quartz-dolerite around 350 million years old, which was subsequently modified by glaciation to form a "crag and tail". It is likely that this natural feature was occupied at an early date, as a hill fort is located on Gowan Hill, immediately to the east.

The Romans bypassed Stirling, building a fort at Doune instead, but the rock may have been occupied by the Maeatae at this time. It may later have been a stronghold of the Manaw Gododdin, and has also been identified with a settlement recorded in the 7th and 8th centuries as Urbs Iudeu, where King Penda of Mercia besieged King Oswy of Bernicia in 655. The area came under Pictish control after the defeat of the Northumbrians at the Battle of Dun Nechtain thirty years later. However, there is no archaeological evidence for occupation of Castle Hill before the late medieval period.

Other legends have been associated with Stirling, or "Snowdoun" as it was more poetically known. The 16th-century historian Hector Boece claims in his Historia Gentis Scotorum that the Romans, under Agricola, fortified Stirling, and that Kenneth MacAlpin, traditionally the first King of Scotland, besieged a castle at Stirling during his takeover of the Pictish kingdom in the 9th century. Boece is, however, considered an unreliable historian.

Another chronicler, William Worcester, associated Stirling with the court of the legendary King Arthur. Tradition suggests that St Monenna founded a chapel here, as she is said to have done at Edinburgh Castle, although it is now thought that the legend of Monenna results from a later confusion of early Christian figures, including Modwenna and Moninne.

The first record of Stirling Castle dates from around 1110, when King Alexander I dedicated a chapel there. It appears to have been an established royal centre by this time, as Alexander died here in 1124. During the reign of his successor David I, Stirling became a royal burgh, and the castle an important administration centre. King William I formed a deer park to the south-west of the castle, but after his capture by the English in 1174, he was forced to surrender several castles, including Stirling and Edinburgh Castle, under the Treaty of Falaise. There is no evidence that the English actually occupied the castle, and it was formally handed back by Richard I of England in 1189. Stirling continued to be a favoured royal residence, with William himself dying there in 1214, and Alexander III laying out the New Park, for deer hunting, in the 1260s.

=== Wars of Independence ===
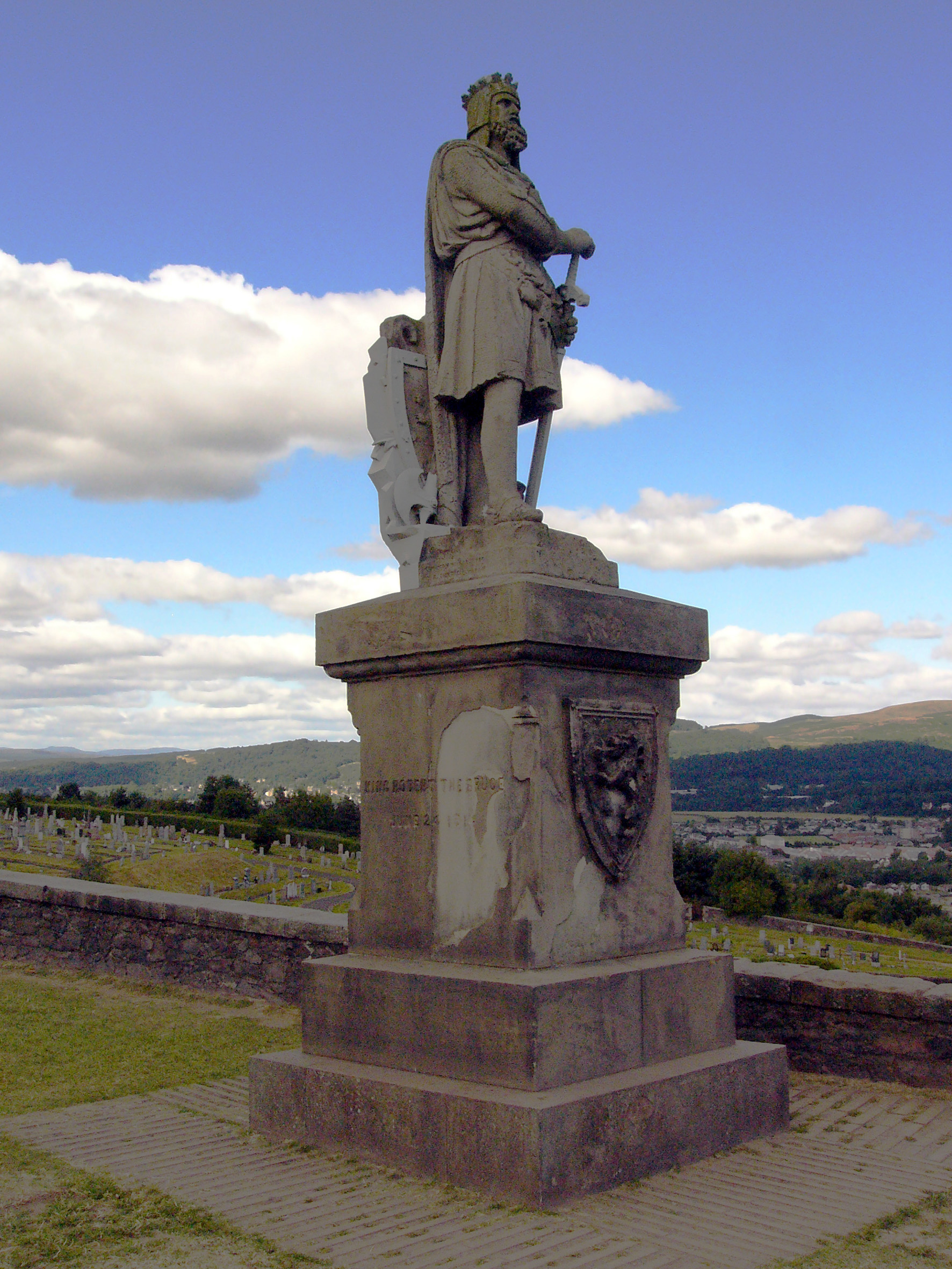
Statue of Robert the Bruce on the castle esplanade

Stirling remained a centre of royal administration until the death of Alexander III in 1286. His passing triggered a succession crisis, with Edward I of England invited to arbitrate between competing claimants. Edward came north in 1291, demanding that Stirling, along with the other royal castles, be put under his control during the arbitration. Edward gave judgement in favour of John Balliol, hoping he would be a "puppet" ruler, but John refused to obey Edward's demands.

In 1296, Edward invaded Scotland, beginning the Wars of Scottish Independence, which would last for the next 60 years. The English found Stirling Castle abandoned and empty, and set about occupying this key site. They were dislodged the following year, after the victory of Andrew Moray and William Wallace at the Battle of Stirling Bridge. Many of the garrison were killed during the battle, after which the English commanders William FitzWarin and Marmaduke Thweng retreated into the castle. However, they were quickly starved into surrender by the Scots.

Next summer, the castle changed hands again, being abandoned by the Scots after the English victory at Falkirk. Edward strengthened the castle, but it was besieged in 1299 by forces including Robert Bruce. King Edward failed to relieve the garrison, who were forced to surrender.

By 1303, the English again held the upper hand, and Stirling was the last remaining castle in Scottish hands. Edward's army arrived in April 1304, with at least 17 siege engines. The Scots, under William Oliphant, surrendered on 20 July, but part of the garrison were ordered back into the castle by Edward, as he had not yet deployed his latest engine, "Warwolf". Warwolf is believed to have been a large trebuchet, which destroyed the castle's gatehouse. Although Edward's victory seemed complete, he was dead by 1307, and Robert Bruce was now King of Scots. By 1313, only Stirling, Roxburgh, Edinburgh and Berwick castles were held by the English. Edward Bruce, the king's brother, laid siege to Stirling, which was held by Sir Philip Mowbray. After several months, on 24 June 1313, Mowbray proposed a bargain: that he would surrender the castle, if it were not relieved within one year by the English. Edward Bruce agreed, and withdrew. Scottish historian Patrick Fraser Tytler would describe Mowbray's offer, five centuries later, as "a truce involving conditions which ought on no account to have been accepted." As Tytler noted, the effect "was to check the ardour of the Scots in that career of success, which was now rapidly leading to the complete deliverance of their country; it gave the King of England a whole year to assemble the strength of his dominions... We need not wonder, then, that Bruce was highly incensed, on hearing that, without consulting him, his brother had agreed to Mowbray's proposals." The following summer, the English duly headed north, led by Edward II, to save the castle. On 23 June 1314, King Robert's forces met the English at the Battle of Bannockburn, within sight of the castle walls. The resulting English defeat was decisive. King Edward attempted to take refuge in the castle, but Mowbray was determined to keep to his word, and the English were forced to flee. Mowbray handed over the castle, changing sides himself in the process. King Robert ordered the castle to be slighted; its defences destroyed to prevent reoccupation by the English.

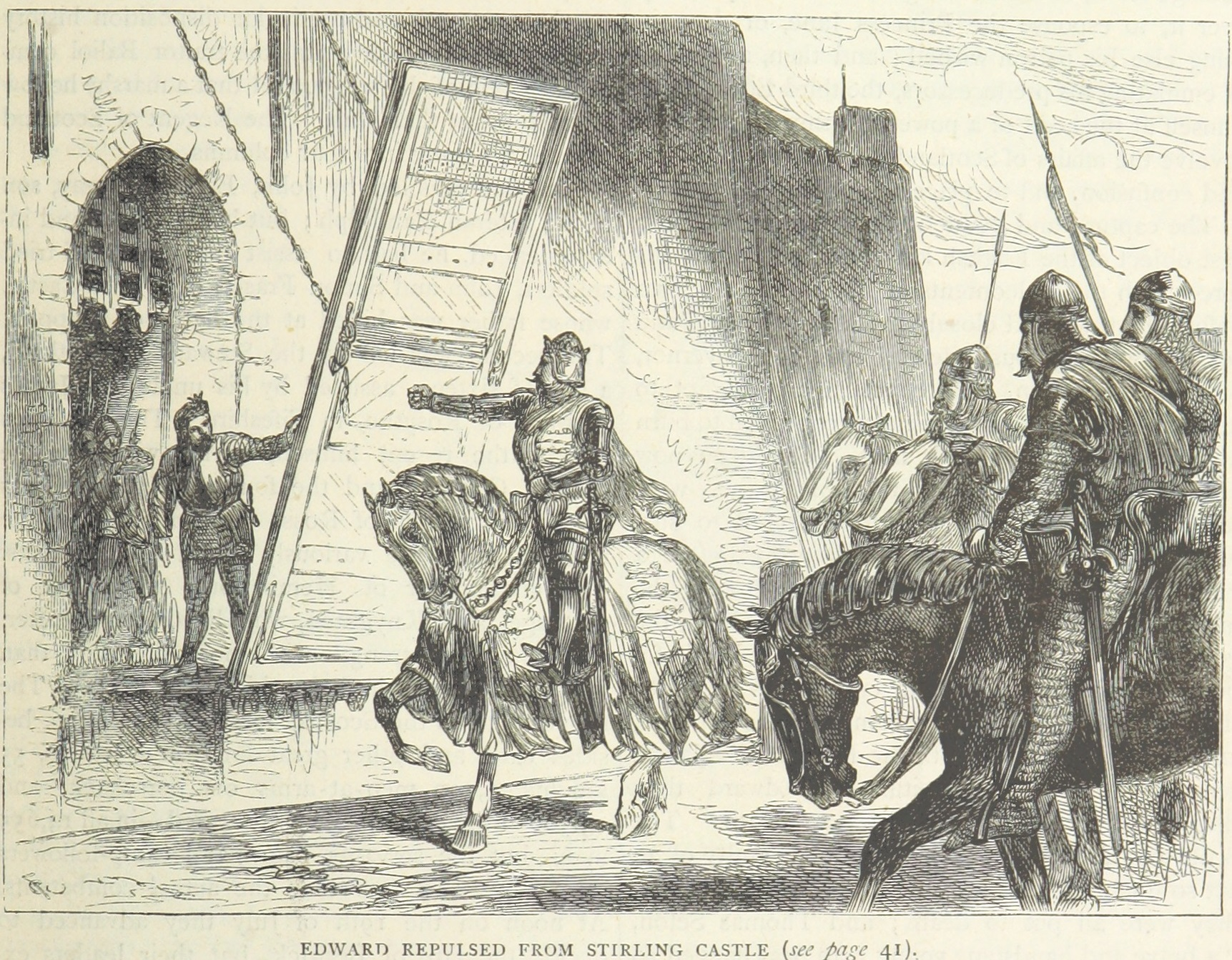
Mowbray refuses to let Edward II into the castle.

The war was not over, however. The second War of Scottish Independence saw the English in control of Stirling Castle by 1336, when Thomas Rokeby was the commander, and extensive works were carried out, still largely in timber rather than stone. Andrew Murray attempted a siege in 1337, when guns may have been used for one of the first times in Scotland. Robert Stewart, the future King Robert II, retook Stirling in a siege during 1341–1342. Maurice Murray was appointed as its keeper, who in the words of Andrew of Wyntoun "inforsyt it grettumly, for riche he was and full mychty" (enforced it greatly, for rich he was and full mighty). In 1360, Robert de Forsyth was appointed governor of Stirling Castle, an office he passed on to his son John and grandson William, who was governor in 1399.

=== Early Stuarts ===
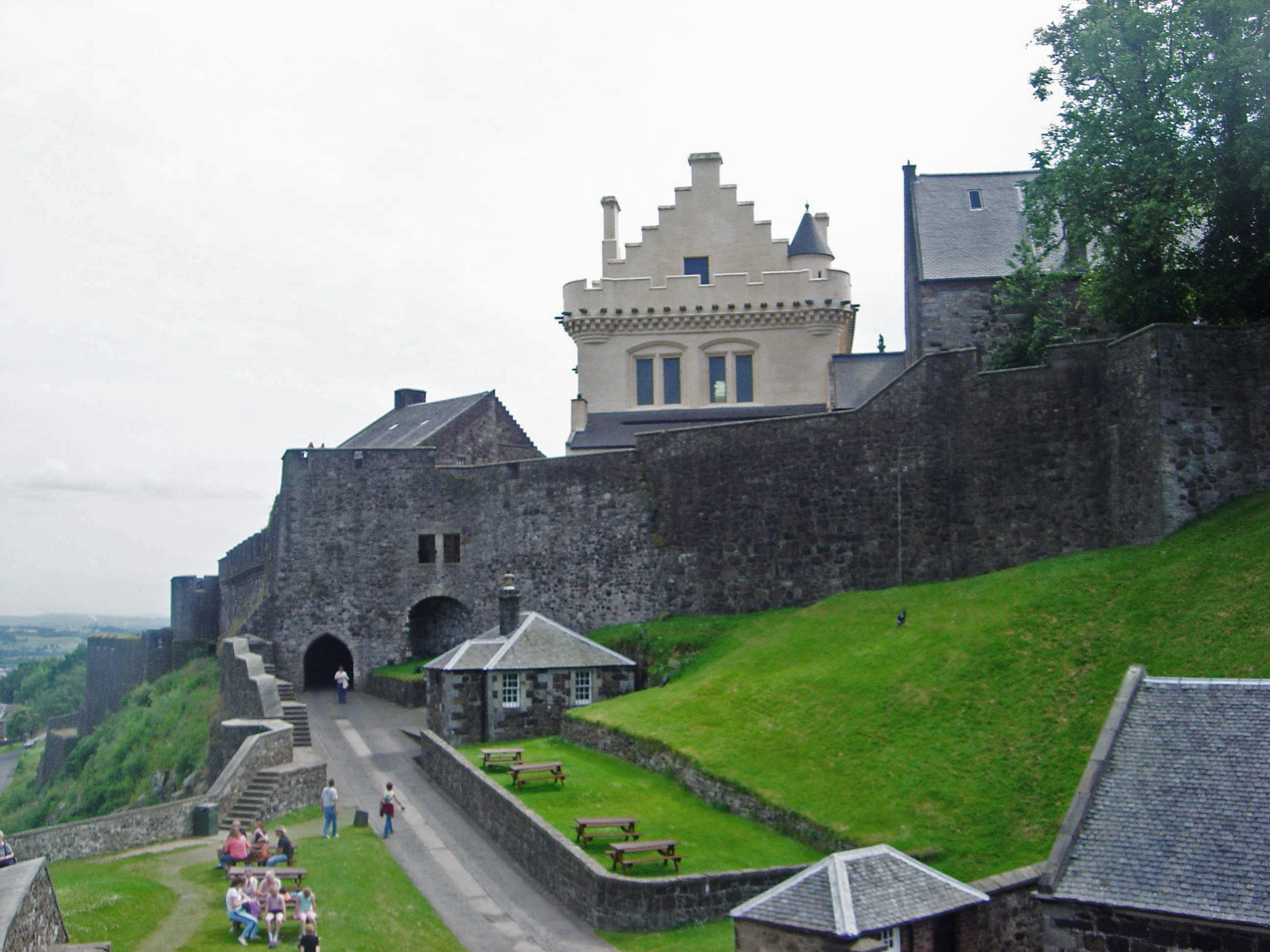
The north gate of the castle, at the lower left, is probably the oldest part of the castle, dating partly from the 1380s.

Under the early Stewart kings Robert II (reigned 1371–1390) and Robert III (reigned 1390–1406), the earliest surviving parts of the castle were built. Robert Stewart, Earl of Menteith, Regent of Scotland as brother of Robert III, undertook works on the north and south gates. The present north gate is built on these foundations of the 1380s, the earliest surviving masonry in the castle. In 1424, Stirling Castle was part of the jointure (marriage settlement) given to James I's wife Joan Beaufort, establishing a tradition which later monarchs continued.

After James' murder in 1437, Joan took shelter here with her son, the young James II. He hosted a tournament at Stirling on Shrove Tuesday 1449, which included a combat between two teams of three, led by the Burgundian knight Jacques de Lalaing and James Douglas, a brother of the Earl of Douglas. The Burgundian knights were the victors. In 1452, it was at Stirling Castle that James stabbed and killed William, 8th Earl of Douglas, when the latter refused to end a potentially treasonous alliance with John of Islay, Earl of Ross and Alexander Lindsay, 4th Earl of Crawford. James III (reigned 1460–1488) was born here, and later undertook works to the gardens and the chapel royal. The manufacture of artillery in the castle is recorded in 1475. James' wife, Margaret of Denmark, died in Stirling Castle in 1486, and two years later James himself died at the Battle of Sauchieburn, fought over almost the same ground as the Battle of Bannockburn, just to the south of the castle.

=== Renaissance palace ===
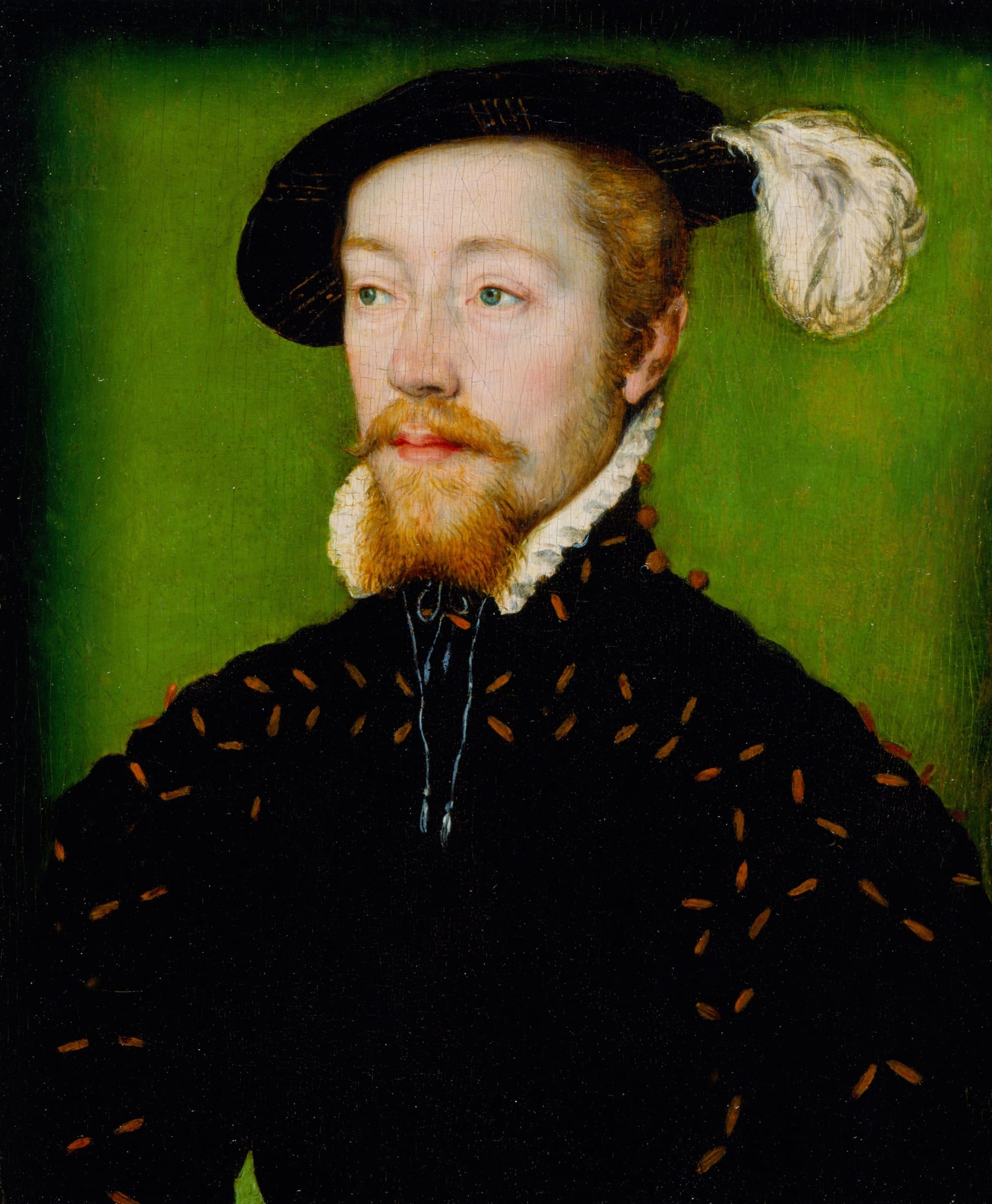
James V, builder of the Royal Palace, by Corneille de Lyon

Almost all the present buildings in the castle were constructed between 1490 and 1600, when Stirling was developed as a principal royal centre by the Stewart kings James IV, James V and James VI. The architecture of these new buildings shows an eclectic mix of English, French and German influences, reflecting the international ambitions of the Stewart dynasty.

James IV (reigned 1488–1513) kept a full Renaissance court, including artists and alchemists. Perkin Warbeck was a guest at Stirling in November 1495. James IV sought to establish a palace of European standing at Stirling. He undertook building works at the royal residences of Edinburgh, Falkland and Linlithgow, but the grandest works were at Stirling, and include the King's Old Building, the Great Hall, and the Forework. He also renovated the chapel royal, one of two churches within the castle at this time, and in 1501 received approval from Pope Alexander VI for the establishment of a college of priests. The Forework, of which little now remains, was derived from French military architecture, although military details were added more for style than for defence. A new portcullis was painted with red lead and linseed oil. The gardener, George Campbell, built archery butts next to the stables in 1504. James IV played tennis at Stirling with the Spanish ambassador, Pedro de Ayala.

If a satirical account in two poems by the poet William Dunbar is based on facts, the castle walls may have been the site of an attempt at human-powered flight, c.1509, by the Italian alchemist and abbot of Tongland, John Damian. The Captain of the Castle Andrew Aytoun kept an alchemist called Caldwell maintaining a furnace for "quinta essencia", the mythical fifth element, at the castle.

The building works begun by James IV had not been completed at the time of his death at the Battle of Flodden. His successor, James V (reigned 1513–1542), was crowned in the chapel royal, and grew up in the castle under the guardianship of Lord Erskine. In 1515, the Regent Albany brought 7,000 men to Stirling to wrest control of the young king from his mother, Margaret Tudor. James V as monarch was said to have travelled in disguise under the name "Gudeman of Ballengeich", after the road running under the eastern wall of the castle. Ballengeich means "windy pass" in Gaelic. In 1533 a priest James Nicholson was in charge of the building fabric, and he also fed cranes, herons, peacocks, and bitterns for the king's table.

James V continued and expanded his father's building programme, creating the centrepiece of the castle, the Royal Palace, built under the direction of Sir James Hamilton of Finnart and masons brought from France. James V died in 1542, leaving unfinished work to be completed by his widow, Mary of Guise. His infant daughter, Mary, Queen of Scots, was brought to Stirling Castle for safety in July 1543 and crowned in the chapel royal on 9 September 1543. There was war with England, now known as the Rough Wooing. Mary was brought up at Stirling Castle, until she was sent to Inchmahome Priory, and then to France in 1548. Artillery fortifications were added to the south approach of the castle including the 'French Spur', and these form the basis of the present Outer Defences. Guise employed an Italian military engineer called Lorenzo Pomarelli. From 1534 to 1584 Michael Gardiner was in charge of the artillery.

Queen Mary returned to Scotland in 1561, and visited Stirling Castle frequently. She nursed Henry Stuart, Lord Darnley, through an illness here in 1565, and the two were soon married. Their son, James VI, was baptised here in December 1566. The celebrations included fireworks, an assault on a mock castle, and a masque designed by Bastian Pagez. Darnley was already estranged from the Queen and did not attend although he was resident at the castle. James' guardian, the Earl of Mar, was made hereditary governor of the castle in 1566. Mary was travelling from Stirling when she was abducted by the Earl of Bothwell, beginning the chain of events that led to her forced abdication and her flight to England. When Mary escaped from Lochleven Castle in May 1568, the Earl of Mar was ordered step up security at Stirling around the king and expel from the castle all but his closest friends and relatives.

The young King James was crowned in July 1567 in the nearby Church of the Holy Rude, and grew up within the castle walls in the care of Annabell Murray, Countess of Mar and under the tutelage of the humanist scholar George Buchanan. A tennis court was built of timber for the king in 1576. Frequently used as a pawn in the struggles between his regents and the supporters of Mary, the young king was closely guarded. Stirling became the base for James' supporters, while those nobles who wished to see Queen Mary restored gathered at Edinburgh, under William Kirkcaldy of Grange. Grange led a raid on Stirling in 1571, attempting to round up the Queen's enemies, but failed to gain control of the castle or the King.

The keeper of the Castle, Alexander Erskine of Gogar was ejected by supporters of Regent Morton in April 1578, after his son was fatally wounded during a struggle at the gate. The rebellious Earls of Mar and Angus seized the castle in April 1584, but surrendered and fled to England when Colonel Stewart arrived with an army. When they returned in the following year, the royal favourite James Stewart, Earl of Arran fled to a boat on the Forth via the castle's northern sally port. James VI surrendered on 4 November, although they proclaimed their loyalty to him.

In December 1593, Anne of Denmark decided to come to Stirling for the birth of her first child, and James ordered the palace which was in "ruin and decay" to be repaired. Prince Henry was born in the castle in 1594, and the present Chapel Royal was constructed for his baptism on 30 August. Probably built by William Schaw, the chapel completed the quadrangle of the Inner Close. Like his predecessors Henry spent his childhood here under the 2nd Earl of Mar, until the Union of the Crowns of 1603, when his father succeeded as King of England and the royal family left for London.

=== Military fortress ===
After their departure, Stirling's role as a royal residence declined, and it became principally a military centre. It was used as a prison for persons of rank during the 17th century, and saw few visits by the monarch. The architect James Murray restored roofs and facilities of the castle for the return of James VI & I to Scotland, who stayed in Stirling during July 1617. From 1625, extensive preparations were made for the anticipated visit of the new king, Charles I, including works to the gardens and painting of the Chapel Royal. Charles did not come to Scotland until 1633, and only stayed in the castle briefly.

Following the execution of Charles I, the Scots crowned his son Charles II, and he became the last reigning monarch to stay here, living at the castle in 1650. The Royalist forces were defeated at Dunbar by those of Oliver Cromwell, and the King marched south to defeat at Worcester. General Monck laid siege to the castle on 6 August 1651, erecting gun platforms in the adjacent churchyard. After the garrison mutinied, Colonel William Conyngham was obliged to surrender on 14 August. Damage done during the siege can still be seen on the church and the Great Hall.

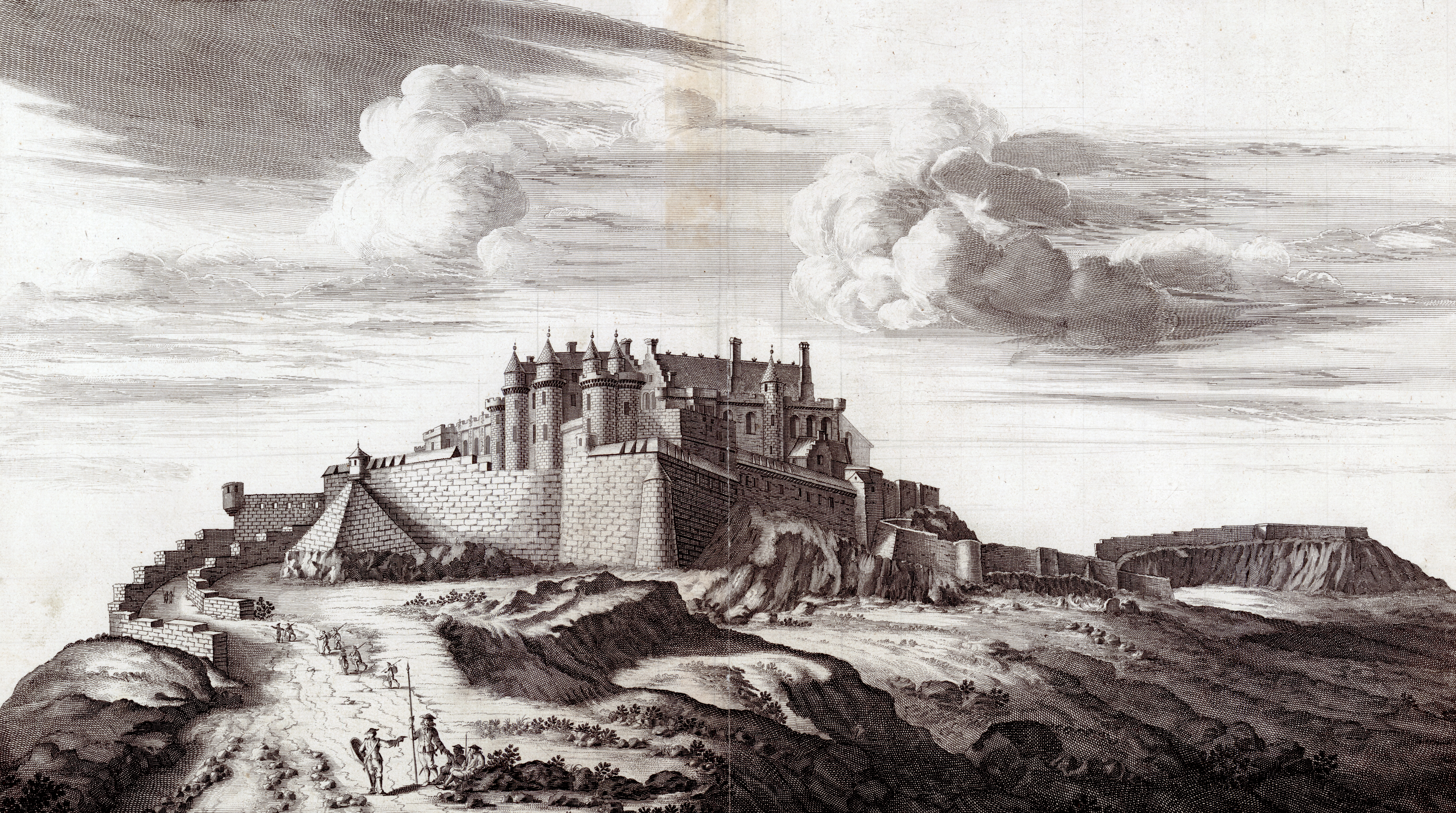
Stirling Castle, drawn by John Slezer in 1693, and showing James IV's now-demolished Forework

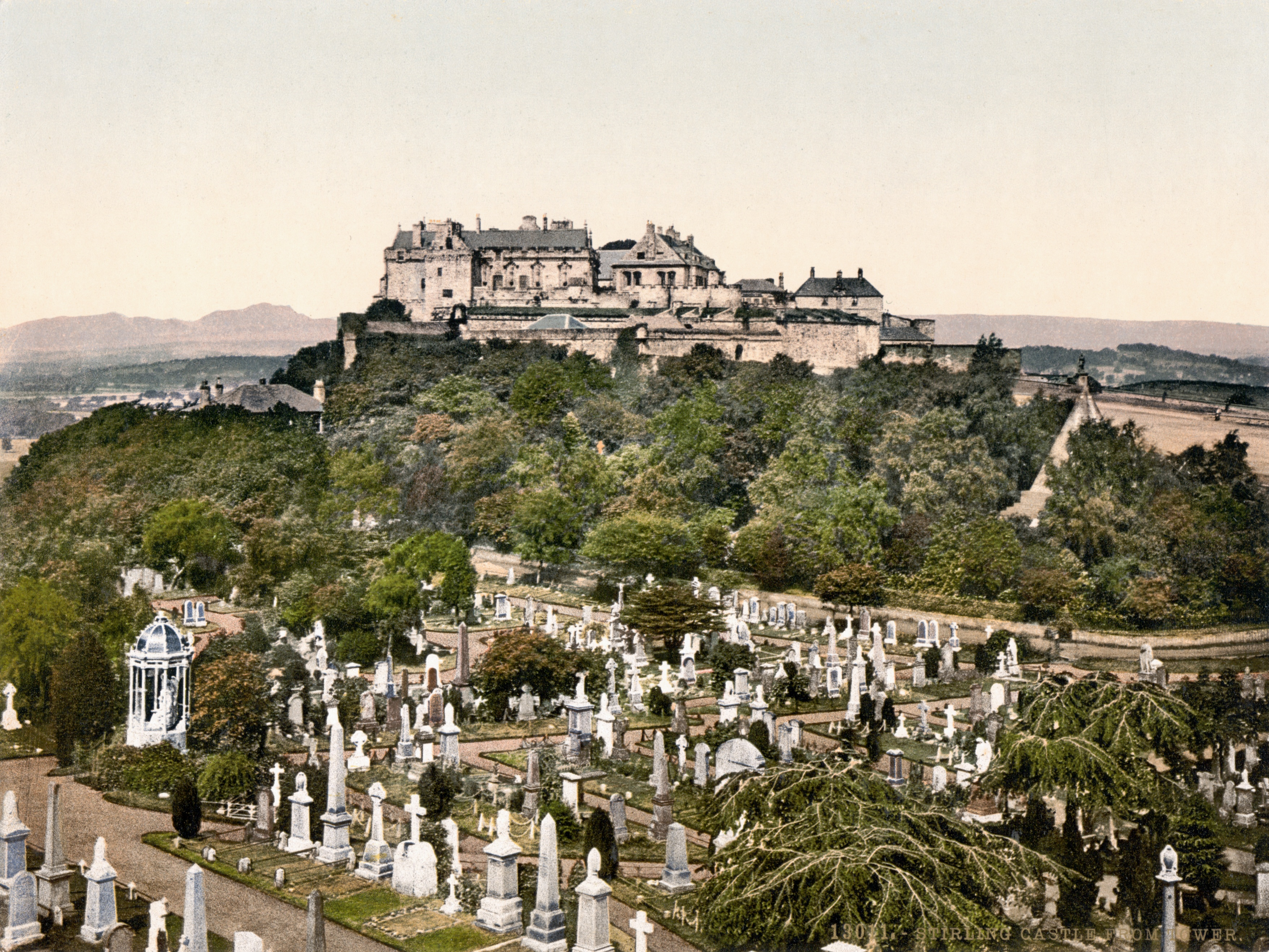
Stirling Castle in 1900

After The Restoration of Charles II, the Earl of Mar was restored as governor, and the castle was frequently used as a prison, housing several Covenanters. James, Duke of Albany, later King James VII of Scotland and II of England, visited the castle in 1681. During this time, the castle's military role became increasingly important, a powder magazine being built in the castle gardens, and a formal garrison installed from 1685. At the accession of King George I in 1714, John Erskine, 6th Earl of Mar was deprived of the governorship, as well as the post of Scottish Secretary. In response, he raised the standard of James Stuart, the "Old Pretender", in the Jacobite rising of 1715. Government troops, under the Duke of Argyll, quickly moved to occupy the fortress, then advanced to Sheriffmuir to block Mar's way. The Battle of Sheriffmuir was inconclusive, but the rising was effectively over. The Jacobite rising of 1745 saw Charles Edward Stuart lead his army of Highlanders past Stirling on the way to Edinburgh. Following the Jacobites' retreat from England, they returned to Stirling in January 1746. The town soon surrendered, but the castle governor, William Blakeney, refused to capitulate. Artillery works were set up on Gowan Hill, but were quickly destroyed by the castle's guns. Despite victory at Falkirk, the Jacobites withdrew north on 1 February.

From 1800 the Castle was owned by the War Office and run as a barracks. Many alterations were made to the Great Hall, which became an accommodation block, to the Chapel Royal, which became a lecture theatre and dining hall, to the King's Old Building, which became an infirmary and to the Royal Palace, which became the Officer's Mess. A number of new buildings were also constructed, including the prison and powder magazine, at the Nether Bailey, in 1810. Queen Victoria visited in 1842, and the Prince of Wales in 1859.

In 1873 a system of recruiting areas based on counties was instituted under the Cardwell Reforms and the barracks became the depot for the 72nd (Highland) Regiment of Foot and the 91st (Argyllshire Highlanders) Regiment of Foot. Following the Childers Reforms, the 91st (Argyllshire Highlanders) Regiment of Foot and the 93rd (Sutherland Highlanders) Regiment of Foot amalgamated to form the Argyll and Sutherland Highlanders with its depot in the barracks in 1881.

=== Twentieth century ===
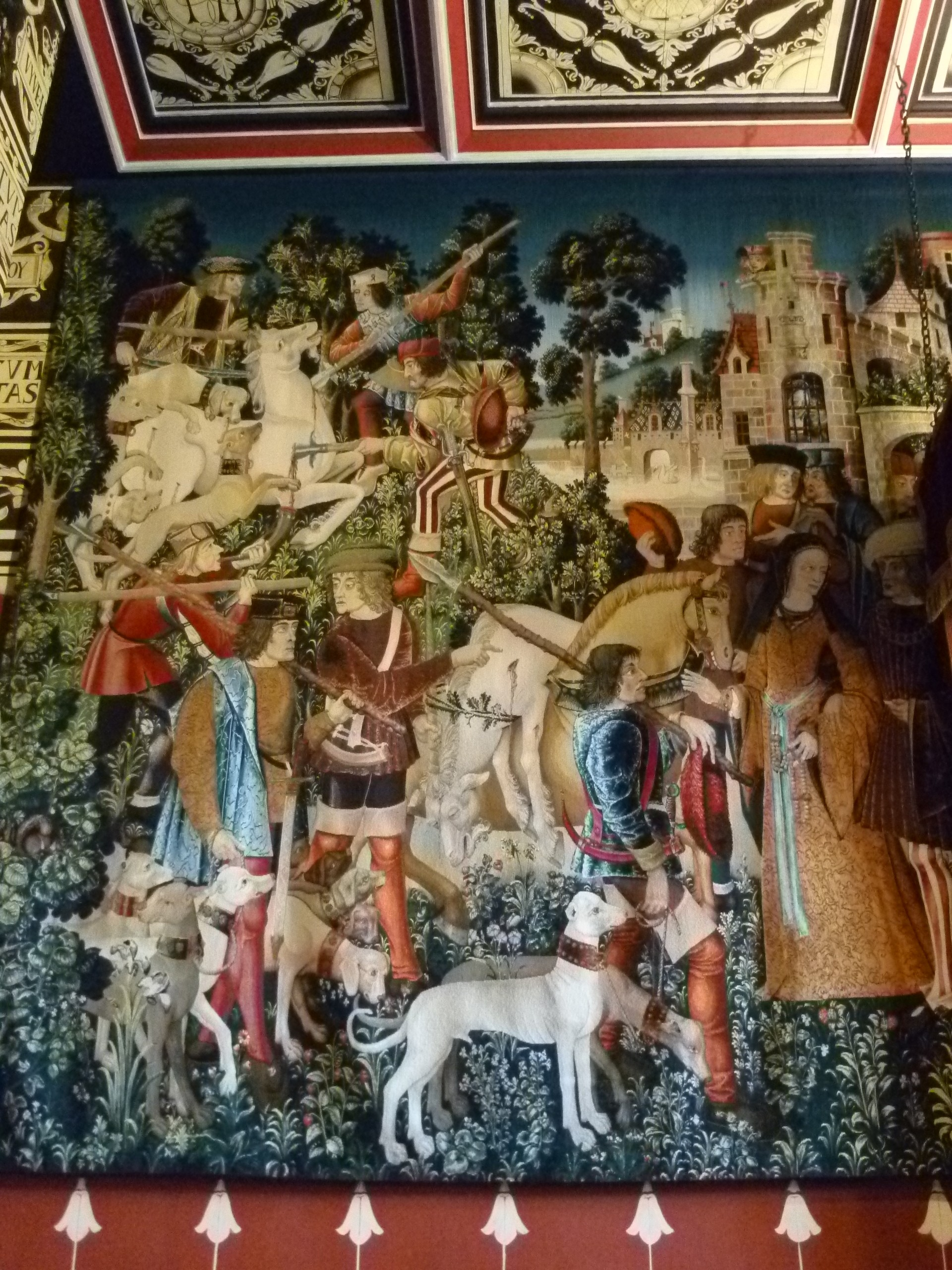
Replica of one of The Hunt of the Unicorn tapestries in the Queen's Presence Chamber

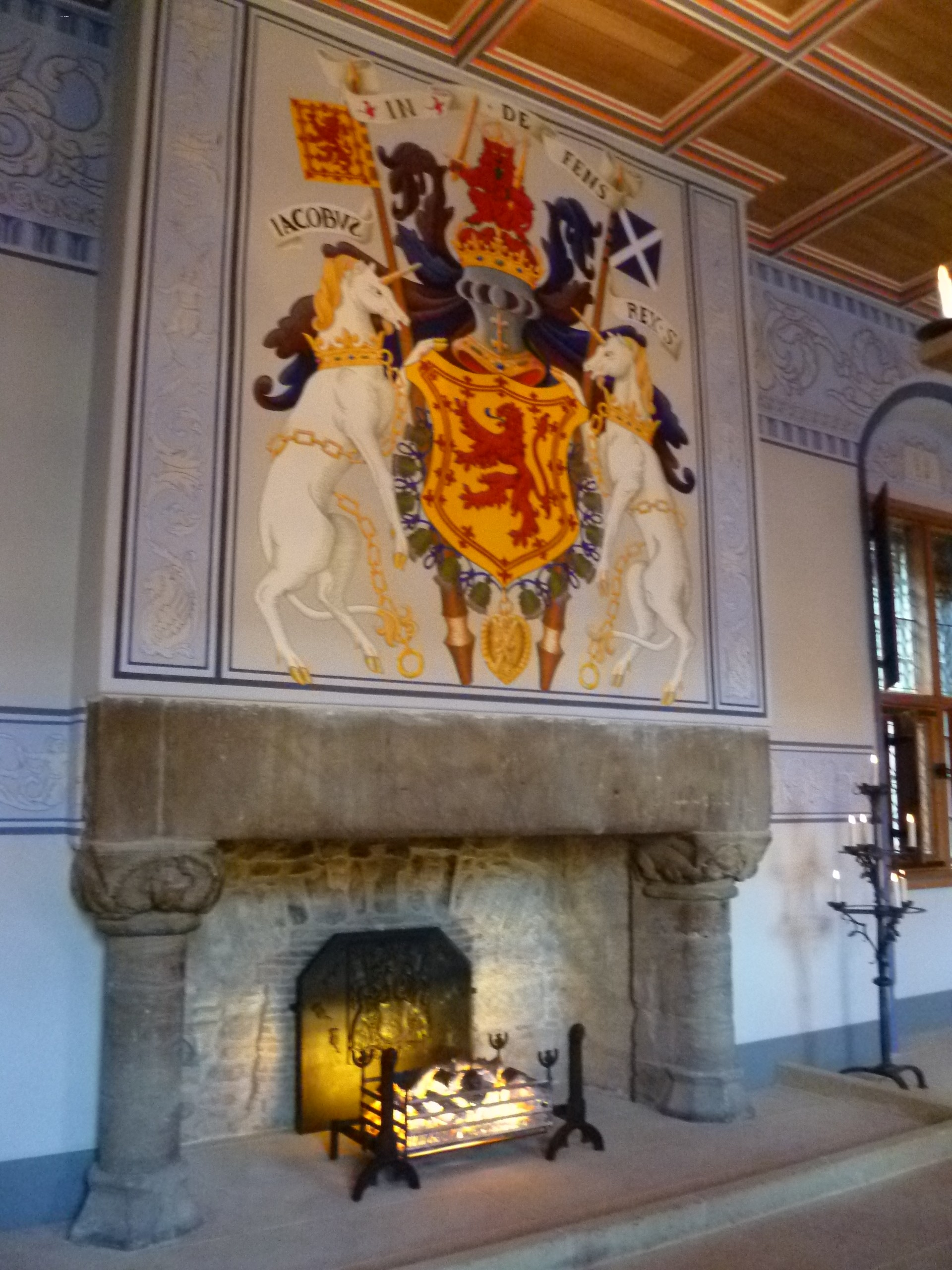
The restored fireplace in the King's Chamber

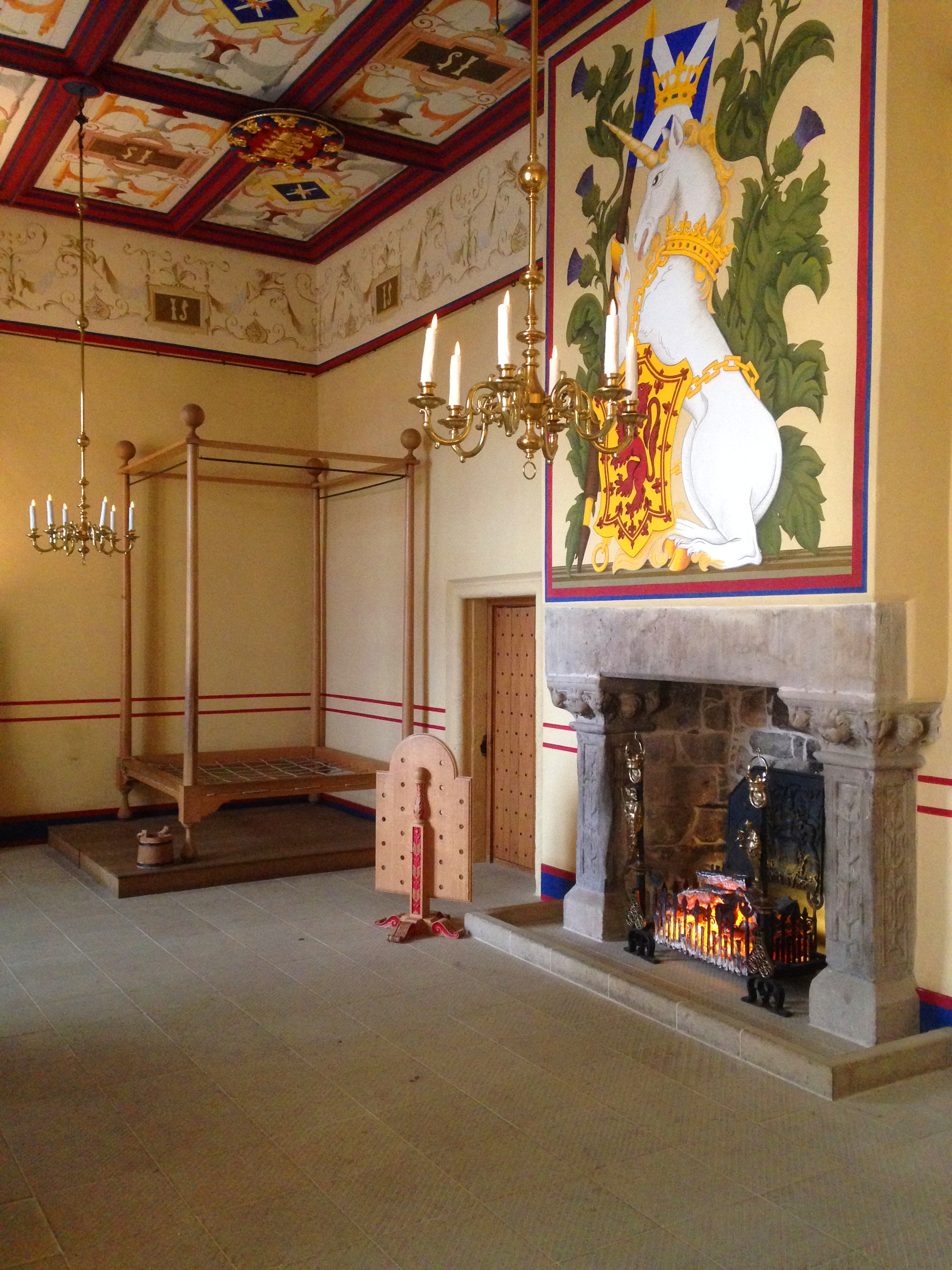
Replica of a bedroom

The Royal Lodgings have now been returned to something approaching their former glory. A major programme of research and re-presentation, lasting ten years and costing £12 million, was completed in summer 2011. Since January 2002, the Tapestry Studio at West Dean College near Chichester in West Sussex has been working on a recreation of The Hunt of the Unicorn tapestries, four of which are now hanging in the restored Queen's Presence Chamber in the Royal Palace. Historians studying the reign of James V believe that a similar series of Unicorn tapestries were part of the royal collection.

The team of weavers visited The Cloisters, part of the Metropolitan Museum of Art, New York City, to inspect the 15th-century originals, and researched medieval weaving techniques, colour palettes and materials. The weavers worked both at the college in West Sussex, and at a studio at Stirling Castle. The project was completed in 2015.

Stirling Castle remains the headquarters of the Argyll and Sutherland Highlanders, although Balaclava Company, the sole surviving unit of the regiment, has been garrisoned at Redford Barracks in Edinburgh since 2014. The regimental museum is also located within the castle.

== Structures and grounds ==
=== Outer defences ===
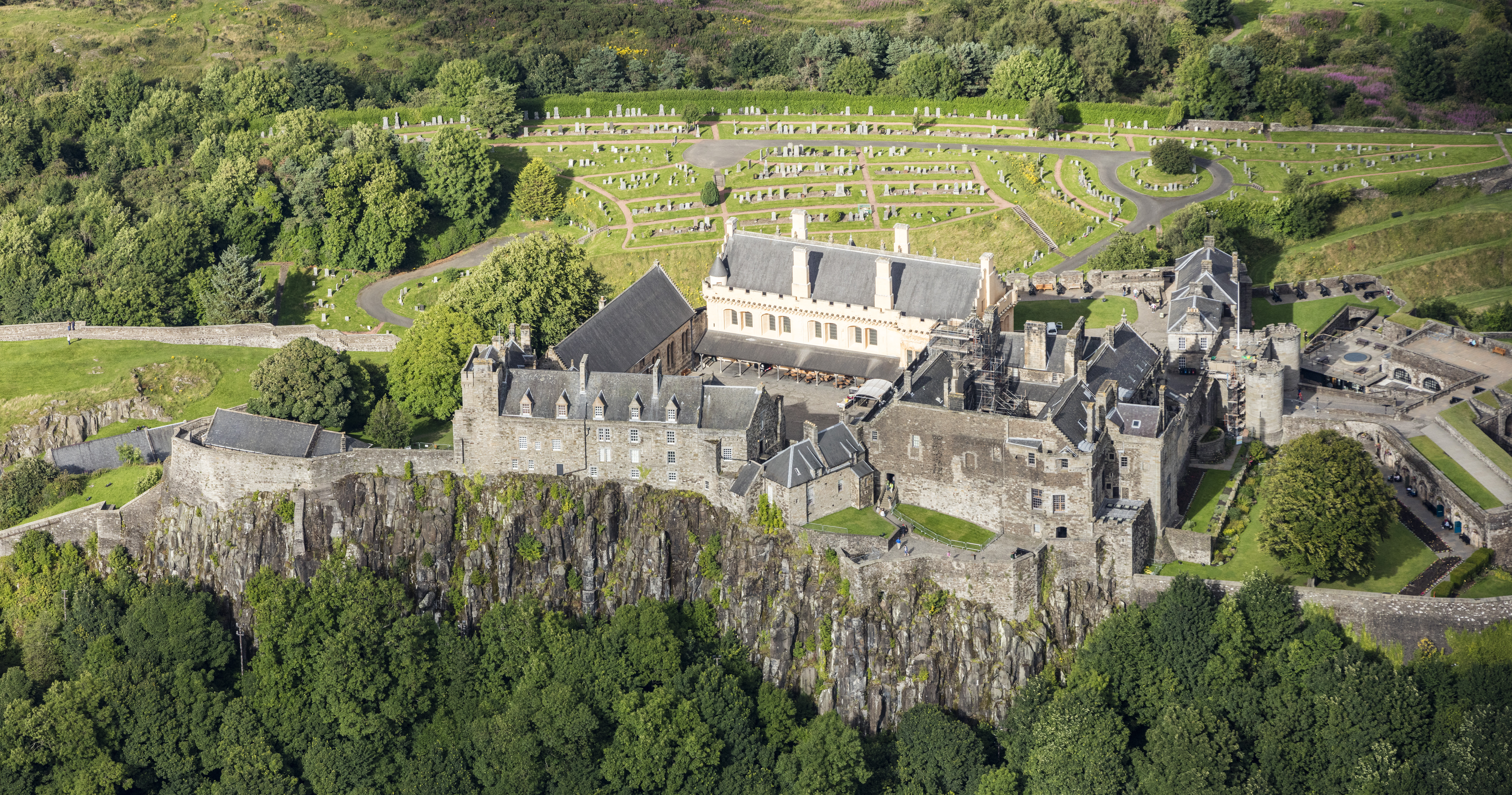
Aerial view of the interior castle

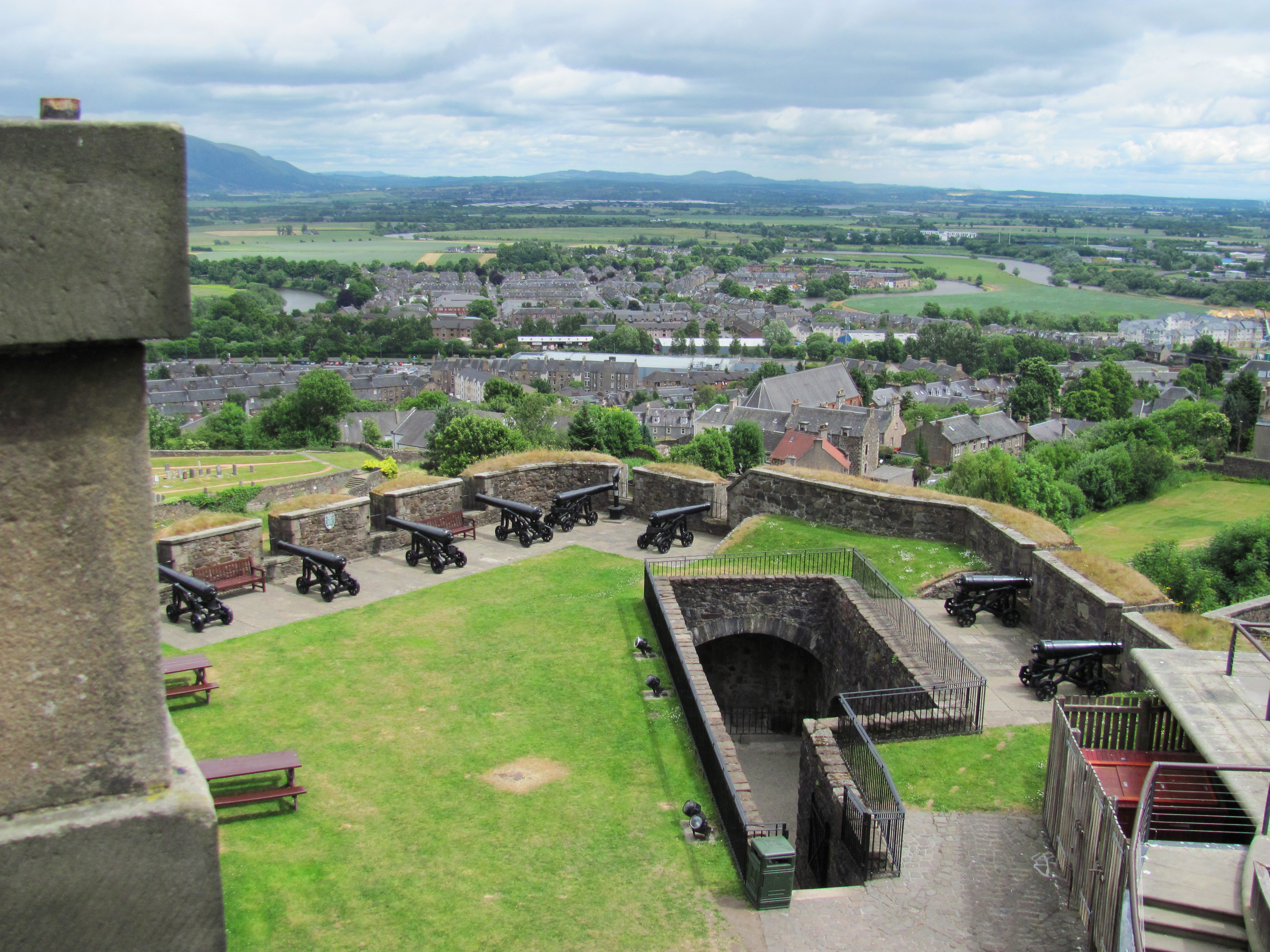
The French Spur, part of the outer defences, looking eastward

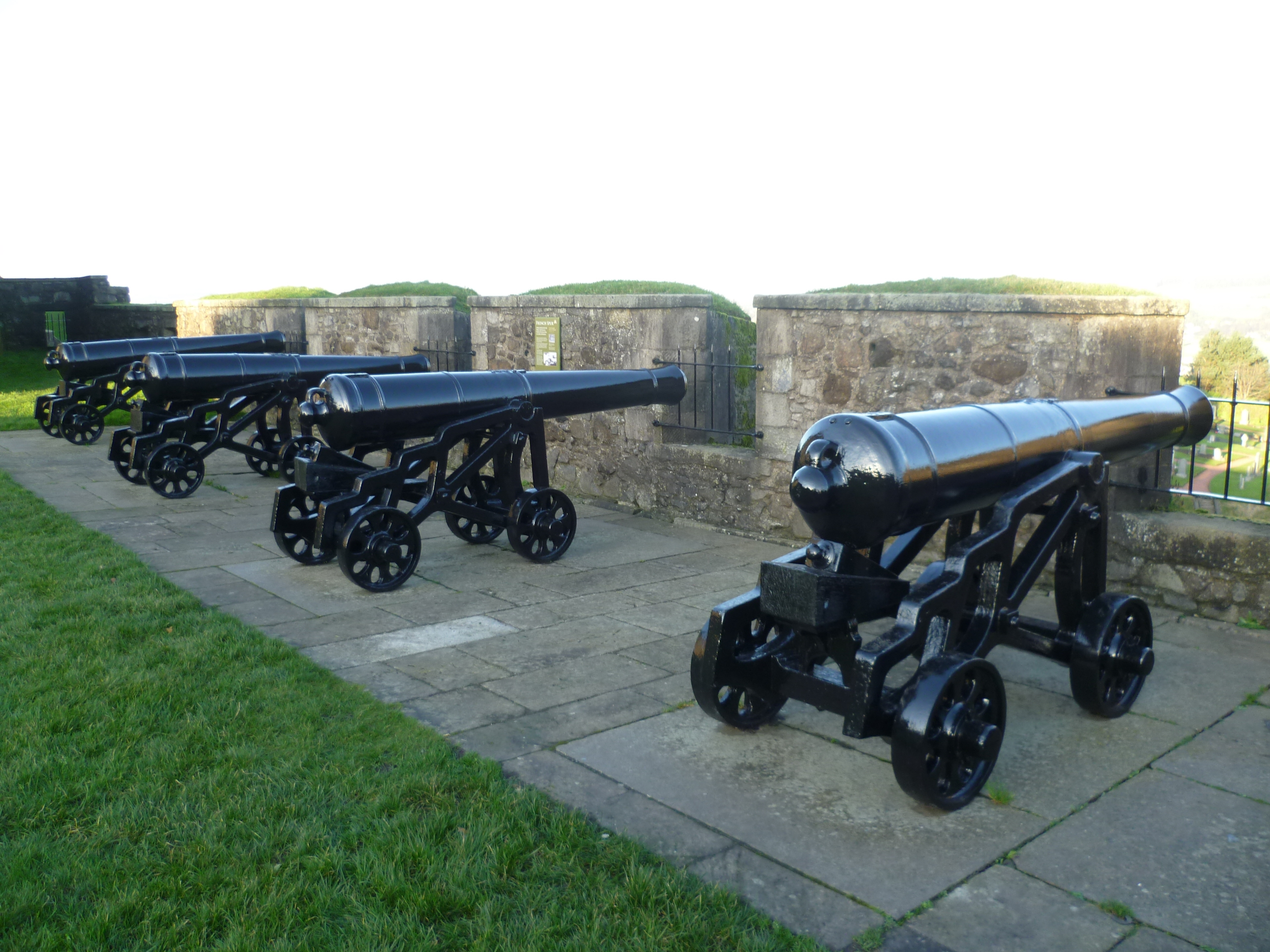
Cannons

The Outer Defences comprise artillery fortifications, and were built in their present form in the 18th century, although some parts, including the French Spur at the east end, date back to the regency of Mary of Guise in the 1550s. The French Spur was originally an ear-shaped bastion known as an orillon, and contained gun emplacements which protected the main spur. This projecting spur was fronted by an earth ramp called a talus, and was entered via a drawbridge over a ditch. Excavations in the 1970s showed that much of the original stonework remains within the 18th-century defences.

Following the attempted Jacobite invasion of 1708, improvements to the castle's defences were ordered as a matter of priority. A scheme of new defences was proposed by Theodore Dury, although this was criticised by one Captain Obryan, who put forward his own, much more expensive, scheme. In the end a compromise was built, and was complete by 1714. The main front wall was extended outwards, to form Guardhouse Square. This created two defensive walls, both of which were fronted by ditches defended by covered firing galleries known as caponiers. One of the caponiers survives and is accessible from Guardhouse Square by a narrow staircase.

To the rear of the walls, chambers called casemates were built to strengthen the wall, and to provide gun emplacements. The French Spur was modified slightly to allow more cannons to be mounted. The buildings within Guardhouse Square date from the 19th century. Outside the castle is the early 19th-century Esplanade, used as a parade ground, and now as a car park and performance space.

=== Forework ===
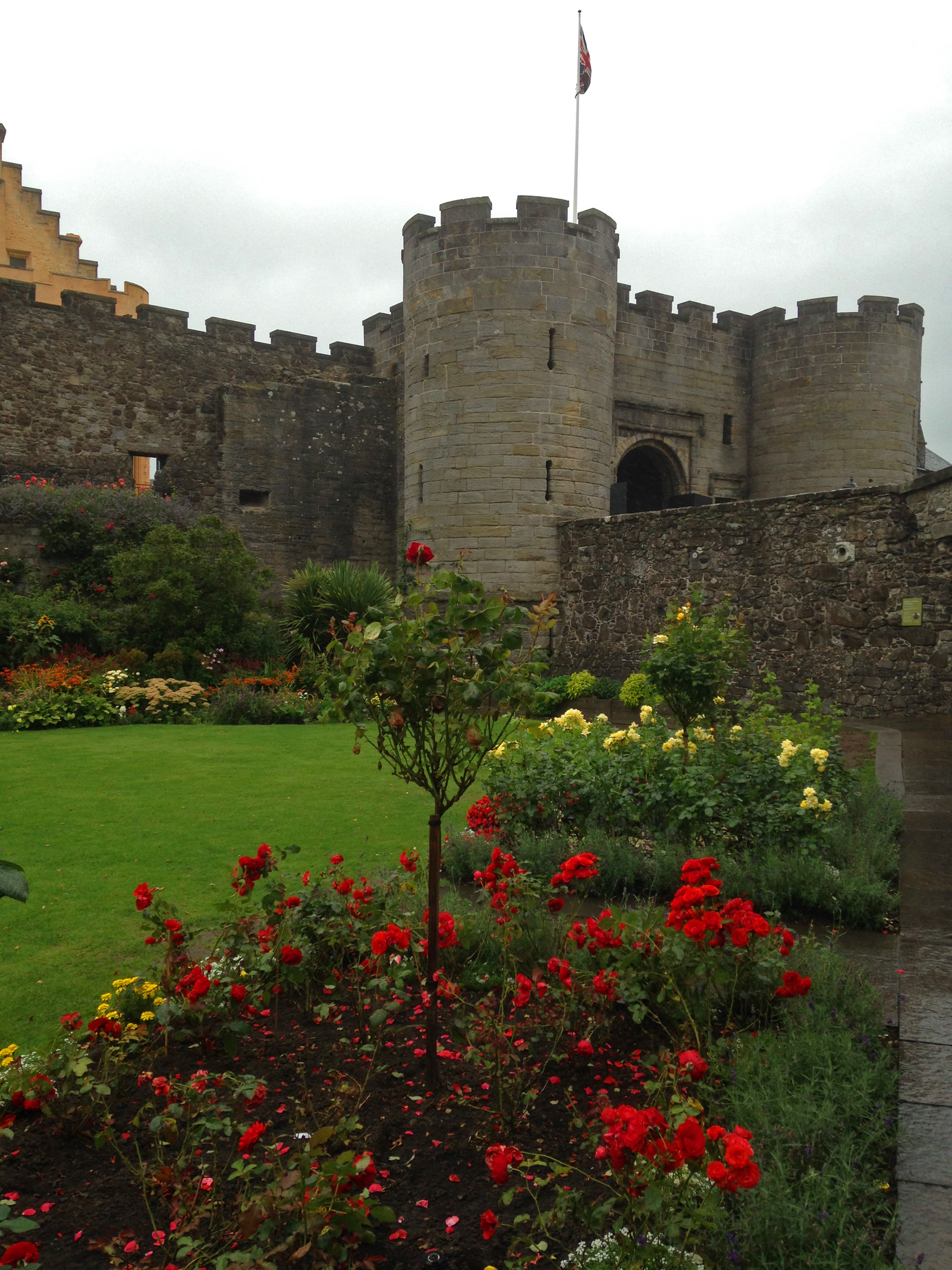
The Forework, entry to the main part of the castle

The gatehouse providing entry from the outer defences to the castle proper was erected by King James IV, and was probably completed around 1506. It originally formed part of a Forework, extending as a curtain wall across the whole width of Castle Hill. At the centre is the gatehouse itself, which now stands to less than half its original height. The round towers at the outer corners rose to conical roofs, with battlements carried around the tops of the towers. These were flanked by more round towers, of which only traces now remain, and mirrored by further rounds at the rear of the gatehouse. The overall design, as drawn by John Slezer in 1693, shows French influence, and has parallels with the forework erected at Linlithgow Palace.

Like the Linlithgow structure, the Forework was probably intended more for show, evoking the "age of chivalry", than for defence, as it would have offered little protection against contemporary artillery. The entrance was via a central passage, flanked by two separate pedestrian passages. This triple arrangement was unusual in its time, and Classical triumphal arches have been suggested as an influence. The gatehouse was dismantled gradually, and was consolidated in its present form in 1810. At each end of the crenellated curtain wall was a rectangular tower. The west tower, known as the Prince's Tower, probably after Henry, Prince of Scotland, survives to its full height, and is now attached to the later palace. At the east end, the Elphinstone Tower contained a kitchen and possibly an officer's lodging. It was cut down to form a gun battery, probably in the early 18th century when the Outer Defences were rebuilt.

=== Outer Close ===
Within the Forework is a courtyard known as the Outer Close. To the south-east are Georgian military buildings; the late 18th-century Main Guard House, and the early 19th-century Fort Major's House. The early North Gate, giving access to the Nether Bailey, contained the original castle kitchens, which were probably linked to the Great Hall. The Great Kitchen which is now visible was constructed later, against the east wall of the castle. However, in 1689 these rooms were infilled with rubble to reinforce gun emplacements, known as the Grand Battery, which were built on top of the kitchen's vaults. Excavations in the 1920s ascertained the extent of the surviving rooms, and the vaults were reconstructed in 1929. The small building above the North Gate is traditionally said to have been a mint, known in Scots as the Cunzie Hoose or "coining house". To the west of the Outer Close, the main parts of the castle are arranged around the quadrangular Inner Close: the Royal Palace to the south, the King's Old Building on the west, the Chapel Royal to the north, and the Great Hall to the east.

=== King's Old Building ===
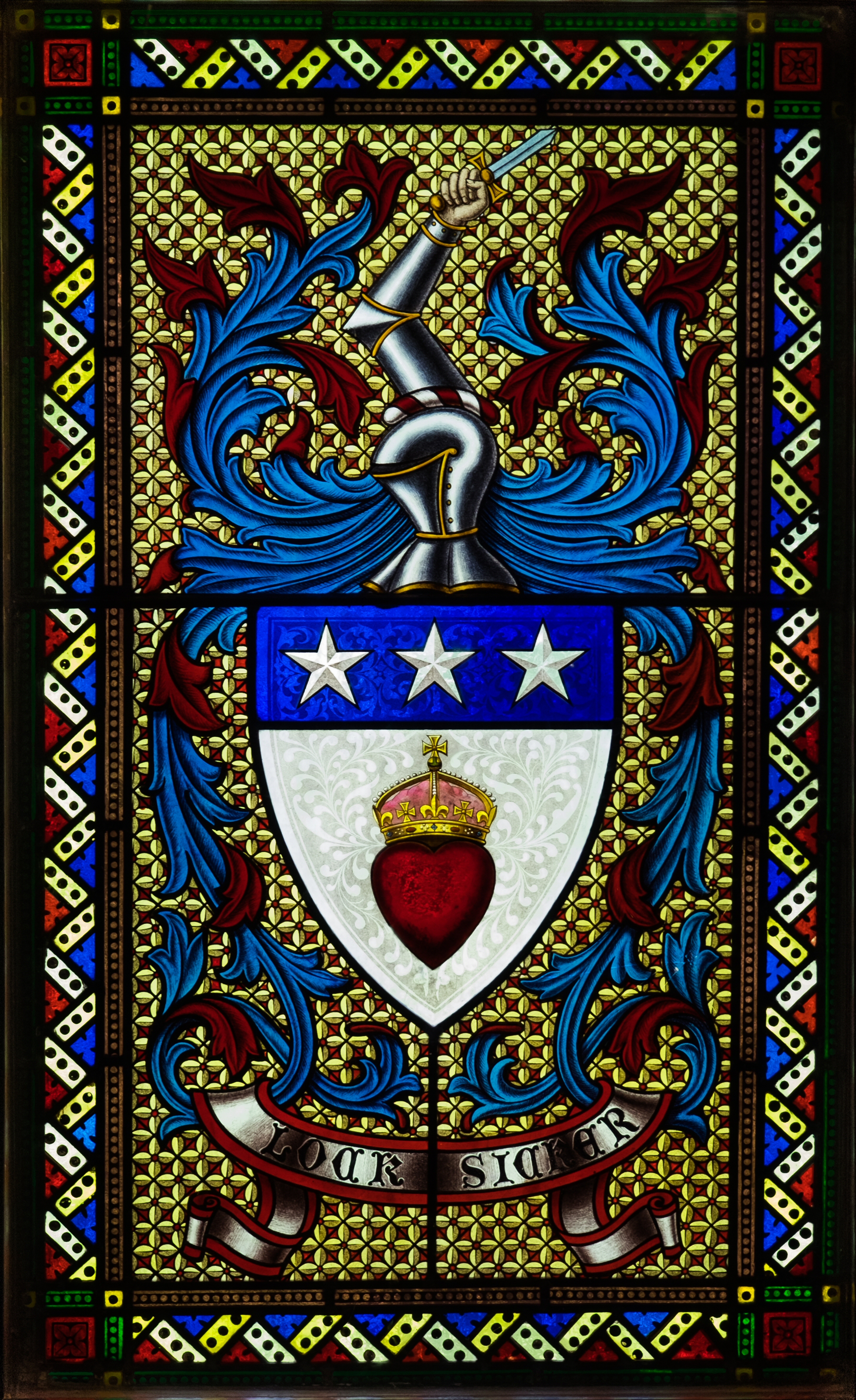
The arms of the Earl of Douglas stained glass in the King's Old Building

The oldest part of the Inner Close is the King's Old Building, located on the western side and completed around 1497. It was begun as a new residential range by James IV, and originally comprised an L-shaped building. The principal rooms were on the first floor, over cellars, and included two chambers with wide open views to the west, although the interiors have been much altered. The projecting stair tower has an octagonal upper section, which was copied for a second, later stair tower on the same building.

In 1855, the north end of the building burned down, and was rebuilt in a Baronial style by the architect and historian Robert William Billings. At the southwest end of the range is a linking building, once used as kitchens, which is on a different alignment to both the King's Old Building and the adjacent Royal Palace. It has been suggested that this is an earlier 15th-century structure, dating from the reign of James I. Excavations within this building in 1998 revealed burials, suggesting that this may have been the site of a church or chapel.

=== Great Hall ===
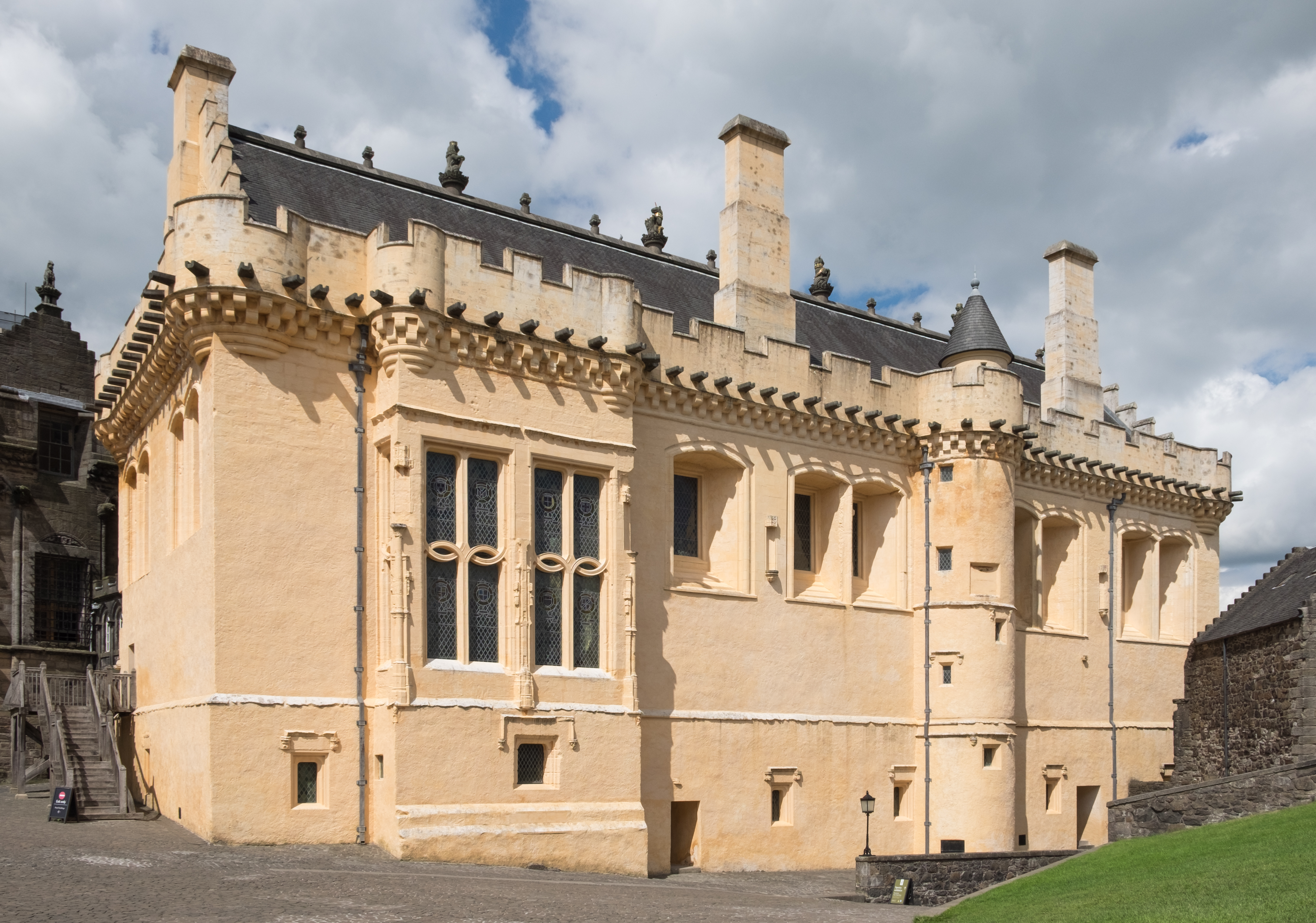
The Great Hall following restoration

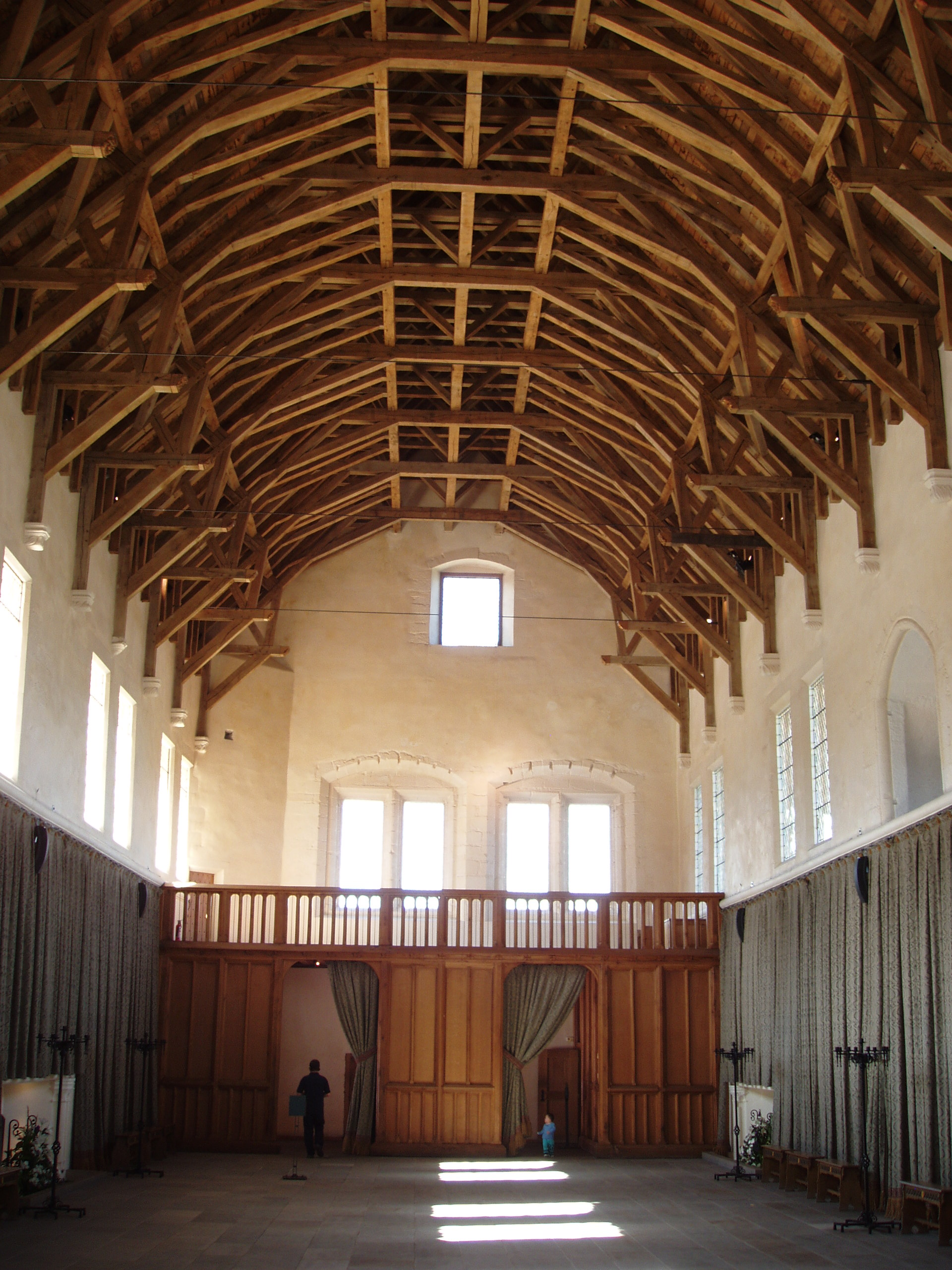
The interior of the Great Hall facing north

On the east side of the Inner Close is the Great Hall, or Parliament Hall. This was built by James IV following on from the completion of the King's Old Building in 1497, and was being plastered by 1503. Described as "the grandest secular building erected in Scotland in the late Middle Ages", it represents the first example of Renaissance-influenced royal architecture in that country.

It was worked on by a number of English craftsmen, and incorporates some English design ideas, being comparable to Edward IV's hall at Eltham Palace in Kent, built in the late 1470s. It includes Renaissance details, such as the intersecting tracery on the windows, within a conventional medieval plan. Inside are five fireplaces, and large side windows lighting the dais end, where the king would be seated. It is 42 by 14.25 m (137.8 by 46.8 ft) across.

The original hammerbeam roof was removed in 1800, along with the decorative crenellated parapet, when the hall was subdivided to form barracks. Two floors and five cross-walls were inserted, and the windows were altered accordingly. As early as 1893, calls were being made for the restoration of the Great Hall, but it was not until the army left in 1965 that the opportunity arose. It was agreed that a historically correct restoration could be achieved, and works began which were only completed in 1999. The hammerbeam roof and parapet were replaced, windows reinstated, and the outer walls were limewashed.

=== Royal Palace ===
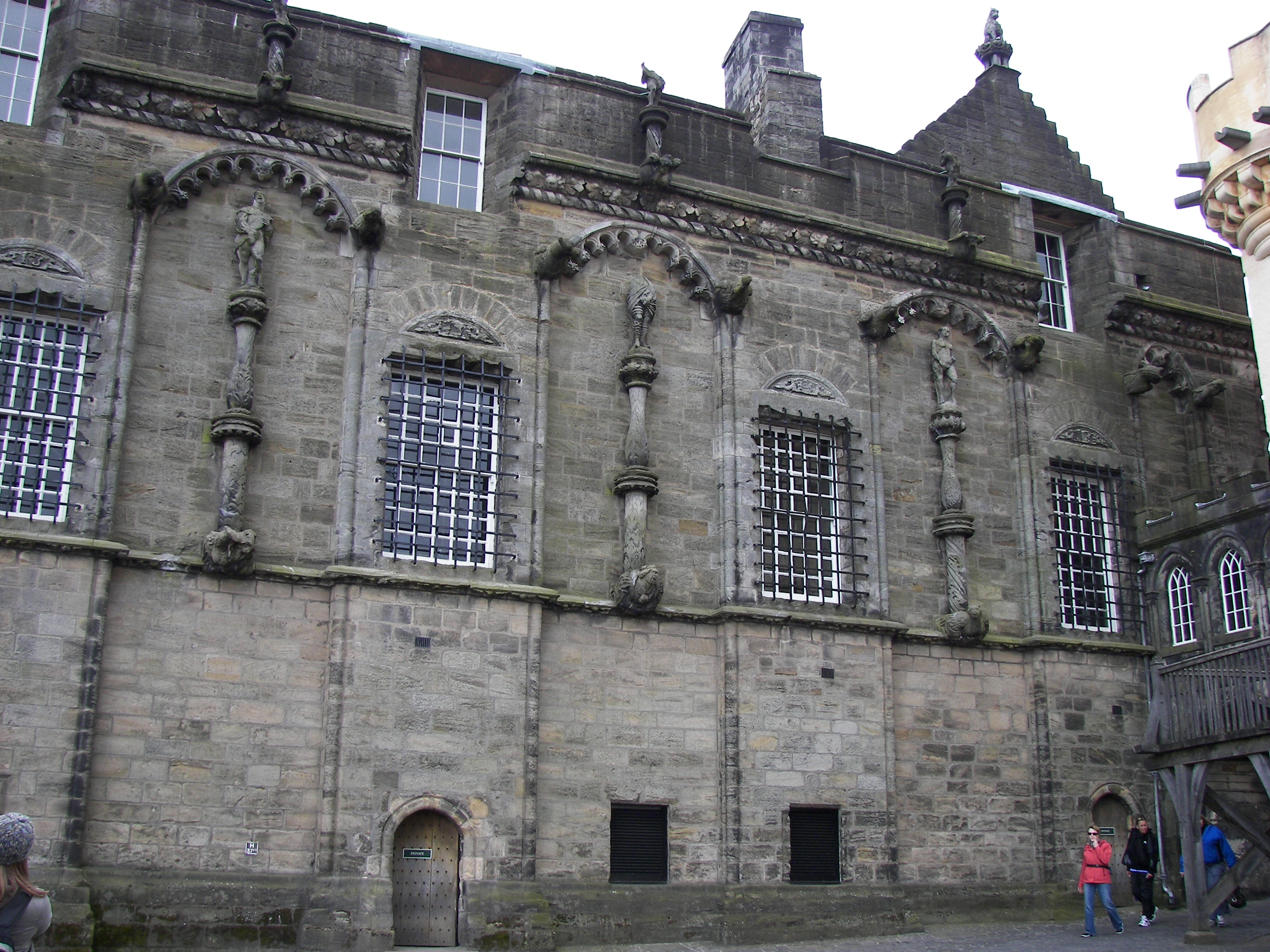
East façade of the Royal Palace with Renaissance-period statues

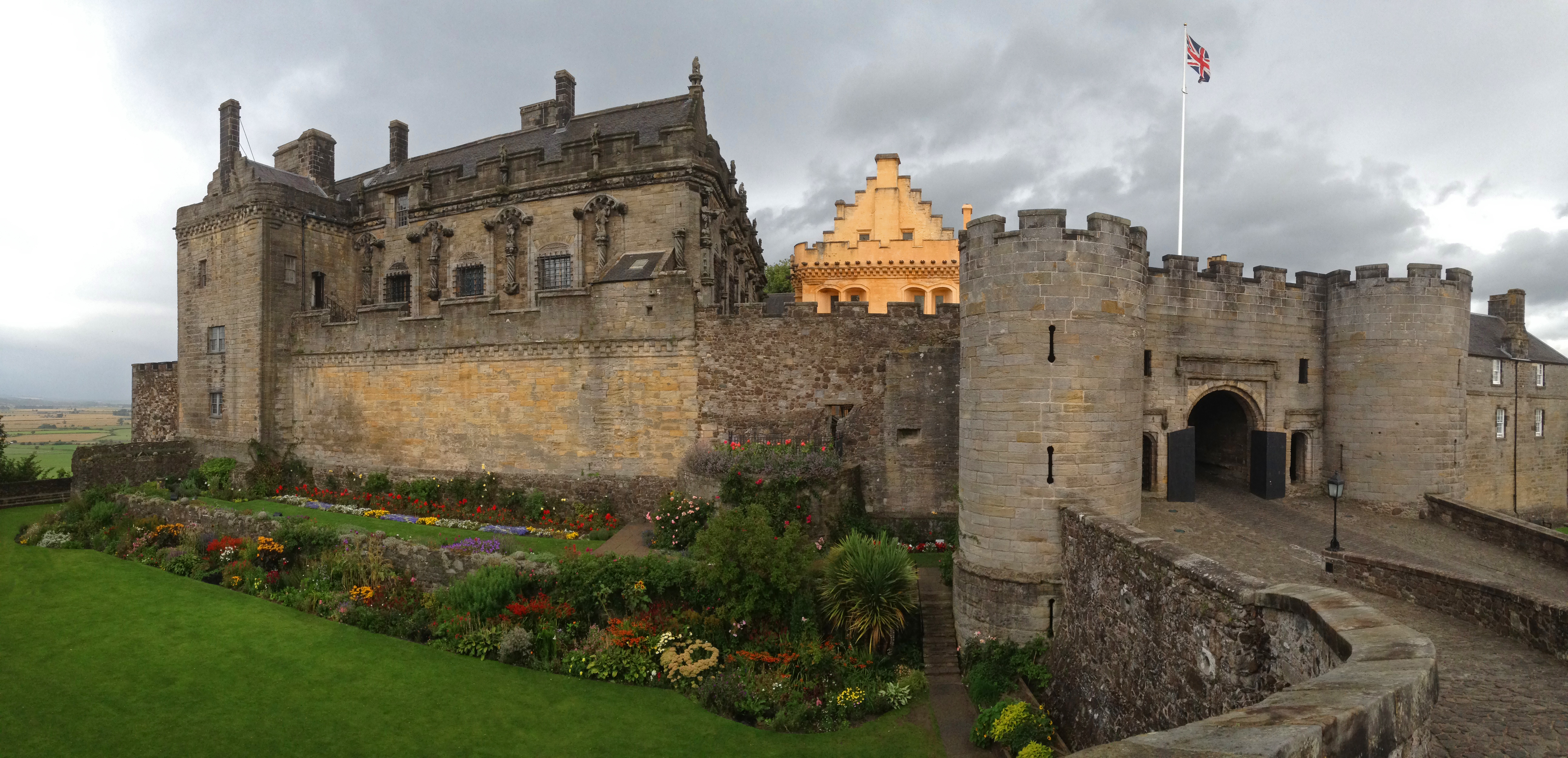
The Royal Palace and the Queen Anne walled garden

To the left of the gatehouse, and forming the south side of the Inner Close, is the Royal Palace. The first Renaissance palace in the British Isles, this was the work of King James V. With its combination of Renaissance architecture, and exuberant late-gothic detail, it is one of the most architecturally impressive buildings in Scotland, covered with unique carved stonework. It was begun in the 1530s, and was largely complete by the late 1540s.

The Master of Works, until his execution in 1540, was Sir James Hamilton of Finnart, who also financed part of the work, in return for land and favours from the king. Further work was carried out during the regency of Mary of Guise, and the upper floor was converted to provide an apartment for the castle governor in the 18th century.

The architecture is French-inspired, but the decoration is German in inspiration, and sources for the statues have been found in the work of the German engraver Hans Burgkmair. The statues include a line of soldiers on the south parapet, and a series of full-size figures around the principal floor. These principal figures include a portrait of James V, the Devil, St Michael, and representations of Venus and several planetary deities. Their arrangement on the north, east and south faces of the Palace has been interpreted in relation to the quarters of the heavens.

The 19th-century architectural historian R. W. Billings described the statues as "the fruits of an imagination luxuriant but revolting". The west façade is undecorated and incomplete, and the Privy Council of Scotland noted in 1625 that the building was "schote over the craig".

Internally, the Palace comprises two apartments, one each for the king and queen. Each has a hall, presence chamber, and bedchamber, with various small rooms known as closets. The Renaissance decoration continued inside, although little has survived the building's military use, excepting the carved stone fireplaces. The ceiling of the King's Presence Chamber was originally decorated with a series of carved oak portrait roundels known as the Stirling Heads, described as "among the finest examples of Scottish Renaissance wood-carving now extant". Some of the heads may have been made by a French-born carver Andrew Mansioun. The carvings were taken down following a ceiling collapse in 1777, and of an estimated 56 original heads, 38 survive. Most were given to the Smith Institute in Stirling but now these are preserved in the castle, and three more are in the National Museum of Scotland, Edinburgh.

Some of the portraits are believed to be of kings, queens or courtiers, and others are thought to show classical or Biblical figures. As with the exterior carving, similarities to German sources have been noted, and in particular to a ceiling in Wawel, Poland. A £12 million project to recreate the grandeur of the Royal Palace reopened to the public during the weekend of 5 and 6 June 2011. The restoration of the palace and its interiors involved a decade of research and craftsmanship, and restored six royal apartments to how they would have looked in the 1540s, when this was the childhood home of Mary Queen of Scots, The project involved the recreation of seven hand-woven tapestries.

==== Stirling heads ====
Stirling heads

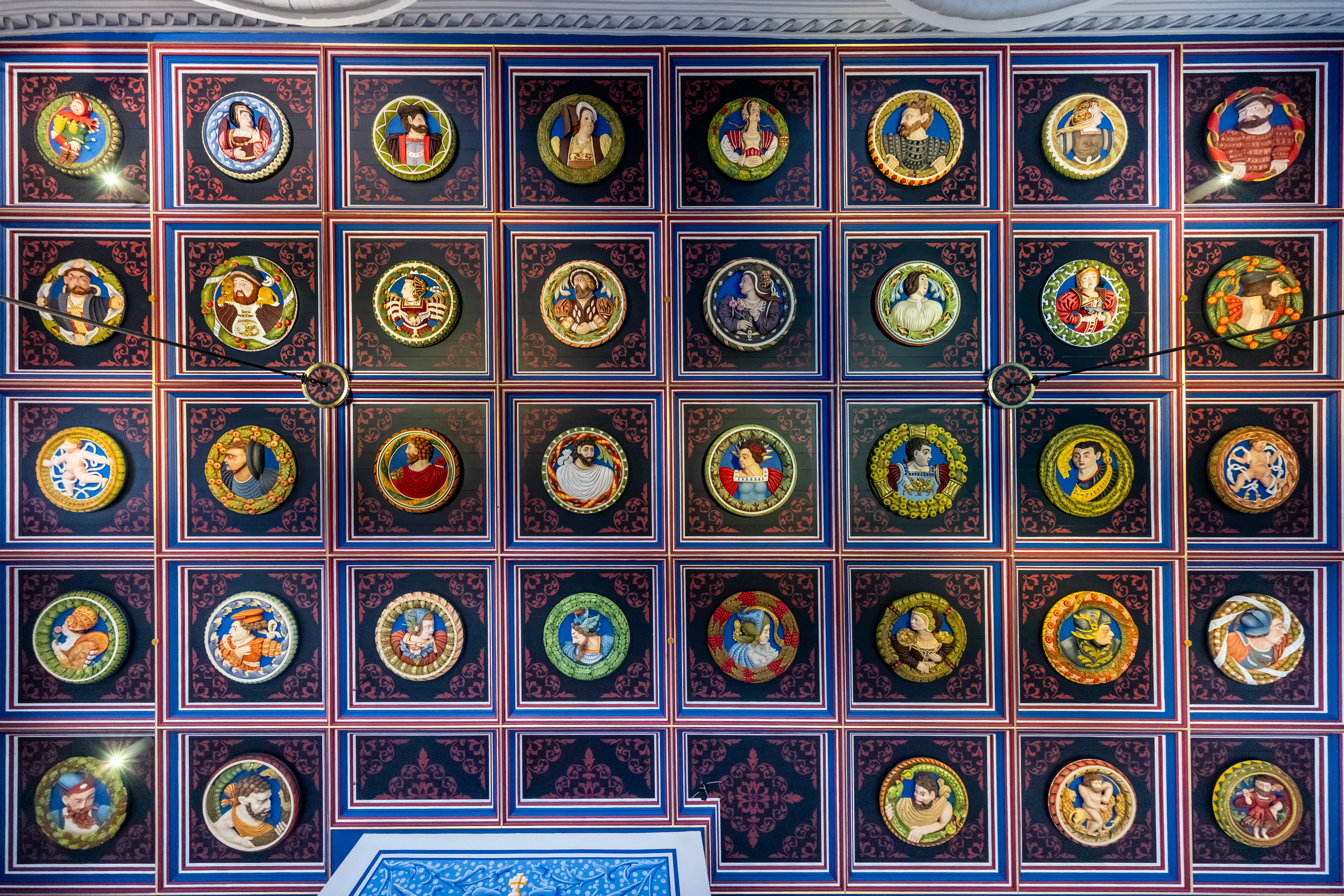
All 37 heads of the restored ceiling of the King's Chamber

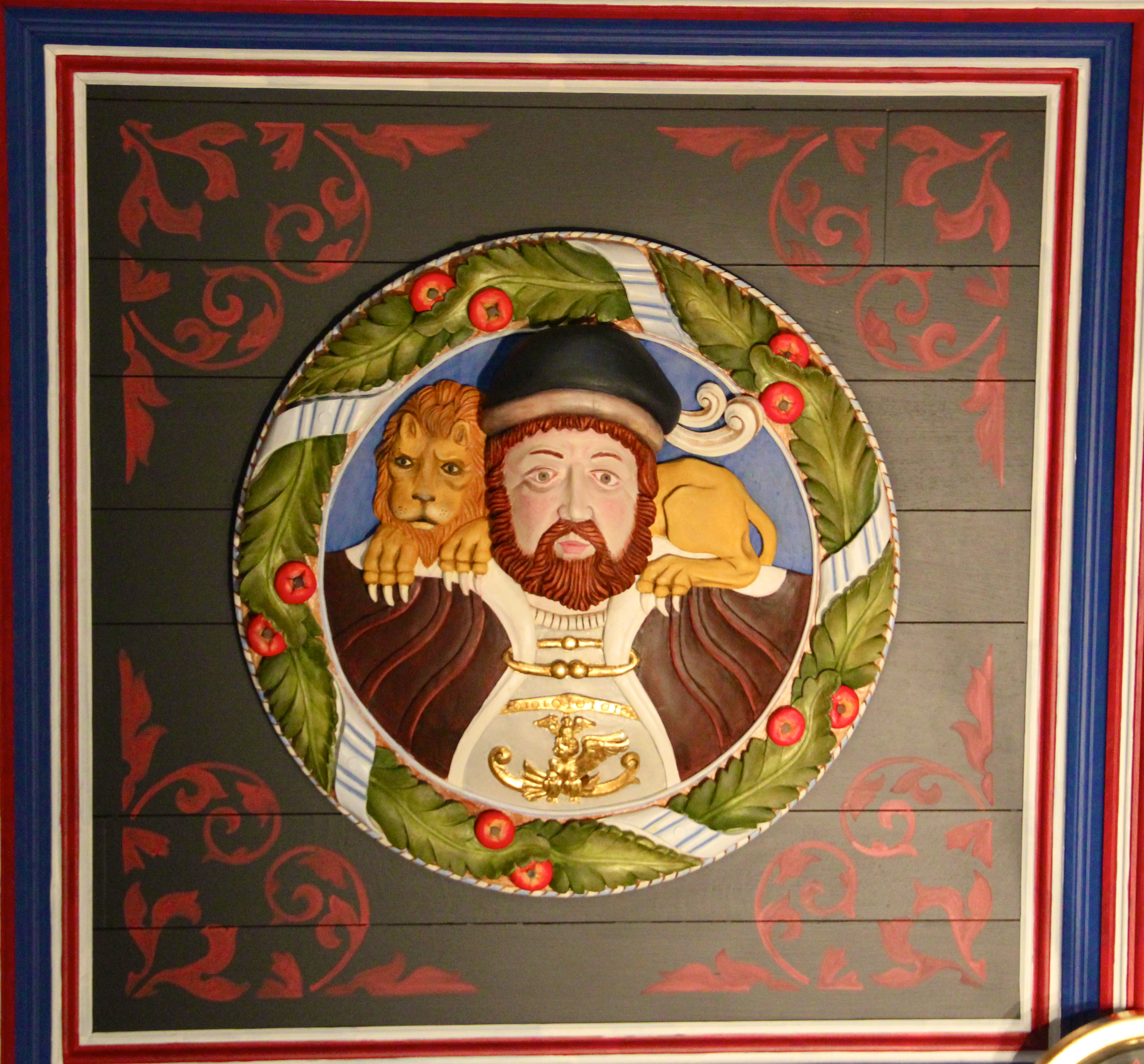
Henry VIII

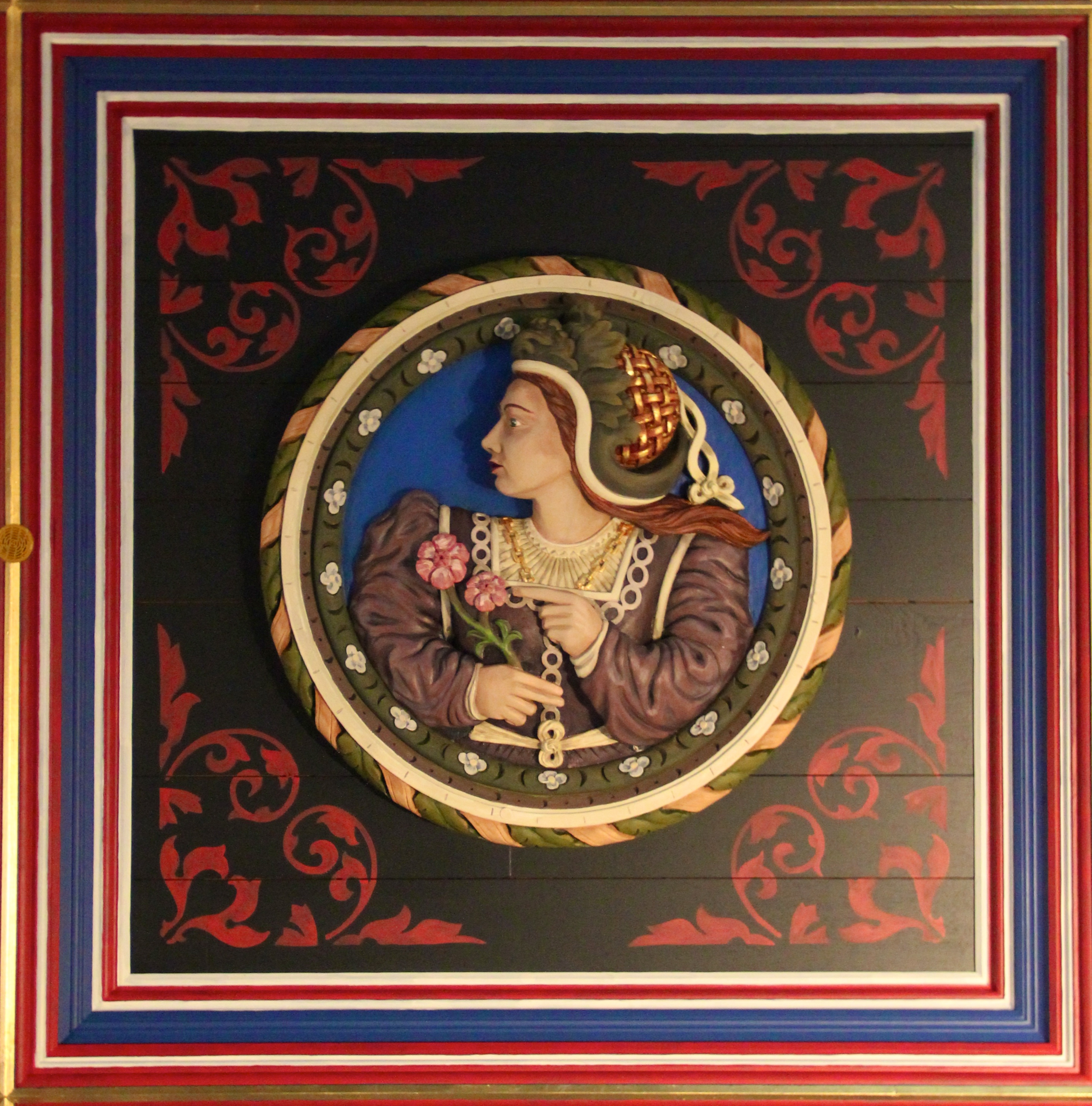
Mary of Guise

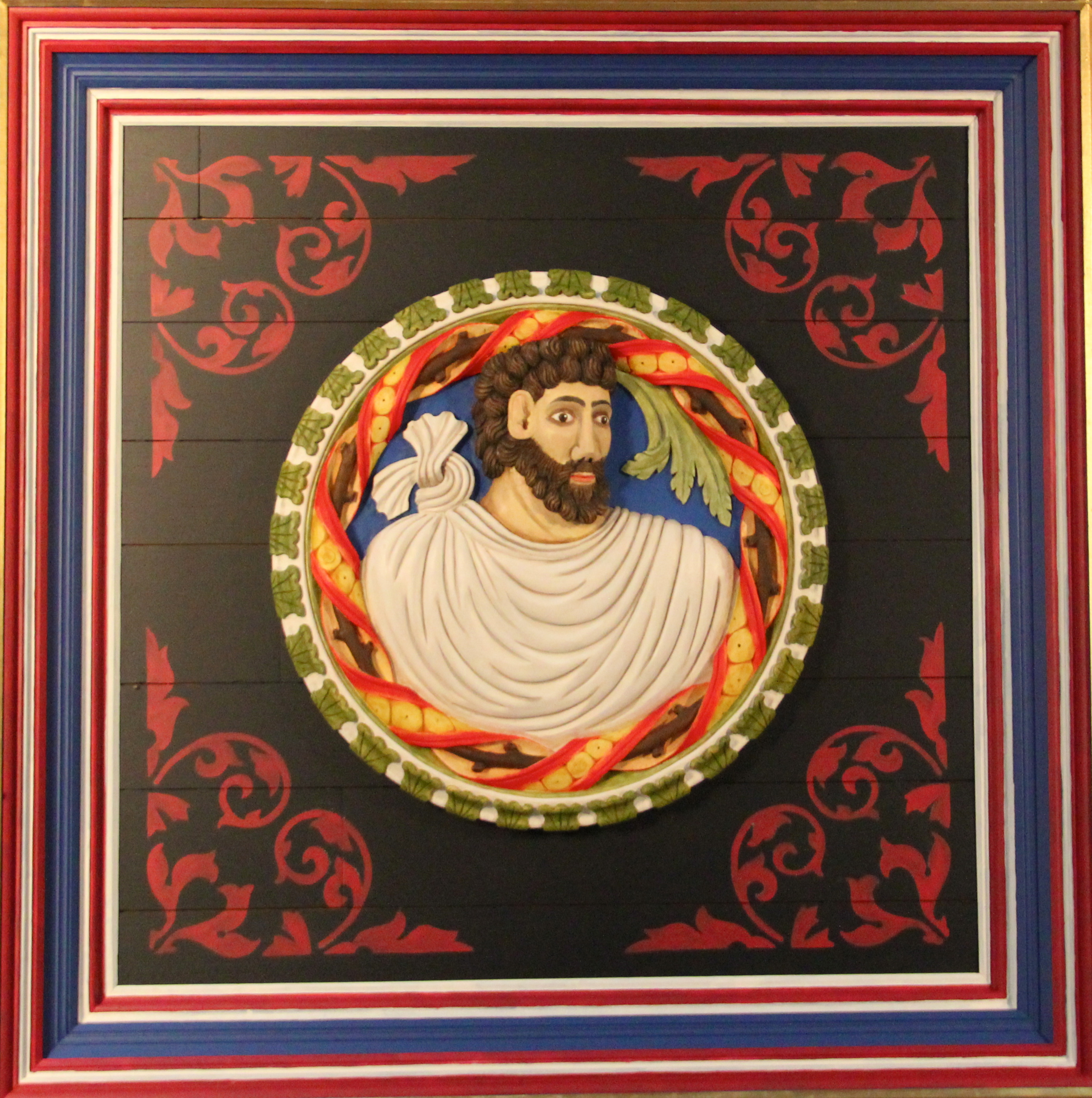
A Roman Emperor

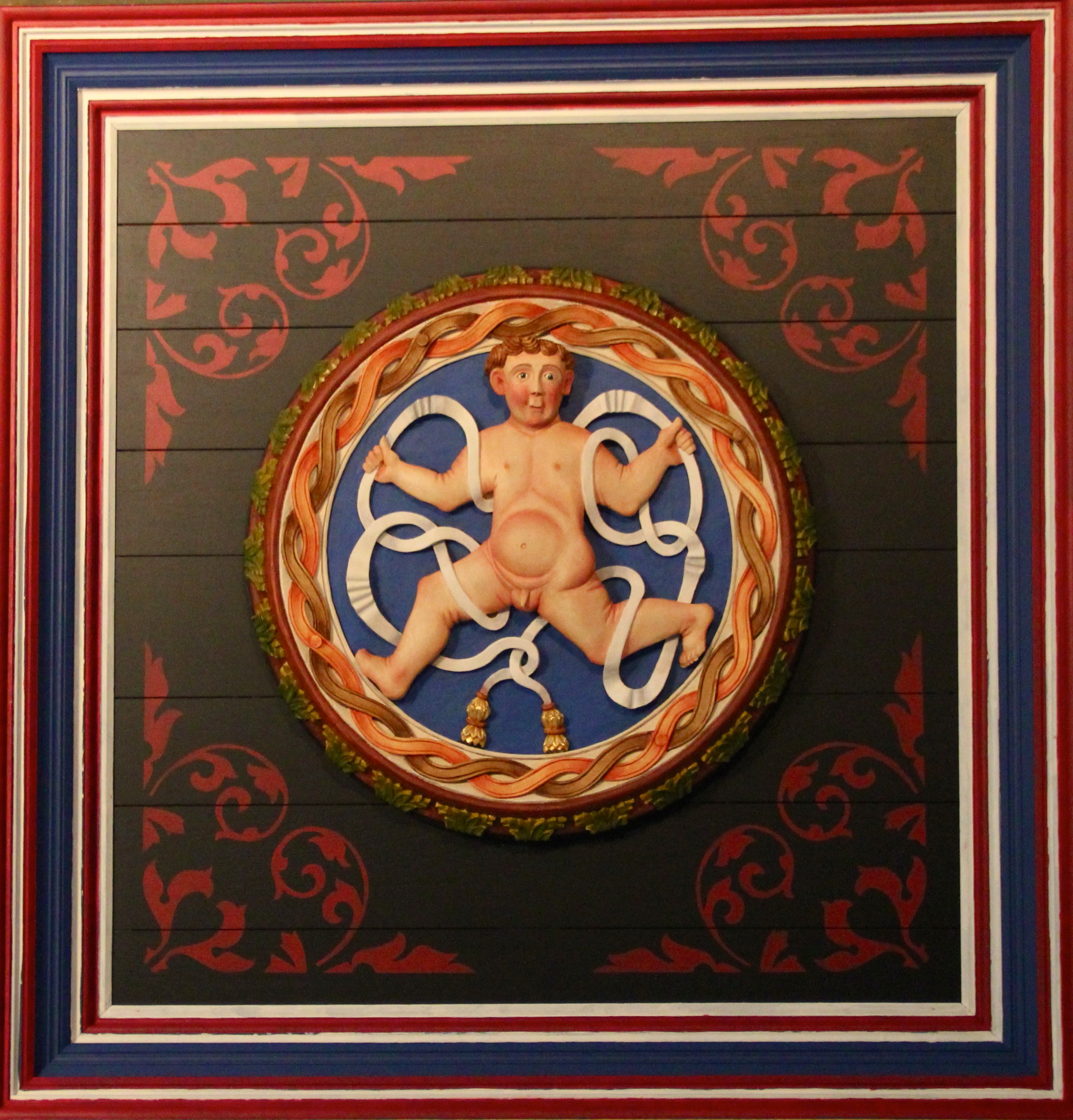
Putto

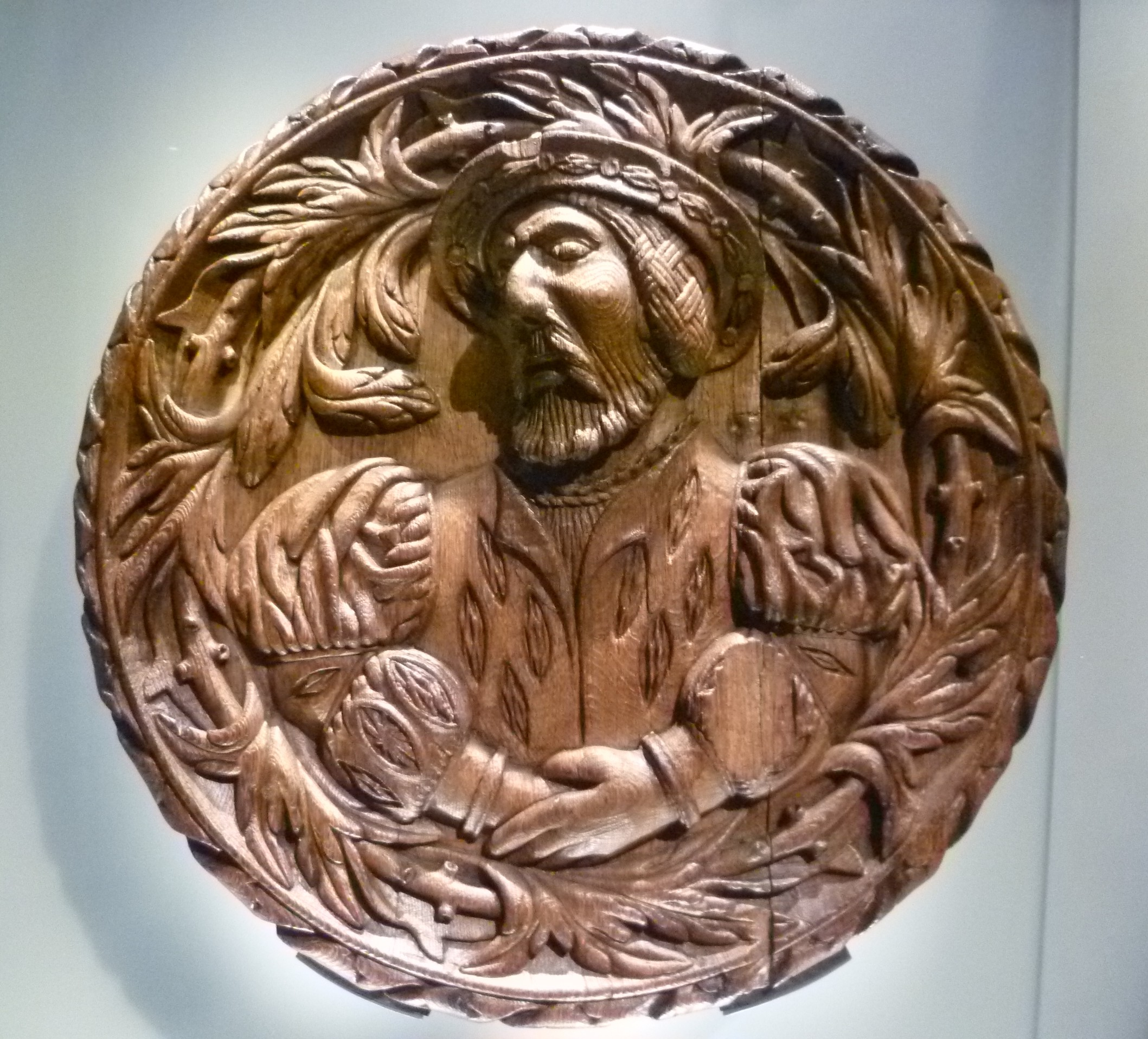
An original Stirling Head, James V

=== Chapel Royal ===
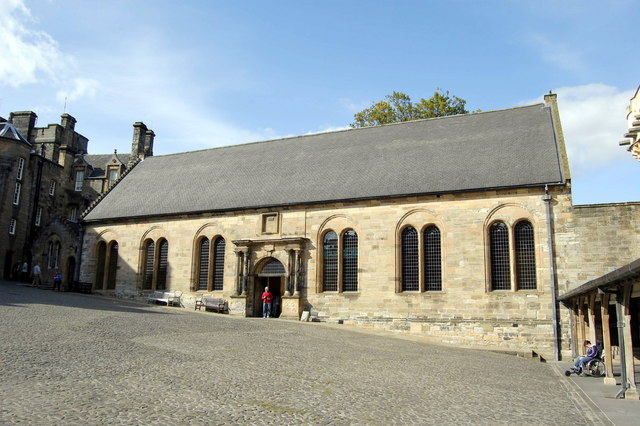
The Chapel Royal

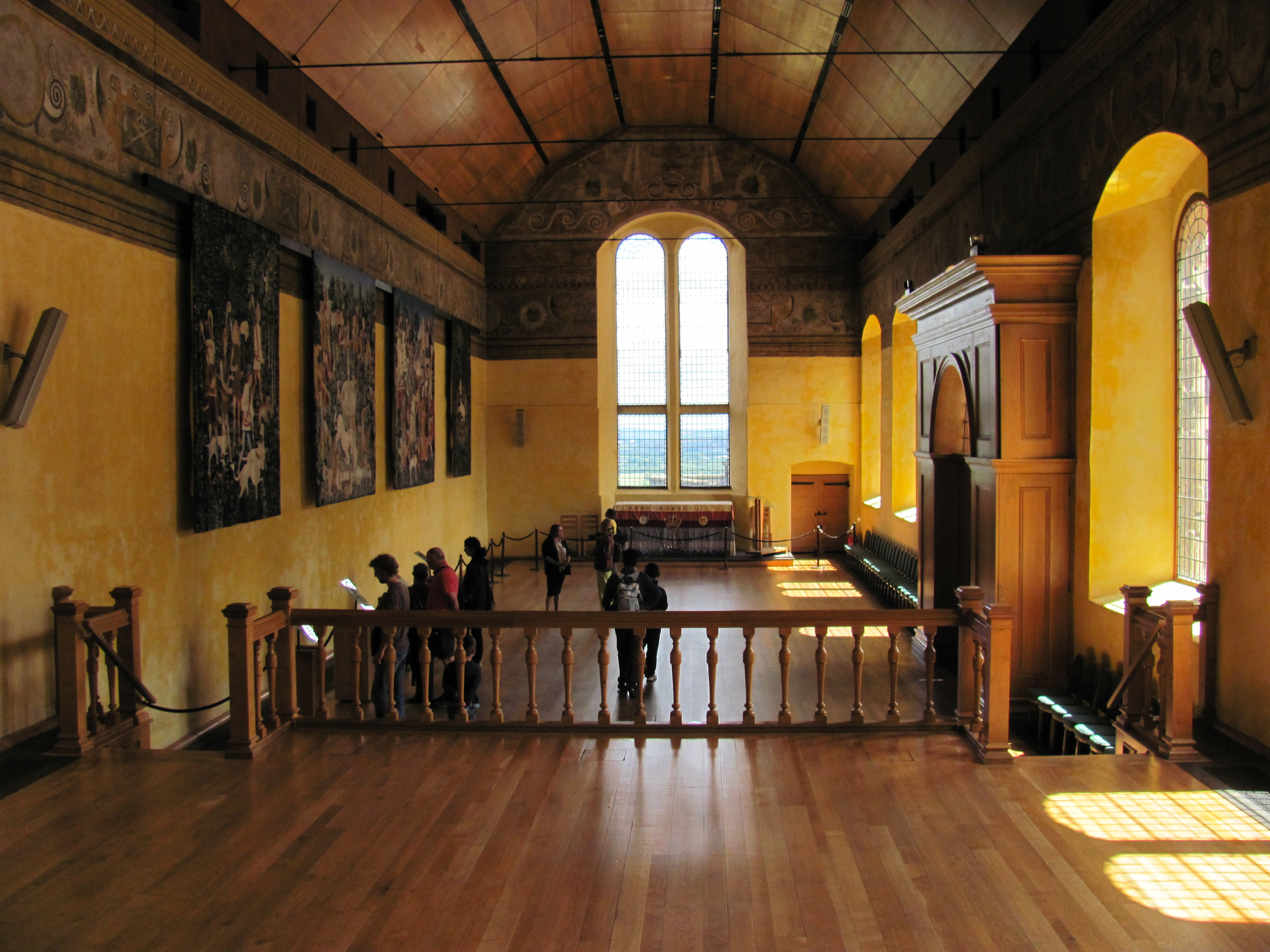
The interior of Chapel Royal

The collegiate chapel established by James IV in 1501 lay between the King's Old Building and the Great Hall, but was further south than the present building. This was the chapel in which Queen Mary was crowned in 1543. However, when James VI's first son, Prince Henry was born in 1594, it was decided to rebuild the chapel as a suitable venue for the royal baptism.

The new building was erected within a year, north of the old site to improve access to the hall. There was some doubt if the chapel, which John Colville called the "great temple of Solomon", could be finished in time. The chapel, with its Italianate arched windows, was the work of the Royal Master of Works William Schaw. The interior was decorated by the painter Valentine Jenkin prior to the visit of Charles I in 1633. The chapel too was later modified for military use, housing a dining room. The wall paintings were rediscovered in the 1930s, and restoration began after the Second World War.

=== Nether Bailey ===
Beyond the North Gate, the Nether Bailey occupies the northern end of Castle Hill. Surrounded by defensive walls, the area contains a 19th-century guard house and gunpowder stores, and the modern tapestry studio. There was formerly access to the Nether Bailey from Ballengeich to the west, until the postern was blocked in response to the threat of Jacobite rebellion.

=== Gardens ===
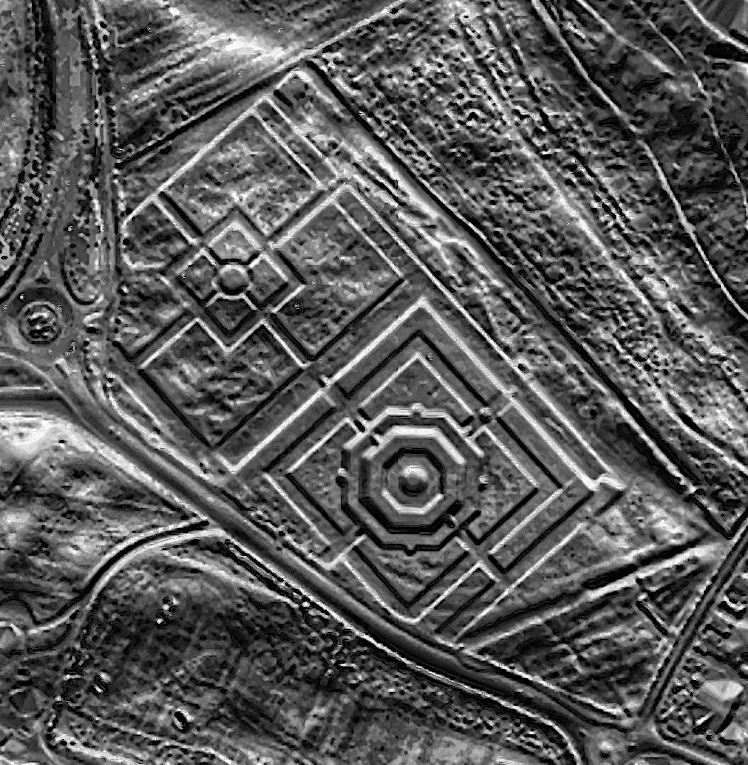
A lidar view of the King's and Queen's Knots

There are two gardens within the castle, the southern one including a bowling green. Below the castle's west wall is the King's Knot, a 16th-century formal garden, now only visible as earthworks, but once including hedges and knot-patterned parterres. The surviving octagonal earthwork mount was the work of the gardener William Watts and architect James Murray in 1629. The gardens were built on the site of a medieval jousting arena known as the Round Table, in imitation of the legendary court of King Arthur.

The castle park held deer and white cattle. Mary, Queen of Scots, organised the hunt of a white bull as part of the entertainments at the baptism of James VI in 1566. In 1595, an excequer official John Skene noted that the park still held "deir and quhyt ky" and could include meadows for haymaking.

== Modern use ==
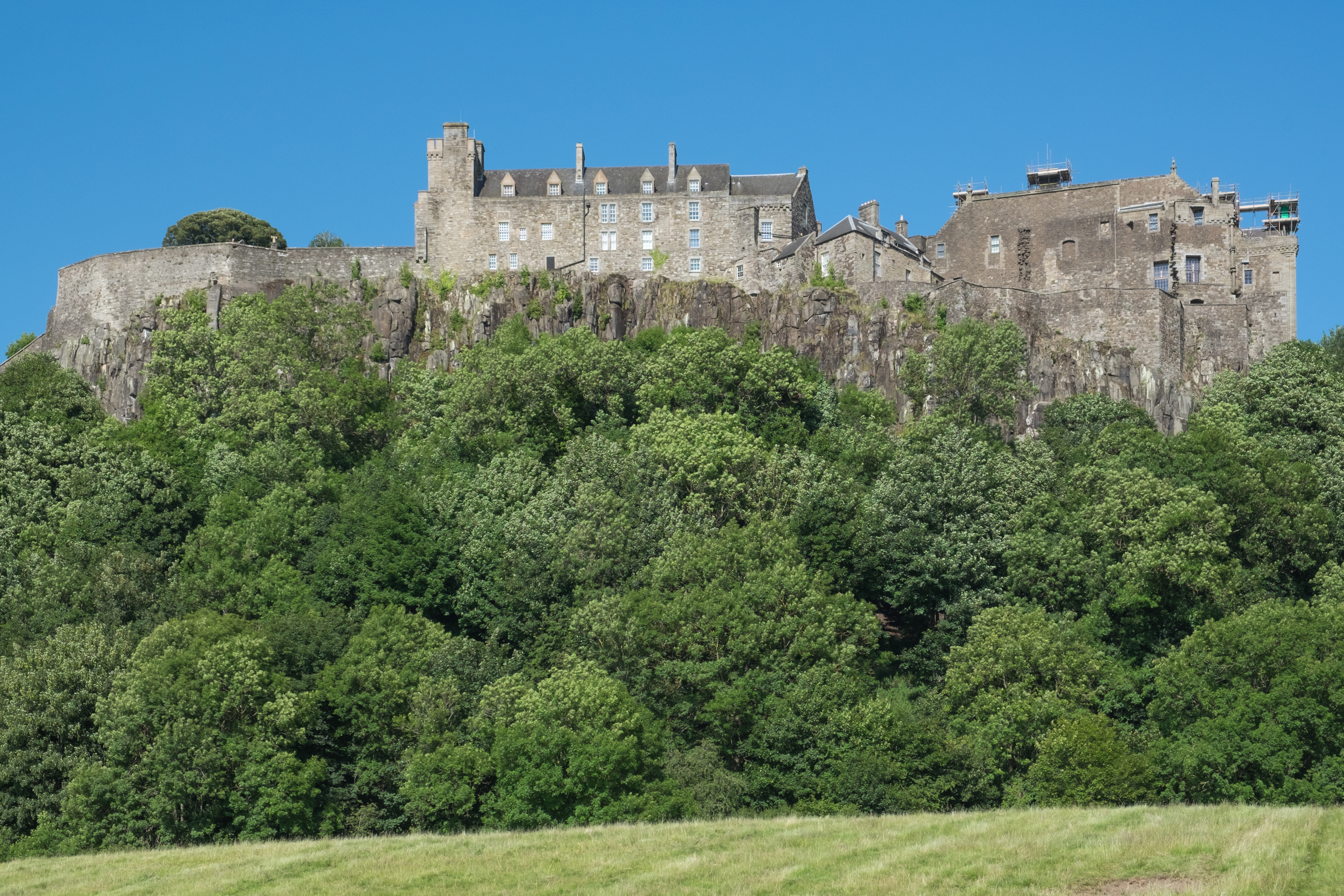
Stirling Castle in 2017

The castle esplanade, or parade ground, has been used as an open-air concert venue for several noted acts, some of whom have used Stirling Castle and the surrounding scenery to film "in concert" DVDs. These acts include R.E.M., Ocean Colour Scene, Bob Dylan, Wet Wet Wet, Rod Stewart and Runrig. The esplanade also hosts the city's Hogmanay celebrations. The Regimental Museum and Home Headquarters of the Argyll and Sutherland Highlanders are located in the King's Old Building. The museum closed for refurbishment on 31 August 2018 and reopened in June 2021.

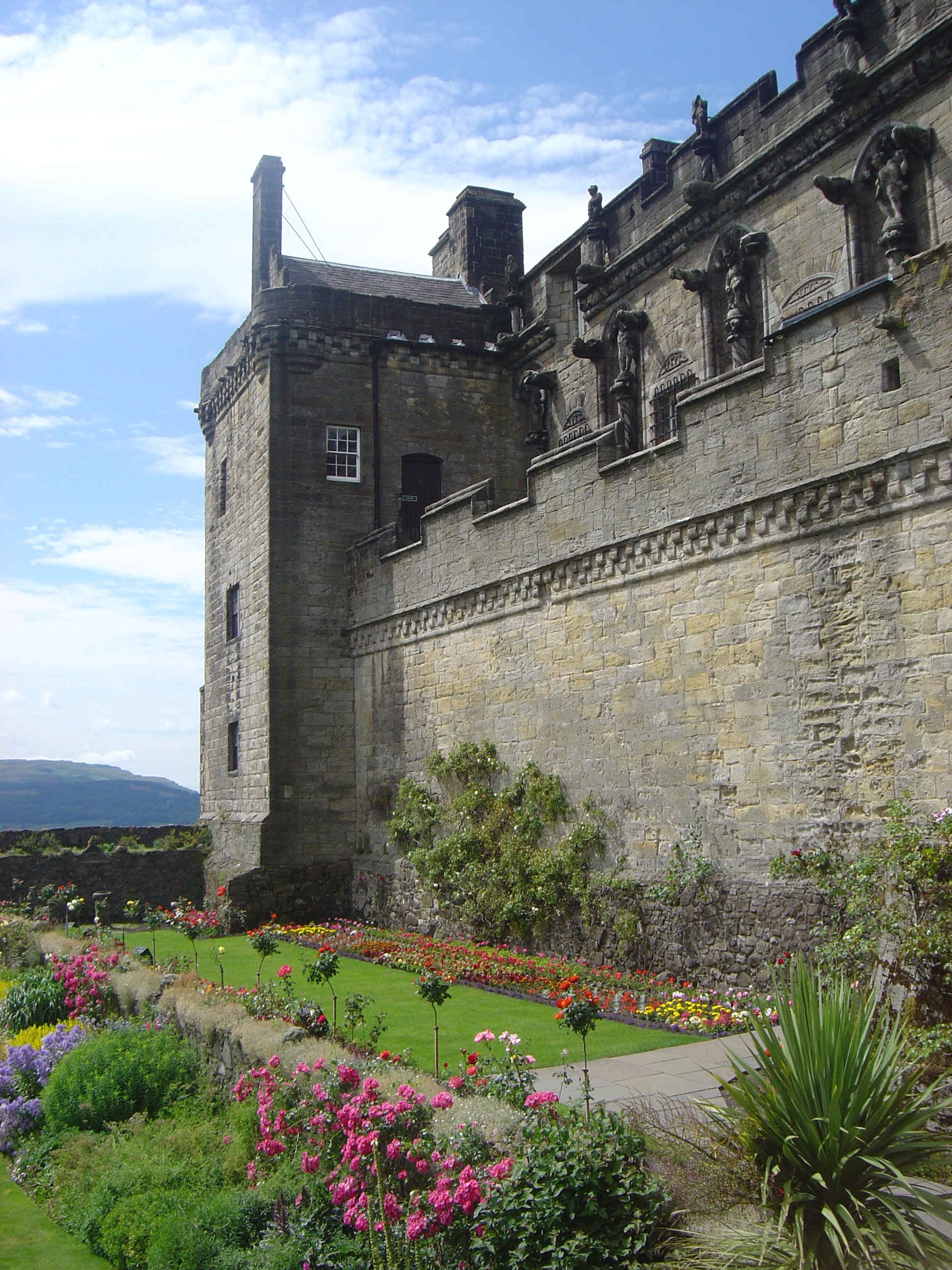
Castle gardens in front of the Prince's Tower

The castle is open to the public year-round. Stirling Castle is a popular place for tourists, and according to figures released by the Association of Leading Visitor Attractions, 609,698 people visited in 2019.

An illustration of Stirling Castle features on the reverse side of a current series of £20 notes issued by the Clydesdale Bank, with Robert the Bruce on horseback in the foreground.

Due to its similar appearance to Colditz Castle in Saxony, Germany, the castle was used to film the exterior shots for the 1970s TV series Colditz, a drama about the many attempts of Allied POWs to escape from the castle during its use as a military prison in the Second World War.

== Ghostlore ==
Numerous accounts of ghostlore exist in relation to Stirling Castle, with the Green Lady being perhaps the most renowned. According to various reports, she has been sighted by a multitude of residents and visitors over the years. One widely circulated narrative posits that the Green Lady was a maidservant who rescued Queen Mary from a perilous situation. Many interpret the apparition of the Green Lady as a portent of impending danger, often in the form of a fire.

== See also ==
- Governor of Stirling Castle
- Banknotes of Scotland (featured on design)
- Castles in Great Britain and Ireland
- List of castles in Scotland

== Bibliography ==
- Anonymous (1817). Lacunar Strevelinense, A Collection of Heads in Stirling Castle. William Blackwood.
- Billings, Robert Williams (1852). Baronial and Ecclesiastical Antiquities of Scotland. Vol. 4. Oliver & Boyd.
- Cruden, Stewart (1981). The Scottish Castle. Spurbooks. ISBN 0-7157-2088-0.
- Dunbar, John (1975). The Stirling Heads. RCAHMS/HMSO. ISBN 0-11-491310-2.
- Dunbar, John (1999). Scottish Royal Palaces. Tuckwell Press. ISBN 1-86232-042-X.
- Fawcett, Richard (1995). Stirling Castle. B.T. Batsford/Historic Scotland. ISBN 0-7134-7623-0.
- Fraser, Antonia (1994) [1969]. Mary Queen of Scots. London: Weidenfeld and Nicolson. ISBN 978-0-297-17773-9.
- Gifford, John; Walker, Frank Arneil (2002). Central Scotland. Buildings of Scotland. Yale. ISBN 0-300-09594-5.
- Glendinning, Miles; MacKechnie, Aonghus (2004). Scottish Architecture. Thames & Hudson. ISBN 0-500-20374-1.
- Harrison, John G. (2007). "The Royal Court and the Community of Stirling" (PDF). The Forth Naturalist and Historian. 30: 29–50. Archived from the original (PDF) on 24 September 2015.
- Harrison, John G. (2011). Rebirth of a Palace: The Royal Court at Stirling Castle. Historic Scotland. ISBN 978-1-84917-055-0.
- Higgins, James (2020). Scotland's Stewart Monarchs.
- King, Elspeth (2007). "The Stirling Heads and The Stirling Smith" (PDF). The Forth Naturalist and Historian. 30: 51–60. Archived from the original (PDF) on 24 September 2015.
- McKean, Charles (2004). The Scottish Chateau (2nd ed.). Sutton Publishing. ISBN 0-7509-3527-8.
- Pearce, Michael (2018). "A French Furniture Maker and the 'Courtly Style' in Sixteenth-Century Scotland". Regional Furniture. 32: 129–130.
- Shire, Helena M (1996). "The King in his House". In Williams, Janet Hadley (ed.). Stewart Style 1513–1542. Tuckwell Press. pp. 62–96. ISBN 1-898410-82-8.
- Stair-Kerr, Eric (1928). Stirling Castle, its place in Scots history (2nd ed.). Eneas Mackay.
- Tabraham, Chris (1997). Scotland's Castles. BT Batsford/Historic Scotland. ISBN 0-7134-7965-5.
