= Wallace Sword =

Sword supposedly owned by William Wallace

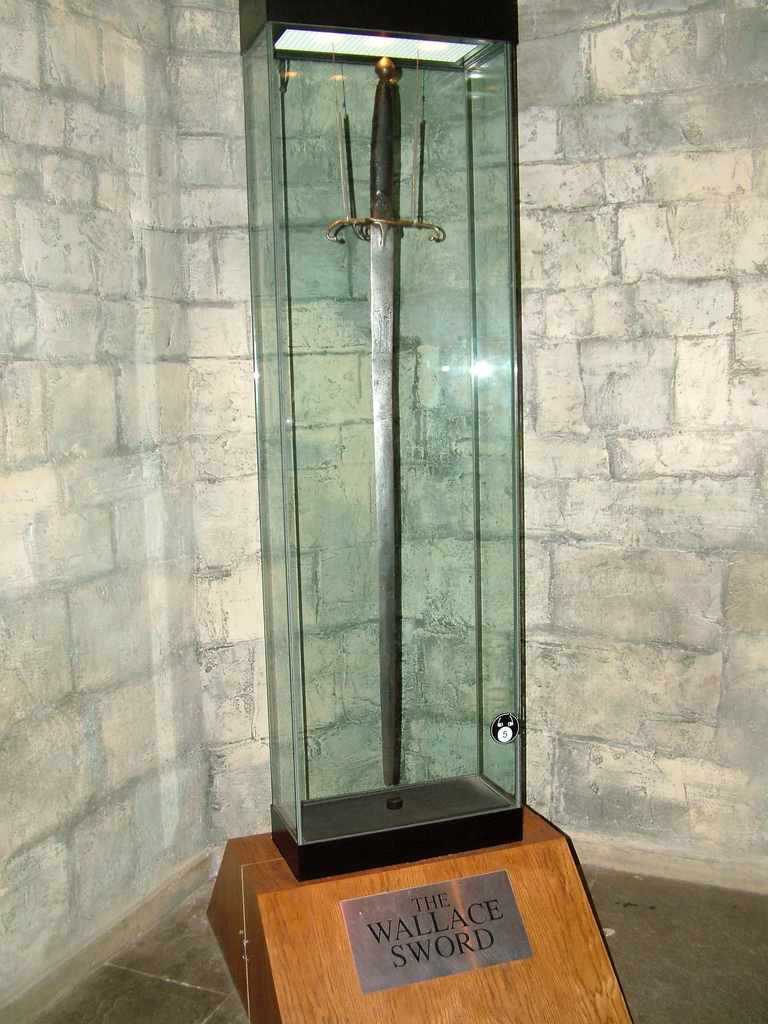
- The Wallace Sword.
- Type: two-handed sword
- Place of origin: Scotland

Service history
- In service: 13th-century
- Used by: William Wallace
- Wars: First War of Scottish Independence; Battle of Stirling Bridge; Battle of Falkirk; Battle of Happrew

Specifications
- Mass: 5.1875 pounds (2.353 kg)
- Length: 5 feet 4 inches (163 cm)

The Wallace Sword is an antique two-handed sword purported to have belonged to William Wallace (1270–1305), a Scottish knight who led a resistance to the English occupation of Scotland during the First War of Scottish Independence. It is said to have been used by William Wallace at the Battle of Stirling Bridge in 1297 and the Battle of Falkirk (1298).

The sword is 5 feet 4 inches (163 cm). long, of which the blade is 4 feet 4 inches (132 cm). The blade tapers from 2.25 inches (5.7 cm) wide at the guard to 0.75 inches (1.9 cm) before the point. The sword weighs 5 pounds 3 ounces (2.35 kg).

The sword is currently on display in the National Wallace Monument in Stirling, Scotland.

== History ==
It has been alleged that after William Wallace's execution in 1305, John de Menteith, governor of Dumbarton Castle, received the sword in August of that year, but there are no records to that effect. Two hundred years later, in 1505, accounts survive which state that at the command of King James IV of Scotland, the sum of 26 shillings was paid to an armourer for the "binding of Wallace's sword with cords of silk" and providing it with "a new hilt and plummet" and also with a "new scabbard and a new belt". This repair would have been necessary because, according to legend, Wallace's original scabbard, hilt, and belt were said to have been made from the dried skin of Hugh de Cressingham, who was killed at the Battle of Stirling Bridge.

No other written records of the sword are found for a further three centuries. In 1875, a letter from the War Office informed that the sword in 1825 was sent to the Tower of London to be repaired. At that time, it was submitted to Samuel Meyrick by the Duke of Wellington for examination.

Meyrick was an authority on ancient swords, but he estimated the age of the sword by examining the mountings only, which were replaced early in the 16th century. Thus he concluded that the sword could not date from earlier than the 15th century. However, he did not take account of the blade, which must have been of some importance for James IV to have it bound in silk and given a new scabbard, hilt, and belt, and it was also described then as the "Wallas sword".

The sword was recovered from Dumbarton by Charles Rogers, author of The Book of Wallace. Rogers, on 15 October 1888, who renewed a correspondence with the Secretary of State for War, with the result that the major general commanding forces in North Britain was authorised to deliver the weapon to his care for preservation in the Wallace Monument.

In 2005, the sword was lent to New York City for display at Grand Central Terminal during Tartan Week celebrations; it was the first time the artefact left Scotland in modern times.

On 2 March 2023, the case of the sword was vandalised by a climate group This Is Rigged. Work is underway to analyse if the sword was also damaged.

== Historical accuracy ==
There is good reason to believe that this sword as it is now did not belong to William Wallace. The blade does not possess a fuller — a near-universal feature of blades with this type of cross-section (lenticular) except in processional swords of the Renaissance. The blade in its original state would have likely been Oakeshott type XIIIa (also known as espée de guerre or great war sword), which became common by the mid-13th century. Such swords would have a long, wide blade with parallel edges, ending in a rounded or spatulate tip. The grip, longer than in the earlier Scottish swords, typically some 15 cm (5.9 in)), allows good two-handed use. The cross-guards were probably down-sloping (in the later highland style) or straight, and the pommel either regularly Brazil-nut or disk-shaped but this case perhaps a lobed pommel inspired by the Viking style.

Close inspection reveals that it may be made up from pieces of different swords fitted together. Part of this could have come from a late-13th-century sword. David Caldwell, writes that "Apart from the reshaping of the guard, this sword does not appear untypical of the two-handed swords in use in the lowlands of Scotland in the late sixteenth or early seventeenth centuries." (page 174) and that the blade has a ricasso, which is not a medieval feature. However, the blade appears to be made of 3 separate pieces hammer welded together. The bottommost piece has a flattened diamond cross-section, and so perhaps might be a 13th-century sword, and therefore there is some hope for those who think that Wallace's sword is there. The sword may be an example of a Ship of Theseus.
