= William Burns (Scottish historian) =

Scottish lawyer, historian and nationalist (1809–1876)

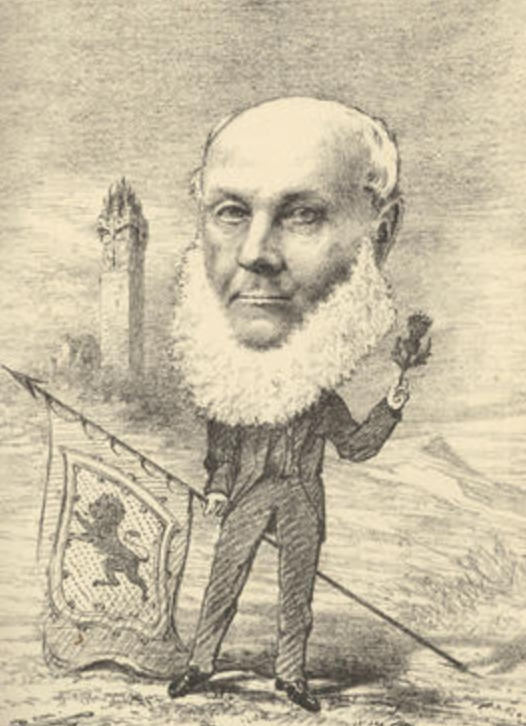
William Burns with Wallace Monument behind

William Burns (1809–1876) was a Scottish lawyer, early Chartist, historian and nationalist who was one of the prime movers in the campaign to create the Wallace Monument.

== Life ==
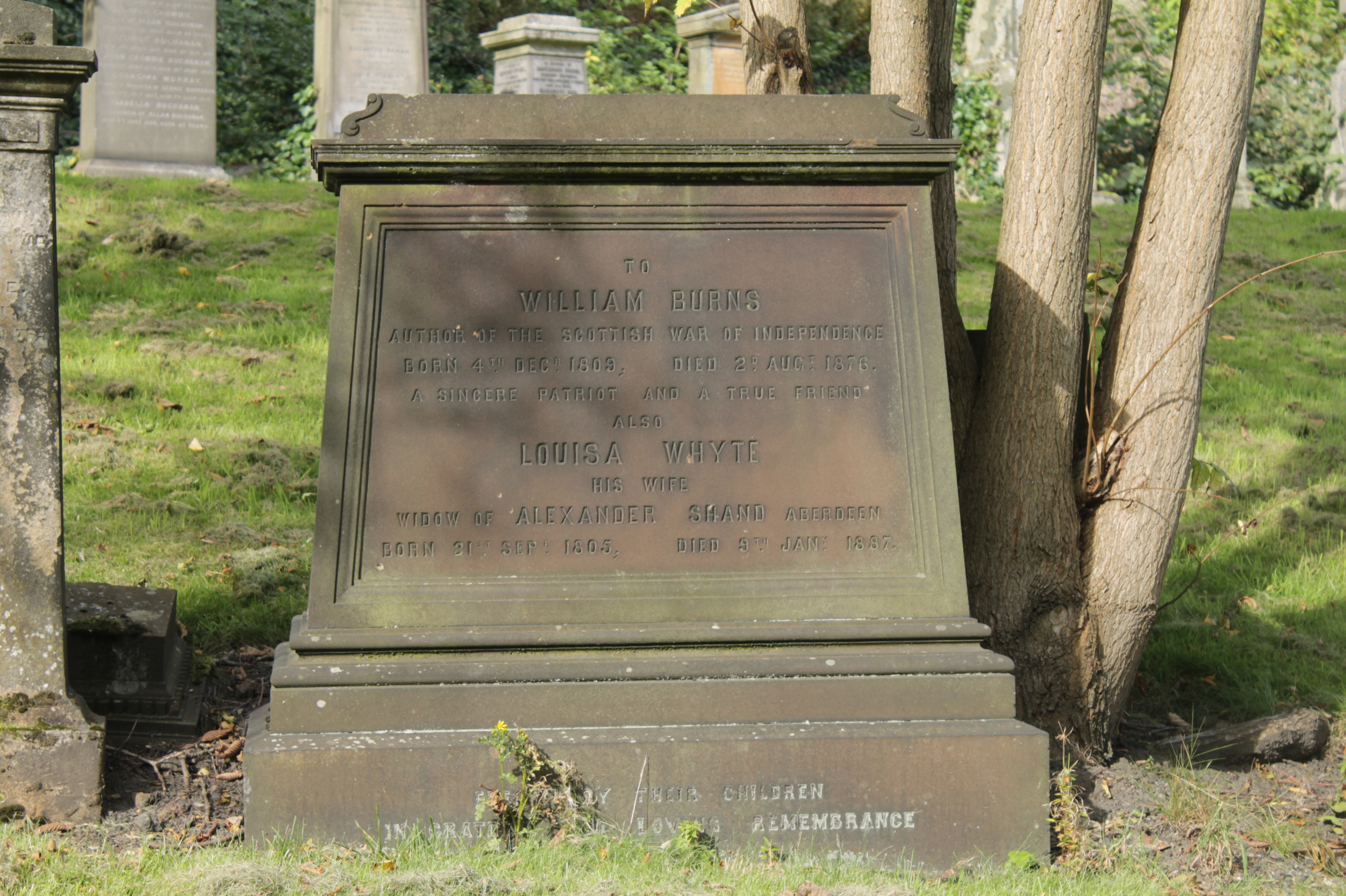
The grave of William Burns, Glasgow Necropolis

He was born in Saltcoats on 4 December 1809, the son of a chemical manufacturer. He served an apprenticeship as a lawyer in Saltcoats and moved to Glasgow in the early 1840s. In 1845 he was practising at 29 St Vincent Place in the city centre, living at 296 Greenhill Place.

In 1851 Rev Charles Rogers began a campaign to create a national monument to William Wallace. Burns became involved deeply in this campaign and took over as Secretary on Roger's resignation. Together with Rogers they commissioned John Thomas Rochead to design the monument.

In 1861 he was present at the laying of the foundation stone of the Wallace Monument. He was also present at the official opening in 1869.

In later life he lived at Belmont House in the Dowanhill district of Glasgow.

He died in Glasgow on 2 August 1876. His grave lies midway up the south-west slopes of the Glasgow Necropolis.

Following Burns's death the finances of the payment for the Wallace Monument fell into disarray. Although the monument was completed many parties (including the architect) remained unpaid.

== Family ==
He was married to Louisa Whyte, the widow of Alexander Shand of Aberdeen.

== Publications ==
- Scotland Insulted! (1856)
- Banking in Glasgow during the Olden Times (1862)
- Scottish History, Memories and Associations (1863)
- The Scottish Wars of Independence (1874)

== Artistic recognition ==
A marble bust of Burns is in the Wallace Monument.
