= William de Ormesby =

English judge

- Arms of William de Ormesby; Gules, crusilly argent, a bend chequy or and azure.

Personal details
- Died: 1317

William de Ormesby (died 1317) was a 13th-14th century English judge. He was the Justice of Scotland between 1296 and 1297 after the invasion of Scotland by England in 1296.

== Life ==
His family originated from the village of Ormesby, in East Norfolk. On 10 April 1292 he was appointed, with Hugh de Cressingham and others as justice in eyre in the counties of Lancashire, Westmoreland, and Cumberland, with special injunctions to hear and determine complaints against the king's bailiffs and ministers. His commission was extended on 28 August to include Northumberland. In 1296 he became a justice in the court of king's bench. Ormesby met King Edward I of England at Berwick on the king's return from his triumphant progress through Scotland. At that meeting Ormesby was appointed Justice of Scotland. Edward I requested that Ormesby exact homage and fealty from the Scottish tenants in chief, which Ormesby carried out with unflinching severity and with no politic respect to persons, driving into exile all those who refused the oaths to Edward I.

With the absence of John de Warenne, Earl of Surrey and Hugh de Cressingham in England, Ormesby bore the chief weight of responsibility for Edward's harsh rule over the Scots. When William Wallace's revolt broke out in May 1297, Ormesby was attacked by Wallace at Scone. Ormesby who had been given warning at the last moment, succeeded in escaping, having to leave all his personal property. After the English defeat at the battle of Stirling Bridge on 11 September, Ormesby was appointed on 23 October to raise foot soldiers in Northumberland, Yorkshire, Derbyshire, and Nottinghamshire for the further campaign against the Scots. In March 1298 he was summoned to a council in London and continued duties at the king's bench. In 1305 he was also chief of the justices of trailbaston assigned for the counties of Norfolk and Suffolk.

Ormesby continued to act as a judge under King Edward II of England, though it is not known whether he continued at the king's bench. William continued to be summoned with the judges to parliament until his death and served as justice of assize in the eastern counties, especially Norfolk and Suffolk. In April 1311, Ormesby was appointed with three others to act as justices of common pleas in the liberties of the bishopric of Durham. Ormesby died before 12 June 1317, which was the date his executors were ordered to send to the crown the rolls, writs, and other records in his possession as justice itinerant in the eastern counties. He was buried in the Benedictine monastery of St. Benet's, Hulme.

== Marriage and issue ==
William is known to have married Sybilla, the widow of Roger Loveday.
