= Raid on Scone =

13th-century military raid in Scotland

Coordinates: 56.4275°N 3.4016°W

- Part of First War of Scottish Independence
Date	June 1297
Location	Scone, Scotland
Result	Scottish victory

Belligerents
Kingdom of Scotland	Kingdom of England

Commanders and leaders
Sir William Wallace; Sir William Douglas	William de Ormesby

After the action at Lanark, William Wallace joined forces with William Douglas the Hardy and led a raid on the city of Scone. He and his men forced William de Ormesby, the English-appointed Justice of Scotland, to flee, and took control. After this, Douglas was captured, but Wallace continued to capture land for Scotland, and then moved on to win the Battle of Stirling Bridge.
