= Cressingham =

Cressingham may refer to:

Places

- Great Cressingham, Norfolk, England
- Little Cressingham, Norfolk, England

People

- Hugh de Cressingham, 13th century historical figure
