= Action at Earnside =

14th-century skirmish in Scotland

The action at Earnside was a skirmish which took place in the Wars of Scottish Independence in September 1304. Not much is known about it, but it is significant as the last action known to be fought by William Wallace.

Even its location is uncertain. Contemporary records describe it as taking place at "Yrenside". This is usually interpreted to mean "Earnside", i.e. somewhere on the banks of the River Earn. However it has been suggested that it should be interpreted as "Ironside", which could possibly mean Ironside Hill in the Sidlaw Hills.

There is mention in English records of compensation being paid for a horse lost in a flight from William Wallace below "Yrenside". There is also mention of the Constable of Dundee pursuing Wallace.

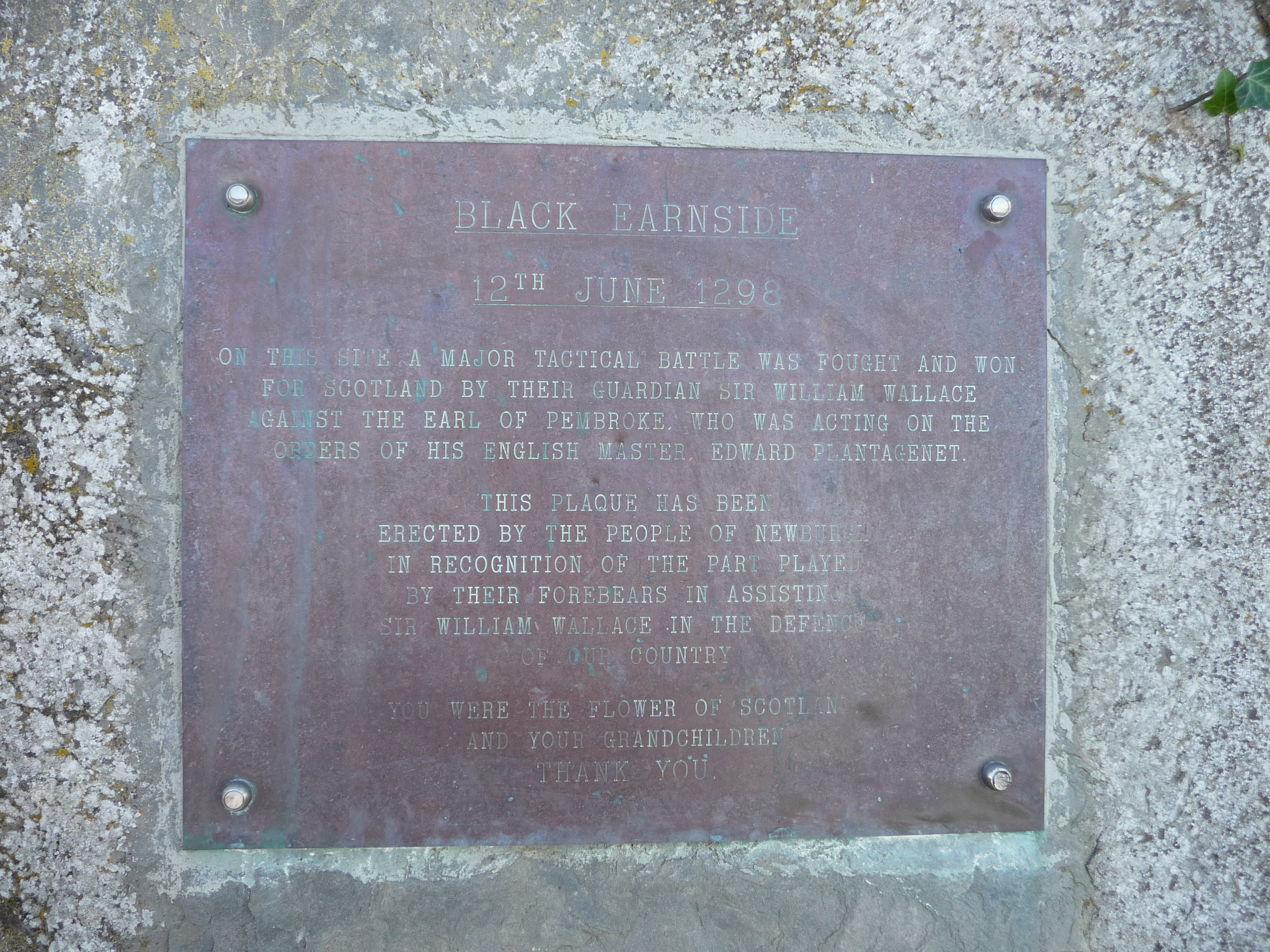
Plaque commemorating 'Black Earnside' near Newburgh, Fife, 27 July 2013

To complicate matters further, there is a plaque at NO 26298 19407 in Fife, about 2 1/2 miles (4 km) NE of Newburgh in a lay-by on the unclassified road to Gauldry, which claims that on 12 June 1298 Wallace defeated the Earl of Pembroke here at a site apparently called "Black Earnside". However it is not clear that this has any basis in contemporary records, and raises some problems, among them that Wallace was at the Battle of Falkirk the following month, and the Earldom of Pembroke was vacant at that time. The name "Black Earnside" is not mentioned on the Ordnance Survey maps of the area and the site is not in any case in Earnside, the River Earn having flowed into the River Tay some 4 1/2 miles (7 km) upstream of the site. Historic Environment Scotlsand's archaeological notes state "There is no good historical evidence for this battle".
