= Wallace Monument =

Tower on the summit of Abbey Craig in Scotland

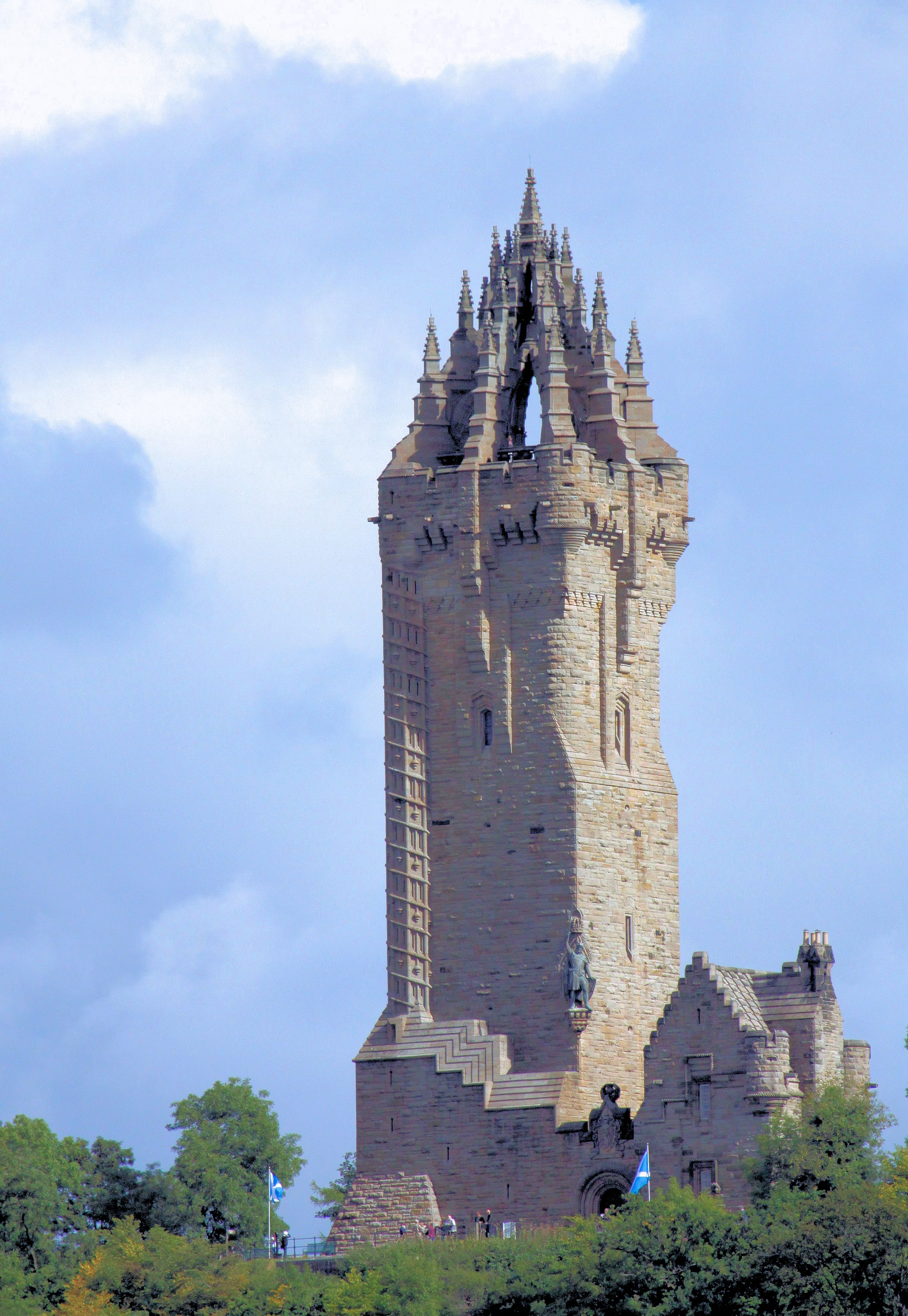
- The tower in 2013

General information
- Type: Tower
- Architectural style: Victorian Gothic
- Location: Abbey Craig, Stirling, Scotland
- Coordinates: 56°8′19″N 3°55′13″W
- Named for: William Wallace
- Groundbreaking: 1861
- Completed: 1869
- Cost: £18,000

Height
- Height: 67 m (220 ft)

Technical details
- Material: Sandstone
- Floor count: 4

Design and construction
- Architect: John Thomas Rochead

Website
- nationalwallacemonument.com

Listed Building – Category A
- Official name: Wallace Monument Abbey Craig
- Designated: 4 November 1965
- Reference no.: LB41118

The National Wallace Monument (generally known as the Wallace Monument) is a 67 m (220 ft) tower on the shoulder of the Abbey Craig, a hilltop overlooking Stirling in Scotland. It commemorates Sir William Wallace, a 13th- and 14th-century Scottish knight.

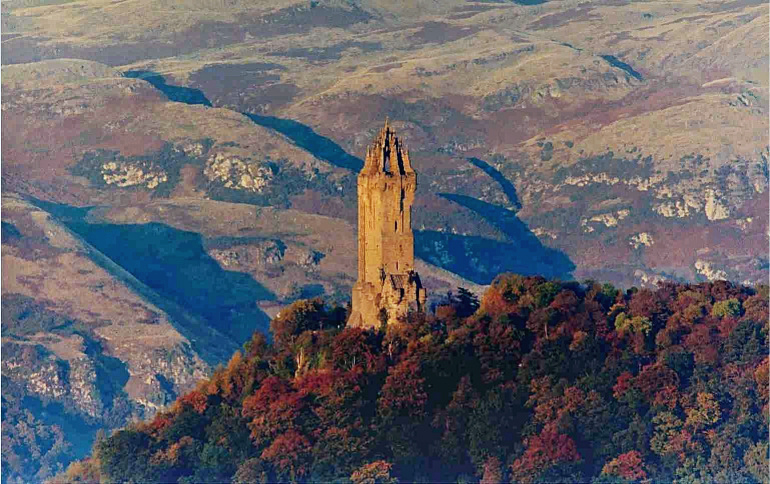
National Wallace Monument and Ochil Hills in autumn

The tower is open to the public for an admission fee. Visitors approach by foot from the base of the crag on which it stands. On entry there are 246 steps to the final observation platform, with three exhibition rooms within the body of the tower. The tower is not accessible to disabled visitors.

== History ==
The tower was constructed following a fundraising campaign, which accompanied a resurgence of Scottish national identity in the 19th century. The campaign was begun in Glasgow in 1851 by Rev Charles Rogers, who was joined by William Burns. Burns took sole charge from around 1855 following Rogers' resignation. In addition to public subscription, it was partially funded by contributions from a number of foreign donors, including Italian national leader Giuseppe Garibaldi. The Victorian Gothic monument was created by architect John Thomas Rochead.

The foundation stone was laid in 1861 by the Duke of Atholl in his role as Grand Master Mason of Scotland, with a short speech given by Sir Archibald Alison. Abbey Craig, a volcanic crag above Cambuskenneth Abbey, was chosen as the location of the tower, said to have been the point from which Wallace watched the gathering of the army of King Edward I of England just before the Battle of Stirling Bridge in 1297.

The sandstone tower, which is 67 metres (220 feet) tall, took eight years to build. It was completed in 1869 and cost £18,000 (about £1.8million in 2024).

== Visitor attraction ==
The monument is open to the general public. Visitors climb the 246-step spiral staircase to the viewing gallery inside the monument's crown, which provides expansive views of the Ochil Hills and the Forth Valley.

A number of artifacts believed to have belonged to Wallace are on display inside the monument, including the Wallace Sword, a 1.63 m (5 ft 4 in) longsword weighing 2.35 kilograms (5 pounds 3 ounces). Inside is also a Hall of Heroes, a series of busts of famous Scots, effectively a small national Hall of Fame. The heroes are Robert the Bruce, George Buchanan, John Knox, Allan Ramsay, Robert Burns, Robert Tannahill, Adam Smith, James Watt, Sir Walter Scott, William Murdoch, Sir David Brewster, Thomas Carlyle, Hugh Miller, Thomas Chalmers, David Livingstone, and W. E. Gladstone. In 2017 it was announced that Mary Slessor and Maggie Keswick Jencks would be the first heroines to be celebrated in the hall.

== Sculptures of William Wallace ==
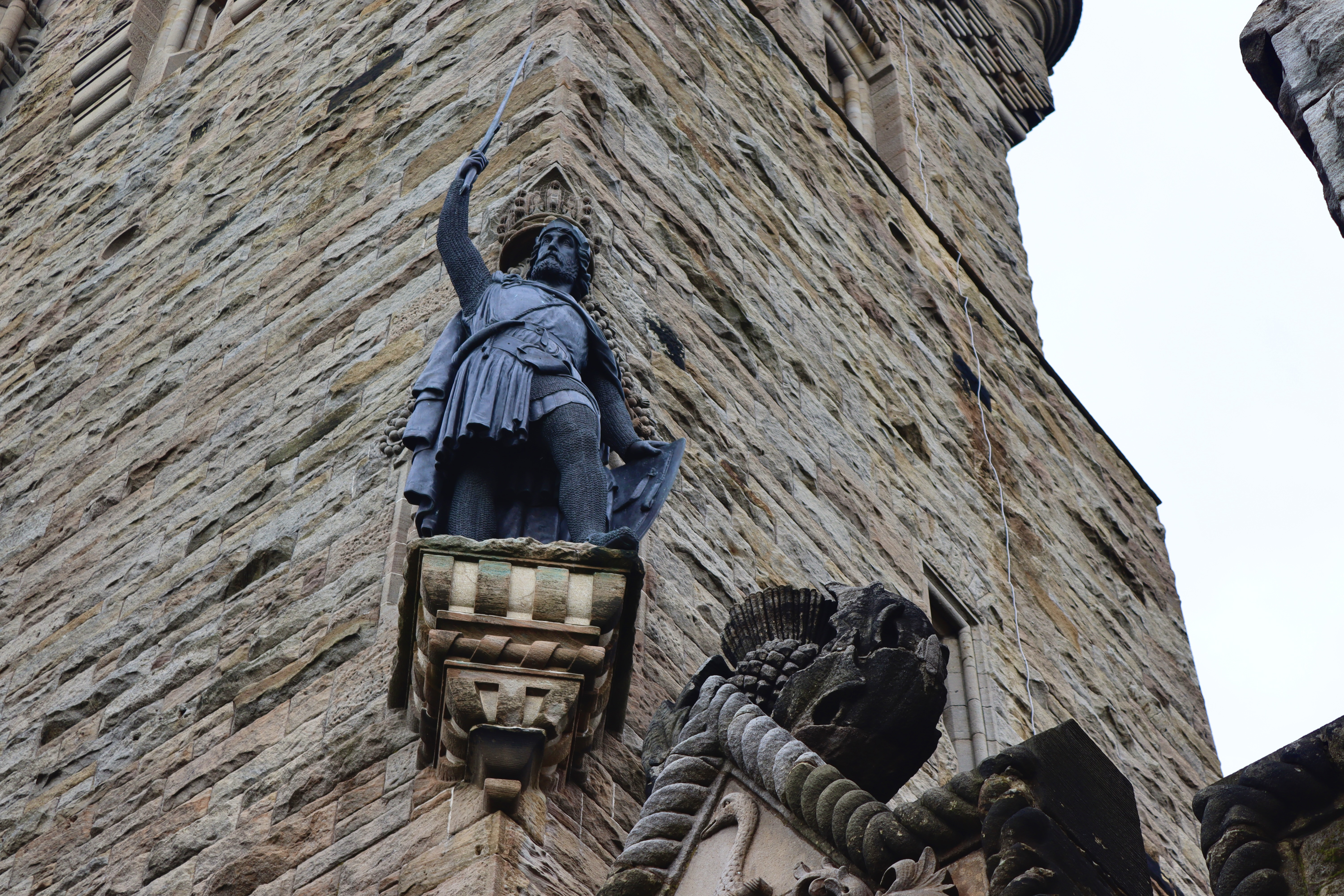
Stevenson's statue of Wallace on the monument in May 2024

The original Victorian statue of Wallace stands on the corner of the monument and is by the Edinburgh sculptor David Watson Stevenson.

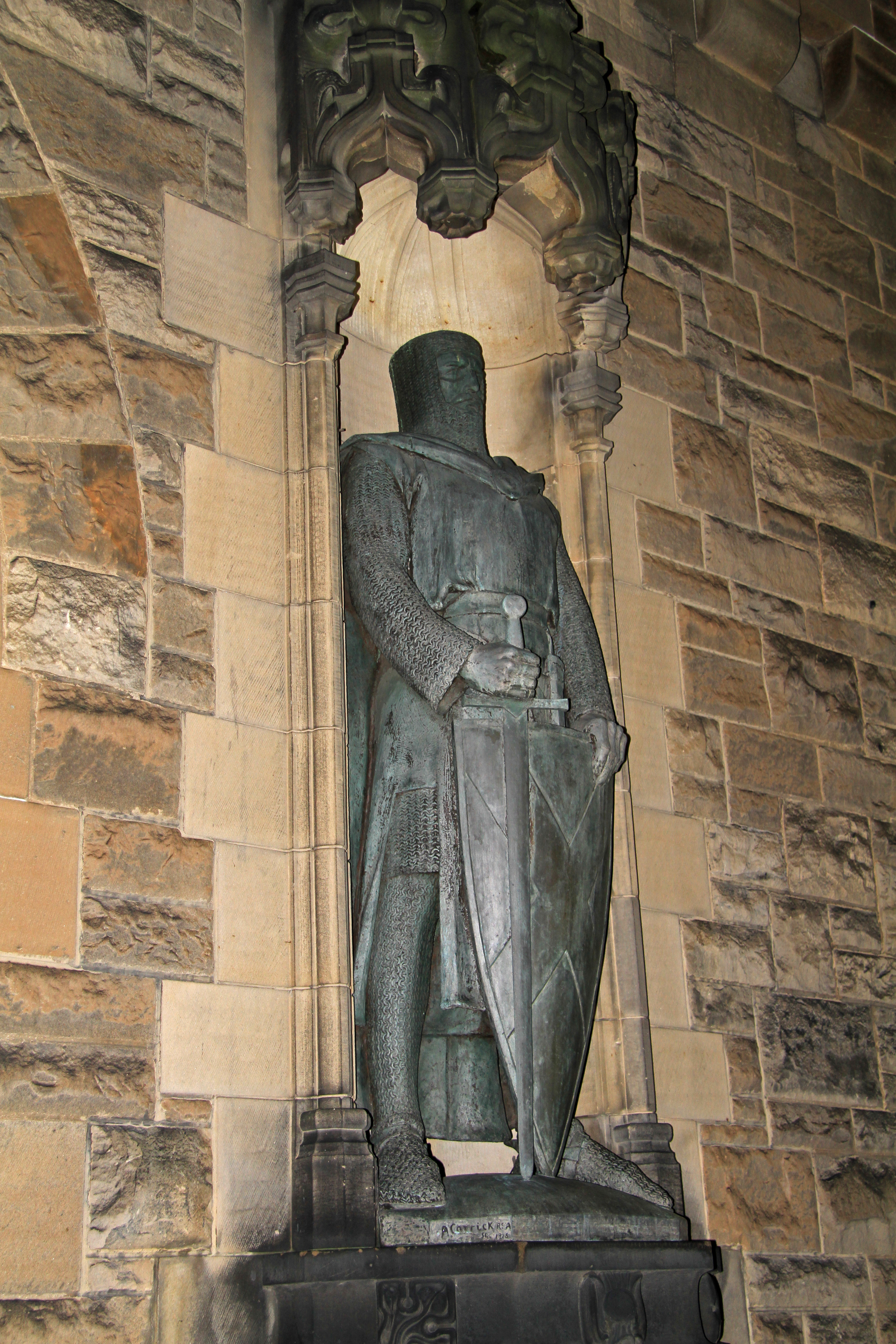
Sir William Wallace statue at Edinburgh Castle gate

=== Braveheart ===
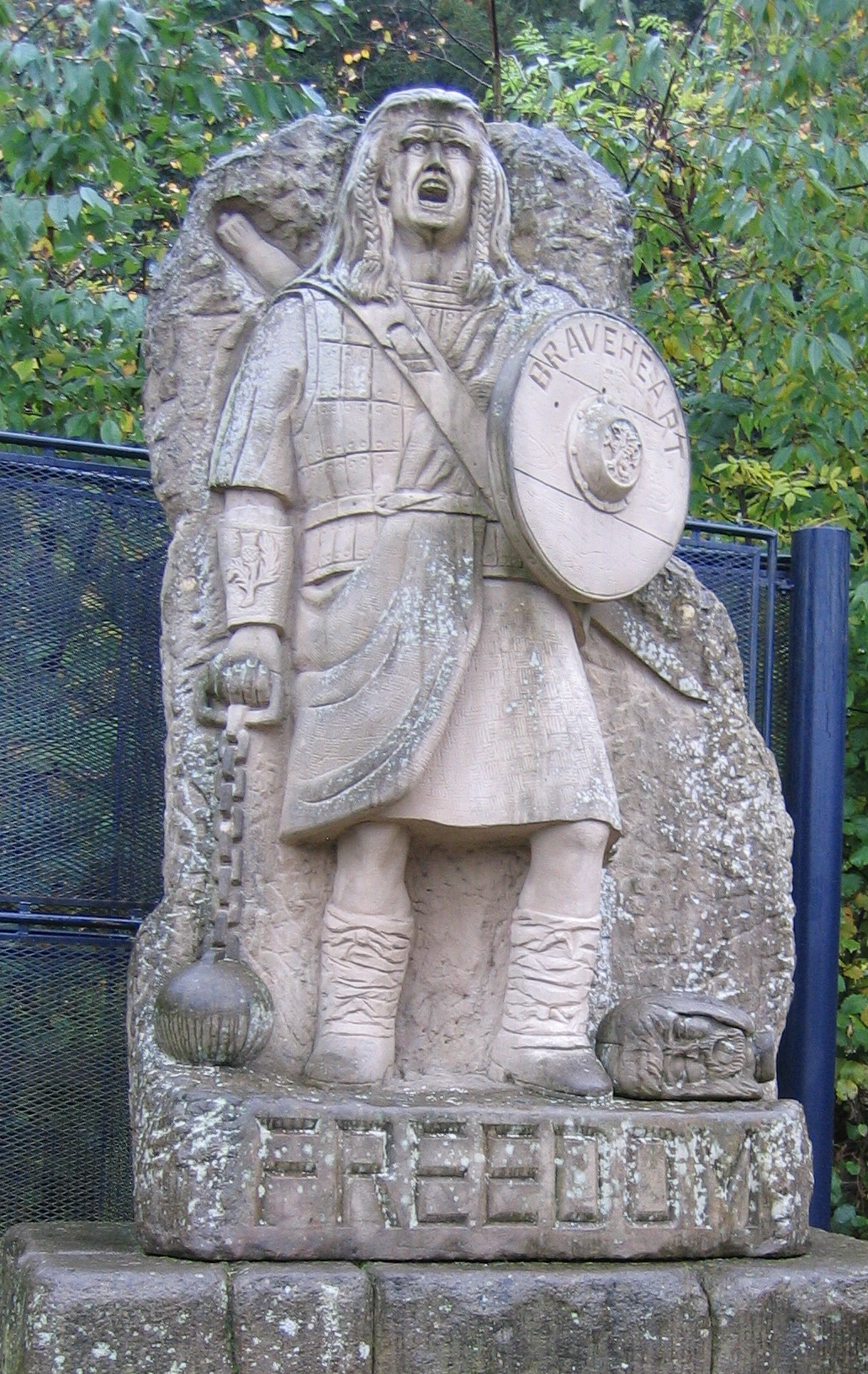
Tom Church's statue "Freedom"

In 1996 Tom Church carved a statue of Wallace called "Freedom", which was inspired by the film Braveheart. It has the face of Mel Gibson, the actor who played William Wallace in the film. Church leased the statue to Stirling Council, who in 1997 installed it in the car park of the visitor centre at the foot of the craig. The statue was deeply unpopular, being described as "among the most loathed pieces of public art in Scotland". It was regularly vandalised before being placed in a cage to prevent further damage. Plans to expand the visitor centre, including a new restaurant and reception, led to the unpopular statue's removal in 2008. It was returned to Church, who, after an unsuccessful attempt to sell it at auction, reportedly offered it to Donald Trump's Menie estate golf resort. However, it remained in the garden of the sculptor's home, where it was incorporated into a replica of a castle, and with additions to it that included the head of the decapitated governor of York. In April 2016, it was reported in local press that the statue might be moved to Ardrossan's old Barony Church. In September 2021, it was moved to Glebe Park stadium in Brechin.

== See also ==
- Statue of William Wallace, Aberdeen
- Wallace's Monument, Ayrshire
- Statue of William Wallace, Bemersyde
- National Monument of Scotland
