= Battle of Stirling Bridge =

Battle of the First War of Scottish Independence

- Part of the First War of Scottish Independence
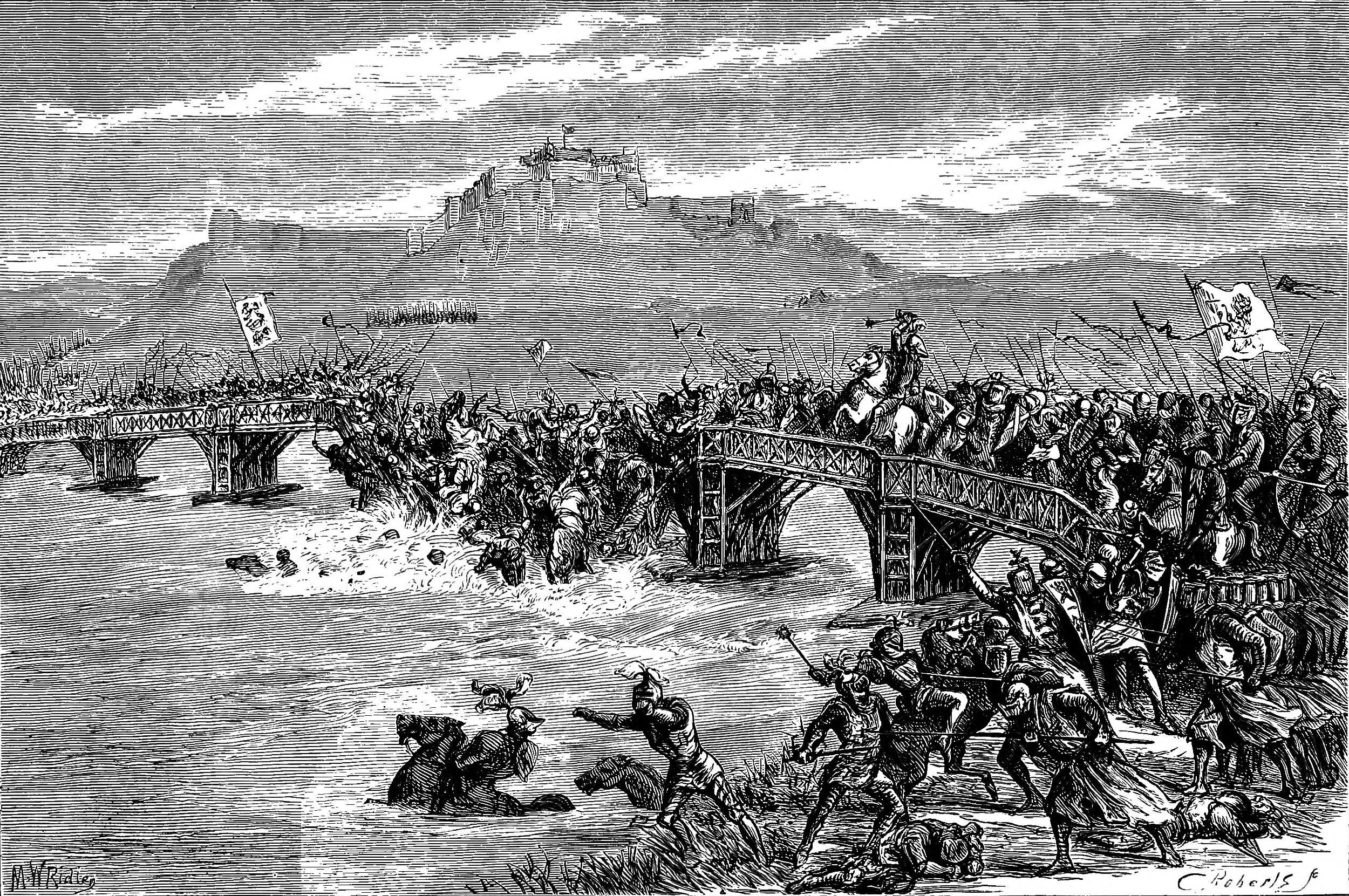
- A Victorian depiction of the battle. The bridge collapse suggests that the artist has been influenced by Blind Harry's account.
Date	11 September 1297
Location	Stirling Bridge, Stirling, Scotland 56°07′48″N 3°56′06″W
Result	Scottish victory

Belligerents
Scotland	England

Commanders and leaders
William Wallace; Andrew de Moray (DOW)	Earl of Surrey; Hugh de Cressingham †

Strength
5,300 to 6,300 men: ~300 cavalry; ~5,000 to 6,000 infantry	9,000 men: ~2,000 cavalry; ~7,000 infantry

Casualties and losses
Unknown	5,000–6,000 killed

Registered battlefield
- Designated: 30 November 2011
- Reference no.: BTL28
- Location within Scotland

The Battle of Stirling Bridge (Scottish Gaelic: Blàr Drochaid Shruighlea) was fought during the First War of Scottish Independence. On 11 September 1297, the forces of Andrew Moray and William Wallace defeated the combined English forces of John de Warenne, 6th Earl of Surrey, and Hugh de Cressingham near Stirling, on the River Forth.

== Background ==
In 1296, John de Warenne, 6th Earl of Surrey, defeated John Comyn, Earl of Buchan in the Battle of Dunbar. King John Balliol surrendered to King Edward I of England at Brechin on 10 July, and the Scottish landholders were made to acknowledge Edward's overlordship. In 1297, Moray initiated a revolt in northern Scotland and by the late summer, controlled Urquhart, Inverness, Elgin, Banff and Aberdeen. Wallace joined Moray in September near Dundee, and they marched to Stirling. Stirling, in the words of Stuart Reid, was "traditionally regarded as the key to Scotland." Meanwhile, Surrey had joined Cressingham in July and both had arrived at Stirling by 9 September 1297. By then, Moray and Wallace had already occupied Abbey Craig.

== Battle ==
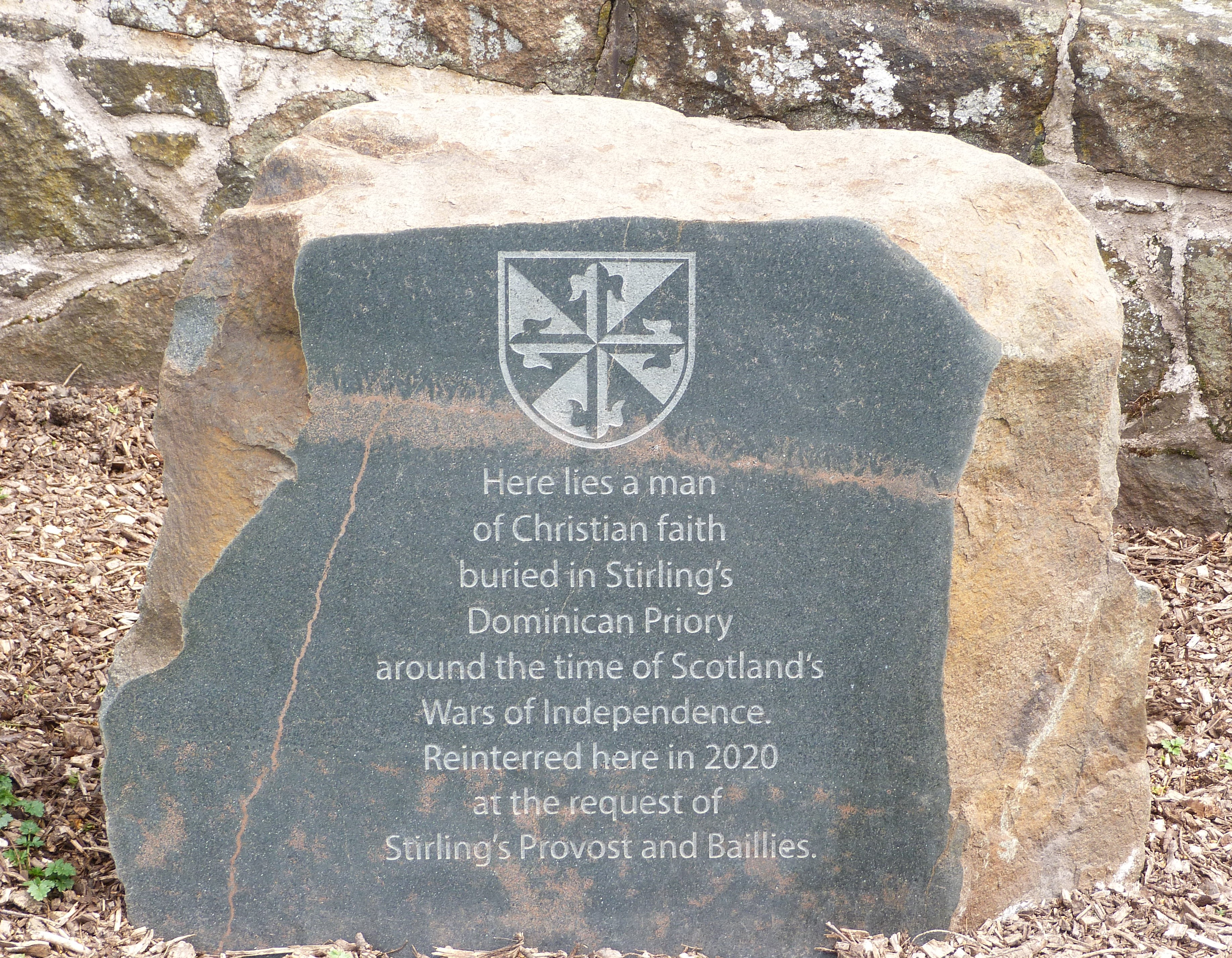
The Goosecroft Friar: A Memorial to a Dominican Friar who may have been a witness to the Scottish Wars of Independence.

Surrey was concerned with the number of Scots he faced, separated by a long causeway and narrow, wooden bridge, over the River Forth near Stirling Castle. Determining that he would be at a tactical disadvantage if he attempted to take his main force across there, he delayed crossing for several days to allow for negotiations and to reconnoiter the area. On 11 September, Surrey had sent James Stewart, and then two Dominican friars as emissaries to the Scots. According to Walter of Guisborough, Wallace reputedly responded with, "We are not here to make peace but to do battle to defend ourselves and liberate our kingdom. Let them come on and we shall prove this to their very beards."

While traditionally it has been argued that the Scots camped on Abbey Craig, it may be more likely they were to the west on Spittal Hill, where the road that led to the Causeway and the Bridge lay. The Scots dominated the soft flat ground north of the river. The English force of English, Welsh and Scots knights, bowmen and foot soldiers camped south of the river. Sir Richard Lundie, a Scots knight who joined the English after the Capitulation of Irvine, offered to outflank the enemy by leading a cavalry force over a ford two miles (three kilometres) upstream, where sixty horsemen could cross at the same time. Hugh de Cressingham, Edward I's treasurer in Scotland, persuaded the Earl to reject that advice and order a direct attack across the bridge.

The small bridge was broad enough to let only two horsemen cross abreast but offered the safest river crossing, as the Forth widened to the east and the marshland of Flanders Moss lay to the west. The Scots waited as the English knights and infantry, led by Cressingham, with Sir Marmaduke Thweng and Sir Richard Waldegrave, began to make their slow progress across the bridge on the morning of 11 September. It would have taken several hours for the entire English army to cross.

Wallace and Moray waited, according to the Chronicle of Hemingburgh, until "as many of the enemy had come over as they believed they could overcome". When a substantial number of the troops had crossed (possibly about 2,000) the attack was ordered. The Scots spearmen came down from the high ground in rapid advance and fended off a charge by the English heavy cavalry and then counterattacked the English infantry. They gained control of the near side of the bridge and cut off the chance of English reinforcements to cross. Caught on the low ground in the loop of the river with no chance of relief or of retreat, most of the outnumbered English on the attacked side were probably killed. A few hundred may have escaped by swimming across the river. Marmaduke Thweng managed to fight his way back across the bridge with some of his men.

Surrey, who was left with a small contingent of archers, had stayed south of the river and was still in a strong position. The bulk of his army remained intact and he could have held the line of the Forth, denying the Scots a passage to the south, but his confidence was gone. After the escape of Sir Marmaduke Thweng, Surrey ordered the bridge to be destroyed, retreated towards Berwick, leaving the garrison at Stirling Castle isolated and abandoning the Lowlands to the rebels. James Stewart, the High Steward of Scotland, and Malcolm, Earl of Lennox, whose forces had been part of Surrey's army, observing the carnage to the north of the bridge, withdrew. Then the English supply train was attacked at The Pows, a wooded marshy area, by James Stewart and the other Scots lords, and many of the fleeing soldiers were killed.

The Stirling Bridge of that time is believed to have been about 180 yards (160 metres) upstream from the 15th-century stone bridge that now crosses the river. Four stone piers have been found underwater just north (56°07′45″N 03°56′12″W) and at an angle to the extant 15th-century bridge, along with man-made stonework on one bank in line with the piers. The site of the fighting was along either side of an earthen causeway leading from the Abbey Craig, atop which the Wallace Monument is now, to the north end of the bridge. The battlefield has been inventoried and protected by Historic Scotland under the Scottish Historical Environment Policy of 2009.

== Aftermath ==
Surrey left William de Warine and Sir Marmaduke Thweng in charge of Stirling Castle, as Surrey abandoned his army, and fled towards Berwick.

The contemporary English chronicler Walter of Guisborough recorded the English losses in the battle as 100 cavalry and 5,000 infantry killed. Scottish casualties in the battle are unrecorded, with the exception of Andrew Moray, who was mortally wounded during the battle, and was dead by November.

The Lanercost Chronicle records that Wallace had a broad strip of Cressingham's skin, "...taken from the head to the heel, to make therewith a baldrick for his sword."

The Scots proceeded to raid the south as far as Durham, England. Wallace was appointed "Guardian of the kingdom of Scotland and commander of its army." Yet, Edward was already planning another invasion of Scotland, which would lead to the Battle of Falkirk.

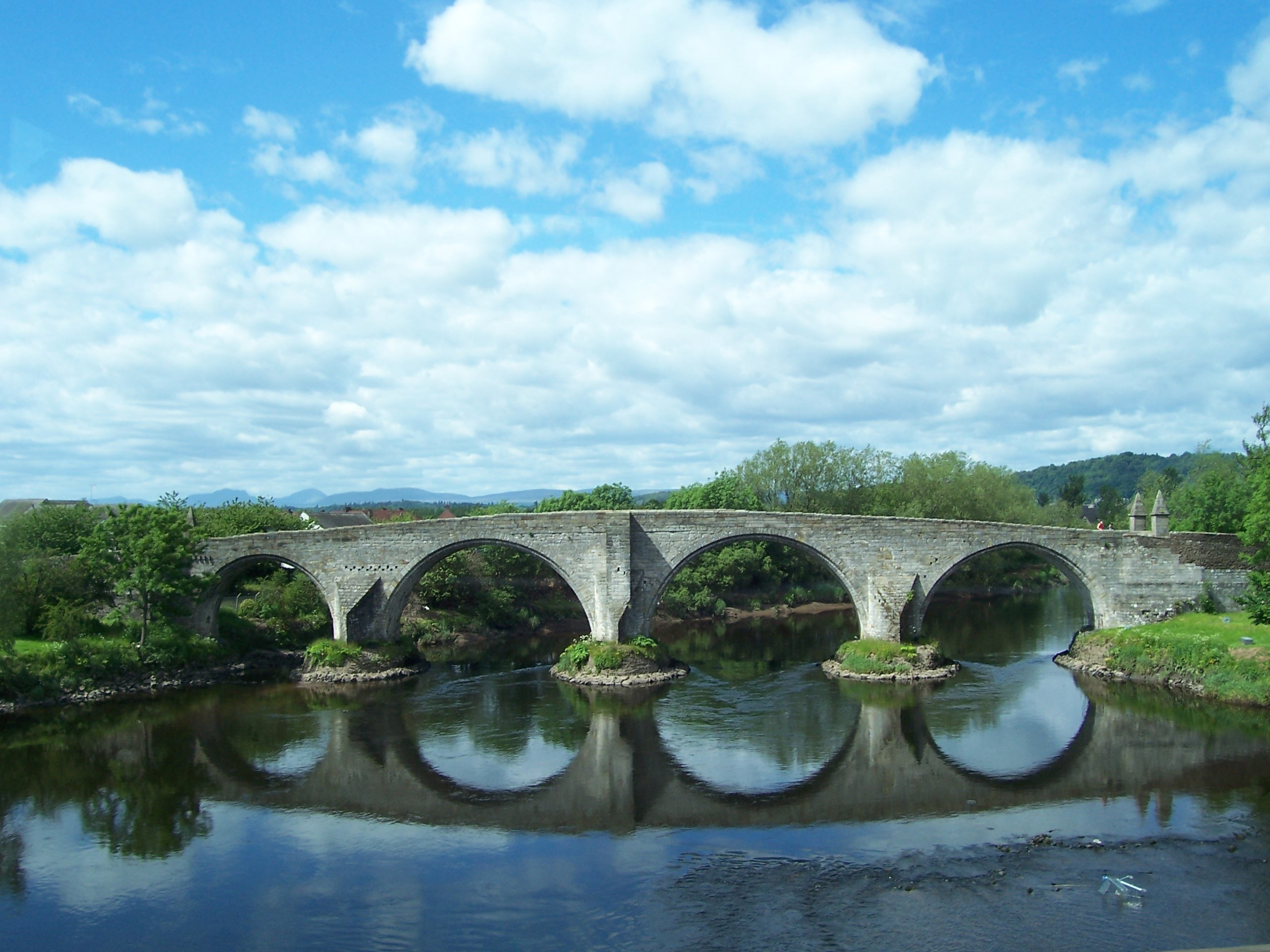
The present-day Stirling Bridge

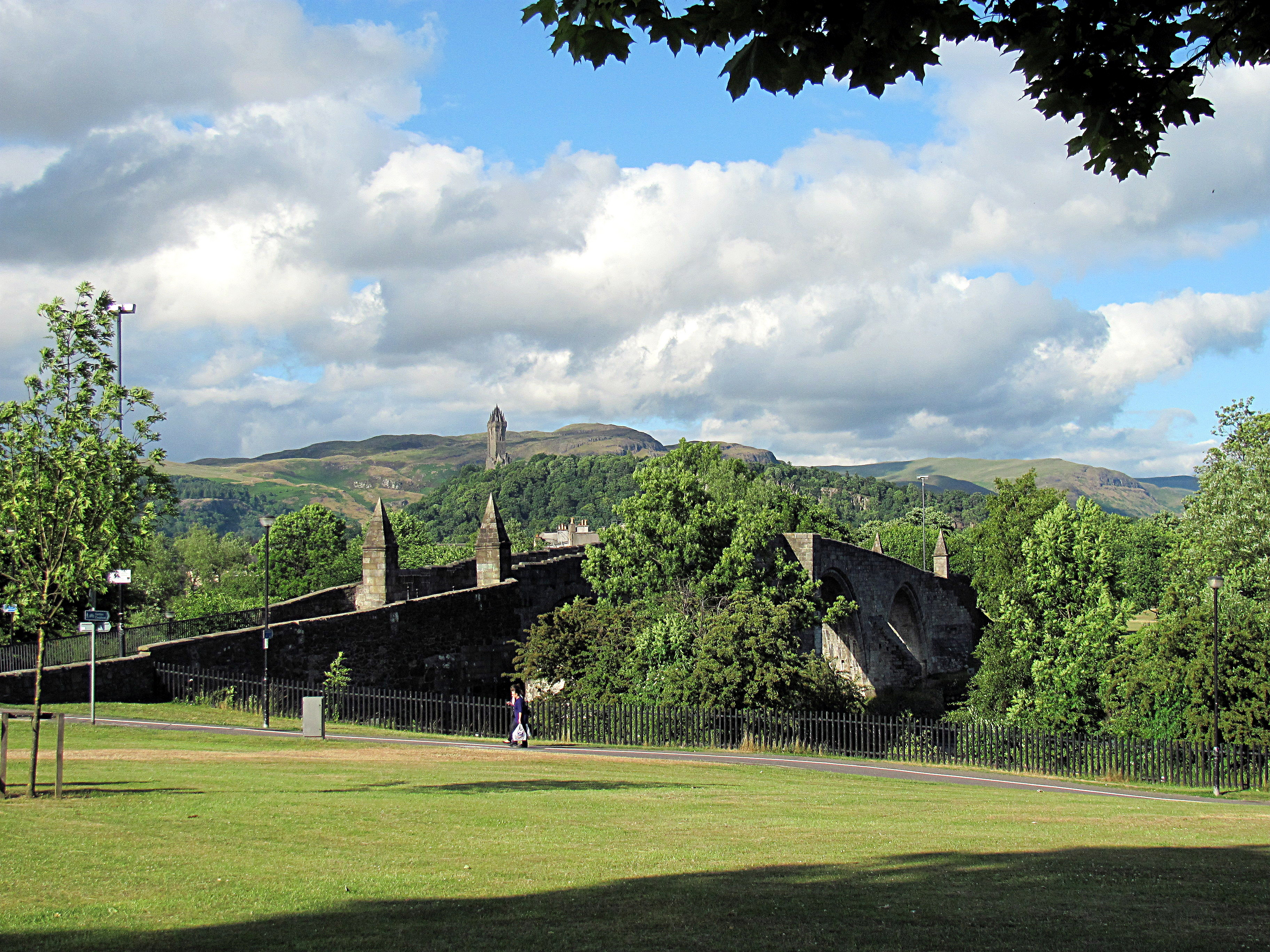
Stirling Bridge from the south bank of the River Forth with the Wallace Monument in the background

== Popular culture ==
The exploits of Wallace were passed on to posterity mainly in the form of tales collected and recounted by the poet Blind Harry, the Minstrel (d. 1492), whose original, probably oral sources were never specified. Blind Harry was active some 200 years after the events described in his The Acts and Deeds of the Illustrious and Valiant Champion Sir William Wallace, c. 1470. The tales were designed to entertain the court of James IV and are undoubtedly a blend of fact and fiction. Like most of his other episodes, Blind Harry's account of the battle of Stirling Bridge is highly improbable, such as his use of figures of biblical magnitude for the size of the participating armies. Nevertheless, his highly dramatised and graphic account of the battle fed the imaginations of subsequent generations of Scottish schoolchildren. Here is his description:

On Saturday they [Moray and Wallace] rode on to the bridge, which was of good plain board, well made and jointed, having placed watches to see that none passed from the army. Taking a wright, the most able workman there, he [Wallace] ordered him to saw the plank in two at the mid streit [middle stretch], so that no-one might walk over it. He then nailed it up quickly with hinges, and dirtied it with clay, to cause it to appear that nothing had been done. The other end he so arranged that it should lie on three wooden rollers, which were so placed, that when one was out the rest would fall down. The wright, himself, he ordered to sit there underneath, in a cradle, bound on a beam, to loose the pin when Wallace let him know by blowing a horn when the time was come. No one in all the army should be allowed to blow but he himself.

Hugh Cressingham leads on the vanguard with twenty thousand likely men to see. Thirty thousand the Earl of Warren had, but he did then as wisdom did direct, all the first army being sent over before him. Some Scottish men, who well knew this manner of attack, bade Wallace sound, saying there were now enough. He hastened not, however, but steadily observed the advance until he saw Warren's force thickly crowd the bridge. Then from Jop he took the horn and blew loudly, and warned John the Wright, who thereupon struck out the roller with skill; when the pin was out, the rest of it fell down. Now arose an hideous outcry among the people, both horses and men, falling into the water. (...)

On foot and bearing a great sharp spear, Wallace went amongst the thickest of the press and aimed a stroke at Cressingham in his corslet, which was brightly polished. The sharp head of the spear pierced right through the plates and through his body, stabbing him beyond rescue; thus was that chieftain struck down to death. With the stroke Wallace bore down both man and horse.

The English army although ready for battle, lost heart when their chieftain was slain and many openly began to flee. Yet, worthy men abode in the place until ten thousand were slain. Then the remainder fled, not able to abide longer, seeking succour in many directions, some east, some west and some fled to the north. Seven thousand full at once floated in the Forth, plunged into the deep and drowned without mercy; none were left alive of all that fell army.

As well as the bridge ploy, Wallace's use of a spear appears to be a fictional element. A two-handed sword [claidheamh dà-làimh, in Gaelic, more commonly claidheamh-mòr or claymore meaning great sword], purporting to be Wallace's, which may contain the original metal from his sword blade, was kept by the Scottish kings and is displayed as a relic in the Wallace Monument.

The potency of these tales can be gauged from the following statement by the poet Robert Burns, writing some three centuries after they were first related.

The two first books I ever read in private, and which gave me more pleasure than any two books I ever read again, were The Life of Hannibal and The History of Sir William Wallace [a modernised version of Blind Harry by William Hamilton of Gilbertfield]. Hannibal gave my young ideas such a turn that I used to strut in raptures up and down after the recruiting drum and bagpipe, and wish myself tall enough that I could be a soldier; while the story of Wallace poured a Scottish prejudice into my veins which will boil along there till the flood-gates of life shut in eternal rest.

The Battle of Stirling Bridge is depicted in the 1995 film Braveheart, but it bears little resemblance to the real battle. Significantly, there is no bridge in the scene (due mainly to the difficulty of filming around the bridge itself), and it replaced the tactics of the battle with ones resembling the Battle of Bannockburn.
