= Charles Rogers (author) =

19th-century Scottish minister and author (1825-1890)

Charles Rogers (1825–1890) was a 19th-century Scottish minister and prolific author. In the second half of his life, he repeatedly ran into trouble for setting up publication societies from which he gained financial benefit.

== Life ==
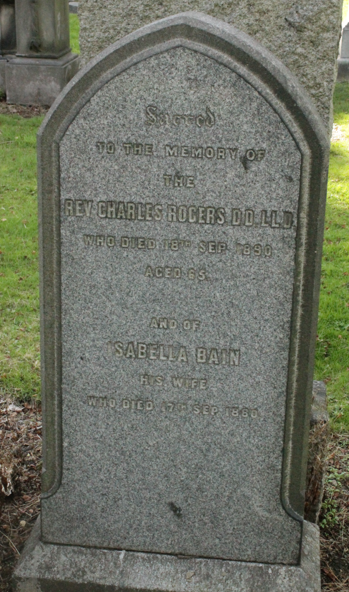
The grave of Rev Charles Rogers, Grange Cemetery

The only son of James Roger(s) (1767–1849), minister of Dunino in Fife, he was born in the manse there on 18 April 1825; His mother, who died at his birth, was Jane, second daughter of William Haldane, minister successively at Glenisla and Kingoldrum. After attending the parish school at Denino for seven years, he matriculated at the University of St Andrews in 1839, and spent seven years there. Licensed by the presbytery of St Andrews in June 1846, he was employed in the capacity of assistant minister at Western Anstruther, Kinglassie, Abbotshall, Dunfermline, Ballingry, and Carnoustie. He then opened a preaching station at the Bridge of Allan, and from January 1855 until 11 August 1863 was chaplain of the garrison at Stirling Castle.

During his time in Stirling, Rogers was elected in 1861 as a member of the town council, and took part in the erection of the Wallace Monument. In 1855 he inaugurated at Stirling a short-lived Scottish Literary Institute. In 1862 he opened the British Christian Institute, for the dissemination of religious tracts and issued a weekly paper, The Workman's Friend, and then monthly serials, The Briton and The Recorder. The scheme ended in 1863, when he founded and edited The Stirling Gazette, but its career was brief. In the aftermath of acrimony he resigned his chaplaincy, went to England, and became a writer.

Rogers went into journalism. In November 1865 set up London a short-lived Naval and Military Tract Society, and he edited a quarterly periodical, The British Bulwark. It was followed by The London Book and Tract Depository, which he carried on until 1874. The Grampian Club, for Scottish literature, history, and antiquities, was inaugurated in London on 2 November 1868, and he was secretary and chief editor until his death.

The Royal Historical Society was established in London on 23 November 1868. Rogers did much to promote it, but ran into the same issues with his financial interests as had occurred in Stirling. He was secretary and "historiographer" to the society until 1880, when he was called to account for running it for his personal benefit.

In 1873 a number of his friends presented Rogers with a house in London, which he called Grampian Lodge. He returned to Scotland some years before his death, which took place at his house in Edinburgh on 18 September 1890, at the age of 65. He is buried in Grange Cemetery in south Edinburgh. The grave lies in the north-east section not far from the main entrance.

== Awards and honours ==
In 1854 Columbia College, New York, awarded Rogers the degree of LLD and in 1881 the University of St Andrews awarded him a DD. He was a member, fellow, or correspondent of numerous learned societies, British, foreign, and colonial, and an associate of the Imperial Archæological Society of Russia.

== Works ==
Rogers' major original writings, classified below as listed in the Dictionary of National Biography, fall under a number of headings: Scottish history, literature, and genealogy. He defended himself against detractors in a pamphlet, Parting Words to the Members, 1881, and reviewed his past life in The Serpent's Track: a Narrative of twenty-two years' Persecution (1880). He edited eight volumes of the Historical Society's Transactions, in which he published much himself.

=== Historical and biographical ===
- Notes in the History of Sir Jerome Alexander, 1872.
- Three Scots Reformers, 1874.
- Life of George Wishart, 1875.
- Memorials of the Scottish House of Gourlay, 1888.
- Memorials of the Earls of Stirling and House of Alexander, 2 vols. 1877.
- The Book of Wallace, 2 vols. 1889.
- The Book of Burns, 3 vols. 1889–91.

=== Topographical ===
- History of St. Andrews, 1849.
- A Week at the Bridge of Allan, 1851; 10th edit. 1865.
- The Beauties of Upper Strathearn, 1854.
- Ettrick Forest and the Ettrick Shepherd, 1860.

=== Genealogical ===
- Genealogical Chart of the Family of Bain, 1871.
- The House of Roger, 1872.
- Memorials of the Strachans of Thornton and Family of Wise of Hillbank, 1873.
- Robert Burns and the Scottish House of Burnes, 1877.
- Sir Walter Scott and Memorials of the Haliburtons, 1877.
- The Scottish House of Christie, 1878.
- The Family of Colt and Coutts, 1879.
- The Family of John Knox, 1879.
- The Scottish Family of Glen, 1888.

=== Ecclesiastical ===
- Historical Notices of St. Anthony's Monastery, Leith, 1849.
- History of the Chapel Royal of Scotland, 1882.

=== Social ===
- Familiar Illustrations of Scottish Life, 1861; 2nd edit. 1862.
- Traits and Stories of the Scottish People, 1867.
- Scotland, Social and Domestic, 1869.
- A Century of Scottish Life, 1871.
- Monuments and Monumental Inscriptions in Scotland, 2 vols. 1871–2.
- Social Life in Scotland, 3 vols. 1884–6.

=== Religious ===
- Christian Heroes in the Army and Navy, 1867.
- Our Eternal Destiny, 1868.

=== Poetical ===
- The Modern Scottish Minstrel, 6 vols. 1855–7.
- The Sacred Minstrel, 1859.
- The Golden Sheaf, 1867.
- Lyra Britannica, 1867.
- Life and Songs of the Baroness Nairne, 1869.

=== Autobiographical and general ===
- Issues of Religious Rivalry, 1866.
- Leaves from my Autobiography, 1876.
- The Serpent's Track, 1880.
- Parting Words to the Members of the Royal Historical Society, 1881.
- Threads of Thought, 1888.
- The Oak, 1868.

=== Editions ===
Rogers also edited:

- Aytoun's Poems, 1844.
- Campbell's Poems, 1870.
- Sir John Scot's Staggering State of Scottish Statesmen, 1872.
- Poetical Remains of King James, 1873.
- Hay's Estimate of the Scottish Nobility.
- Glen's Poems, 1874.
- Diocesan Registers of Glasgow, 2 vols. 1875 (with Joseph Bain).
- Boswelliana, 1874.
- Register of the Church of Crail, 1877.
- Events in the North of Scotland, 1635 to 1645, 1877.
- Chartulary of the Cistercian Priory of Coldstream, 1879.
- Rental-book of the Cistercian Abbey of Cupar-Angus, 1880.
- The Earl of Stirling's Register of Royal Letters, 2 vols. 1884–5.

== Family ==
On 14 December 1854, Rogers married Isabella Bain (d. 1880), the eldest daughter of John Bain of St Andrews.
