= Hugh de Cressingham =

13th-century English nobleman

- Arms of Hugh de Cressingham; Argent, three swans in pale sable, beaked gules.
- Died: 11 September 1297
- Issue: Alice de Cressingham

Sir Hugh de Cressingham (died 11 September 1297) was the treasurer of the English administration in Scotland from 1296 to 1297. He was an adviser to John de Warenne, 6th Earl of Surrey at the Battle of Stirling Bridge. He suggested a full-scale attack across the bridge, which cost the English the battle and led to his death.

== Life ==
Cressingham was a son of William de Cressingham. Hugh was a clerk and one of the officers of the English exchequer, was employed in a matter arising from some wrongs done to the abbot of Ramsey in 1282; he was attached to the household of Eleanor of Castile, queen of Edward I, was her steward, and one of her bailiffs for the barony of Haverford. In 1292 the king employed him to audit the debts due to his dead father, Henry III, and in that and during the next three years he was the head of the justices itinerant for the northern counties. He was presented to the parsonage of Chalk, Kent, by the prior and convent of Norwich, and held the rectory of Doddington in the same county (Hasted); he was also rector of ‘Ruddeby’ (Rudby in Cleveland), and held prebends in several churches (Hemingburgh).

In 1296 Edward appointed Cressingham treasurer of the kingdom, charging him to spare no expense necessary for the complete reduction of Scotland.

Cressingham was killed during the Battle of Stirling Bridge on 11 September 1297. According to legend, his body was flayed by the Scots as he had flayed Scottish war prisoners, and William Wallace made a sword belt out of his skin. The Lanercost Chronicle states the Scots dried and cured his hide and

of his skin William Wallace caused a broad strip to be taken from the head to the heel, to make therewith a baldrick for his sword.

The Scalacronica merely states that

the Scots caused him to be flayed, and in token of their hatred made thongs of his skin.

Walter of Hemingburgh recorded,

The Scots flayed him and divided his skin among themselves in moderate-sized pieces, certainly not as relics, but for hatred of him.

== Family and issue ==
He is known to have left a daughter Alice, who married Robert de Aspale and had issue.
