= Walter of Guisborough =

14th-century English chronicler

Walter of Guisborough was a canon regular of Gisborough Priory in Yorkshire and English chronicler of the 14th century. His chronicle has historical importance.

== Work ==
The Chronicle of Walter of Guisborough, also previously and mistakenly known as the Chronicle of Walter of Hemingford or Hemingburgh, covers the period of English history from the Conquest (1066) to the 19th year of Edward III, excepting the years 1316–1326. It ends with the title of a chapter in which it was proposed to describe the Battle of Crécy (1346), but the chronicler seems to have died before the required information reached him. There is, however, some controversy as to whether the later portions, which are lacking in some of the manuscripts, are by him.

In compiling the first part, he apparently used the histories of Eadmer, Roger of Hoveden, Henry of Huntingdon, and William of Newburgh; but the reigns of the three Edwards are original, composed from personal observation and information. There are several manuscripts of the history extant, the best perhaps being that presented to the College of Arms by the Earl of Arundel.

One of the work's features is that it preserves copies of the great charters. Its versions have supplied deficiencies and cleared up obscurities in copies from other sources.

The first three books were published by Thomas Gale in 1687, in his Historiae Anglicanae scriptores quinque, and the remainder by Thomas Hearne in 1731. The first portion was again published in 1848 by the English Historical Society, under the title Chronicon Walteri de Hemingburgh, vulgo Hemingford nuncupati, de gestis regum Angliae, edited by Hans Claude Hamilton.
