= William Wallace =

Scottish knight (1270–1305)

Sir William Wallace
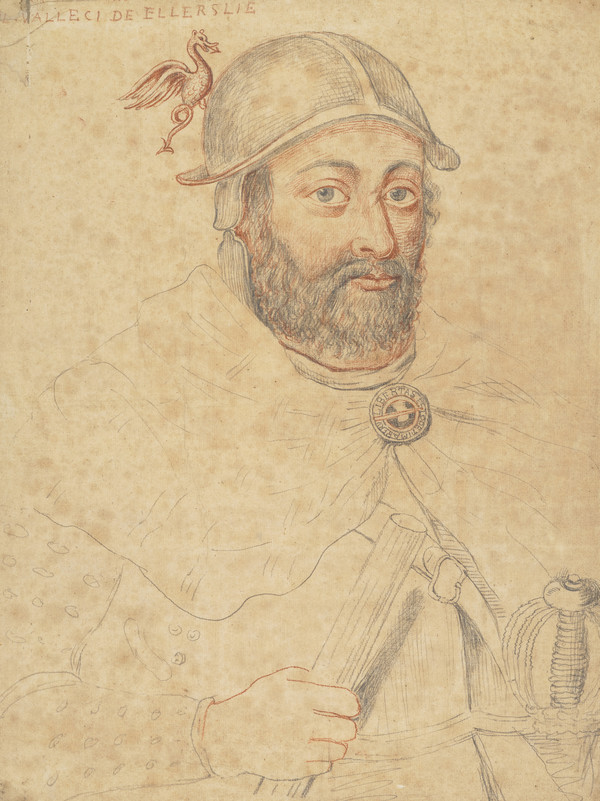
- First known depiction of Sir William Wallace by the 11th Earl of Buchan

Guardian of Scotland (Second Interregnum)
- In office 1297–1298
- Preceded by: John Balliol (as King of the Scots)
- Succeeded by: Robert the Bruce; John Comyn

Personal details
- Born: c. 1270 Elderslie, Renfrewshire, Scotland (according to tradition)
- Died: 23 August 1305 (aged about 35) Smithfield, London, England
- Cause of death: Hanged, drawn and quartered
- Resting place: London, in an unmarked grave
- Spouse: Marion Braidfute (disputed)
- Occupation: Military leader

Military service
- Allegiance: Kingdom of Scotland
- Years of service: 1297–1305
- Rank: Commander
- Battles/wars: First War of Scottish Independence; Action at Lanark; Raid on Scone; Battle of Stirling Bridge; Battle of Falkirk; Battle of Happrew; Action at Earnside

Sir William Wallace (Scottish Gaelic: Uilleam Uallas, pronounced [ˈɯʎam ˈuəl̪ˠəs̪]; Norman French: William le Waleys; c. 1270 – 23 August 1305) was a Scottish knight who became one of the main leaders during the First War of Scottish Independence.

Along with Andrew Moray, Wallace defeated an English army at the Battle of Stirling Bridge in September 1297. He was appointed Guardian of Scotland and served until his defeat at the Battle of Falkirk in July 1298. In August 1305, Wallace was captured in Robroyston, near Glasgow, and handed over to King Edward I of England, who had him hanged, drawn and quartered for high treason and crimes against English civilians.

Since his death, Wallace has obtained a legendary status beyond his homeland. He is the protagonist of Blind Harry's 15th-century epic poem The Wallace and the subject of literary works by Jane Porter and Sir Walter Scott, and of the Academy Award-winning film Braveheart.

== Background ==
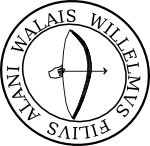
Personal seal of Sir William Wallace, found on a letter written on 11 October 1297, to the mayor of Lübeck, Germany

William Wallace was a member of the lesser nobility, but little is definitely known of his family history or even his parentage. William's own seal, found on a letter sent to the Hanse city of Lübeck in 1297, gives his father's name as Alan Wallace. This Alan Wallace may be the same as the one listed in the 1296 Ragman Rolls as a crown tenant in Ayrshire, but there is no additional confirmation. Others have speculated this Alan held Ellerslie, near Kilmarnock, Ayrshire, and if true, the estate could be a possible birthplace for William, though there is no record of Wallaces holding the estate in the mid-13th century. Blind Harry's late-15th-century poem offers an alternate father for William, a Sir Malcolm of Elderslie, in Renfrewshire, and has similarly given rise to a possible birthplace for William. There is no contemporary evidence linking him with either location, although both areas had connections with the wider Wallace family. Records show early members of the family as holding estates at Riccarton, Tarbolton, Auchincruive in Kyle, and Stenton in East Lothian. They were vassals of James Stewart, 5th High Steward of Scotland, as their lands fell within his territory. It has been claimed that Wallace's brothers Malcolm and John are known from other sources, but there is a lack of verifiable evidence for John's relationship with William.

The origins of the Wallace surname and its association with southwest Scotland are also far from certain, other than the name's being derived from Old English wǣlisċ, meaning 'foreigner' or 'Welshman'. It is possible that all the Wallaces in the Clyde area were medieval immigrants from Wales, but, as the term was also used for the Cumbric-speaking Strathclyde kingdom of the Celtic Britons, it seems equally likely that the surname refers to people who were seen as being "Welsh" due to their Cumbric language.

== Military career ==
=== Political crisis in Scotland ===
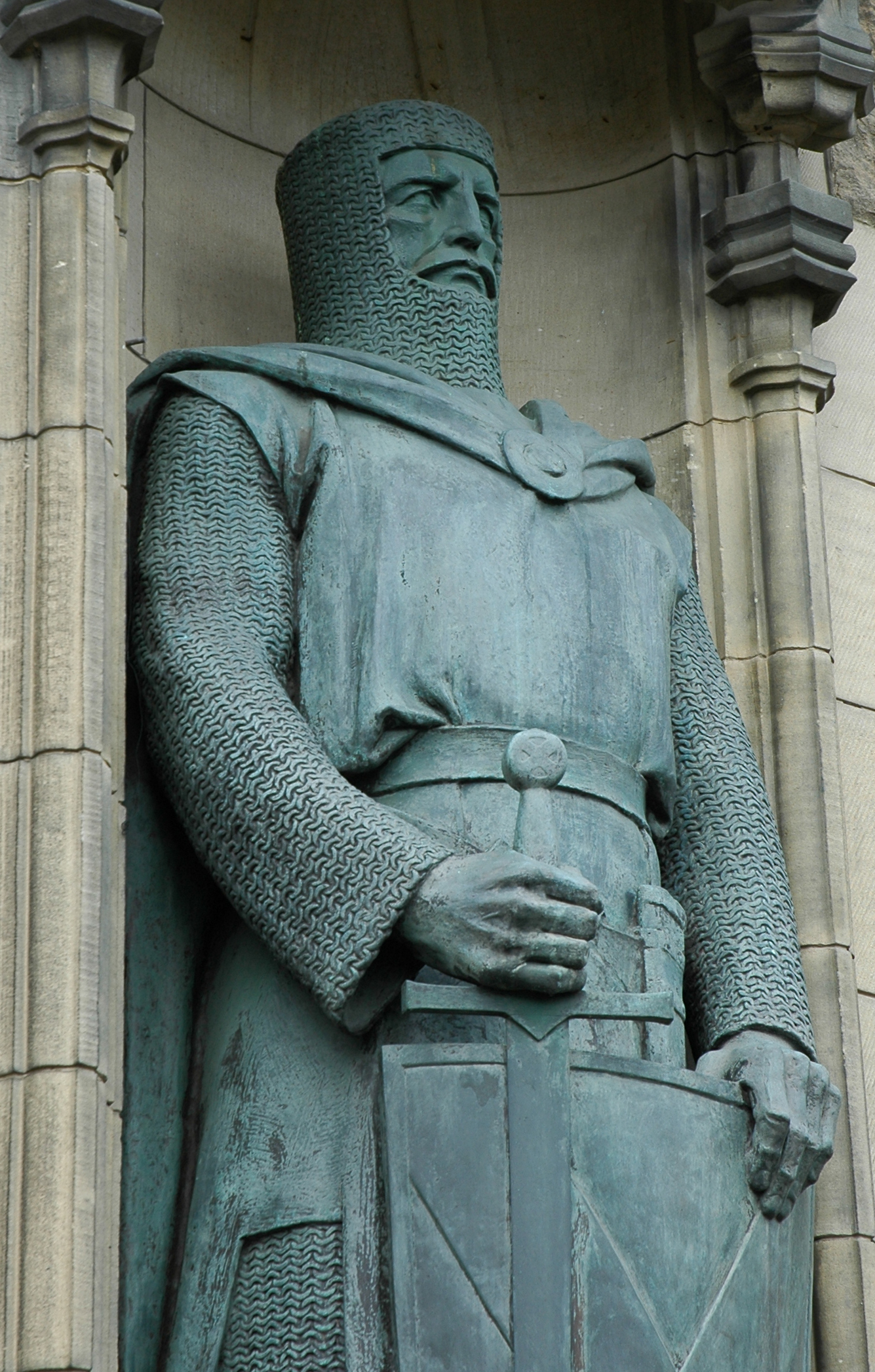
Statue of Wallace at Edinburgh Castle

When Wallace was growing up, King Alexander III ruled Scotland. His reign had seen a period of peace and economic stability. On 19 March 1286, however, Alexander died after falling from his horse. The heir to the throne was Alexander's granddaughter, Margaret, Maid of Norway. As she was still a child and in Norway, the Scottish lords set up a government of guardians. Margaret fell ill on the voyage to Scotland and died in Orkney in late September 1290. The lack of a clear heir led to a period known as the "Great Cause", with a total of thirteen contenders laying claim to the throne. The most credible claims were John Balliol and Robert Bruce, grandfather of the future monarch, Robert the Bruce.

With Scotland threatening to descend into civil war, King Edward I of England was invited in by the Scottish nobility to arbitrate. Before the process could begin, he insisted that all of the contenders recognise him as Lord Paramount of Scotland. In early November 1292, at a great feudal court held in the castle at Berwick-upon-Tweed, judgment was given in favour of John Balliol having the strongest claim in law based on being senior in genealogical primogeniture even though not in proximity of blood.

Edward proceeded to take steps to progressively undermine John's authority, treating Scotland as a feudal vassal state, demanding homage be paid towards himself and military support in his war against France—even summoning King John Balliol to stand before the English court as a common plaintiff. The Scots soon tired of their deeply compromised king, and the direction of affairs was allegedly taken out of his hands by the leading men of the kingdom, who appointed a Council of Twelve—in practice, a new panel of Guardians—at Stirling in July 1295. They went on to conclude a treaty of mutual assistance with France—known in later years as the Auld Alliance.

In retaliation for Scotland's treaty with France, Edward I invaded, storming Berwick-upon-Tweed and commencing the Wars of Scottish Independence. The Scots were defeated at Dunbar and the English took Dunbar Castle on 27 April 1296. Edward forced John to abdicate, which he did at Stracathro near Montrose on 10 July 1296. Here the arms of Scotland were formally torn from John's surcoat, giving him the abiding name of "Toom Tabard" (empty coat). By July, Edward had instructed his officers to receive formal homage from some 1,800 Scottish nobles (many of the rest being prisoners of war at that time).

=== Silent years prior to the Wars of Independence ===
Some historians believe Wallace must have had some earlier military experience in order to lead a successful military campaign in 1297. Campaigns like Edward I of England's wars in Wales might have provided a good opportunity for a younger son of a landholder to become a mercenary soldier. Wallace's personal seal bears the archer's insignia, so he may have fought as an archer in Edward's army.

Walter Bower's mid-15th-century Scotichronicon, states that Wallace was "a tall man with the body of a giant ... with lengthy flanks ... broad in the hips, with strong arms and legs ... with all his limbs very strong and firm". Blind Harry's late 15th-century poem The Wallace, asserts Wallace was seven feet tall, though the historical accuracy of this claim is questionable.

=== Start of the uprising ===
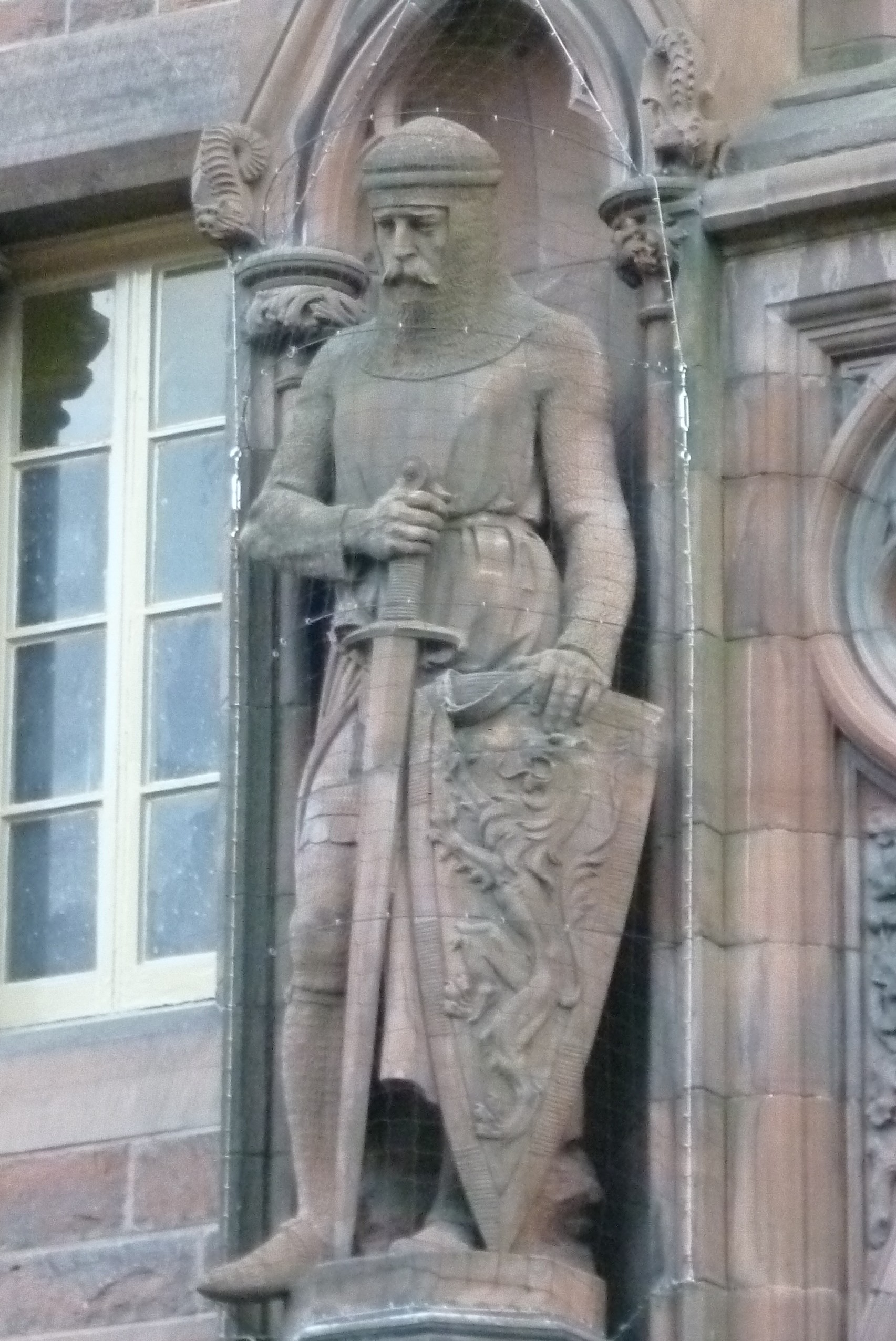
Wallace statue by D. W. Stevenson on the Scottish National Portrait Gallery, Edinburgh

The first act definitely known to have been carried out by Wallace was his killing of William de Heselrig, the English High Sheriff of Lanark, in May 1297. He then joined with William the Hardy, Lord of Douglas, and they carried out the raid of Scone. This was one of several rebellions taking place across Scotland, including those of several Scottish nobles and Andrew Moray in the north.

The uprising suffered a blow when the nobles submitted to the English at Irvine in July. Wallace and Moray were not involved and continued their rebellions. Wallace used the Ettrick Forest as a base for raiding and attacked Wishart's palace at Ancrum. Wallace and Moray met and joined their forces, possibly at the siege of Dundee in early September.

==== Battle of Stirling Bridge ====
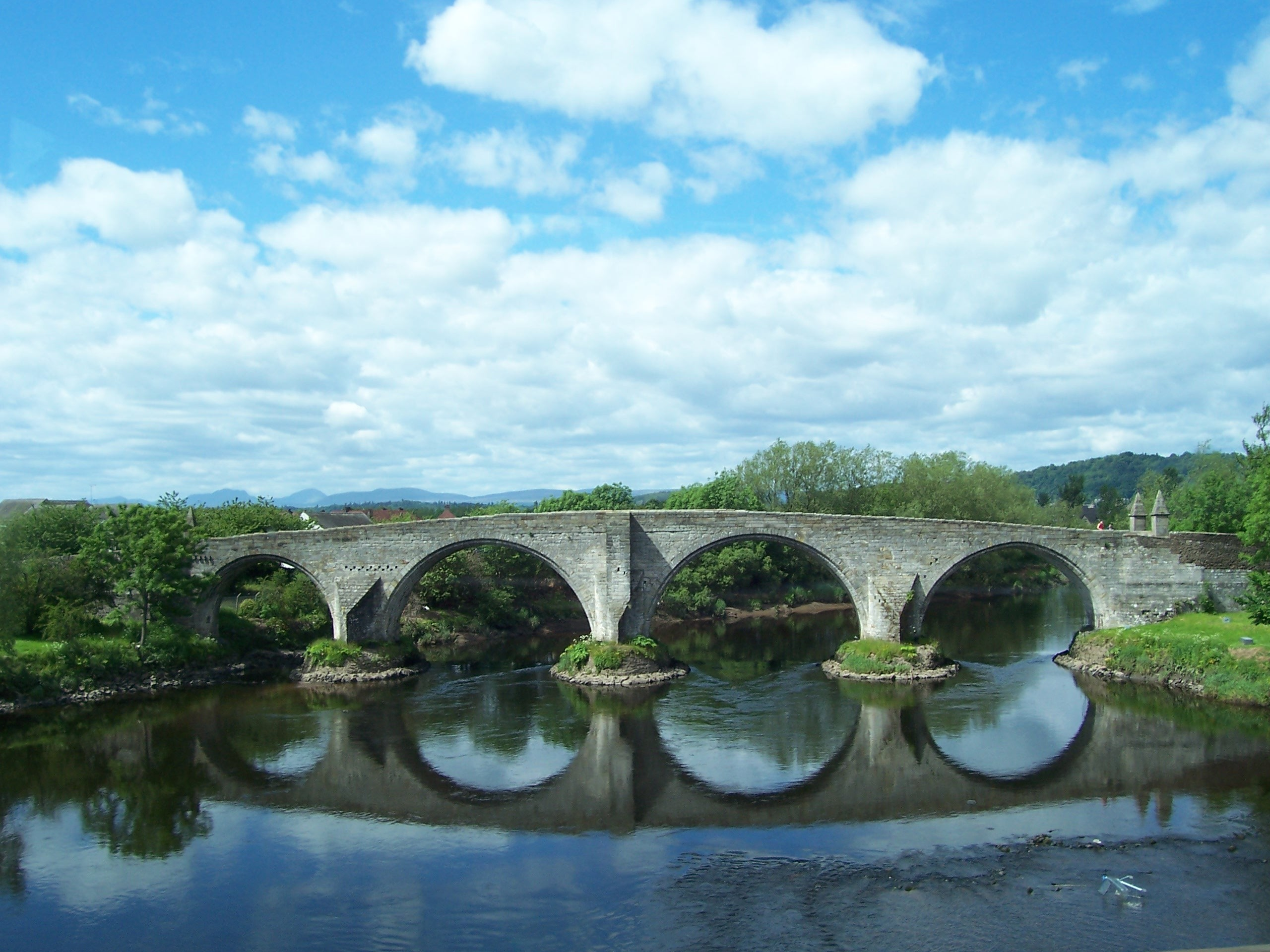
The later Stirling Bridge

On 11 September 1297, an army jointly led by Wallace and Andrew Moray won the Battle of Stirling Bridge. Although vastly outnumbered, the Scottish army routed the English army. The 6th Earl of Surrey's feudal army of 3,000 cavalry and 8,000 to 10,000 infantry met disaster as they crossed over to the north side of the river. The narrowness of the bridge prevented many soldiers from crossing together (possibly as few as three men abreast), so, while the English soldiers crossed, the Scots held back until half of them had passed and then killed the English as quickly as they could cross. The infantry were sent on first, followed by heavy cavalry. The Scots' schiltron formations forced the infantry back into the advancing cavalry. A pivotal charge, led by one of Wallace's captains, caused some of the English soldiers to retreat as others pushed forward, and under the overwhelming weight, the bridge collapsed, and many English soldiers drowned. Thus, the Scots won a significant victory, boosting the confidence of their army. Hugh de Cressingham, Edward's treasurer in Scotland, died in the fighting and it is reputed that his body was subsequently flayed, and the skin cut into small pieces as tokens of the victory. The Lanercost Chronicle records that Wallace had "a broad strip [of Cressingham's skin] ... taken from the head to the heel, to make therewith a baldrick for his sword".

After the battle, Moray and Wallace assumed the title of Guardians of the Kingdom of Scotland on behalf of King John Balliol. Moray died of wounds suffered on the battlefield sometime in late 1297.

Wallace soon mounted an invasion of northern England, crossing into Northumberland. The Scots army followed the English army fleeing south. Caught between two armies, hundreds of refugees fled to safety behind the walls of Newcastle. The Scots laid waste a swathe of countryside before turning west into Cumberland and pillaging all the way to Cockermouth, before Wallace led his men back into Northumberland and fired 700 villages. Wallace then returned from England laden with booty.

In a ceremony, at the 'Kirk o' the Forest' (Selkirk), towards the end of the year, Wallace was knighted. This would have been carried out by one of three Scottish earls— Carrick (Robert the Bruce), Strathearn, or Lennox.

==== Battle of Falkirk ====
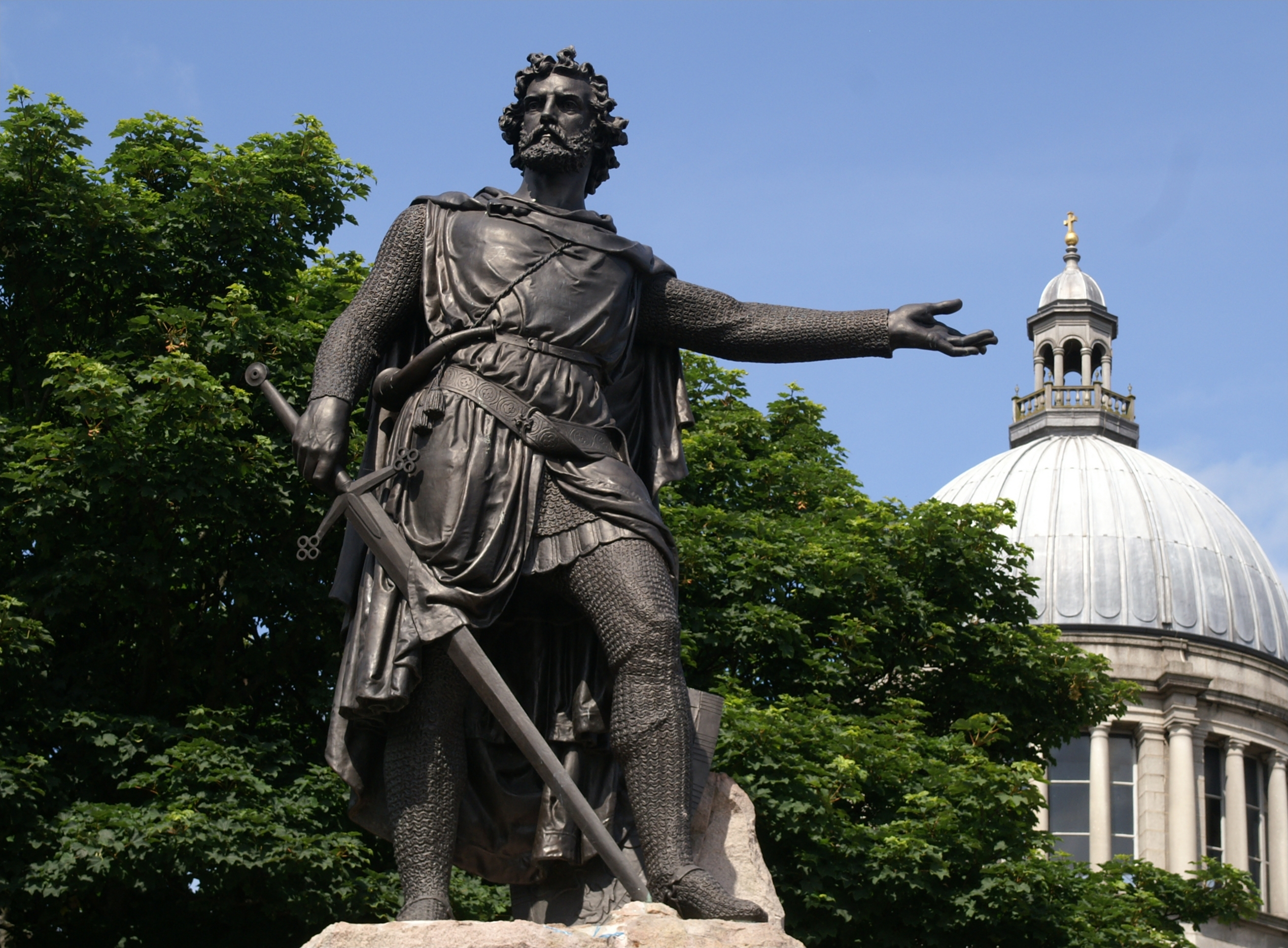
William Wallace statue, Aberdeen

In April 1298, Edward ordered a second invasion of Scotland. Two days prior to the battle 25,781 foot soldiers were paid. More than half of them would have been Welsh. There are no clear cut sources for the presence of cavalry, but it is safe to assume that Edward had roughly 1,500 horses under his command. They plundered Lothian and regained some castles, but failed to bring William Wallace to combat; the Scots shadowed the English army, intending to avoid battle until shortages of supplies and money forced Edward to withdraw, at which point the Scots would harass his retreat. The English quartermasters' failure to prepare for the expedition left morale and food supplies low, and a resulting riot within Edward's own army had to be put down by his cavalry. In July, while planning a return to Edinburgh for supplies, Edward received intelligence that the Scots were encamped nearby at Falkirk, and he moved quickly to engage them in the pitched battle for which he had long hoped.

Wallace arranged his spearmen in four schiltrons—circular, defensive hedgehog formations, probably surrounded by wooden stakes connected with ropes, to keep the infantry in formation. The English, however, employed Welsh longbowmen, who swung tactical superiority in their favour. The English proceeded to attack with cavalry and put the Scottish archers to flight. The Scottish cavalry withdrew as well, due to its inferiority to the English heavy horses. Edward's men began to attack the schiltrons, which were still able to inflict heavy casualties on the English cavalry. It remains unclear whether the infantry shooting bolts, arrows and stones at the spearmen proved the deciding factor, although it is very likely that it was the arrows of Edward's bowmen. Gaps in the schiltrons soon appeared, and the English exploited these to crush the remaining resistance. The Scots lost many men, including John de Graham. Wallace escaped, though his military reputation suffered badly.

By September 1298, Wallace resigned as Guardian of Scotland in favour of Robert the Bruce, Earl of Carrick and future king, and John Comyn, King John Balliol's nephew.

Details of Wallace's activities after this are vague, but there is some evidence that he left on a mission to the court of King Philip IV of France to plead the case for assistance in the Scottish struggle for independence. There is a surviving letter from the French king dated 7 November 1300 to his envoys in Rome demanding that they recommend Sir William to Pope Boniface VIII. It also suggests that Wallace intended to travel to Rome, although it is not known if he did. There is also a report from an English spy at a meeting of Scottish leaders, where they said Wallace was in France.

By 1304, Wallace was back in Scotland and involved in skirmishes at Happrew and Earnside.

=== Capture and execution ===
Wallace's trial in Westminster Hall. Painting by Daniel Maclise.

Wallace evaded capture by the English until 5 August 1305, when John de Menteith, a Scottish knight loyal to Edward, turned Wallace over to English soldiers at Robroyston, near Glasgow, a site commemorated by a small monument in the form of a Celtic cross. Letters of safe conduct from Haakon V of Norway, Philip IV of France and John Balliol, along with other documents, were found in Wallace's possession and delivered to Edward by John de Segrave.

Wallace was transported to London and taken to Westminster Hall. There he was tried for treason, for which his defence was that he, unlike most of the other Scottish leaders, had never sworn allegiance to Edward. He was also charged with committing atrocities against civilians in war, "sparing neither age nor sex, monk nor nun". As a result, the trial has attracted the attention of modern legal scholarship as it is one of the earliest examples of what would now be considered a prosecution for war crimes. It is one of only three known pre-modern trials which raised, in today's terms, issues of international humanitarian law.

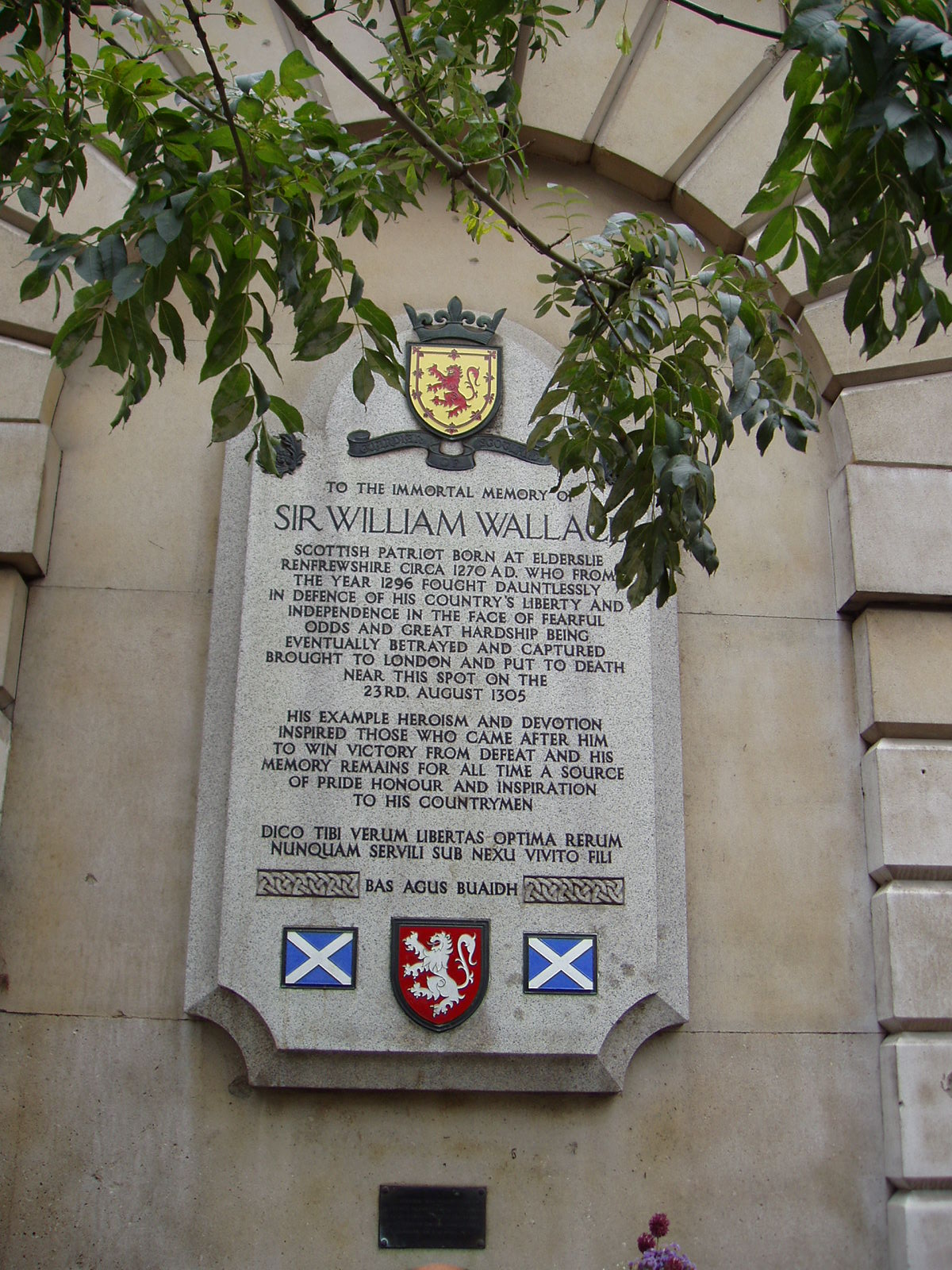
Plaque marking the place of Wallace's execution

Following the trial, on 23 August 1305, Wallace was taken from the hall to the Tower of London, then stripped naked and dragged through the city at the heels of a horse to the Elms at Smithfield. He was hanged, drawn and quartered—strangled by hanging, but released while he was still alive, emasculated, eviscerated (with his bowels burned before him), beheaded, then cut into four parts. Wallace's head was dipped in tar and placed on a spike atop London Bridge. His preserved head was later joined by the heads of his brother John and his compatriots Simon Fraser and John of Strathbogie. Wallace's limbs were displayed, separately, in Newcastle, Berwick, Stirling and Perth. A plaque unveiled 8 April 1956 stands in a wall of St. Bartholomew's Hospital near the site of Wallace's execution at Smithfield. It includes in Latin the words Dico tibi verum libertas optima rerum nunquam servili sub nexu vivito fili ("I tell you the truth: Freedom is what is best. Son, never live your life like a slave"), and in Gaelic Bas Agus Buaidh ("Death and Victory"), an old Scottish battle cry.

In 1869, the Wallace Monument was erected, close to the site of his victory at Stirling Bridge. The Wallace Sword, which supposedly belonged to Wallace, although some parts were made at least 160 years later, was held for many years in Dumbarton Castle and is now in the Wallace Monument.

== In popular culture ==
=== Film ===
- A popular depiction of Wallace's life is presented in the film Braveheart (1995), directed by and starring Mel Gibson as Wallace, written by Randall Wallace, and filmed in Scotland and Ireland. The film was criticised for many historical inaccuracies.
- In the film Outlaw King (2018), Robert the Bruce (Chris Pine) is prompted to plan a revolt against the English after observing rioting induced by the public display of the quartered body of Wallace. A prior scene featuring a withered Wallace conferring with Bruce was cut from the film after an initial screening at TIFF.

=== Literature ===
- Blind Harry's 15th-century poem has been a major influence on the legend of Wallace, including details like a wife named Marion Braidfute, and claiming that Wallace killed the Sheriff of Lanark in revenge for the killing of his wife. However much of this poem is unsubstantiated, at variance with contemporary sources, or disputed by historians.
- In 1793, Robert Burns wrote the lyrics to Scots Wha Hae wi Wallace bled.
- Jane Porter penned a romantic version of the Wallace legend in the historical novel The Scottish Chiefs (1810).
- In her prize-winning poem of 1819, Wallace's Invocation to Bruce, Felicia Hemans imagines Wallace urging Bruce to continue the struggle for freedom after defeat at the Battle of Falkirk.
- In 1828, Walter Scott wrote of "The Story of Sir William Wallace" in his Tales of a Grandfather (first series).
- G. A. Henty wrote a novel about this time period titled In Freedom's Cause: A Story of Wallace and Bruce (1885). Henty, a producer of and writer for the Boy's Own Paper story paper, portrays the life of William Wallace, Robert the Bruce, The Black Douglas and others, while dovetailing the events of his novel with historical fiction.
- Nigel Tranter wrote a historical novel titled The Wallace (1975), "admirably free of anything to do with Braveheart".
- The Temple and the Stone (1998), a novel by Katherine Kurtz and Deborah Turner Harris, includes a storyline creating a fictional connection between Wallace and Templar Knights.

=== Gaming ===
- Wallace is the subject and protagonist of the tutorial campaign in realtime strategy game Age of Empires II.

=== Beer ===
- A number of beers are named for Wallace. A brewery in Bridge of Allan, Scotland, makes a Scottish ale named "William Wallace", and Scottish Maclays Brewery had a beer called "Wallace".

== See also ==
- Auchenbathie Tower – Wallace's Knowe
- Clan Wallace
- Wallace's Heel Well – an imprint of Wallace's heel in stone
- Wallace's Well – Robroyston, Glasgow
- List of people hanged, drawn and quartered

== Bibliography ==
- Barrow, G.W.S. (2005) [1989]. Kingship and Unity: Scotland 1000–1306. The New History of Scotland. Vol. 2 (4th ed.). Edinburgh: Edinburgh University Press. ISBN 978-0-7486-2022-7.
- Barrow, G.W.S. (1976), Robert Bruce and the Community of the Realm of Scotland (2nd ed.), Edinburgh: Edinburgh University Press, ISBN 978-0-85224-307-7
- Barrow, G.W.S. (2003), The Kingdom of the Scots: Government, Church and Society from the eleventh to the fourteenth century (2nd ed.), Edinburgh: Edinburgh University Press, ISBN 978-0-7486-1803-3
- Brown, Chris (2005), William Wallace. The True Story of Braveheart, Stroud: Tempus Publishing Ltd, ISBN 978-0-7524-3432-2
- Brown, Michael (2004), The Wars of Scotland 1214–1371, The New Edinburgh History of Scotland, vol. 4, Edinburgh: Edinburgh University Press, ISBN 978-0-7486-1238-3
- Clater-Roszak, Christine (1997). "Sir William Wallace ignited a flame". Military History. 14: 12–15.
- Cowan, Edward J. (2003), 'For Freedom Alone': The Declaration of Arbroath, 1320, West Linton: Tuckwell Press, ISBN 978-1-84158-632-8
- Cowan, Edward J.; Finlay, Richard J., eds. (2002), Scottish History: The Power of the Past, Edinburgh: Edinburgh University Press, ISBN 978-0-7486-1420-2
- Cowan, Edward J., ed. (2007), The Wallace Book, Edinburgh: John Donald, ISBN 978-0-85976-652-4
- Cowan, Edward J. (2007), "William Wallace: 'The Choice of the Estates'", in Cowan, Edward J. (ed.), The Wallace Book, Edinburgh: John Donald, pp. 9–25, ISBN 978-0-85976-652-4
- Duncan, A.A.M. (2007), "William, Son of Alan Wallace: The Documents", in Cowan, Edward J. (ed.), The Wallace Book, Edinburgh: John Donald, pp. 42–63, ISBN 978-0-85976-652-4
- Fisher, Andrew (2002), William Wallace (2nd ed.), Edinburgh: Birlinn, ISBN 978-1-84158-593-2
- Fraser, James E. (2002), "'A Swan from a Raven': William Wallace, Brucean Propaganda and Gesta Annalia II", The Scottish Historical Review, LXXXI (1), Edinburgh: Edinburgh University Press: 1–22, doi:10.3366/shr.2002.81.1.1, hdl:20.500.11820/e9d658e4-8652-4841-ab0a-f1c842e3af91, ISSN 0036-9241
- Grant, Alexander (2007), "Bravehearts and Coronets: Images of William Wallace and the Scottish Nobility", in Cowan, Edward J. (ed.), The Wallace Book, Edinburgh: John Donald, pp. 86–106, ISBN 978-0-85976-652-4
- King, Elspeth (2007), "The Material Culture of William Wallace", in Cowan, Edward J. (ed.), The Wallace Book, Edinburgh: John Donald, pp. 117–135, ISBN 978-0-85976-652-4
- Mackay, James (2012), William Wallace: Brave Heart, Edinburgh: Mainstream Publishing, ISBN 978-1-85158-823-7
- H. Maxwell, ed. (1913). The Chronicle of Lanercost 1272–1346.
- Prestwich, Michael (2007), "The Battle of Stirling Bridge: An English Perspective", in Cowan, Edward J. (ed.), The Wallace Book, Edinburgh: John Donald, pp. 64–76, ISBN 978-0-85976-652-4
- Morton, Graeme (2004). William Wallace. London: Sutton. ISBN 978-0-7509-3523-4.
- Folklore, Myths and Legends of Britain. London: Reader's Digest Association. 1973. pp. 519–520.
- Reese, Peter (1998). William Wallace: A Biography. Edinburgh: Canongate. ISBN 978-0-86241-607-2.
- Riddy, Felicity (2007). Cowan, Edward J. (ed.). "Unmapping the Territory: Blind Hary's Wallace". The Wallace Book. Edinburgh: John Donald: 107–116. ISBN 978-0-85976-652-4.
- Scott, Ronald McNair (1989). Robert the Bruce. New York: Peter Bedrick Books. ISBN 978-0-87226-320-8.
- Scott, Sir Walter. Exploits and death of William Wallace, the 'Hero of Scotland'
- Stead, Michael J.; Young, Alan (2002). In the Footsteps of William Wallace. London: Sutton.
- Stevenson, Joseph, ed. (1841). 'Documents Illustrative of Sir William Wallace. Maitland Club.
- Traquair, Peter (1998), Freedom's Sword, University of Virginia: Roberts Rinehart Publishers, ISBN 978-1-57098-247-7
- Watson, Fiona (2007). Cowan, Edward J. (ed.). "Sir William Wallace: What We Do – and Don't – Know". The Wallace Book. Edinburgh: John Donald: 26–41. ISBN 978-0-85976-652-4.
