= Eóin Mac Suibhne =

- Eóin's name as it appears on page 264 of National Library of Scotland Advocates MS 72.1.37 (the Book of the Dean of Lismore): "One m'soyne".
- Noble family: Clann Suibhne
- Father: Suibhne Mac Suibhne

Eóin Mac Suibhne (fl. 1310) was a fourteenth-century Scottish nobleman and a leading member of Clann Suibhne. (Note: Since the 1980s, academics have accorded Eóin various patronyms in English secondary sources: Eógan Mac Suibhne, Eogan Mac Suibne, Eoghan Mac Suibhne, Eoin Mac Suibhne, Eóin Mac Suibhne, Eoin mac Suibhne, Eoin Mac Suibne, Eoin MacSuibhne, Eoin MacSween, Eòin MacSween, John Mac Sween, John MacSuibhne, John Macsween, John MacSween, and John McQueen.) In the middle of the thirteenth century, seemingly during the 1260s, Eóin's family appears to have been ejected from its homeland in Argyll by the Stewart/Menteith kindred. It may have been during this period that members of Clann Suibhne took up residence in Ireland.

In the first decade of the fourteenth century, Eóin appears on record claiming his family's Scottish lands. As such, Eóin campaigned on behalf of the English cause during the First War of Scottish Independence as a means of combating the Stewarts/Menteiths. An expedition by Eóin to reclaim his ancestral lordship may be referred to by a particular piece of mediaeval Gaelic poetry. Although a sixteenth-century source alleges that Eóin was the first Clann Suibhne Lord of Fanad, contemporary sources appear to show that the family gained the lordship later in the fourteenth century.

== Background ==
Simplified pedigree of the Clann Suibhne illustrating Eóin's place in the kindred.

Suibhne
Dubhghall | Maol Mhuire
Murchadh | Donn Sléibhe
Maol Mhuire an Sparáin
Suibhne | Murchadh Mear
Eóin | Toirdhealbhach | Murchadh | Murchadh Óg | Maol Mhuire

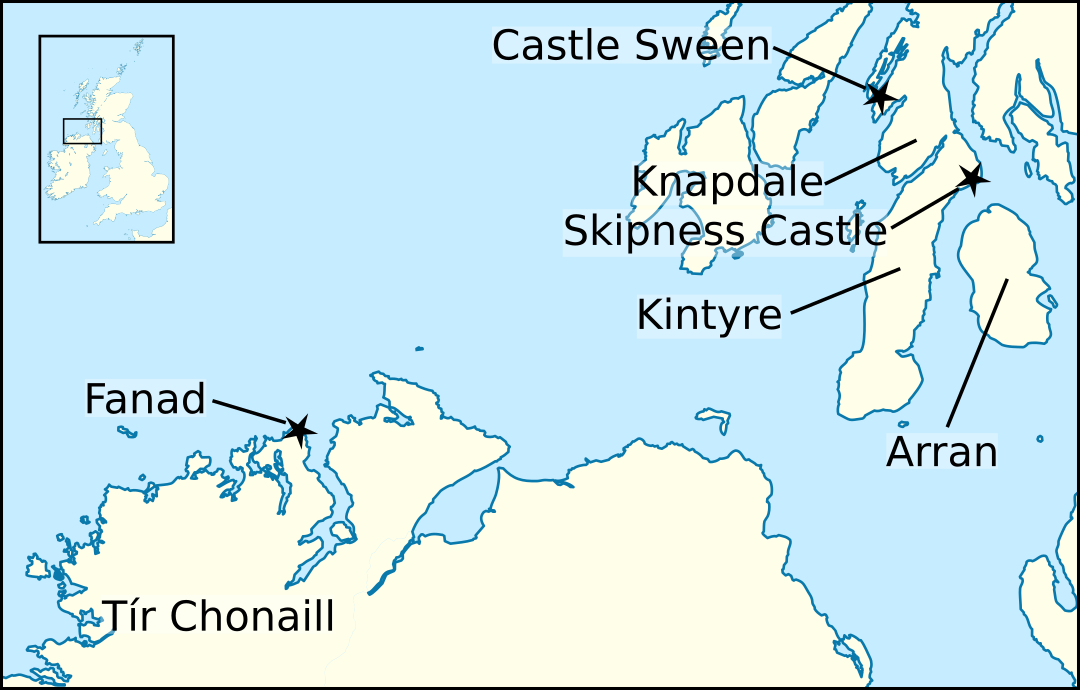
Locations relating to Eóin's life and times.

Eóin was a member of Clann Suibhne, a family descended from the eponymous Suibhne mac Duinn Shléibhe. Eóin's father was Suibhne, son of Maol Mhuire an Sparáin. The latter was a son of Murchadh Mac Suibhne, grandson of Suibhne mac Duinn Shléibhe. (Note: According to the sixteenth-century Leabhar Clainne Suibhne, Murchadh Mac Suibhne bore the epithet Mear ("the mad"). If this source is to be believed, his father bore the epithet an Sparáin ("the purse"), and was married to Bean Mhídhe, daughter of Toirdhealbhach Ó Conchobhair. There is reason to suspect that these claims are nevertheless erroneous. The earliest source to outline Clann Suibhne's descent is the fourteenth-century Book of Ballymote, which appears to show that Leabhar Clainne Suibhne has omitted two generations, merging Murchadh Mac Suibhne and his father with a like-named son and grandson. Various Irish annals, such as the fifteenth- to sixteenth-century Annals of Connacht, record that a member of Clann Suibhne named Maol Mhuire was married to Bean Mhídhe, daughter of Toirdhealbhach, son of Ruaidhrí Ó Conchobhair, King of Connacht. The fact that this source specifically identifies Bean Mhídhe as "the wife" of her husband, in an annal entry outlining her death in 1269, suggests that her husband was still alive at the time. This in turn suggests that the annal entry refers to the wife of Murchadh Mac Suibhne's son; and that the epithets an Sparáin and Mear are those of Murchadh Mac Suibhne's son and grandson.)

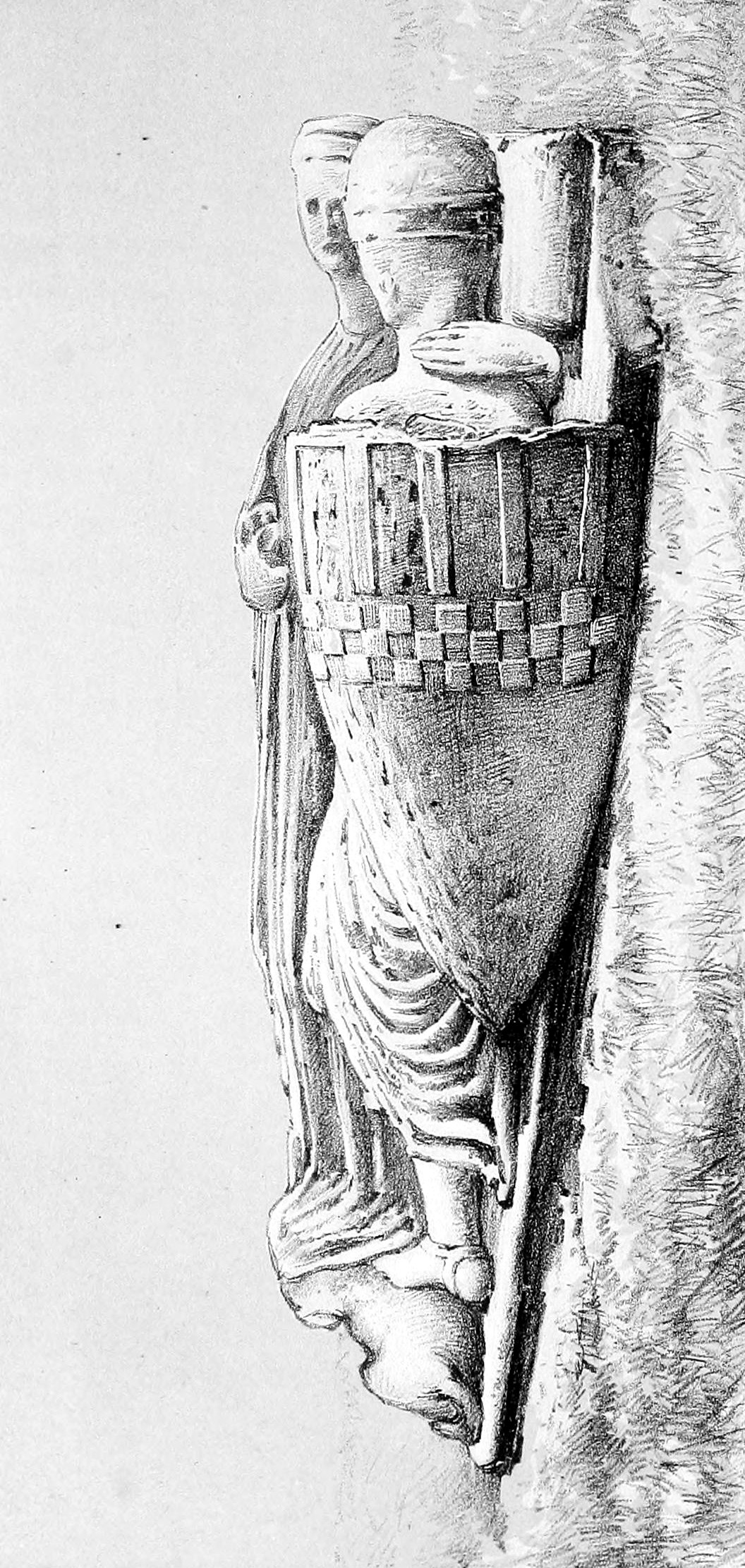
The effigy of Walter Stewart, Earl of Menteith and his wife, Mary I, Countess of Menteith.

At some point in the mid thirteenth century—perhaps in the 1260s—Eóin's family appears to have been ejected from its homeland in Argyll. At about this point, the clan seems to have been displaced and replaced in the region by the Stewart/Menteith kindred. As such, it may have been at about this time that Clann Suibhne took up residence in Ireland, and it may have been during this period that the family began to act as suppliers of gallowglass warriors there. Eóin's great-grandfather, Murchadh Mac Suibhne, is certainly reported to have perished in Ireland, as the prisoner of the Earl of Ulster, in 1267. (Note: The record of Murchadh Mac Suibhne's demise is the first notice of Clann Suibhne by the Irish annals.)

As late as 1261, an earlier member of the clan, a certain Dubhghall mac Suibhne, is reported to have been the lord of Skipness Castle and its adjacent chapel. That year, according to a charter witnessed by Walter Stewart, Earl of Menteith, Dubhghall granted away some of his territory to Paisley Abbey. The following year, Dubhghall is said to have signed over Skipness, and lands in Knapdale, Kintyre, and Cowal. (Note: Walter was the first member of Stewart family to adopt a form of the surname Stewart despite not possessing the office of steward. He married a member of the comital kindred of Menteith, and was afterwards granted the earldom by Alexander III, King of Scotland. Walter appears to have been responsible for the major remodelling of Skipness Castle before the end of the thirteenth century.)

The circumstances surrounding of Dubhghall's contract with Walter are unclear. There are no other records regarding the allotment of Clann Suibhne lands during this period, and it is not known if the Stewarts/Menteiths or their allies had already established themselves in Knapdale. One possibility is that Dubhghall and his family succumbed to a military campaign against them. The creation of the Stewart/Menteith lordship of Knapdale may have been undertaken in the context of extending Scottish royal authority into Argyll and the Isles. This transition of power certainly seems to have marked an increase in Scottish authority in Argyll. In any case, the continued Stewart/Menteith lordship of Knapdale is evidenced by Walter's grant of churches in Knapdale to Kilwinning Abbey, and by an act of parliament that notes the earl's land of Knapdale in 1293. Regardless, ensuing historical events reveal that later members of Clann Suibhne regarded this territorial arrangement as unacceptable.

== Campaigning for the English in 1310 ==
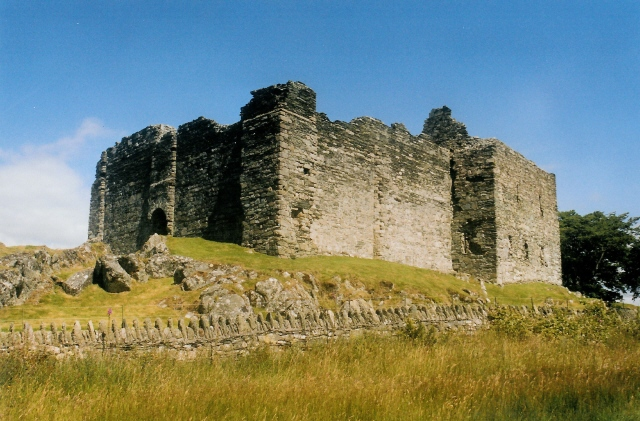
Ruinous Castle Sween, a stronghold seemingly built by Suibhne, eponym of both Clann Suibhne and the castle itself.

Eóin appears to be the subject of a remarkable piece of Gaelic poetry called Dál chabhlaigh ar Chaistéal Suibhne ("An assembling of a fleet against Castle Sween"). The poem was authored by Artúr Dall Mac Gurcaigh, and possibly composed for Eóin himself. (Note: The poem is sometime merely known as the MacSween poem, or the Tryst against Castle Sween. The composition is preserved by the sixteenth-century Book of the Dean of Lismore, the most important manuscript of mediaeval Gaelic poetry in Scotland.) Artúr's poem purports to describe a seaborne invasion of Castle Sween and surrounding Knapdale from Ireland. Whilst it is possible that the poem refers to an actual attack upon the ancestral Clann Suibhne seat, it is also possible that the composition merely depicts an idealised and exaggerated expedition that was never undertaken. In fact, there is reason to suspect that the poem was composed not for Eóin, but for a fourteenth-century member of the kindred, Eóghan, brother of Toirdhealbhach Caoch Mac Suibhne, Lord of Fanad. As such, Dál chabhlaigh ar Chaistéal Suibhne may instead concern a proposed expedition by Eóghan to reclaim his family's ancestral Scottish heritage. (Note: Castle Sween is one of Scotland's oldest standing stone castles. It appears to have been constructed at some point in the late twelfth century by Suibhne. This man was the progenitor of Clann Suibhne, and eponym of the castle itself. Certainly, Leabhar Clainne Suibhne claims that Suibhne was the castle's constructor.)

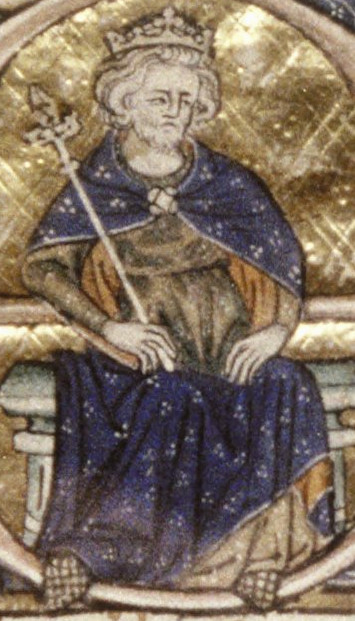
A fourteenth-century illumination of Edward II on folio 105r of Oxford Bodleian Library Rawlinson C 292.

Historically, in February 1306, Robert Bruce VII, Earl of Carrick, a claimant to the Scottish throne, murdered his chief rival to the kingship, John Comyn of Badenoch. Although the former seized the throne (as Robert I) by March, the English Crown immediately struck back, defeating his forces in June. By September, Robert was a fugitive, and seems to have escaped into the Hebrides. In 1307, at about the time of the death of Edward I, King of England in July, Robert mounted a remarkable return to power. By 1309, his opponents had been largely overcome, and he held his first parliament as king.

In 1310, King Edward II of England orchestrated an expedition into Scotland. One component of the campaign was a maritime force launched from Ireland under the command of Richard de Burgh, Earl of Ulster. One possibility is that Richard was meant to support the forces of the English-aligned Clann Dubhghaill in Argyll. It may well have been in the context of bolstering the campaign that the English Crown reached out to Eóin and other neighbouring maritime magnates.

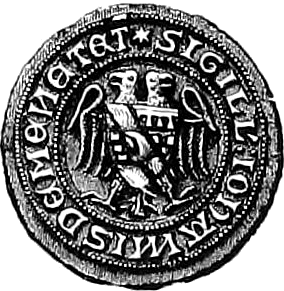
The seal of John Menteith. Eóin's pursuance of his ancestral claim to Knapdale meant that he was John's greatest enemy.

Specifically, in July 1310, correspondence between Eóin and Edward II reveals that the English king granted Eóin—and Eóin's brothers Toirdhealbhach and Murchadh—the land of Knapdale which formerly belonged to their ancestors, as a means to continue to combat Walter's son, John Menteith, an adherent of the Scottish Crown. Clearly, the Stewart/Menteith opposition to Edward II was the catalyst for Eóin's support of the English. Clann Suibhne's alignment with the English, therefore, exemplifies how bitter long-standing local rivalries dictated the adherence or opposition to the Bruce cause. (Note: The fact that Eóin and his brothers sought to retake the former Clann Suibhne territories could indicate that their father, Suibhne, was eldest of Maol Mhuire an Sparáin's sons: Suibhne and Murchadh Mear. Later Irish lines of Clann Suibhne descended from two sons of Murchadh Mear: Murchadh Óg and Maol Mhuire. Another figure active in the region was a certain Malcolm le fitz l'Engleys. The familial affiliation of this man is uncertain. He appears in surviving sources with names meaning both "son of the Englishman" and "the Englishman". The fact that he furthered a claim to lands in Kintyre could be evidence that he was a member of Clann Suibhne or related to the family.) Further correspondence likewise evinces this royal grant to Eóin, and reveals that he was in the company of Aonghus Óg Mac Domhnaill and Hugh Bisset whilst on campaign against John. (Note: Like Clann Suibhne, the Bisset kindred seems to have lost territories to the Stewarts/Menteiths in the thirteenth century, specifically the island of Arran off Kintyre.) Eóin's letter to the king specifies that, although he was able to visit Knapdale and view it, he was unable to gain possession of it on account of the occupying forces of Eóin Mac Dubhghaill. (Note: Ostensibly, Eóin, Eóin Mac Dubhghaill, and John, were all supporters of the English Crown during this period. However, the latter was present at Robert's parliament of 1309, and it is possible that this Clann Dubhghaill occupation of Knapdale prompted John to switch his allegiance to the Bruce cause.) In any case, in early August, within weeks of Richard's intended maritime campaign, Edward II redirected the fleet to Mann, and placed it under the command of Simon de Montagu.

If Dál chabhlaigh ar Chaistéal Suibhne indeed refers to a specific event, it is conceivable that this event took place at about the time of Edward II's grant to Eóin. Whatever the case, Clann Suibhne was apparently unable to make good of the king's grant, and never regained possession of Knapdale. The fact that th earl's maritime campaign never materialised as intended may account for Eóin's inability to secure his ancestral lands. In consequence of this failure, Eóin appears to have thereafter served in Ireland, where members of Clann Suibhne later served as military commanders. If the largely legendary sixteenth-century Leabhar Clainne Suibhne is to be believed, Eóin was banished from Scotland having killed a man, after which Eóin relocated to Ireland, and overcame the Uí Bresléin to become the first in a long line of Clann Suibhne lords of Fanad. However, there is reason to suspect that this account is erroneous. For example, this supposed massacre of the Uí Bresléin is not documented by any of the Irish annals. In fact, the Uí Bresléin were earlier dispossessed by the Uí Domhnaill, and the fifteenth- to sixteenth-century Annals of Ulster notes the death of the Uí Domhnaill Lord of Fanad in 1281. Also, Leabhar Clainne Suibhne notes that certain territories within Fanad were granted to Clann Suibhne by the Uí Domhnaill later in the fourteenth century, which suggests that Clann Suibhne was not then in possession of the lordship. In fact, the first recorded Clann Suibhne Lord of Fanad is Toirdhealbhach Caoch.

== Final loss of the Clann Suibhne patrimony ==
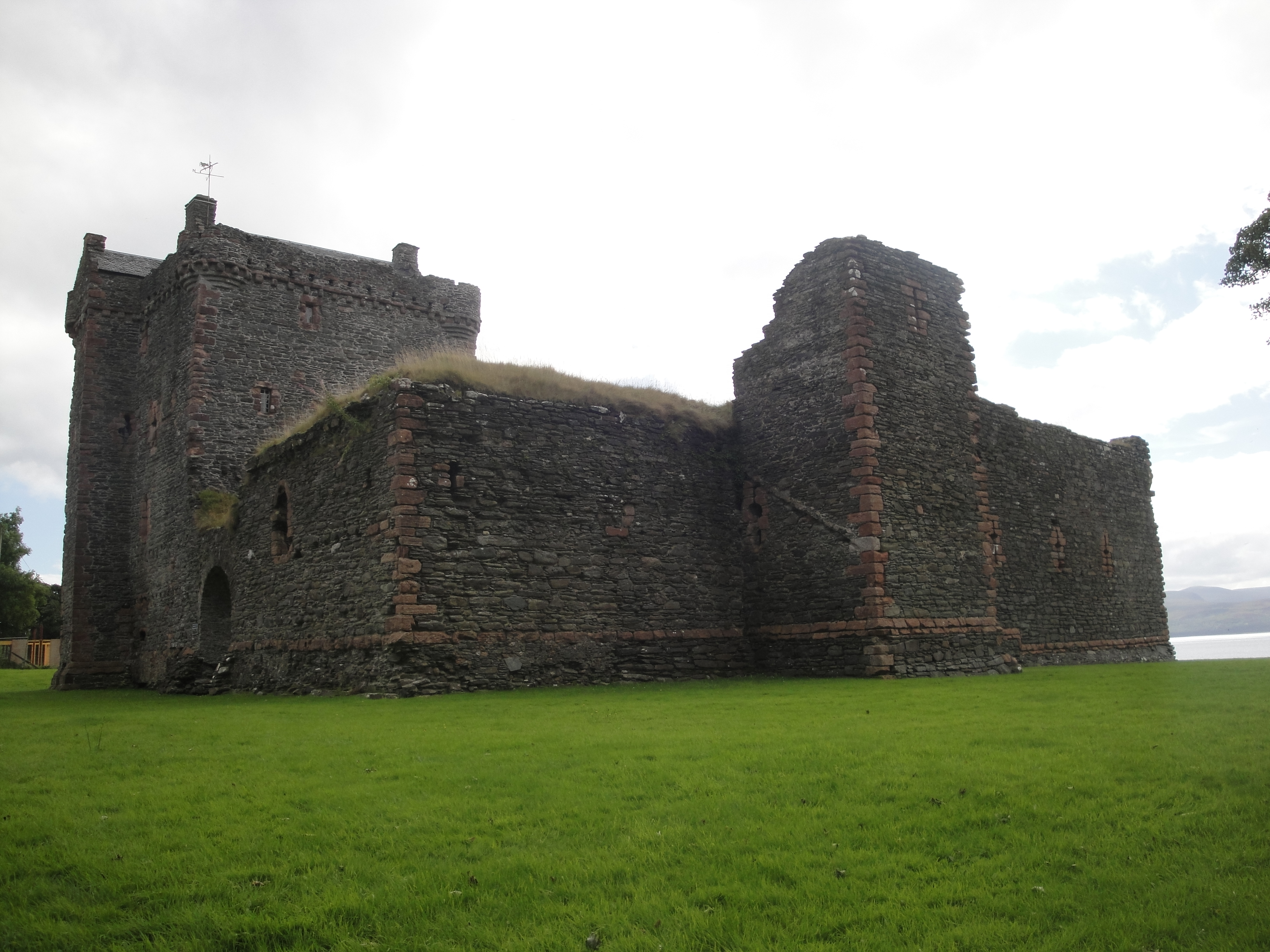
Ruinous Skipness Castle was a Clann Suibhne stronghold until the thirteenth century. As late as 1261, it was held by Eóin's predecessor, Dubhghall mac Suibhne, a man who may have built the castle.

In 1314, Edward II granted one of his Scottish retainers, a certain Dungal de Gyvelestone, the lands of Knapdale and Glendaruel. In this grant, these territories are stated to have been in the hands of John, and to have been earlier possessed by a certain "Suny Magurke"—presumably at some point in the late thirteenth century. On one hand, Suny's recorded name could indicate that he was the son of a man named Murchadh—perhaps a son of Murchadh Mac Suibhne who died in 1267, or a son of the like-named brother of Eóin noted in 1310. On the other hand, it is possible that Suny is identical to Eóin's father, and that his recorded name equates to Suibhne Mag Bhuirrche. (Note: Eoin's father is otherwise attested by Leabhar Clainne Suibhne. The sixteenth-century Leabhar Cloinne Aodha Buidhe dubiously claims that the first gallowglasses introduced into Ireland were those employed by Domhnall Ó Néill, King of Tír Eoghain, and were commanded by a certain Mag Buirrche. Although this source is suspect, a certain Mac Buirrche, and the heir of Clann Suibhne, are reported by various Irish annals to have fallen in battle supporting the cause of Pilib Ó Raghallaigh, with one hundred and forty gallowglasses, in 1305.)

Following Robert's consolidation of authority in Scotland, the lands of English adherents were forfeited and redistributed to close supporters of the Bruce cause. As such, the vast Clann Dubhghaill maritime territories were broken up and granted away to various kindreds. As for the former Clann Suibhne lordship of Knapdale, Robert apparently granted it to John. The latter's like-named grandson was certainly styled "Lord of Knapdale and Arran" in 1357, and is recorded to have granted various lands in the lordship—including Castle Sween—to Giolla Easbuig Caimbéal, Lord of Loch Awe.

== Clann Suibhne connections with the Uí Domhnaill ==
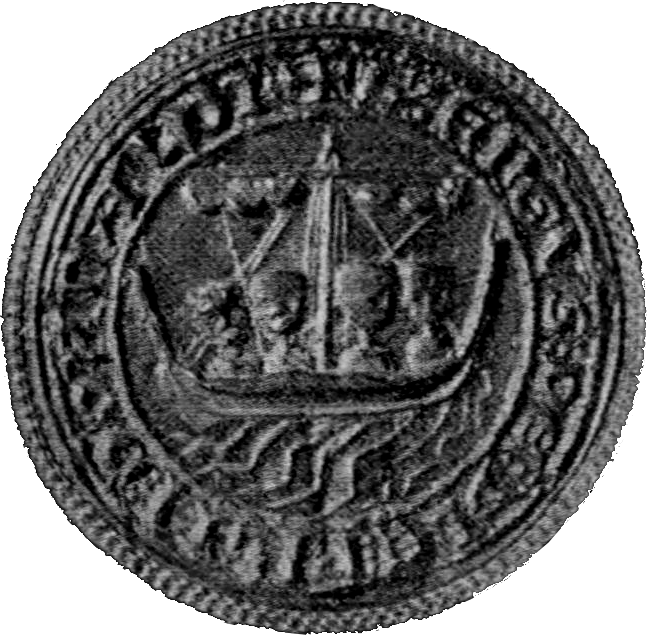
The seal of Aonghus Mór mac Domhnaill. Clann Suibhne and Clann Domhnaill backed opposing sides in a succession dispute amongst the Uí Domhnaill of Tír Chonaill.

Domhnall Óg Ó Domhnaill, King of Tír Chonaill was evidently allied in marriage with Clann Suibhne. According to the sixteenth-century pedigrees of the Uí Domhnaill, a daughter of a certain Mac Suibhne was the mother of Domhnall Óg's son and successor, Aodh. In fact, Domhnall Óg was himself fostered amongst Clann Suibhne, as evidenced by a contemporary poem composed by Giolla Brighde Mac Con Midhe. (Note: It was partly the military might of Domhnall Óg's foster-father that enabled Domhnall Óg to succeed his brother at the age of seventeen.) Aodh was first inaugurated as king in 1281. The fact that his mother is unlikely to have been born much later than 1250 suggests that she was not a daughter of Eóin. Nevertheless, Leabhar Clainne Suibhne claims that Eóin, by way of a daughter named Caiteríona, was indeed Aodh's maternal grandfather.

In September 1286, members of the faction concluded a pact, known as the Turnberry Band, in which certain Scottish and Anglo-Irish magnates pledged to support one another. Three of the cosignatories were members of the Stewart/Menteith kindred: Walter, and his two sons, Alexander and John. The participation of these men in the band could have also concerned their family's part in the annexation of the Clann Suibhne lordship in Argyll. Forced from its homeland, Clann Suibhne evidently found a safe haven in Tír Chonaill on account of its marital alliance with Domhnall Óg. Another cosignatory was Richard, son of the man in whose prison Murchadh Mac Suibhne died in 1267. As such, it is conceivable that the Stewart/Menteith aspect of the band concerned the continued threat that the family faced from Clann Suibhne, now seemingly seated in Tír Chonaill, and backed by Aodh. Likewise, the part played by the Earl of Ulster in Murchadh Mac Suibhne's demise could be evidence that this comital family of de Burgh was opposed to the settlement of Clann Suibhne in Ireland, and therefore aligned with the Stewarts/Menteiths in regard to the fate of Clann Suibhne.

Tall men are arraying the fleet
which takes its course on the swift sea-surface;
every hand holds a trim warspear
in the battle of targes, polished and comely.

The prows of the ships are arrayed
with quilted hauberks as with jewels,
with warriors wearing brown belts;
Norsemen — nobles at that.

— excerpt from Dál chabhlaigh ar Chaistéal Suibhne, by Artúr Dall Mac Gurcaigh, describing a Clann Suibhne war-fleet to Castle Sween. Ships were the most valuable pieces of military technology utilised by the suppliers of gallowglass troops.

Two other cosignatories were Aonghus Mór mac Domhnaill, Lord of Islay, and his succeeding son, Alasdair Óg, leading members of Clann Domhnaill. It is evident that a daughter of Aonghus Mór was married to Domhnall Óg, and that this woman was the mother of Domhnall Óg's son, Toirdhealbhach. As such, the participation of Aonghus Mór and Alasdair Óg in the band could well have concerned an attempt to install Toirdhealbhach—matrilineally descended from Clann Domhnaill—as King of Tír Chonaill over the competing claims of this man's opposing half-brother, Aodh—matrilineally descended from Clann Suibhne. Certainly, in 1290, the fifteenth- to sixteenth-century Annals of Connacht, the sixteenth-century Annals of Loch Cé, the seventeenth-century Annals of the Four Masters, and the Annals of Ulster report that Aodh was defeated at the hands of his half-brother, who thereby seized the kingship of Tír Chonaill through the power of Clann Domhnaill. Whether this clash was a direct result of the bond is uncertain, although it seems likely that Aonghus Mór's part in the pact concerned the value of his kindred's military might. (Note: This notice of Clann Domhnaill's part in Aodh's defeat to Toirdhealbhach is the first specific record of the term "gallowglass" (gallóglach). Although the Gaelic term gallóglach can be translated as "foreign warrior", it more likely means "warrior from Innse Gall", in reference to overseas warrors from the Hebrides.) When Toirdhealbhach was defeated again in 1295, the Annals of the Four Masters reports that he was forced from Tír Chonaill, and found sanctuary with Cineál Eoghain and Clann Domhnaill. Contentions between the half-brothers and their allies continued until Toirdhealbhach's defeat and death at the hands of Aodh in 1303. The Clann Suibhne gallowglasses that lent support to Aodh's cause may well have been commanded by Eóin, and it may have been from Tír Chonaill, with Aodh's backing, where Clann Suibhne launched its campaigns against the Stewarts/Menteiths. The history of Clann Suibhne in the thirteenth- and fourteenth centuries reveals not only the remarkable military power at the disposal of its leadership, but also the ability of these leaders to maintain cohesion without a fixed territorial base.

== Ancestry ==
Ancestors of Eóin Mac Suibhne

16. Maol Mhuire mac Suibhne
8. Murchadh Mac Suibhne (died 1267)
4. Maol Mhuire an Sparáin Mac Suibhne
2. Suibhne Mac Suibhne
20. Ruaidhrí Ó Conchobhair (died 1198)
10. Toirdhealbhach Ó Conchobhair (died 1239)
5. Bean Mhídhe Ní Conchobhair (died 1269)
1. Eóin Mac Suibhne
