= Dubhghall mac Suibhne =

13th-century Scottish landholder

- Noble family: Clann Suibhne
- Spouses: Juliana; Johanna
- Father: Suibhne mac Duinn Shléibhe

Dubhghall mac Suibhne (fl. 1232×1241 – 1262) was a Scottish landholder in Argyll, and a leading member of Clann Suibhne. (Note: Since the 1980s, academics have accorded Dubhghall various personal names in English secondary sources: Dougal, Dougall, Dubhgall, Dubhghall, Dubhghall, Dugald, and Dugall. Since the 1980s, academics have accorded Dubhghall various patronyms names in English secondary sources: Dubhgall mac Suibhne, Dubhgall MacSween, Dubhghall mac Suibne, Dugald mac Suibhne, Dugald Mac Sween, Dugald MacSween, and Dugall MacSween.) He was a son of Suibhne mac Duinn Shléibhe, and appears to have held lordship of Knapdale from at least the 1240s to the 1260s, and may have initiated the construction of Skipness Castle and Lochranza Castle.

During Dubhghall's career, Clann Suibhne fell prey to the Stewarts, one of Scotland's most powerful families. By the 1240s, the Stewarts appear to have gained lordship in the Firth of Clyde and Cowal, whilst Alexander II, King of Scotland attempted to extend royal authority into Argyll and the Isles. It is in the context of this Scottish encroachment into Argyll that Dubhghall first appears on record, in an appeal to Pope Innocent IV for papal protection in 1247.

Although Alexander II's campaign to annex Argyll and the Isles came to an immediate halt on his death in 1249, his son and successor, Alexander III, renewed hostilities in the 1260s. By this time, it was Walter Stewart, Earl of Menteith who spearheaded the Stewarts' westward advance. Charter evidence dating to 1261 and 1262 reveals that Dubhghall resigned the Clann Suibhne lordship into Walter Stewart's hands. Whether this transfer was the result of a military operation against Clann Suibhne is unknown. The fact that some members of the kindred were unwilling to subject themselves to Stewart domination is evinced by the ensuing career of Dubhghall's nephew, Murchadh Mac Suibhne.

== Family ==
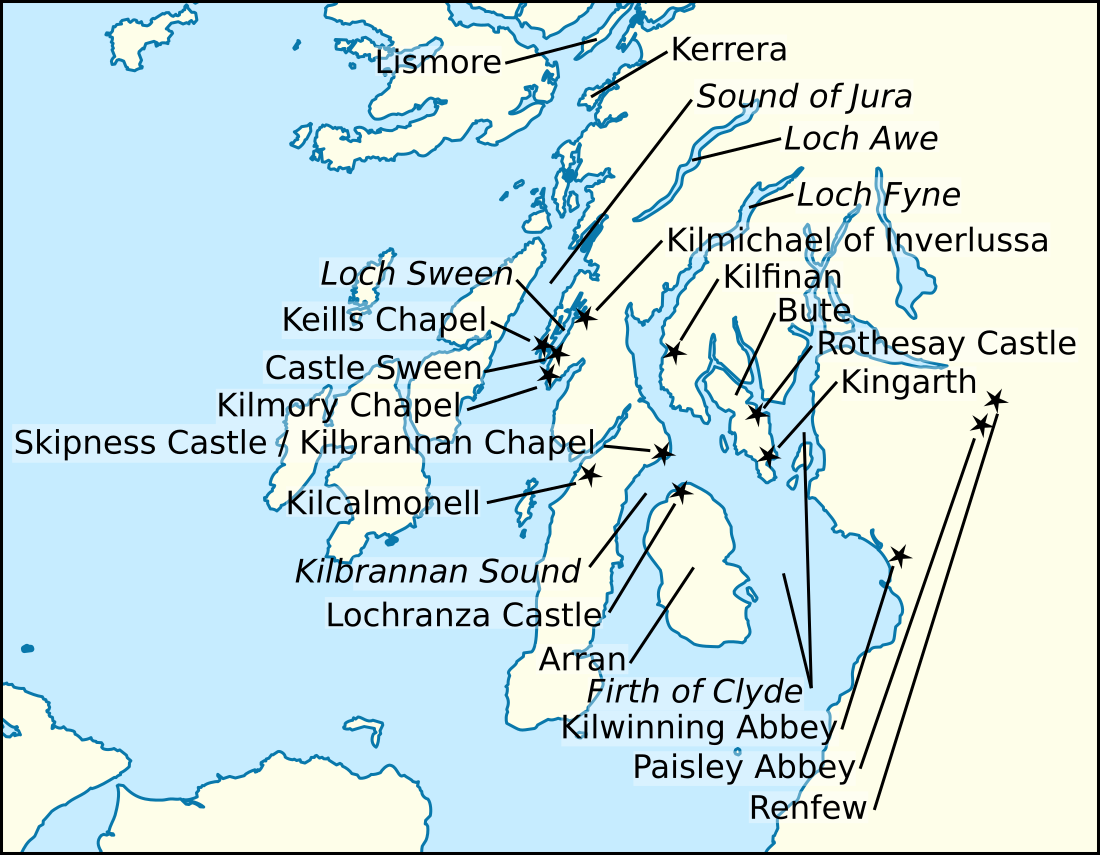
Locations relating to the life and times of Dubhghall.

Dubhghall was a son of Suibhne mac Duinn Shléibhe, eponymous ancestor of Clann Suibhne. According to the eighteenth-century Craignish History, a daughter of Dubhghall married a member of the Craignish branch of the Caimbéalaigh kindred (the Campbells). Dubhghall's son-in-law, a man also named Dubhghall, is identified by the Craignish History as the third of the name to represent the Craignish Caimbéalaigh. The succeeding son of this couple is further stated by this source to have been named Dubhghall, and is elsewhere attested as an historical landholder in Argyll. (Note: The Craignish Caimbéalaigh used the subsidiary surname MacDubhghaill (MacDougall). Although it is uncertain if the family were actual blood Caimbéalaigh, later generations of the Craignish family certainly regarded themselves as members of the clan. An alternate origin of the Craignish family is given by the seventeenth-century Ane Accompt of the Genealogie of the Campbells, which states that a daughter of Suibhne married Cailéan, an ancestor of the Caimbéalaigh. According to this source, Cailéan and Suibhne's daughter had a son, Giolla Easbuig, who in turn had several sons, one of which was Dubhghall, progenitor of the Craignish Caimbéalaigh.)

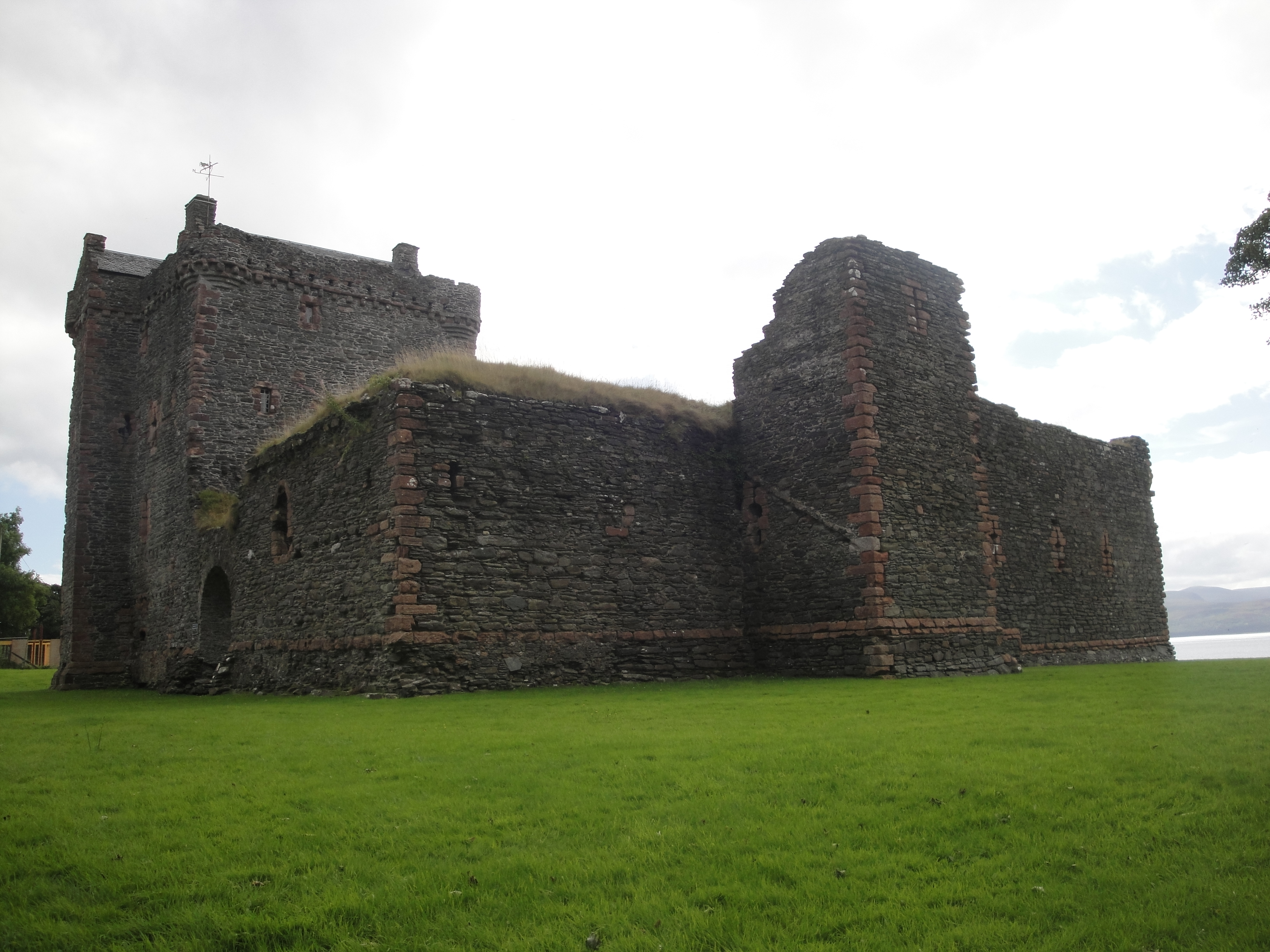
Now-ruinous Skipness Castle may have been constructed by Dubhghall. From this site, the castle's occupants would have had a clear view across the Kilbrannan Sound to Arran. The castle is first attested in 1261 by a charter which describes Dubhghall as its lord.

The Clann Suibhne lordship appears to have stretched across Knapdale, from the Sound of Jura to Loch Fyne, and further extended across the Kilbrannan Sound, from Skipness to Arran. (Note: The border between the lordships of Kintyre and Knapdale stretched across northern Kintyre peninsula.)

Dubhghall's father may have built Castle Sween in Knapdale. The fortress appears to date to the late twelfth century. As such, it is one of the oldest standing stone castles in Scotland. (Note: Suibhne is certainly claimed to be the castle's constructor by the sixteenth-century Leabhar Clainne Suibhne. According to Ane Accompt of the Genealogie of the Campbells, Suibhne owned the castle, and was "Thane of Knapdaill and Glassrie". Suibhne is not only the eponym of Castle Sween but also Loch Sween, the entrance to which the castle dominates. Whilst the oldest datable standing stone castles in Scotland appear to be Castle Sween and Aberdour Castle, the earliest stone castle may be Cubbie Roo's Castle, which seems to date to the mid twelfth century.)

Dubhghall's family appears to have constructed Skipness Castle as well. The original site seems to have consisted of two free-standing buildings: a two-storey residence with a lord's hall, and a single-storey chapel. This complex appears to have been surrounded by an earth and timber wall. The hall house and adjutant chapel may date to the first half of the thirteenth century. Skipness Castle is first recorded by a charter of Dubhghall dating to 1261. The site may have been a secondary residence to their main residence at Castle Sween, which could well have served as the power centre of the Clann Suibhne lordship.

In fact, it may have been Dubhghall who initiated construction of Skipness Castle. Clann Suibhne, and specifically Dubhghall himself, may have built Lochranza Castle on Arran as well. Although the visible ruins of the latter structure are those of a late mediaeval tower house, the original hall house appears to date to the thirteenth or fourteenth century. If the castle was indeed constructed by Clann Suibhe it would mean that the family possessed firm control over the Kilbrannan Sound.

== Scottish encroachment in Argyll ==
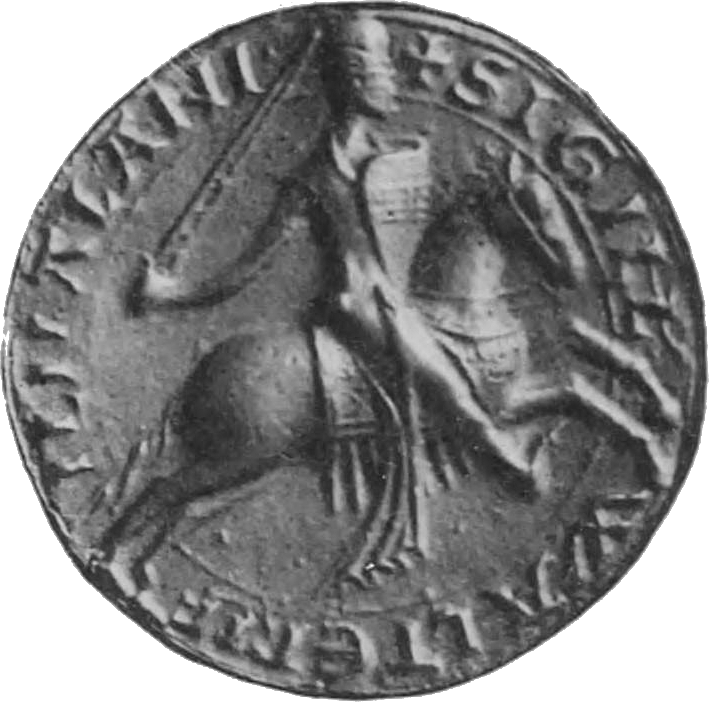
The seal of Walter fitz Alan II, Steward of Scotland, head of the powerful Stewart family.

One of the most powerful Scottish magnates of the reign of Alexander II, King of Scotland, was Walter fitz Alan II, Steward of Scotland, head of the Stewart kindred. The original power centre of Walter's familial ancestors was the lordship of Renfrew. By about 1200, during the career of Walter fitz Alan's father, Alan fitz Walter, Steward of Scotland, the Stewarts appear to have expanded into the Firth of Clyde and gained control of Bute. The family's authority over the island is specifically evidenced by a charter of Alan of the church of Kingarth and the entire parish on Bute to Paisley Abbey. The island's citadel, Rothesay Castle, may have been built by either Walter fitz Alan or his father in about 1200. As such, this Stewart fortress is contemporary to the Clann Suibhne stronghold Castle Sween. The westward expansion of Stewart power can be traced not only by the kindred's grants to Paisley Abbey—a religious house founded by the family's founder in the twelfth century—but also by grants to the abbey by native clans absorbed into the Stewart lordship. (Note: The extension of Stewart influence further west at about this time may also be evidenced by an undated grant of Raghnall mac Somhairle to the monastery of Paisley. In 1192, Raghnall is recorded to have been beaten in battle by his brother Aonghus, and there is reason to suspect that Raghnall's grant undertaken in the context of aligning himself with the steward in an effort to contend with Aonghus. As such, the Stewart acquisition of Bute may have been the result of kin-strife between these Clann Somhairle brothers.)

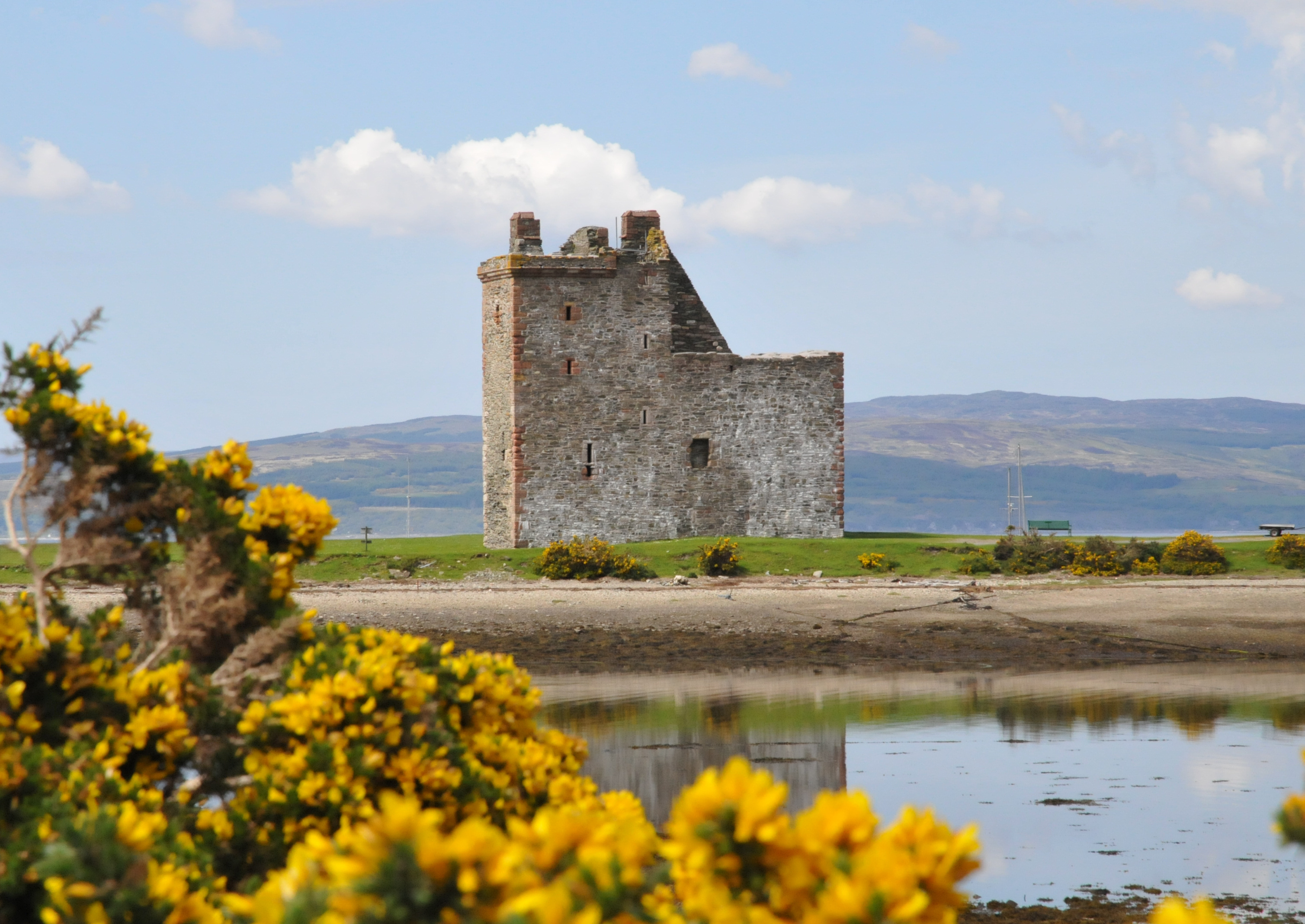
Now-ruinous Lochranza Castle may have been built by Dubhghall. The visible tower house is what remains of a late mediaeval redevelopment of a thirteenth-century hall house.

Whilst it is possible that Alan expanded into Cowal as well, another possibility is that it was during the tenure of Walter fitz Alan that the family received a grant of Cowal. Charter evidence reveals that by about the time of the latter's death in 1241, Cowal had been brought under Stewart overlordship, and Scottish royal authority was further expanding into Argyll. Specific early evidence of this encroachment is preserved by a grant of Laghmann mac Maoil Choluim of the church of St Finan (Kilfinan) to Paisley Abbey in 1232×1241. Laghmann was evidently a close kinsman of Dubhghall, and Dubhghall himself is recorded as one of witnesses of the transaction. (Note: Laghmann is the eponym of Clann Laghmainn. Laghmann's patrilineal grandfather appears to have been a brother of Suibhne. Another witness to the transaction was Giolla Phádraig mac Giolla Chríost, father of Lachlann Mór, eponymous ancestor of Clann Lachlainn. According to the Ó Cléirigh genealogical manuscript Royal Irish Academy 23 D 17, Giolla Phádraig's father was a brother of Suibhne, whereas the fifteenth-century National Library of Scotland Advocates' 72.1.1 (MS 1467) less-reliably identifies Giolla Phádraig's father as a brother of Suibhne's father, Donn Sléibhe. On 23 October 1269, certain grants of Aonghus Mór mac Domhnaill, Dubhghall himself, Donnchadh mac Fearchair, and (Donnchadh's nephew) Laghmann, are recorded to have been inspected by Lawrence, Bishop of Argyll. The inspected transactions concerned the churches of St Ciarán, St Colmán Ela (Kilcalmonell), and St Finan. Later grants, dating to the last half of the century, clearly reveal that the Stewarts were patrons of Laghmann's family, the principal native kindred of Cowal.)

In the 1230s, Alexander II interfered with the ecclesiastical affairs of Argyll. In 1236—presumably as a result of royal petition—the pope instructed the Bishop of Moray to secure a canonical election to select a new Bishop of Argyll, and by 1239 a Moravian dignitary named William served as Bishop of Argyll. After the drowning of this ecclesiast, authority over the see was given to Clement, Bishop of Dunblane. (Note: A charter evidencing Clement's authority in Argyll is one of Giolla Chríost Mac Neachtain of the church of St Muiredach (Kilmorich) to Inchaffray Abbey. Giolla Chríost is one of the earliest members of the Clann Mhic Neachtain on record.) By 1248, the bishop—possibly at the behest of the king—seems to have sought to move the cathedral from Lismore onto the mainland. (Note: A papal mandate, dating to 2 January 1248/1249, states that the diocesan cathedral should be removed from its island to "some more secure and accessible place". This directive may have partly stemmed from the previous bishop's drowning.) Further extension of royal authority is evidenced by the king's grant of a swathe of territory around Loch Awe and Loch Fyne to Giolla Easbuig Mac Giolla Chríost. (Note: The charter stipulates that Giolla Easbuig Mac Giolla Chríost owed his grant for the service of half a knight in the king's army, one knight in aid, as well as "Scottish service as the barons and knights on the north side of the Sea of Scotland do it for their lands".) This grant dates to 1 August 1240, and is the earliest infeftment of knight' service in the west Highlands.

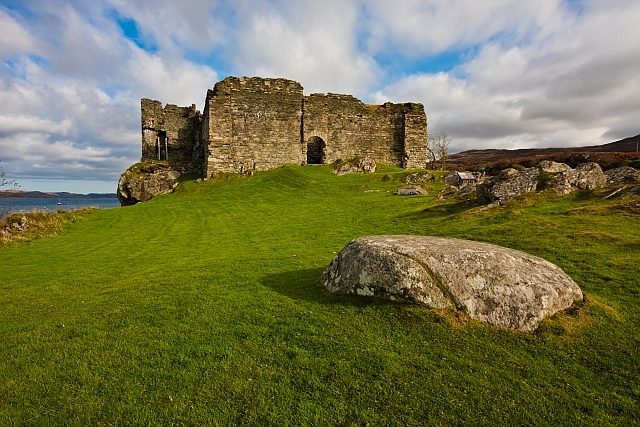
Ruinous Castle Sween, one of Scotland's oldest standing stone castles, seems to have been built by Dubhghall's father, eponym of both Clann Suibhne and the castle itself.

In 1244, Alexander II attempted to purchase the Isles from the Norwegian Crown. The westward extension of Scottish royal authority may account for the records of Dubhghall and the monks of Iona requesting papal protection. For example, on 17 April 1247, Pope Innocent IV granted protection to Dubhghall and his possessions. Days later, on 22 April 1247, the pope moved to preserve the independence of the Islesmen by ordering the abbots of the order of St Benedict in Scotland—on behalf of the abbot and convent of Iona—not to compel the latter to come to the Benedictine general chapter. On the same day of this command, the pope also granted the Abbot of Iona the use of the ring and mitre to further ensure his ecclesiastical freedom. Earlier, on 20 March 1247, the pope confirmed a grant by Dubhghall to the church of St Colmán Ela (Kilcalmonell).

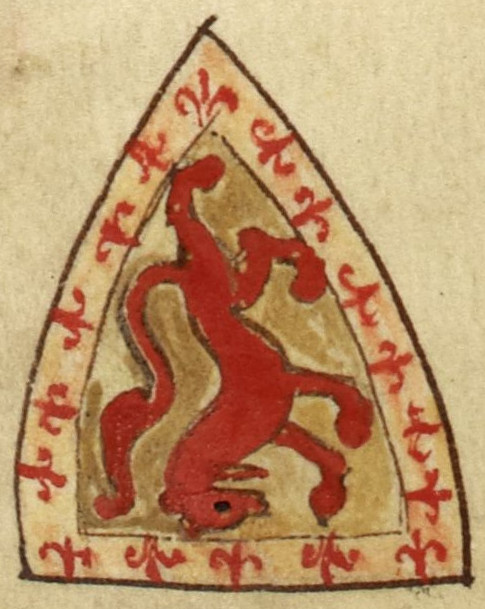
Coat of arms of Alexander II as it appears on folio 146v of British Library Royal 14 C VII (Historia Anglorum). The inverted shield represents the king's death in 1249.

In 1248, Haraldr Óláfsson, King of Mann and the Isles, and his newly-wedded wife, Cecilía Hákonardóttir, were lost at sea whilst sailing from Norway to the Isles. Upon learning of the catastrophe, Cecilía's father, Hákon Hákonarson, King of Norway, immediately sent Eóghan Mac Dubhghaill to temporarily take up the kingship of the Isles on his behalf. In the summer of 1249, Alexander launched an invasion of Argyll, directed at the very heart of the Clann Dubhghaill lordship. There is reason to suspect that a cooling in relations between Eóghan and Alexander II, along with Haraldr's unexpected demise and the resultant kin-strife over this man's succession, along with Eóghan's acceptance of royal powers on Hákon's behalf, could all have spurred the Scots' offensive. In the course of the campaign, Alexander II demanded that Eóghan renounce his allegiance to Hákon, and ordered him to hand over certain mainland and island fortresses. Eóghan stubbornly refused, and the unfolding crisis only ended with the Scottish king's sudden death in July 1249.

== Stewart overlordship in Argyll ==
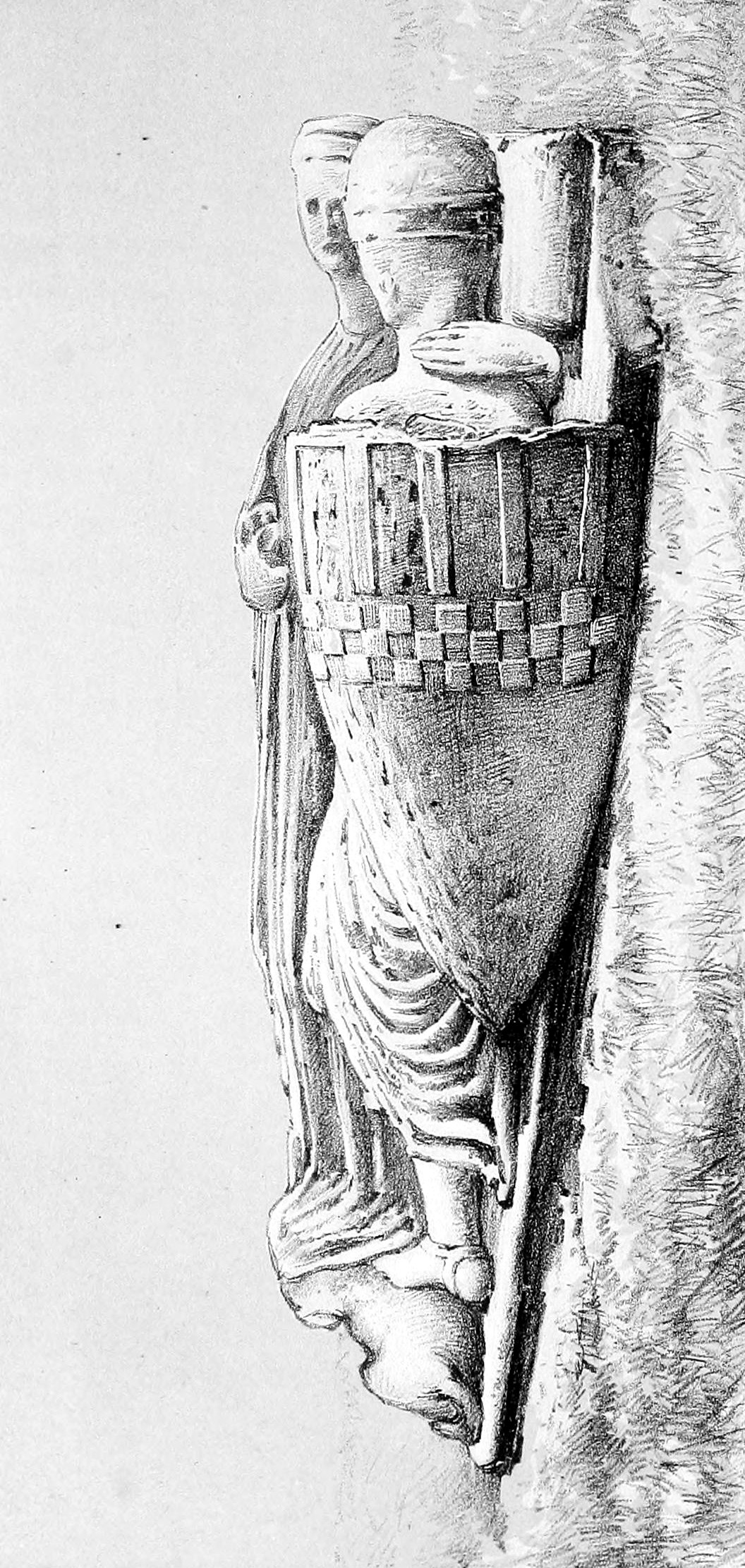
The effigy of Walter Stewart, Earl of Menteith and his wife, Mary I, Countess of Menteith. It is the earliest effigy of a married couple, side by side on the same tomb, in the British Isles.

About a decade after Alexander II's death, his son and royal successor, Alexander III, came of age and took steps to continue his father's expansion into Argyll and the Isles. Once again it was the Stewarts, this time in the person of Walter fitz Alan's son, Walter Stewart, Earl of Menteith, who spearheaded the westward campaign. Evidence of this push is preserved by the record of Clann Suibhne possessions granted away in the early 1260s. (Note: Walter Stewart was the first member of Stewart family to adopt a form of the surname Stewart despite not possessing the office of steward. He married a member of the comital kindred of Menteith, and was afterwards granted the earldom by Alexander III. Walter Stewart and his wife, Mary, gained a right to the earldom by the early 1260s. Walter Stewart was Sheriff of Ayr by 1264, and became Sheriff of Dumbarton sometime between 1271 and 1278. In time, members of this family adopted the surname Menteith.)

For example, on 17 April 1261, Dubhghall, with the consent of his heir Eóin, granted the church of St Colmán Ela to Paisley Abbey, along with the chapel of St Columba near Skipness Castle. Dubhghall's grant is stated to have been made for the welfare of his soul, those of his ancestors, and those of his wives, Juliana and Johanna, and a condition of his grant is that he was to have been buried at Paisley. (Note: One of the witnesses of this transaction was Walter Stewart. On 1 January 1262, Alan, Bishop of Argyll confirmed the acquisition of the church.)

Furthermore, a charter of Walter Stewart to Paisley Abbey, dating to 19 January 1262, confirms Dubhghall's grant to the abbey, and states that Dubhghall had earlier granted the lands of Skipness to Walter Stewart himself. (Note: Dubhghall is listed as one of witnesses of the transaction. Other attested witnesses were his nephews, Murchadh and Donn Sléibhe.) Dubhghall is elsewhere stated to have granted Walter Stewart his lands to be held as a "free barony" for two-thirds of a knight's service in the king's army. (Note: One of the recorded witnesses of this charter is Waldeve de Cochrane, the first attested man to bear a form of the surname Cochrane.) One of these transferred territories is recorded as "duabus Ungyns MacCrunnel", a place name that corresponds to Dubghall's title "lord of the land of Macherummel", used by the papal protection granted to Dubhghall in 1247. Additional evidence of the Stewarts' takeover of the Clann Suibhne heartland includes the record of grants made by Walter Stewart of several Knapdale churches—the churches of St Abbán moccu Corbmaic (Keills Chapel), St Michael (Kilmichael of Inverlussa), and St Mary/St Máel Ruba (Kilmory Chapel)—to Kilwinning Abbey. (Note: Moreover, an act of parliament of 1293 makes note of "the Earl of Menteith's land in Knapdale".)

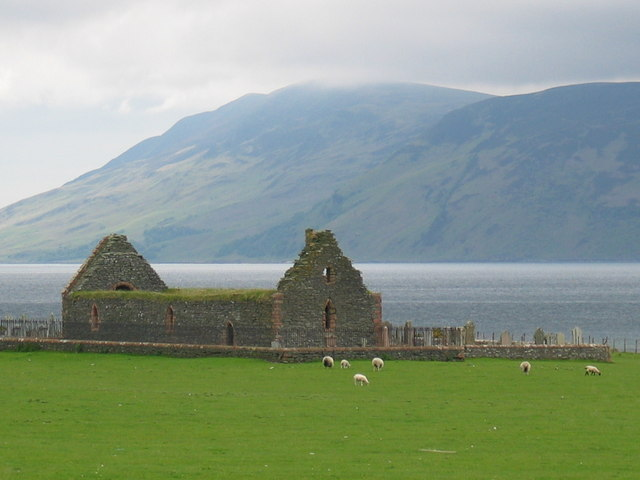
The chapel of St Brendan (Kilbrannan Chapel), next to Skipness Castle, dates to the thirteenth- or fourteenth century, and appears to have replaced the castle's chapel of St Columba after the Stewarts seized control of the Clann Suibhne lordship. (Note: Like Skipness Castle, the chapel of St Columba dates to the first half of the thirteenth century. Although Clann Suibhne were clearly patrons of Columba's cult at Skipness, the incoming Stewarts appear to have superseded the saint's chapel with one devoted to St Brendan. The chapel of St Brendan (Kilbrannan Chapel) sits about four hundred metres away from the castle, and appears to date to the thirteenth- or fourteenth century. This is about the time that the chapel of St Columba was secularised and incorporated into the remodelled castle structure. By the fourteenth century, devotion to St Brendan was closely associated with the Stewarts and their centre of power on Bute. St Columba, on the other hand, was the most important saint to the Islesmen. For example, Raghnall's grant to Paisley includes and oath to the saint. Furthermore, according to the thirteenth-century Hákonar saga Hákonarsonar, as Alexander II lay on his death bed in Argyll, he had a dream-vision of St Óláfr Haraldsson, St Magnús Erlendsson, and St Columba, exhorting him not to invade the Isles. The thirteenth-century Chronica majora also relates that the dying king "incurred the displeasure of God and St Columba".)

The circumstances surrounding of Dubhghall's contract with Walter Stewart are unclear. There are no other records regarding the allotment of Clann Suibhne lands during this period, and it is not known if the Stewarts or their allies had already established themselves in Knapdale.

The transactions involving Clann Suibhne reveal that the family was progressively deprived of its territories. Whether the charters are evidence of a military invasion is unknown. The creation of a Stewart lordship in the region may have been undertaken in the context of extending Scottish royal authority into Argyll and the Isles. From the perspective of both the Stewarts and the Scottish Crown, Clann Suibhne seems to have represented a significant threat to regional stability. The removal or destruction of such families appears to represent part of a strategy to not only dislodge unpalatable kindreds (like Clann Suibhne), but to also forge new partnerships with more loyal kindreds (like Clann Dubhghaill and Clann Domhnaill), and extend the power of committed agents of the Scottish Crown (like the Stewarts).

Clann Suibhne's power in Knapdale and Kintyre appears to have ended by the 1260s, with the family being replaced by the Stewarts. The transition of power certainly seems to have marked an increase in Scottish authority in Argyll, and may have been a factor in Eóghan's remarkable refusal to assist Hákon against the Scottish Crown later that decade. The fact that members of Clann Suibhne were unwilling to subject themselves to Stewart domination is evinced by the subsequent record of Dubhghall's nephew, Murchadh Mac Suibhne, supporting the Norwegian cause.

== See also ==
- Eóin Mac Suibhne, a fourteenth-century descendant of Dubhghall's nephew, Murchadh, who attempted to retake the Clann Suibhne ancestral lands in Argyll
