= Dubhghall =

The personal name Dubhghall may refer to:

- Dubhghall mac Ruaidhrí
- Dubhghall mac Somhairle
- Dubhghall mac Suibhne
