= Rahan =

Rahan may refer to:

== Places ==
- Rahan, County Offaly, a parish and village in Ireland
- Rahan Castle, a ruined castle near Dunkineely, County Donegal, Ireland

== Other uses ==
- Rahan (comics), a French comics series about an intelligent prehistoric man, first published in 1969

== See also ==
- Do Rahan, Isfahan, a village in Padena-ye Olya Rural District, Isfahan Province, Iran
- Miyan Rahan City, the capital of Dinavar District, Kermanshah Province, Iran
- Ngyaung-u-Tsau Rahan (AKA Saw Rahan II, c. 924 – 1001), King of Burma
- Sar Takht-e Do Rahan, a village in Khuzestan Province, Iran
