= Artúr Dall Mac Gurcaigh =

Scottish poet

Artúr Dall Mac Gurcaigh was a Scottish poet. He was the author of the Gaelic poem Dál chabhlaigh ar Chaistéal Suibhne ("An assembling of a fleet against Castle Sween").

One possibility is that the poem depicts an expedition by Eóin Mac Suibhne, a leading member of Clann Suibhne, to reclaim his ancestral seat from John Menteith. Historically, Eóin and his brothers were granted the lands of Knapdale from Edward II, King of England, provided that they could seize the castle from John, a supporter of Robert I, King of Scotland.

Another possibility is that the poem depicts an expedition by a later member of Clann Suibhne: Eóghan Mac Suibhne, brother of Toirdhealbhach Caoch Mac Suibhne, Lord of Fanad (died 1399).
