= Suibhne mac Duinnshléibhe =

Scottish magnate

Suibhne
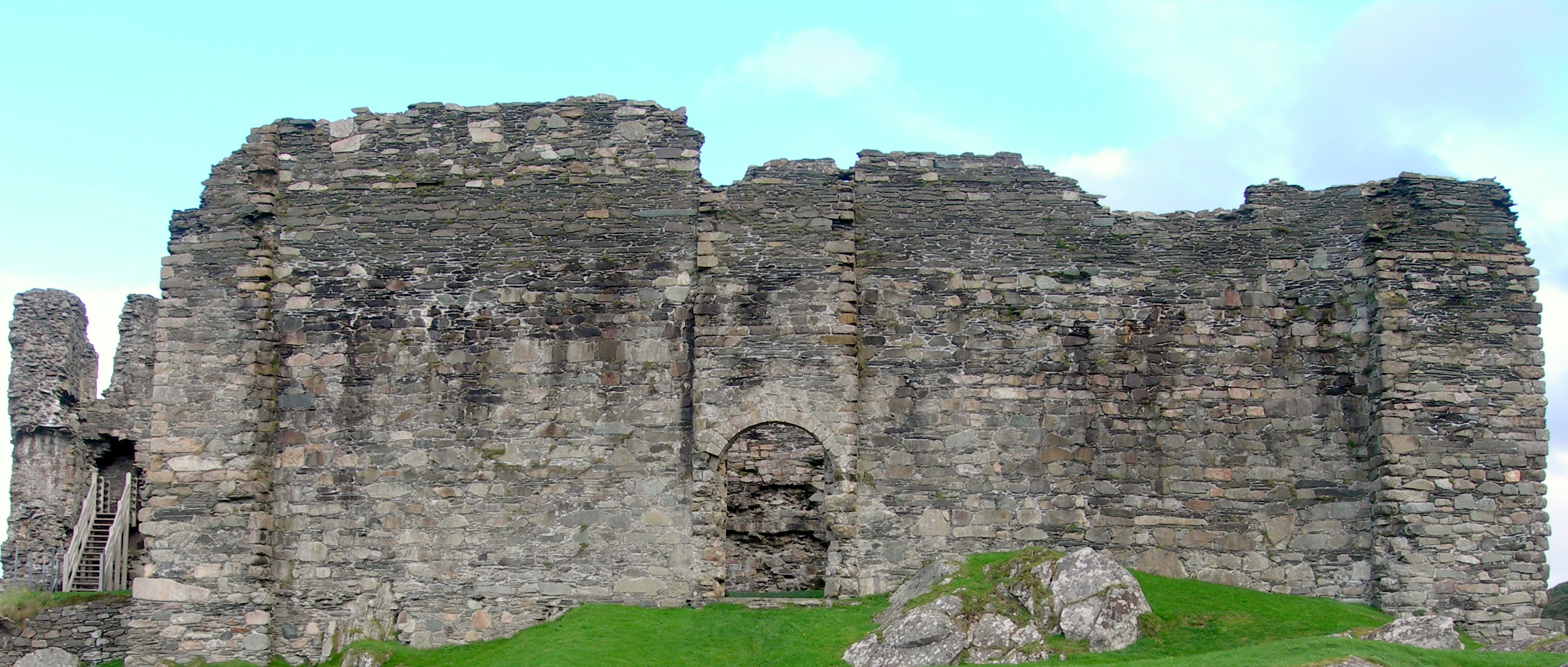
- Castle Sween, traditionally said, and later acknowledged to have been built by Suibhne
- Known for: Eponymous ancestor of Clann Suibhne; claimed builder of Castle Sween.
- Children: Dubhghall (son); Maol Mhuire (son); unnamed daughter
- Parent: Donnshléibhe (father)

Notes
- Suibhne's father, and daughter, are only known from later tradition; sons Dubhghall and Maol Mhuire appear in contemporary records.

Suibhne mac Duinnshléibhe was a late 12th-century, and early 13th-century, lord in Argyll. He does not appear in contemporary records, although his name appears in the patronymic names of two of his sons. Suibhne appears in the 16th century Leabhar Chlainne Suibhne, which documents the early history of Clann Suibhne. This account claims that he is the ancestor of Irish clan Mac Sweeney (Suibhne), and that he was the builder of Castle Sween in Knapdale, Argyll.

== Background ==
Suibhne is thought to have lived in the late 12th century, and early 13th century. He does not appear in any contemporary records, but the records of patronymic names of his sons and descendants prove his existence. His name, Suibhne, has been stated by some commentators to be Gaelic in origin, and by others to be Norse in origin. The name itself is Gaelic, meaning "pleasant". Sources state that Suibhne has no etymological connexon with the Norse Suinn. He is stated to have been Thane of Glassrie (Glassary) and Knapdale.

One commentator states that "Suibhne's descent is traced in the genealogies through three generations to Aodh Athlomhan 0 Neill, who died in 1033. At the latter period the O Neills pass out of prominence in the Annals, and it is impossible to determine from reliable sources the names of Aodh's sons. None of the persons intervening between him and Suibhne are mentioned in contemporary documents. On the other hand, there is a probability that the linking of Suibhne to Clann Neill is an artificial one, and was invented by the genealogists at a period when the Mac Sweeneys had arisen to considerable power in Ireland." Another states that "the MacSuibhne (McSweeney) genealogies; they were of Norse origin and not a Cenél nEógain family at all".

== Sources ==
=== Leabhar Chlainne Suibhne ===
The Leabhar Chlainne Suibhne is a traditional account of Clan Sweeney. It was written in Ireland, starting in about 1513, and it states that Suibhne was the eponymous ancestor of the Sweeneys, and the builder of Castle Sween in Scotland.

According to W.D.H. Sellar, there is no reason to doubt the Leabhar Chlainne Suibhne's claim that Suibhne was the eponymous ancestor of the Sweeneys, or the builder of Castle Sween, and the Mac Sweens occupied a position of great importance in West Highland affairs.

=== Annals of Ulster ===
The name Donnsléibe appears in the annals for the first time as the grandson of Eochaid (ua EOchada), as having killed ua Maelruanaid in battle in AD 1071, in 1080 he went into Mumu (Munster) with the nobles of the Ulaid to seek hire, in 1081 he killed ua Mathgamna, king of Ulaid at Dún dá Lethglas (Downpatrick), and in 1084 he was named as the king of Ulaid.

In 1091, Donnsléibe ua EOchada, king of Ulaid was killed in battle by the king of Aileach, the seat of the Cenel Eoghain (ua Neill). The descendents of Donnsléibe would mostly retain the kingship of Ulaid until their fatal defeat at the hands of John de Courcy in 1177 at Downpatrick.

In 1201, the Gaelic kingship of Ulaid was lost forever on the death of Ruaidhri mac Duinnshleibhe by the foreigners under John de Coursy, the Anglo Norman knight. In the period between 1177 to c 1200, members of the Duinnshleibhe Dynasty dispersed to County Donegal, where they later became the hereditary physicians to the O'Donnell clan chieftains of Donegal, for example Cormac Mac Duinnshleibhe (fl. 1459).

=== Argyll and the Western Isles 1098–1266 ===
In 1098 Magnus Barelegs, king of Norway successfully subdued unrest in Orkney, the Hebrides, and the Isle of Man. On his return North, he and Edgar, king of Scotland agreed the transfer of the Western Isles and a large part of Argyll to Magnus, because at this time Edgar was facing troubles to his West and South, so he decided it was better to face only South toward England.

In 1103 Magnus was killed on an unsuccessful raid into Ulaid (then Duinnshleibhe territory), after which his family entered into bloody civil-war, that resulted in their inability to maintain their authority in and around the Irish Sea. No other Norwegian ruler returned there to assert their authority until King Hakon IV, who led an unsuccessful expedition to the Isles in 1263. These and other events enabled the Norse-Gael rulers of the Isles to operate independently outside Norway for 160 years.

In 1156 after an inconclusive battle, Somerled mac Gillebrigte, a Norse-Gael warrior divided the Isle of Man with his opponent Godfrey the Manx King. Then in 1158 he fully wrested from Godfrey the Kingdom of Man and the Western Isles of Scotland. In 1164 Somerled and many of his Hebridean Army fell in the Battle of Renfrew, after which his kingdom was divided among his heirs.

This was the political and military environment in which Suibhne mac Duinnshleibhe would have lived and survived as Lord of Knapdale on the western seaboard of Scotland in the late 12th to early 13th Centuries.

Somerled had five sons: Dugald, Ranald, Angus, Olaf (of whom nothing more is known), and Gillabrigte (who perished with his father at Renfrew), all of whom are collectively referred to as the MacSorleys. Some instability existed whenever Dugald and Ranald fought over the division of their father's territory.

MacSorley territory lay just landward North, and seaward West of Knapdale, where Suibhne held his Lordship in the same period. By accident or otherwise, Dunadd (Dun Att), a defensible site within the ancient kingdom of Dál Riata, spanning parts of Ulaid and Argyll, was located in Suibhne's Knapdale. In the same period Suibhne named one of his sons Dubhghall, while Dugald son of Somerled ruled in Argyll.

In 1258 Domhnall Óg O'Donnell returned to Donegal to become clan chief, after having been fostered in Scotland with Clann Suibhne. He also married a daughter of Mac Suibhne.

In 1266 through the Treaty of Perth, Argyll and the Western Isles returned to the Kingdom of Scotland. This event and the earlier loss of their castles and land to supporters of the Scottish Crown, resulted in the dispersal of Clan Suibhne to County Donegal in Ireland, where they would later become the hereditary captains (galloglasses) to the O'Donnell chiefs of Donegal, and be reunited with their direct relatives, the Mac Duinnshléibhe physicians.

== Successors ==
Suibhne had two sons who appear in contemporary records. His son Dubhghall is recorded as granting, and witnessing, several charters. He was seated at Skipness Castle, in Kintyre. His other son, Maol Mhuire mac Suibhne married the granddaughter of a King of Connacht, High King of Ireland: the Annals of the Four Masters record that Beanmhidhe, daughter of Toirdhealbhach mac Ruaidhrí Ó Conchobhair, and wife of Maol Mhuire mac Suibhne, died in 1269. Beanmhidhe's grandfather, and Toirdelbach's father, was Ruaidrí Ua Conchobair, King of Connacht, High King of Ireland (d. 1198). The descendants of Maol Mhuire mac Suibhne founded the various branches of the Irish Clann Suibhne.

Maol Mhuire mac Suibhne had a son Murchaid, who had a son Maol Mhuire, who had a son Murchaid Mir/Mear (the mad), who is acknowledged as the ancestor of all true Mac Sweeneys, extant in Ireland or abroad.

== Places associated with Suibhne ==
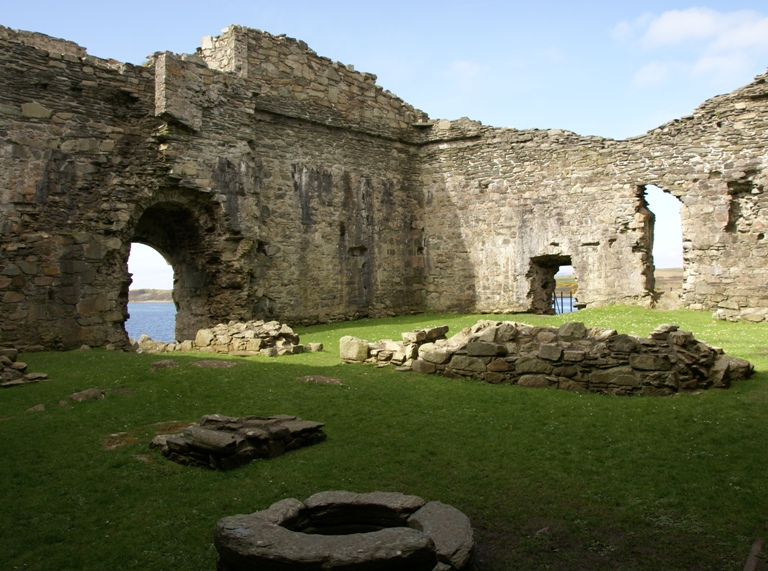
Interior of Castle Sween.

Suibhne is said to have left his name to Loch Sween, and to have built Castle Sween (Scottish Gaelic: Caisteal Suibhne) which overlooks its shores in Knapdale. The castle is thought to date to the late 12th century. It has been described as one of the oldest stone castles in Scotland. The original castle was a simple yet robust enclosure, and was lost to the MacSweens in the 13th century. The Castle underwent extensive remodelling while in the possession of the Stewart earls of Menteith. In 1310, it was in the possession of Sir John Menteith, when the English king Edward II granted the ancestral MacSween lands to John MacSween and his brothers, however due its steadfast occupation by Mentieth, the grant was not executed. The castle was finally destroyed in the mid 17th century.
