= Aithbhreac Inghean Coirceadal =

Scottish poet

- Years active: 1470
- Known for: Author of the earliest documented poem in Classic Scottish Gaelic, written by a woman.

Aithbhreac Inghean Coirceadal (fl. 1470) was a medieval Scottish poet.

In 1470, she wrote an elegy to her husband, Niall Òg Mac Nèill, Constable of Castle Sween, Knapdale, which was the earliest documented poem in Classic Scottish Gaelic, written by a woman. It was written in the Classic Bardic meter and is one of only four existing poems written in this style by a woman.
