= Doe Castle =

Former stronghold, County Donegal, Ireland

- Caisleán na dTuath (Irish)
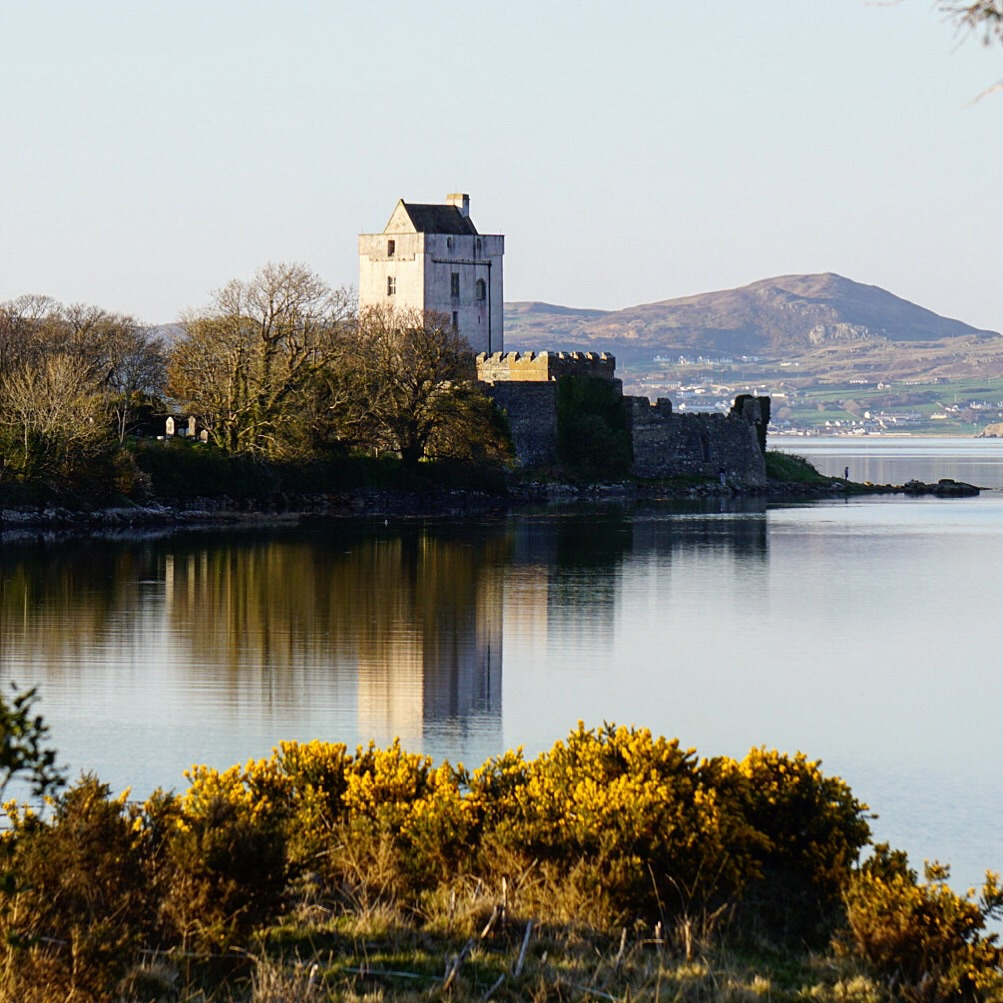
- Doe Castle from the front, featuring Towerhouse and Bawn Walls
- Interactive map of Doe Castle
- 55.135°N 7.864°W
- Location: Sheephaven Bay, County Donegal

History
- Built: Early 15th century

National monument of Ireland
- Official name: Doe Castle
- Reference no.: 319

Doe Castle, or Caisleán na dTuath, near Creeslough, County Donegal, was the historical stronghold of Clan tSuibhne (Clan McSweeney), with architectural parallels to the Scottish tower house. Built in the early 15th century, it is one of the better fortalices in the north-west of Ireland. The castle sits on a small peninsula, surrounded on three sides by water, with a moat cut into the rock of the landward side. The structure consists mainly of high outer walls around an interior bawn with a four-storey tower-house or keep.

== History ==
Doe Castle was most likely built c.1420 by the Quinn family, but by the 1440s, it had come into the hands of the gallowglass MacSweeney family. The castle remained in the hands of a branch of the Clan Sweeney known as Mac Suibhne na d'Tuath (Mac Sweeney Doe) for almost two hundred years until it was seized by King James VI and I because the MacSweeneys had rebelled against him. On 7 March 1613 during the Plantation of Ulster, the king granted the castle, along with other lands, to the Attorney-General for Ireland, Sir John Davies (poet, born 1569). On 31 December 1614, Sir John sold the castle to an English settler, Captain John Sandford from Shropshire, England.

It was there that Owen Roe O'Neill returned in 1642 to lead the Ulster Army of the Irish Confederate forces during the Wars of the Three Kingdoms.

The castle changed hands repeatedly during the 17th-century struggle for control of Ireland between the English and the Irish. It is known that in 1650, Sir Charles Coote, the Governor of Londonderry, took possession of the castle. Eventually, the castle was bought by Sir George Vaughan Hart and inhabited by his family until 1843.

== Today ==
In 1932, the castle came into the hands of the Land Commission, and in 1934 was declared a national monument and was acquired by the Office of Public Works. The tower house element of the castle underwent a major restoration in the 1990s.

Irish singer Brian McFadden proposed to his (now ex-) wife, Kerry Katona, at the castle in 2001, it being the spot where his grandfather also had proposed to his grandmother.

The castle grounds are open daily and guided tours of the tower house are available during the summer months.
