= Kilcalmonell =

Parish in Argyll and Bute, Scotland

Coordinates: 55.8°N 5.6°W

The parish of Kilcalmonell is situated in Argyll and Bute, Scotland. It extends from Clachan, in Kintyre to Kilberry, in Knapdale.
