= Castle Sween =

11th century castle in Scotland

- Achnamara, Loch Sween, Knapdale, Argyll, Scotland
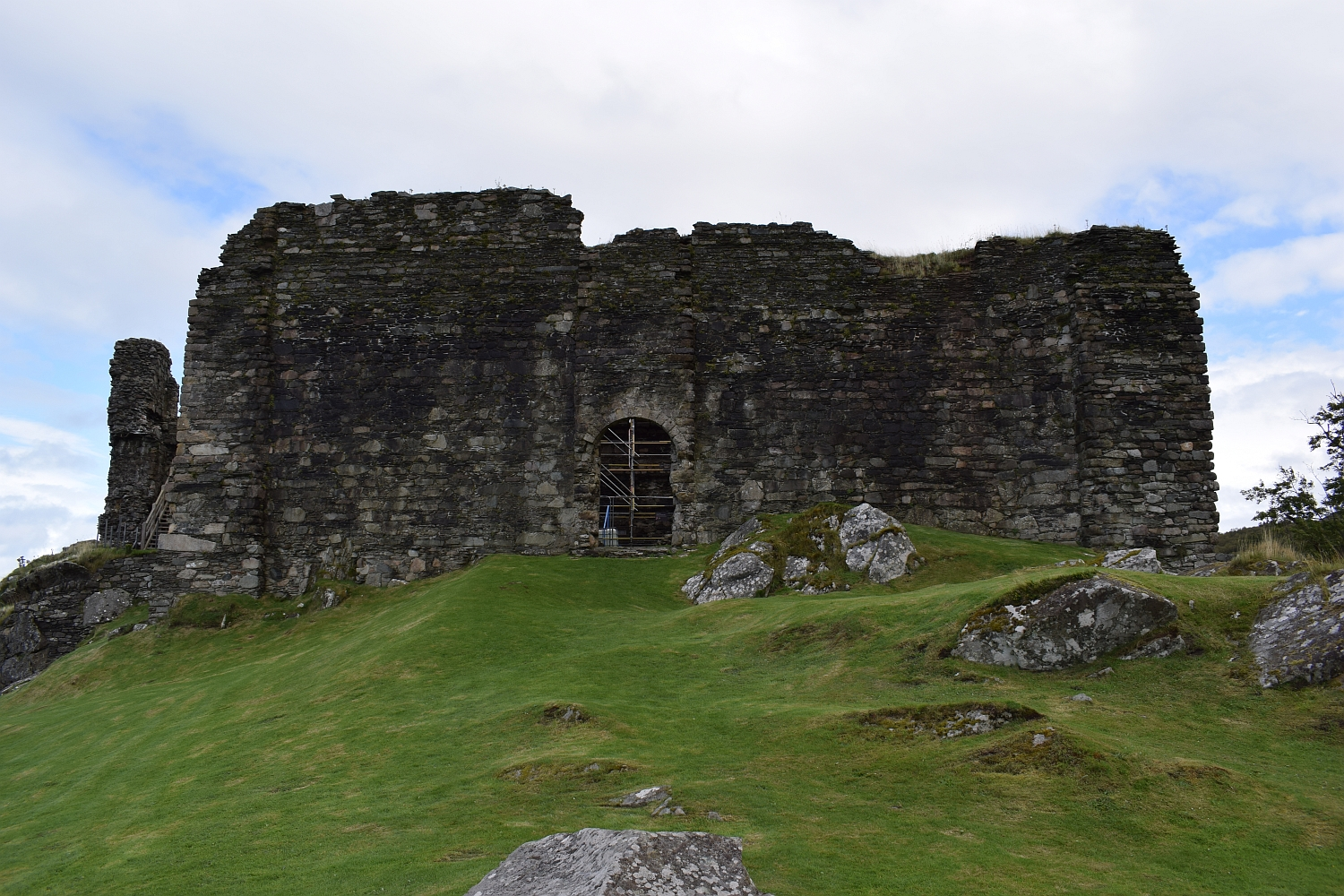
- The castle in 2024

Site information
- Type: Castle
- Owner: Historic Environment Scotland

Location
- Coordinates: 55.9479°N 5.6654°W

Site history
- Built: 11th century
- Built by: Suibhne

Scheduled monument
- Official name: Castle Sween
- Type: Prehistoric domestic and defensive: cave, Secular: castle
- Designated: 11 September 1995
- Reference no.: SM90068

Castle Sween, also known as Caisteal Suibhne, and Caistéal Suibhne, is located on the eastern shore of Loch Sween, in Knapdale, south of the forestry village of Achnamara on the west coast of Argyll, Scotland. Castle Sween is thought to be one of the earliest stone castles built in Scotland, having been built in the late 11th century. The castle's towers were later additions to wooden structures which have since vanished.

== History ==
Castle Sween is the oldest stone castle in Scotland, built in the late 11th century by Suibhne, son of Hugh Anrahan, brother of the king of Ulster and High King of Ireland, from whom it takes its name Suibhne.

As late as the thirteenth century, the MacSweens possessed the surrounding lands of Knapdale. However, by the second half of the century, these territories passed into the hands of the Stewart/Menteith family.

In 1310, Edward II, King of England, granted John MacSween, and his brothers, the MacSweens' ancestral lands of Knapdale, provided that they oust John Menteith. It is possible that MacSween, and his claim to his family's lost Scottish homeland, may be the subject of the Gaelic poem Dál chabhlaigh ar Chaistéal Suibhne. If so, this poem may well refer to an expedition by MacSween to retake Castle Sween in about 1310.

In 1323, after the death of John Menteith, the Lordship of Arran and Knapdale passed to his son and grandson. In 1376, half of Knapdale, which included the castle, passed into the possession of John MacDonald I, Lord of the Isles, by a grant from his father-in-law, Robert II, King of Scotland.

During the MacDonalds' century and a half of holding the castle, the castellans were first MacNeils and later MacMillans.

The 16th century manuscript known as The Book of the Dean of Lismore includes the lament of Aithbhreac Inghean Coirceadal (f. 1460), which remains a highly important poem in Scottish Gaelic literature. Aithbhreac, after being widowed, composed a lament addressed to the rosary of her late husband, a Tacksman of Clan MacNeil and former constable of Castle Sween.

In 1490, Castle Sween was granted to Colin Campbell, 1st Earl of Argyll, by James IV, King of Scotland.

In 1647, during the Wars of the Three Kingdoms, Castle Sween was attacked and burnt by Alasdair MacColla and his Irish Confederate followers.

In 1933, the castle was put in the care of the Historic Building and Monuments Directorate (HBMD). Currently Castle Sween is under the protection of Historic Environment Scotland.

== Conservation ==
A 2018 report from Historic Environment Scotland noted that Castle Sween is at "very high risk" of coastal erosion due to climate change.

== In popular culture ==
Castle Sween was featured in the 2021 Starz TV series Men in Kilts: A Roadtrip With Sam and Graham (from Outlander) episode 7 "Clans and Tartans".

== Gallery ==
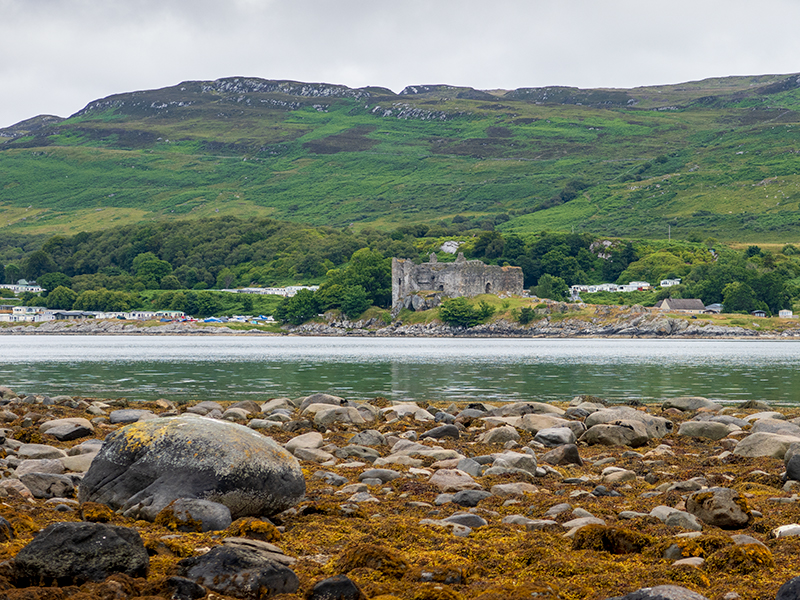
View from the Island of Danna in 2021

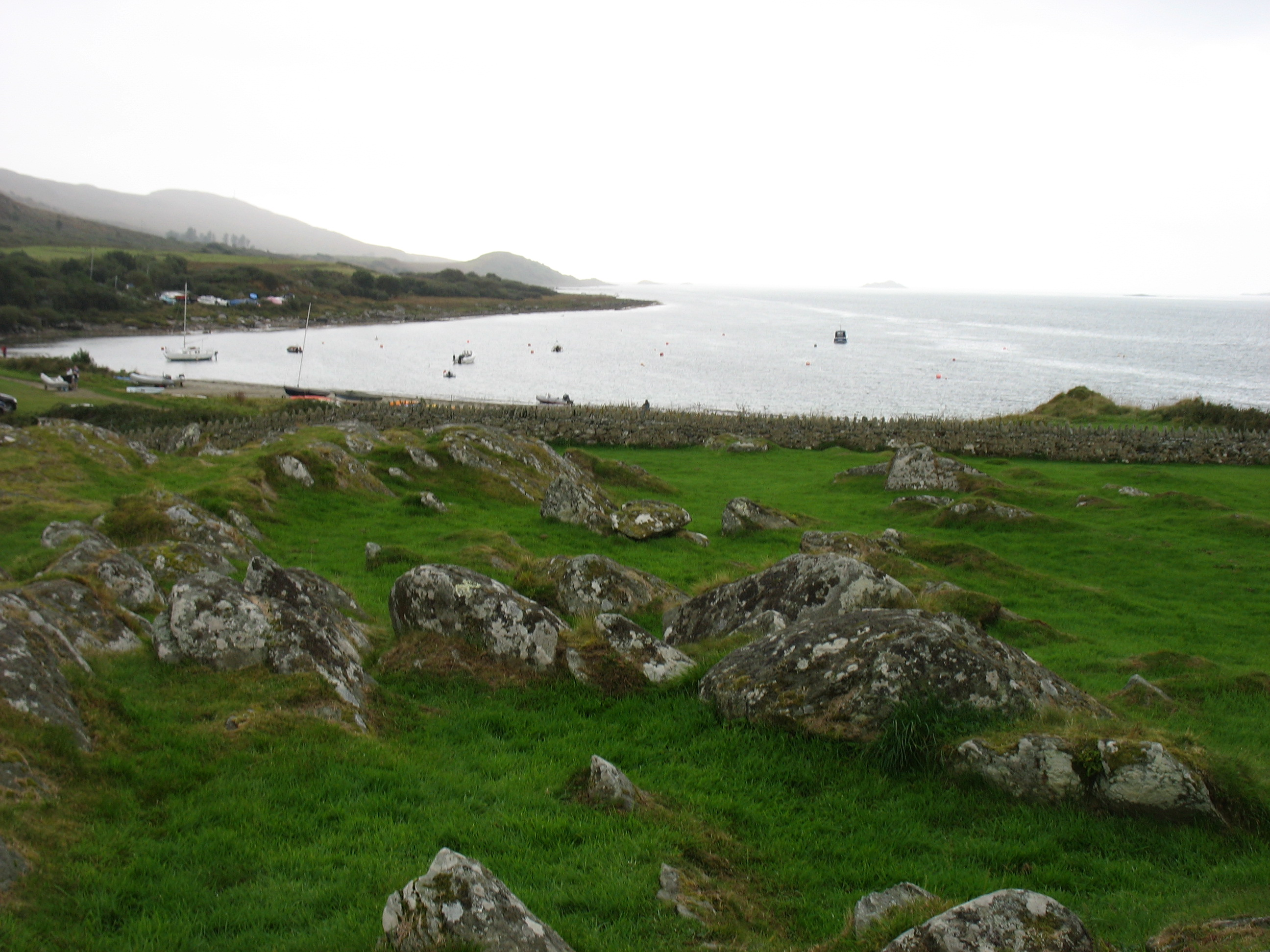
Loch Sween from the castle in 2014

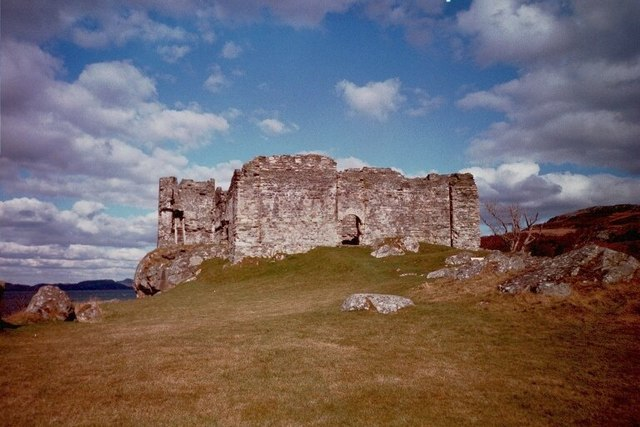
The castle in 2001

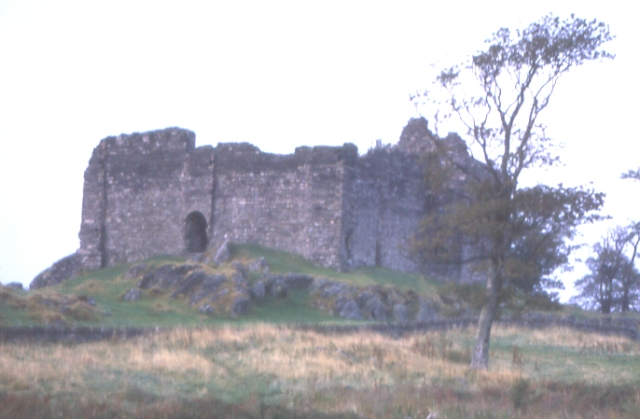
The castle in 1972

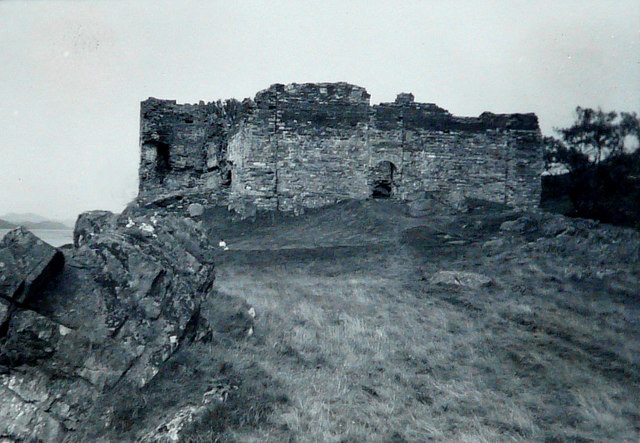
The castle in 1959

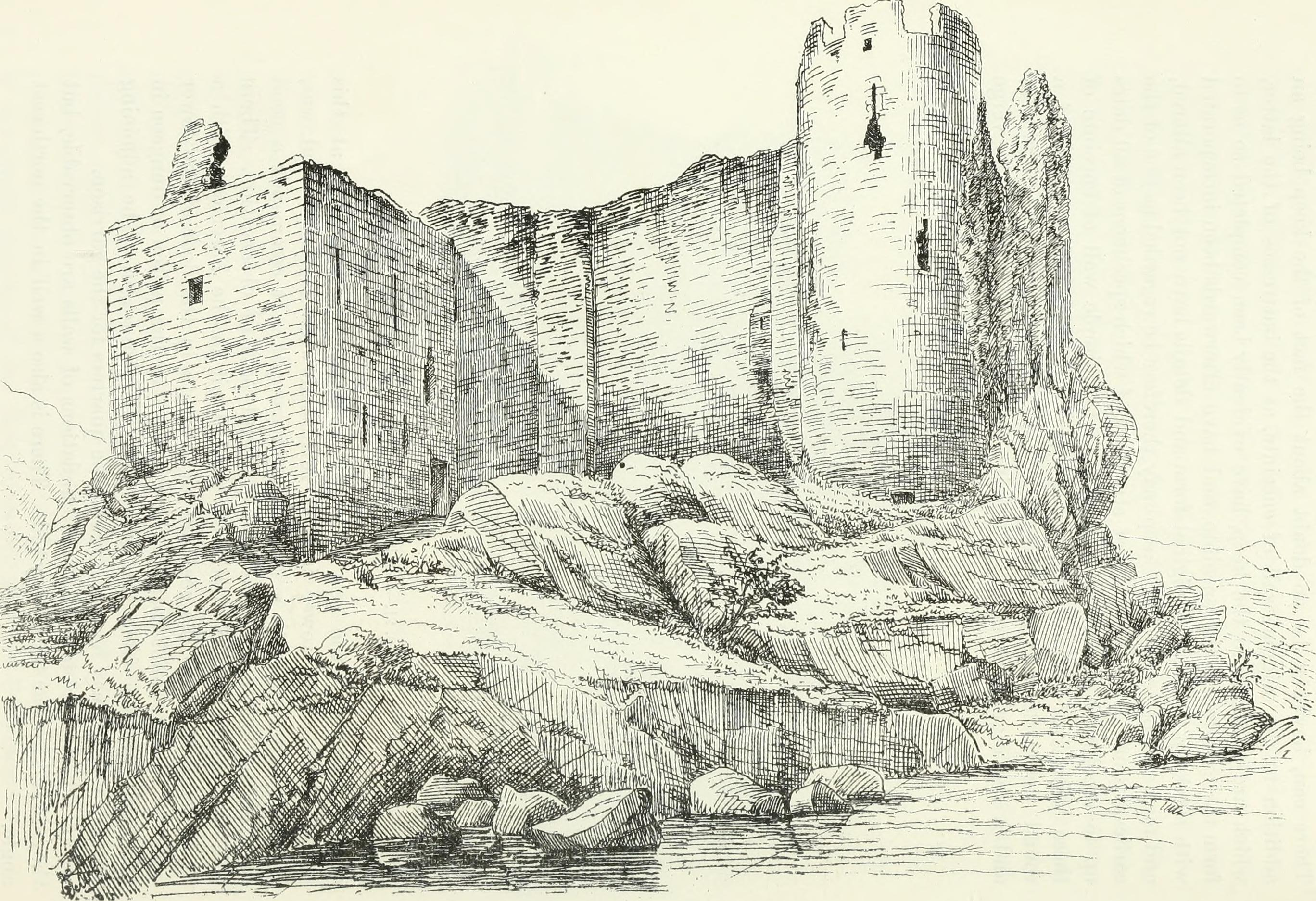
The castle c.1880
