= Clan Sweeney =

Irish clan

- Clann Suibhne
- Motto: Tuaga tulaig abu (Tuaga territory forever)
- War cry: Battalia-abu (The noble staff, victorious)

Profile
- Region: Ireland, Highland
- Founder: Suibhne
- Clan Sweeney no longer has a chief, and is an armigerous clan
- Historic seat: Castle Sween, Scotland; Doe Castle, Ireland
Clan branches
- Mac Suibhne Fánad
- Mac Suibhne na d'Tuath
- Mac Suibhne Boghaineach

Clan Sweeney is an Irish clan of Scottish Highlands origin. The Mac Suibhne family did not permanently settle in Ireland before the beginning of the 14th century, when they became Gallowglass soldiers for the Ua Domnaill dynasty of Tír Chonaill. The clan also claims an Irish descent from a prince of the Uí Néill dynasty. However this is doubted by other commentators, see Wikipedia page Suibhne mac Duinnshléibhe

== Origins ==
Leabhar Clainne Suibhne states that after Áed's death, although his older brother Domnall was the rightful heir, Ánrothán was chosen instead to be king. Ánrothán then gave up the kingship to his brother and made for Argyll, Scotland where he married a daughter of the King of Scotland. Ánrothán's great-grandson was Suibhne, from whom the clan derived its name.

The history from Leabhar Clainne Suibhne may be a fabrication that provides the clan with a pedigree connecting them to the Milesian kings of Ireland, although historian W. D. H. Sellar believes this history may be genuine. However others believe this history is not genuine, see Wikipedia page Suibhne mac Duinnshléibhe

== MacSweens of Scotland ==
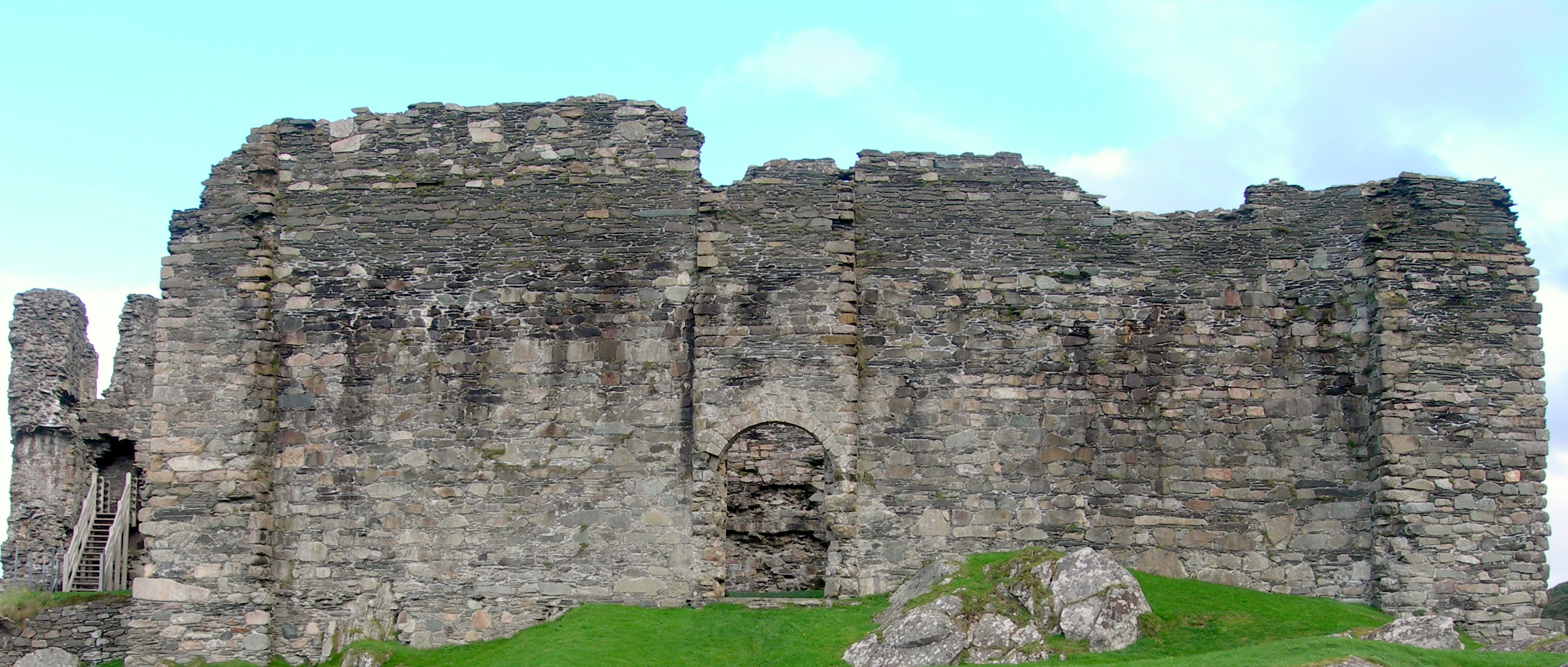
Castle Sween, thought to have been built by Suibne, son of Dunslebh, son of Aodh of Buirche (Hugh the Splendid), son of Ánrothán.

In the 13th century the MacSweens controlled lands across central Argyll, extending as far north as Loch Awe and as far south as Loch Fyne. Their principal seats included Lochranza Castle on the Isle of Arran, Skipness Castle and Castle Sween at Knapdale, which is probably Scotland's oldest surviving stone-built castle.

The MacSweens held this lordship of Knapdale and lands in Kintyre until 1262. That year Dugall MacSween granted or surrendered to Walter Stewart, Earl of Menteith the lands of Skipnish (Skipness), Killislate (South Knapdale) and other lands in the parish of Kilcalmonell in Kintyre. Following this the Earl granted several churches in Knapdale to the monastery of Kilwinning, showing that he now had control of both North and South Knapdale. Also in the same year Alexander III of Scotland granted Lochranza Castle, another MacSween castle, to Walter Stewart, Earl of Menteith.

In 1263 Haakon IV of Norway sailed down the western coast of Scotland with an invasion fleet from Norway. With the arrival of the royal fleet Norse control in the Western Isles and Argyll was re-established, and the Norwegian king's force was strengthened by Islesmen. Among those pressed into his service were the deposed MacSweens of Knapdale, under Murchadh MacSween. The MacSweens seemed to have been of doubtful loyalty as they were forced to also surrender hostages to guarantee their support. Haakon had "given" Arran to Murchadh, but ultimately, the Norwegian invasion was defeated at what is known today as the Battle of Largs. Other sources believe that the Battle of Largs was inconclusive.

The Earl of Menteith still controlled Knapdale in 1293, and in 1301 Knapdale was being held by his successor, Sir John Stewart (Sir John Menteith). It was then that John MacSween approached Edward I of England, asserting that one of the king's enemies, Sir John Menteith, had deprived MacSween of his inheritance. Between 1301 and 1310, John MacSween was in the service of the English in the hope of keeping alive his family's claim against the Menteiths.

During the Great Cause, which led to the First War of Scottish Independence, the MacSweens were supporters of the powerful MacDougall Lords of Lorne who supported John Balliol as patriots, as long as John was king of Scotland. However, in 1301, John Macsween, Lord of Knapdale, joined Angus Og Macdonald, by then Lord of the Isles, in a campaign against Alexander MacDougall, Lord of Argyll and Lorne, for his murder of Angus Og's elder brother, Alexander Og Macdonald in Ireland in 1299.

After the murder of John Comyn, the nephew of Balliol, by Bruce and his companions in 1306, the First War of Scottish Independence became at one and the same time a civil war. The Balliols, Comyns and MacDougalls taking the side of the English in opposition to the Macdonalds and the Bruce, crowned Robert I of Scotland on 25 March 1306.

This was an era of constantly shifting alliances, and in 1301 John MacSween was in alliance with Aonghus Óg Mac Domhnaill, Lord of Islay (died 1314×1318/c.1330) against the MacDougalls of Lorne. In 1307 the MacDougalls were the bitterest of Robert the Bruce's enemies, and the man in command of the rebellion against Bruce was Sir John Menteith, who had previously removed the MacSweens from their castle in Knapdale.

By 1310, when Bruce had most of Argyll and the North Channel in his favour, the English encouraged John MacDougall, the son of Alexander MacDougall and now the ousted Lord of Lorne, to raise a fleet in 1311, based on the eastern coast of Ireland. MacDougall was aided in part by the MacSweens, including John and his brothers Toirdelbach and Murdoch. It was around this time in 1310, that Edward II of England granted John and his brothers their family's ancestral lands of Knapdale, provided they could recover it from Sir John Menteith. It is possible, therefore, that this event could have been the "tryst of a fleet against Castle Sween", recorded in the Book of the Dean of Lismore, which tells of the failed attempt by John MacSween to recapture Castle Sween. With the failure to recapture their lands in Scotland, the MacSweens permanently left for Ireland.

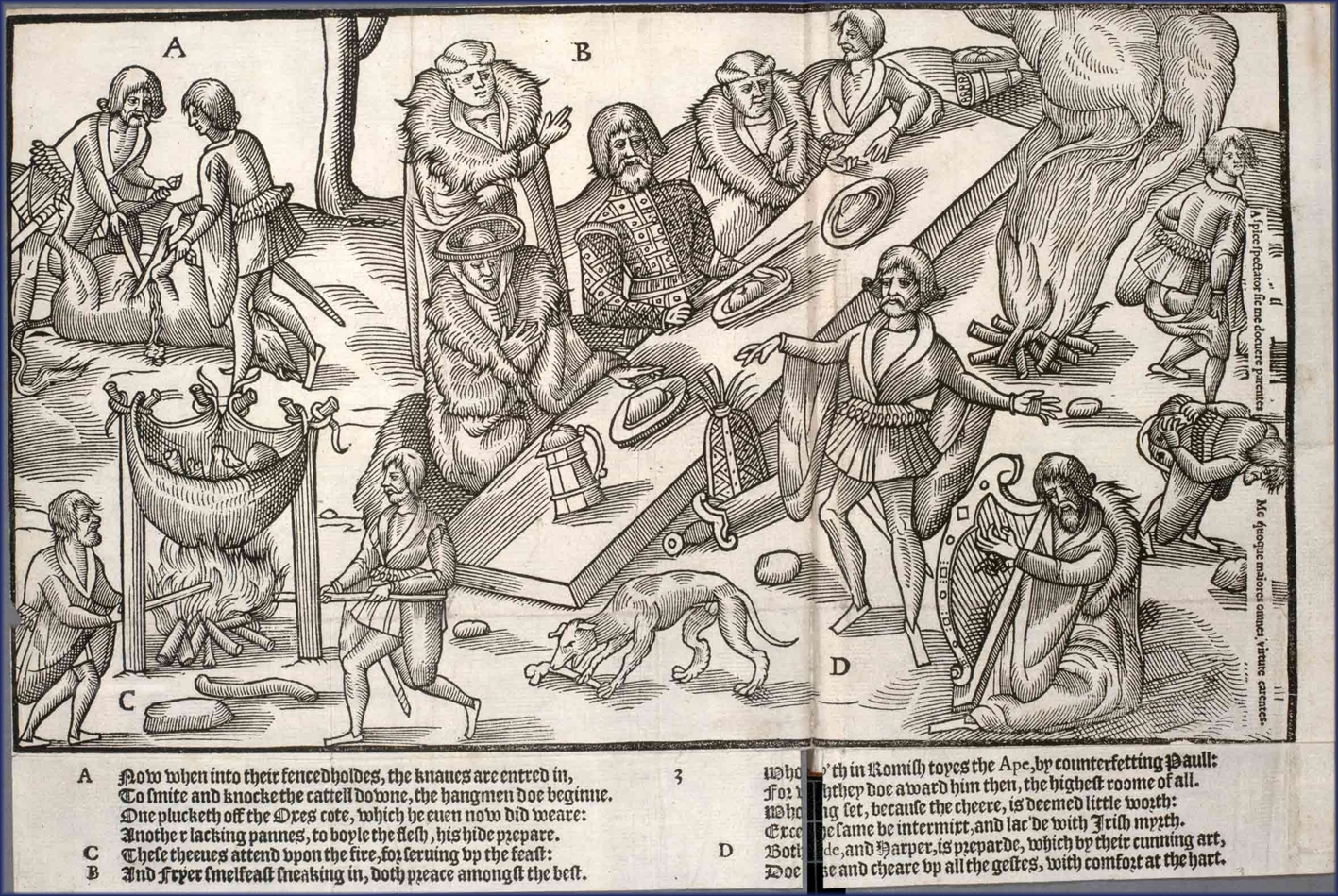
A plate from The Image of Irelande, by John Derricke, published in 1581. The chief sitting at his table, entertained by his bard and harper is thought to be a "Mac Sweyne".

A contingent of the MacSweens eventually re-established themselves at Donegal as Gallowglass mercenary soldiers and became the progenitors of Clan Sweeney. Some of those who stayed on in Scotland formed into the Clan MacQueen.

== Arrival in Ireland ==
The earliest record of a Mac Suibhne, in relation to the clan, is of Murchadh Mac Suibne in 1267. Murchadh's father was Máel Muire an Sparáin of Castle Sween in Knapdale, who was himself the son of Suibne. Murchadh became a prisoner of Domnall Ó Conchobair and was handed over to the Earl of Ulster, in whose prison Murchadh is said to have died.

Once established in Ireland the Clan Sween controlled large territories, and was divided into three branches:

- Mac Suibhne Fánad (Mac Sweeney Fanad)
- Mac Suibhne na d'Tuath (Mac Sweeney Doe)
- Mac Suibhne Boghaineach (Mac Sweeney Banagh)

Rathmullan was the seat of MacSuibhne Fanad for the next 400 years, during which time their influence extended from Donegal into Connacht and Munster. In Donegal their principal seats were Doe Castle and Rahan Castle near Killybegs.

In Scotland the inauguration of the MacSuibhne Clan chiefs had taken place at Iona, where they were also buried. In Ireland they were inaugurated in Kilmacrennan, County Donegal, where MacSuibhne Fanad became influential allies of the O'Donnell of Tyrconnell. The remains of the Sweeneys who went to Ireland are interred outside the walls of Castle Doe, County Donegal.

The historian James Logan, in The Scottish Gaël, remarked how the Mac Swineys were notable for their hospitality. At a seat of theirs, Clodach Castle, there was a stone set near the highway which was inscribed with an open invitation to travellers to make for Clodach for refreshment. At some point, one of the family overturned the stone and subsequently were said to have never prospered. Logan also noted that the war-cry of the Mac Sweins was "Battalia-abu" (The noble staff, victorious), from the battle-axe they bore in their Arms.

== Branches ==
=== Mac Suibhne Fánad (Mac Sweeney Fanad) ===
Fánad, is the peninsula between Lough Swilly and Mulroy Bay, on the north coast of County Donegal.

The first Mac Suibhne to settle in Tír Conaill was Eoin, grandson of Máel Muire. It was Eoin who expelled the ruling Ó Breisléins from Fánad after 1263, and whose daughter married the Ó Domnaill, king of Tír Conaill. The male line of the ruling Mac Suibhnes soon failed after Eoin, when both his son, Suibne, and his brother, Toirdelbach, died without heirs.

Following the Battle of Bannockburn in 1314 Murchad Mear, great-grandson of Máel Muire an Sparáin and grandson of the Murchadh who died while a prisoner of the Earl of Ulster, arrived at Lough Swilly with his followers.

Murchad Mear was succeeded by his son, Murchad Óc, as lord of the lands east of Bearnas Mór. One of Murchad Óc's sons, Máel Muire, became lord of Fanad, and another son, Donnchad Mór, became lord of the Tri Tuatha in north west County Donegal, which had been conquered from the Ó Báegills.

Máel Muire defeated Niall Ó Domhnaill in the battle of Achadh Móna but later became an ally of Ó Domhnaill, when Niall killed his brother, Conchobhar Ó Domhnaill, King of Tír Chonaill in 1342. Because of his aid, Máel Muire was granted the lands of Moross in the north of Fanad.

Máel Muire's successor was his son, Toirdhealbhach Caoch, who pledged to Ó Domhnaill, that he and his successors would provide two Gallowglass soldiers for every quarter of land in his territory when the Ó Domhnaills went to war.

Toirdhealbhach Caoch's son, Toirdhealbhach Ruadh, succeeded his father in 1399 but only after defeating two uncles who tried to wrest the lordship away from him. Toirdhealbhach Ruadh was aided against his uncles by Toirdhealbhach an Fhíona Ó Domhnaill, king of Tír Conaill. Toirdhealbhach Ruadh accompanied Niall Ó Domhnaill and Domhnall Ó Néill, when they defeated the English Lord Deputy at Meath in 1423. Though there are contradicting sources that record Mac Suibhne of Connacht present at this battle. In 1434 Niall Ó Domhnaill was captured by the English forces in a skirmish, though Toirdhealbhach Ruadh rescued Ó Domhnaill following the defeat at the English's hands.

In around 1438 Toirdhealbhach Ruadh is thought to have died, having ruled for thirty nine years. Afterwards his son, Ruaidhrí, succeeded him, though not without dispute. Ruaidhrí's uncle, Donnchadh Garbh, claimed the lordship and the two resolved their differences in a wrestling match in which Ruaidhrí was victorious. Ruaidhrí ruled for thirteen years when he died and was succeeded by his brother, Domhnall.

In 1456 Énrí Ó Néill, king of Tír Eoghain, with the sons of Neachtain Ó Domhnaill, invaded Inishowen. The invaders were opposed by the ruling Ó Domhnaill who was aided in part by Maol Mhuire Mac Suibhne, son of Toirdhealbhach Ruadh. Ó Domhnaill was later killed and Maol Mhuire and Ó Domhnaill's brother, Aodh Ruadh, were taken prisoner. Neachtain's son, Toirdhealbhach Cairbreach Ó Domhnaill, assumed the vacant kingship of Tír Conaill. Domhnall Mac Suibhne was then killed by his nephews (the sons of Ruaidhrí), who proclaimed Domhnall's cousin, Toirdhealbhach Bacach, as lord of Fanad.

In 1460 Aodh Ruadh Ó Domhnaill and Maol Mhuire Mac Suibhne were released from captivity, and in the following year they both defeated Toirdhealbhach Cairbreach near Mulroy Bay. On the victory, Aodh Ruadh was inaugurated and made Maol Mhuire lord of Fanad. Maol Mhuire Mac Suibhne ruled for eleven years before being killed on Easter Tuesday, 1472 while fighting alongside Aodh Ruadh against Énrí Ó Néill. After the battle, Maol Mhuire's body was taken to Derry for burial, covered in the flag of Mac Domhnaill of Antrim, a captain of Gallowglass captured in the battle.

Ruaidhrí succeeded his deceased father and built Rathmullan castle. Ruaidhrí's wife, Máire, was a daughter of Ó Máille, and was known for her piety. Ruaidhrí and Máire built Carmelite priory at Rathmullan which was completed in 1516. Ruaidhrí had many successful campaigns with Ó Domhnaill, though in 1497 Conn Ó Domhnaill was defeated in battle by Tadhg Diarmada and Ruaidhrí was taken prisoner, also in the same year Ó Domhnaill was again defeated and Ruaidhrí's son was captured.

When Ruaidhrí died in 1518 the lordship was again contested by members of the leading family. Domhnall Óg, a cousin of Ruaidhrí, was proclaimed lord by the chiefs of Cenél Conaill at Kilmacrenan, but Ruaidhrí's son, Toirdhealbhach, defied Domhnall Óg. When Domhnall Óg died in 1529 Toirdhealbhach had himself inaugurated at Kilmacrenan. This angered Aodh Dubh Ó Domhnaill, because he believed, only he alone had the right to inaugurate a sub chief of his. However in 1544 Toirdhealbhach was killed by the sons Domhnall Óg Mac Suibhne, in revenge. It was during this era that Leabhar Clainne Suibhne was written.

Domhnall Óg's son, Ruaidhrí Carrach, ruled for ten years until 1552 when he and his kin were killed.

In 1557 a Domhnall Gorm Mac Suibhne was leader of "Slíocht Domhnaill" and was recorded as being with Calbhach Ó Domhnaill in a victory over Seán an Díomais Ó Néill. Domhnall Gorm was killed in 1568 by his kin and was succeeded by Toirdhealbhach Óg who was a son of Toirdhealbhach who was killed in 1544. Toirdhealbhach Óg was killed in battle in 1570 at Dún na Long on the Foyle, by Toirdhealbhach Luineach Ó Néill. Toirdhealbhach Óg's brother, Domhnall, succeeded him and was the last chief inaugurated lord of Fanad. Domhnall lived into the 17th century and witnessed the end of the Gaelic order in Tír Conaill.

In 1599 Domhnall was recorded as taking part in a raid into Thomond.

In March 1601 an English garrison was stationed in Rathmullan and Domhnall submitted to the English. In September he rose against the English but by January 1602 he had again submitted. In 1607 when Ó Néill and Ruaidhrí Ó Domhnaill sailed out of Rathmullan, some of the crew had gone ashore to collect water and Domhnall's son attacked the crew but were routed.

In 1608 Domhnall was recorded as being on a list of jurors who indicted the earls of Tyrconnell and Tyrone for treason. For this Domhnall received a grant in the Plantation of Ulster. By 1619 he is recorded as having 2,000 acres (8.1 km^{2}) allotted to him, called Roindoberg and Caroocomony, on which he "built a good bawne, and a house, all of lime and stone, in which with his family, he dwelleth."

Domhnall's son, Dormhnall Gorm, married a daughter of Eoghan Óg Mac Suibhne na dTuath and had ten children, before dying in 1637.

Dormhnall Gorm's sons, Domhnall Óg and Aodh Buidhe are recorded having lands in Clondavaddog in north Fanad, held forfeit after the Irish Rebellion of 1641.

=== Mac Suibhne na d'Tuath (Mac Sweeney Doe) ===
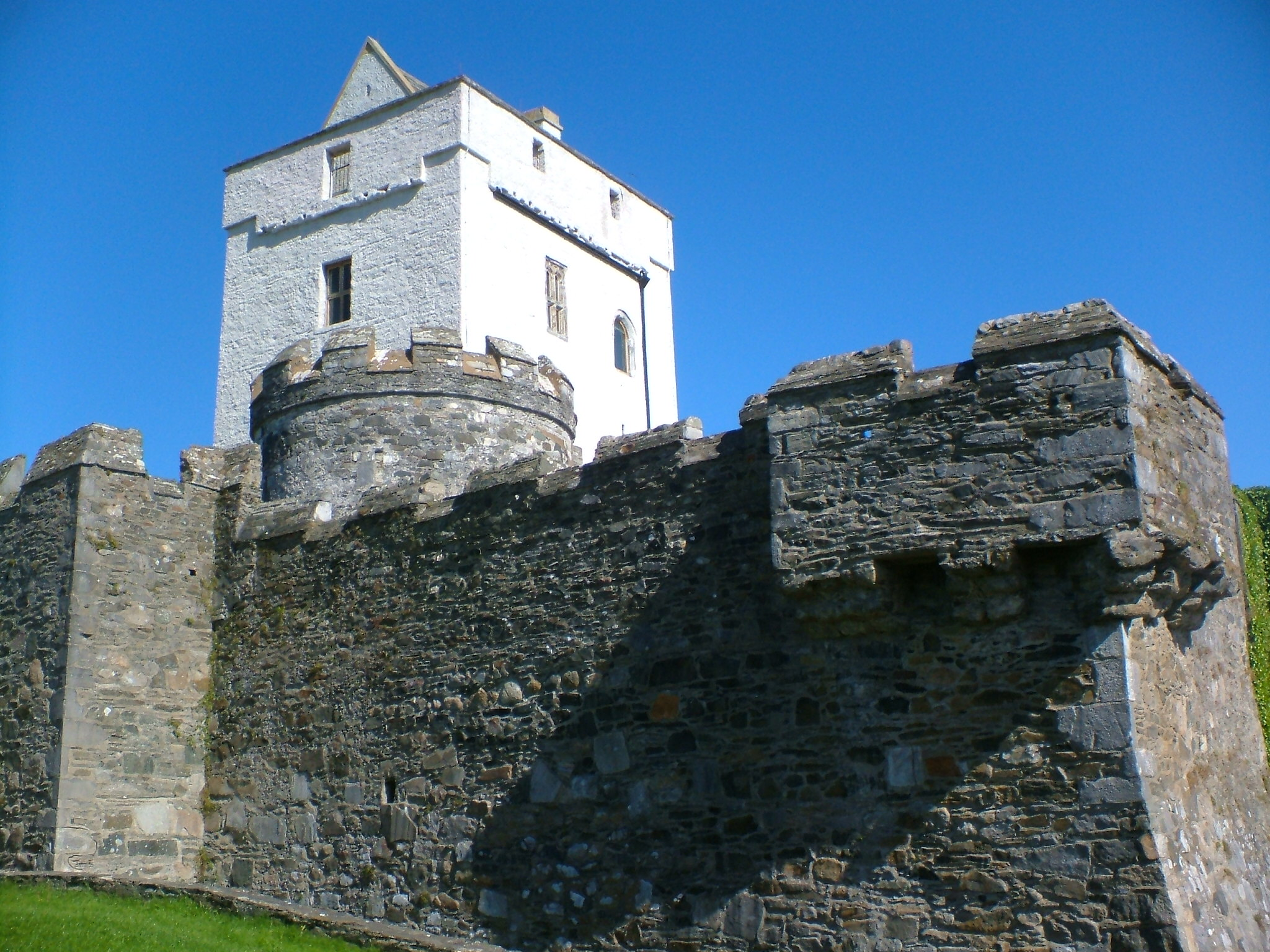
Castle Doe, Barmkin and Keep.

Na Trí Tuatha or Tuatha Toraighe, which was an area west of Fanad (modern day parishes of Gweedore and Tory Island), was controlled by the Ó Baegill until just after 1360, when it was conquered by Clann tSuibhne (Clan Sweeney).

Donnchadh Mór, who was son of Murchad Óc, and grandson of Murchad Mear, was the first Suibhne na d'Tuath. Donnchadh's father and grandfather had conquered large tracts of land in Tír Conaill in about 1314. In 1359 when Ó Conchobhair defeated Séan Ó Domhnaill, Donnchadh Mór's son, Eoghan Connachtach, was held captive by the son of Ó Conchobhair Shligigh. Later Eoghan was able to help Séan Ó Domhnaill defeat Toirdhealbhach an Fhíona Ó Domhnaill in battle, at Sliabh Malair. Eoghan died as they plundered Glencolumkille "as a result of his violating the monastery there".

According to the Book of Ballymote, Eoghan's son, Toirdealbhach Óg was lord of Na Tuatha. Another of Eoghan's sons drowned in 1413.

Little more is known of Mac Suibhne na d'Tuath until the middle of the 16th century.

In 1543 MacSuibhne na d'Tuath and his brother, Brian, were held as prisoners at Inis Mhic an Doirn (Ruthland Island, parish of Templecrone). By 1545 MacSuibhne na d'Tuath had died the lordship was taken over by his son, Eoghan Óg, who was killed fighting in 1554 at Ceann Salach (in Cloghaneely). The lordship then passed to his son, Murchadh Mall, who in 1567 aided Sir Aodh Ó Domhnaill defeat Séan an Díomuis Ó Néill, in battle, near Letterkenny. Murchadh Mall and Mac Suibhne Fánad (Toirdealbhach Óg) were killed in 1570 by Clann Domhnaill Gallóglaigh, at Dun na Long near Strabane.

After his death, Murchadh, was succeeded by his brother, Eoghan Óg. In 1588 the English were concerned that Eoghan Óg was aiding stranded Spaniards from the Armada. In 1590 Eoghan Óg gave protection to Brian Ó Ruairc of Breifne, after Ó Ruairc's defeat at the hands of the English. In 1592 Eoghan Óg attended the inauguration of Aodh Ruadh Ó Domhnaill as lord of Tír Conaill. Eoghan Óg died in 1596 and was succeeded by, Maol Mhuire, a nephew (son of Murchadh Mall).

The last lord of Na Tuatha was Maol Mhuire.

In early 1598 Maol Mhuire took the side of the English against Aodh Ruadh Ó Domhnaill but was defeated and was consequently banished from his lands by Ó Domhnaill. In May 1600 Maol Mhuire was knighted for his support of the English, though later in the same year he had switched sides, sided with Ó Domhnaill, and was then captured by the English. Maol Mhuire was then held prisoner on a ship on the River Foyle, near Derry, but managed to escape with the aid of a prostitute.

Maol Mhuire's grandson, Colonel Maol Mhuire Mac Suibhne, was a leading rebel in the Irish Rebellion of 1641, who had his lands in Dunlewy (in the parish of Gweedore) held forfeit for his actions.

=== Mac Suibhne Boghaineach (Mac Sweeney Banagh) ===
Mac Sweeney Banagh, according to Leabhar Clainne Suibhne, were descended from Dubhghall Mac Suibhne, who received the lands of Tír Boghaine from his grandfather Murchadh Mear who died in ca.1320. Boghaine consisted of the modern barony of Banagh in south-west County Donegal and part of Boylagh.

There are contradictory sources for early history of Mac Suibhne Boghaineach. In the Book of Ballymote (c. 1400), six of Dubhghall's grandsons are said to belong to the Mac Suibhne of Connacht. The eldest of the grandsons, Toirdhealbhach was also listed as the High Constable of Connacht and was killed with two of his brothers, Donn Sléibhe and Donnchadh in 1397.

By the 16th century the Mac Suibhne Boghaineach was seated at Rahan Castle, (near Dunkineely in County Donegal). In 1524 Niall Mór mac Eoghain (Mac Suibhne Thíre Boghaine) died here, and who was described as "a constable of hardest hand." Also at Rahan, Niall Mór mac Eoghain's son Maol Mhuire Mór, lord of Banagh, was killed by another son, Niall Óg, in 1535.

Killybegs (Irish Gaelic: Na Cealla Beaga, meaning 'the small churches'), was also controlled by Mac Suibhne Boghaineach.

In 1513 Killybegs was plundered by Eoghan Ó Máille and the crews of three ships, who were, however, unable to return home to Connacht with their prisoners because of stormy weather. Though the leaders of Banagh were away in Ó Domhnaill's army at the time, a youth, called Brian Mac Suibhne, along with some shepherds and farmers, rescued the prisoners and slew Eoghan Ó Máille. Another raid was recorded in 1547, in which the Mac Suibhnes were able to drive off another landing at Rathlin O'Beirne.

In 1547 Niall Óg was killed at Badhbhdhún Nua by the sons of Maol Mhuire (the brother he slew in 1535). After this, Niall Óg, was succeeded by Toirdhealbhach Meirgeach Mac Suibhne. By 1550 Toirdhealbhach Meirgeach was killed at Baile Mhic Suibhne, by the Clann Coinneigéin. Ruaidhrí Ballach Mac Suibhne then requested to Maghnus Ó Domhnaill to be installed as lord of Banagh, but was refused. In retaliation, Ruaidhrí Ballach then plundered Killybegs. Ruaidhrí Ballach was killed by a Maol Mhuire, who then became the rightful lord.

In 1581 Maol Mhuire and his sons, Murchadh and Toirdhealbhach Meirgeach, and many kinsman were killed fighting under Aodh Ó Domhnaill, against Toirdhealbhach Luineach Ó Néill at Kiltole (near Raphoe).

The lordship then passed to a son of Maol Mhuire, Maol Mhuire Óg who was soon killed, in 1582, by a group of Scots who were present at a meeting near Lough Foyle between Ó Neill and Ó Domhnaill. The next lord was Brian Óg (a son of the Maol Mhuire killed in 1535). Brian Óg was then killed by Niall Meirgeach (son of Maol Mhuire who died in 1581). Niall Meirgeach, like those before him, didn't last long and was killed in 1588 at the island of Derryness in the barony of Boylagh, by Donnchadh (son of Maol Mhuire Meirgeach, who died in 1564).

In 1590 when Aodh Ruadh Ó Domhnaill (Red Hugh O'Donnell) was held in Dublin Castle, his half-brother, Domhnall Ó Domhnaill, attempted to wrest Tír Conaill from his father Aodh. Aodh Ruadh's mother, Iníon Dubh, in response mustered a large force of Scots and also the Mac Suibhne branches of Na Tuatha and Fanad to oppose Domhnall. During this time Donnchadh. lord of Banagh took Domhnall's side, along with Ó Baoighill. The opposing forces met at the Battle of Doire Leathan near Glencolumbkille, on 14 September 1590, and Domhnall's force was defeated. By 1592 Aodh Ruadh was in power of Tír Conaill and it seems as if Donnchadh was pardoned for opposing him, as Donnchadh was present at Aodh Ruadh's inauguration at Kilmacrenan.

In late 1601 Mac Suibhne's Castle was taken by the English, and then recaptured by Ó Domhnaill. In November Donnchadh submitted to Niall Garbh Ó Domhnaill, who was on the side of the English. In 1608 Donnchadh was part of the jury that indicted Ó Néill and Ruaidhí Ó Domhnaill, earl of Tírconnell, after they fled from Rathmullan in 1607.

During the era of the plantations in Ulster, Donnchadh was allotted 2,000 acres (8.1 km^{2}) in the barony of Kilmacrenan, Donegal. In 1641 Donnchadh's son, Niall Meirgeach, was killed in a skirmish near Killybegs by settlers who were under Andrew Knox.

== The chieftaincies of Fanad, Doe, and Banagh ==
- The chiefly line of Fanad (Mac Suibhne Fánad)

Historians maintain that the chiefly line of Fanad had disappeared before 1800.

- The chiefly line of Doe (Mac Suibhne na d'Tuath)

The chiefly line of Doe is thought to descend from the chiefly line of Fanad. Thomas A. Sweeney claims to be the senior male, directly descending from Maol Mhuire (Sir Myles Mac Sweeney, Chief of Doe, 1596-1630). In 1999 Sweeney petitioned the Office of the Chief Herald of Ireland to be recognized as Chief of the Name of the Mac Sweeneys of Doe. In July 2003, in light of the MacCarthy Mór Scandal, the Genealogical Office discontinued the practice of recognising Chiefs, with Sweeneys petition still pending investigation.

- The chiefly line of Banagh (Mac Suibhne Boghaineach)

Folk tradition of south County Donegal maintains that the last two male descendants of the chiefly line died in Teelin near the end of the nineteenth century.

== See also ==
- Alexander McSween
- Irish clans
- Leabhar Clainne Suibhne
