= Leabhar Clainne Suibhne =

16th century Irish manuscript

Leabhar Chlainne Suibhne ("The Book of Clan Sweeney") is a 16th-century Donegal manuscript written in Irish. While there is a substantial amount of religious material, it is principally interesting for containing a historical tract concerning the Clan Suibhne (the McSweeneys). It is now held in the library of the Royal Irish Academy as MS No. 475.

== The Text ==
The manuscript is composed of three sections:

=== The Book of Piety ===
This section was written by Ciothruadh Mág Fhionngoill of Tory Island, County Donegal, in 1513–14, for Máire Ní Mháille, wife of Ruaidhrí Mac Suibhne Fanad. It includes devotional material well known in late medieval Europe, such as Gospel of Nicodemus, a life of the Virgin Mary and the finding of the True Cross by Saint Helena. The content of this portion has much in common with the manuscript Liber Flavus Fergusiorum.

Other material dealt with Sunday observance; the fourteen benefits of the Mass; the conditions necessary for confession, and a variety of moral tales and snippets of spiritual advice. The text also contains stories the lives of major Irish saints, Saint Patrick and Columba, female saints such as Saint Margaret and Catherine, and notes on St Patrick's Purgatory in County Donegal. While the language of the manuscript is Irish, the contents are typical of European devotional literature of the period.

=== The History of the McSweeneys of Fanad ===
This section was written by Tadhg Mac Fithil.

=== The Poems ===
The final section of the manuscript includes twenty-four poems dedicated to three different chiefs of the family, including elegy on Ruaidhrí Mac Suibhne (d.1518) as well as poems praising Toirdhealbhach Mac Suibhne and his brother Domhnall.

== See also ==
- Irish annals

== Sources ==
- Oxford Concise Companion to Irish Literature, Robert Welsh, 1996. ISBN 0-19-280080-9
