= Murchadh Mac Suibhne =

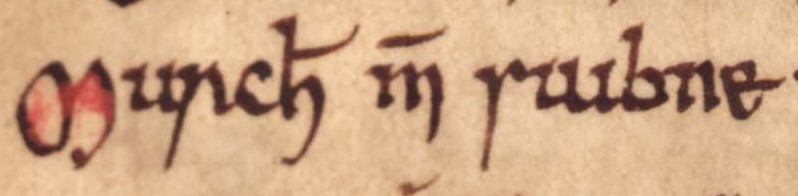
- Murchadh's name as it appears on folio 68v of Oxford Bodleian Library Rawlinson B 489 (the Annals of Ulster).
- Died: 1267
- Noble family: Clann Suibhne
- Issue: Maol Mhuire an Sparáin
- Father: Maol Mhuire mac Suibhne

Murchadh Mac Suibhne (died 1267) was a leading member of Clann Suibhne. (Note: Since the 1980s, academics have accorded Murchadh various personal names in English secondary sources: Margadr, Margaðr, Margradr, Murchad, Murchadh, and Murchaid. Since the 1980s, academics have accorded Murchadh various patronyms names in English secondary sources: Murchad Mac Suibne, Murchad MacSween, Murchadh Mac Shuibhne, Murchadh Mac Suibhne, Murchadh MacSween, Murchadh Macsween, and Murchaid MacSween.) He was a grandson of the family's eponymous ancestor Suibhne mac Duinn Shléibhe, and a nephew of the family's mid-thirteenth-century representative, Dubhghall mac Suibhne.

During the latter's career, the Scottish Crown sought to extend royal authority into Argyll and the Isles. In the course of this westward drive, Clann Suibhne fell prey to the Stewarts, one of Scotland's most powerful and families. Charter evidence dating to the early 1260s reveals that Dubhghall resigned the Clann Suibhne lordship into the hands of Walter Stewart, Earl of Menteith. Whether this transfer was the result of a military operation against Clann Suibhne is unknown.

The fact that some members of Clann Suibhne were unwilling to subject themselves to Stewart domination is evinced by the record of Murchadh supporting the cause of Hákon Hákonarson, King of Norway, who led a retaliatory campaign to reassert Norwegian authority in 1263. Murchadh played a prominent part in this campaign. He was amongst the Islesmen commanded a detachment of Hákon's fleet into Loch Lomond, where they devastated the Lennox district. Upon the close of the campaign, Murchadh was rewarded the lordship of Arran for his services.

Unfortunately for Murchadh and his family, Scottish power remained unbroken after Hákon withdrew from the region. Scottish forces are reported to have led retaliatory campaigns into the Isles the following year. As such, Murchadh appears to have had little choice but to submit to the Scots. A son of his is certainly recorded to have been kept as a royal hostage.

Although Clann Suibhne's lordship in Argyll appears to have ended by the 1260s, the family was evidently closely associated with the Uí Domhnaill kindred in Ireland. Later generations of Clann Suibhne chieftains certainly commanded gallowglass warriors on behalf of the Uí Domhnaill and other Irish families. Murchadh himself may have met his end pursuing such a career, as he is reported to have died a prisoner of Walter de Burgh, Earl of Ulster in 1267, having been taken prisoner in Connacht.

== Ancestry ==
Simplified pedigree of the Clann Suibhne illustrating Murchadh's place in the kindred.

Suibhne
Dubhghall	Maol Mhuire
Murchadh	Donn Sléibhe
Maol Mhuire an Sparáin
Suibhne	Murchadh Mear

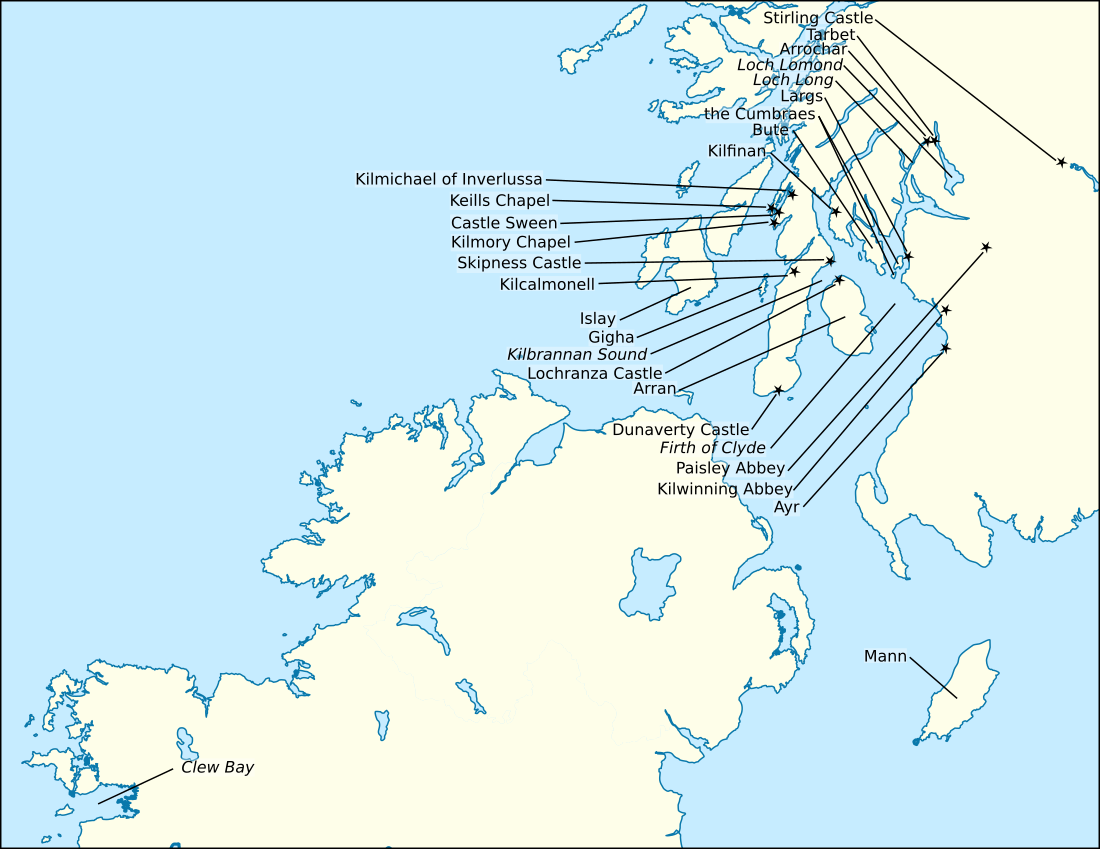
Locations relating to the life and times of Murchadh.

Murchadh was a son of Maol Mhuire mac Suibhne. The latter's father was Suibhne mac Duinn Shléibhe, eponymous ancestor of Clann Suibhne.

According to the sixteenth-century Leabhar Clainne Suibhne, Murchadh bore the epithet Mear ("the mad"). If this source is to be believed, his father bore the epithet an Sparáin ("the purse"), and was married to Bean Mhídhe, daughter of Toirdhealbhach Ó Conchobhair.

There is reason to suspect that these claims are nevertheless erroneous. The earliest source to outline Clann Suibhne's descent is the fourteenth-century Book of Ballymote, which appears to show that Leabhar Clainne Suibhne has omitted two generations, merging Murchadh and his father with a like-named son and grandson.

Various Irish annals, such as the fifteenth- to sixteenth-century Annals of Connacht, record that a member of Clann Suibhne named Maol Mhuire was married to Bean Mhídhe, daughter of Toirdhealbhach, son of Ruaidhrí Ó Conchobhair, King of Connacht. (Note: Other annals noting this marriage include the sixteenth-century Annals of Loch Cé, and the seventeenth-century Annals of the Four Masters. This marital alliance may have meant that the Uí Conchobhair sought to employ the military resources of Clann Suibhne.) The fact that this source specifically identifies Bean Mhídhe as "the wife" of her husband, in an annal entry outlining her death in 1269, suggests that her husband was still alive at the time. This in turn suggests that the annal entry refers to the wife of Murchadh's son; and that the epithets an Sparáin and Mear are those of Murchadh's son and grandson. (Note: The Clann Suibhne pedigrees preserved by both the Book of Ballymote and the fifteenth-century Book of Lecan state that Murchadh's grandson indeed bore the epithet Mear.)

== Scottish encroachment in Argyll ==
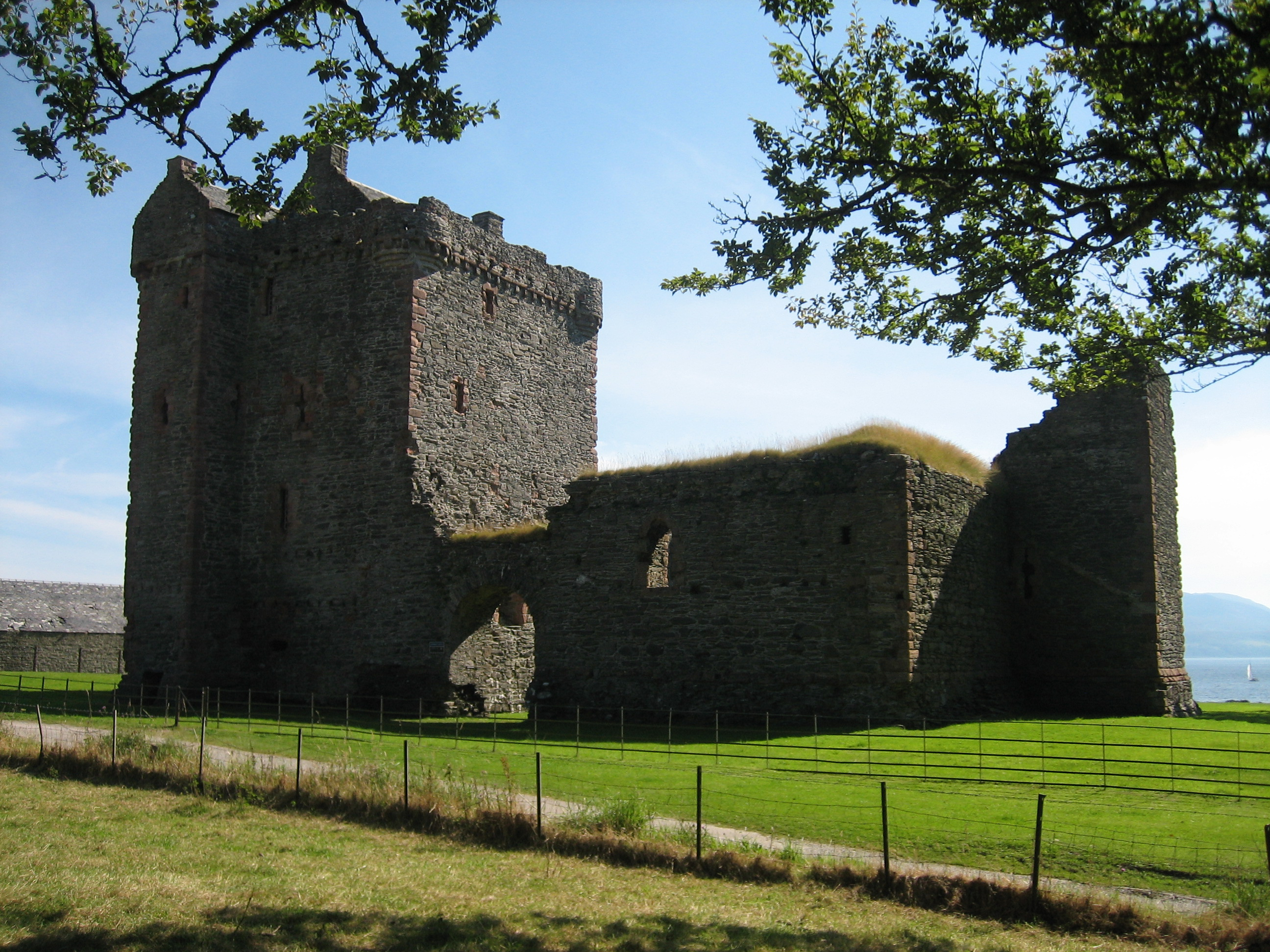
Now-ruinous Skipness Castle may have been constructed by Murchadh's uncle, Dubhghall mac Suibhne. The fortress is first attested in 1261 by a charter that describes Dubhghall as the castle's lord. Murchadh is listed as one of the charter witnesses.

During the reign of Alexander II, King of Scotland, the Scots extended royal authority into Argyll and the Isles. In the early 1260s, about a decade after Alexander II's death, his son and royal successor, Alexander III, came of age and took steps to continue his father's westward expansion. As with the previous reign, it was the Stewart family, this time in the person of Walter Stewart, Earl of Menteith, who spearheaded the campaign. Evidence of this push is preserved by the record of Clann Suibhne possessions being granted away in the early 1260s. (Note: Walter Stewart was the first member of Stewart family to adopt a form of the surname Stewart despite not possessing the office of steward. He married a member of the comital kindred of Menteith, and was afterwards granted the earldom by Alexander III. Walter Stewart and his wife, Mary, gained a right to the earldom by the early 1260s. Walter Stewart was Sheriff of Ayr by 1264, and became Sheriff of Dumbarton sometime between 1271 and 1278. In time, members of this family adopted the surname Menteith.)

For example, on 17 April 1261, Dubhghall, with the consent of his heir Eóin, granted the church of St Colmán Ela (Kilcalmonell) to Paisley Abbey, along with the chapel of St Columba near Skipness Castle. Furthermore, a charter of Walter Stewart to Paisley Abbey, dating to 19 January 1262, confirms Dubhghall's grant to the abbey, and states that Dubhghall had earlier granted the lands of Skipness to Walter Stewart himself. Dubhghall is listed as one of witnesses of the transaction. Other attested witnesses were Murchadh, and Murchadh's brother, Donn Sléibhe.

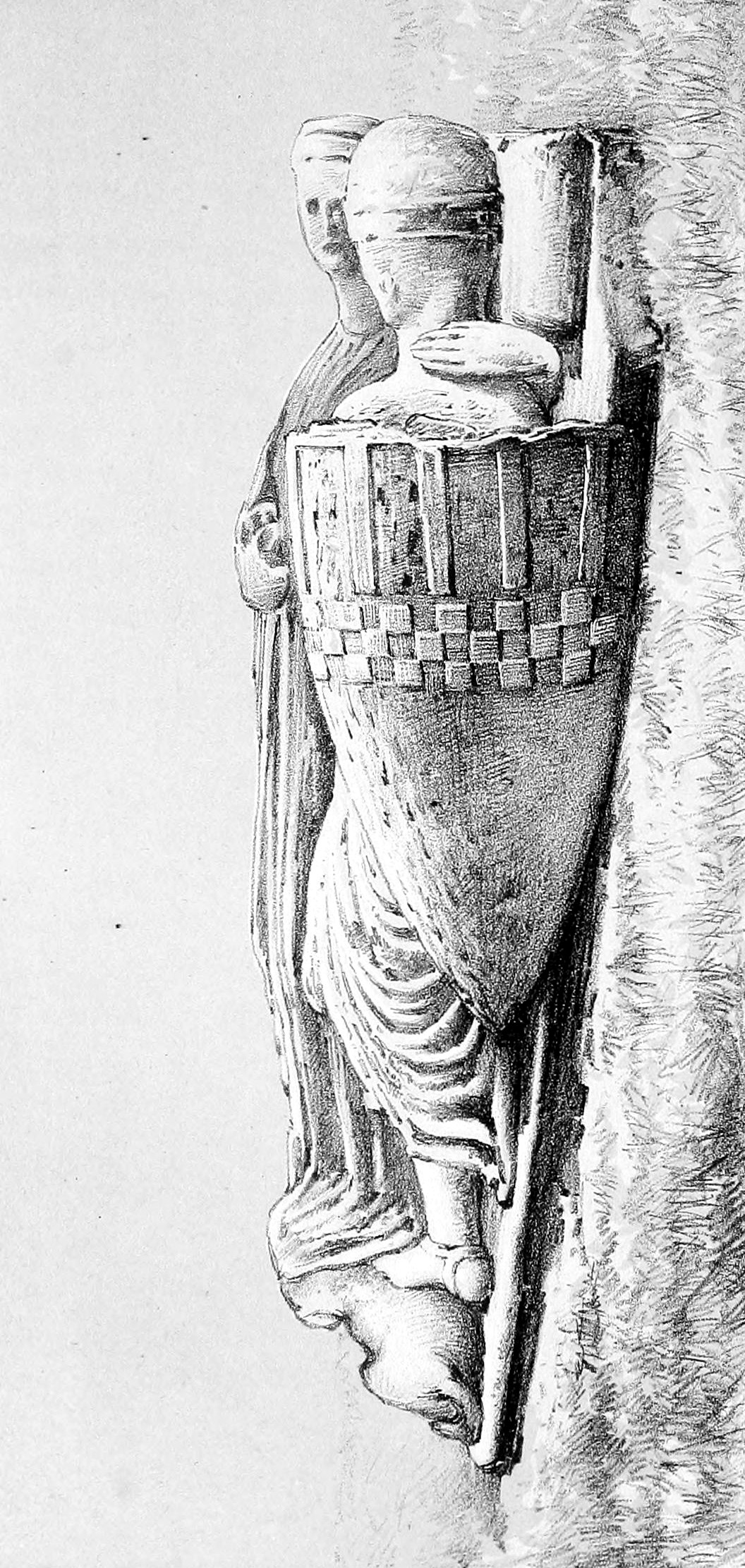
The effigy of Walter Stewart, Earl of Menteith and his wife, Mary I, Countess of Menteith. It is the earliest effigy of a married couple, side by side on the same tomb, in the British Isles.

Dubhghall is elsewhere stated to have granted Walter Stewart his lands to be held as a "free barony" for two-thirds of a knight's service in the king's army. Additional evidence of the Stewarts' takeover of the Clann Suibhne heartland includes the record of grants of Walter Stewart of several Knapdale churches—those of St Abbán moccu Corbmaic (Keills Chapel), St Michael (Kilmichael of Inverlussa), and St Mary/St Máel Ruba (Kilmory Chapel)—to Kilwinning Abbey. (Note: Moreover, an act of parliament of 1293 makes note of "the Earl of Menteith's land in Knapdale".)

The circumstances surrounding of Dubhghall's contract with Walter Stewart are unclear. There are no other records regarding the allotment of Clann Suibhne lands during this period, and it is not known if the Stewarts or their allies had already established themselves in Knapdale. The transactions involving Clann Suibhne reveal that the family was progressively deprived of its territories. Whether the charters are evidence of a military invasion is unknown. The creation of a Stewart lordship in the region may have been undertaken in the context of extending Scottish royal authority into Argyll and the Isles. From the perspective of both the Stewarts and the Scottish Crown, Clann Suibhne seems to have represented a significant threat to regional stability. The removal or destruction of such families appears to represent part of a strategy to not only dislodge unpalatable kindreds (like Clann Suibhne), but forge new partnerships with more loyal kindreds, and extend the power of committed agents of the Scottish Crown (like the Stewarts).

== Norwegian campaign ==
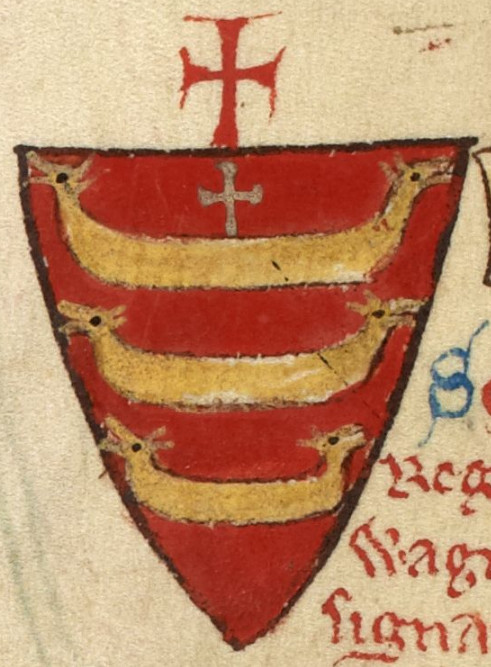
The coat of arms of Hákon Hákonarson as depicted on folio 150r of British Library Royal 14 C VII (Historia Anglorum). (Note: The thirteenth-century Historia Anglorum is preserved by only one manuscript. The majority of the text and illustrations in this composition are the work of Matthew Paris, a man who met Hákon in 1248/1249, the year after the king's coronation. The emphasise that Matthew placed upon the Norwegian realm's sea power appears to be underscored in the heraldry he attributed to Hákon.)

Whilst Alexander II projected Scottish royal power into the south-west Highlands, Alexander III focused his effort upon the Isles. In 1262, the year after yet another failed attempt by the Scottish Crown to purchase the Isles from Hákon Hákonarson, King of Norway, the thirteenth-century Hákonar saga Hákonarsonar states that Hákon was alerted that his Scottish counterpart sought the subjugation of the Isles, and was informed of recent Scottish aggression in the region, including a particularly savage attack upon the inhabitants of Skye. Thus provoked, Hákon assembled an enormous fleet—described by the Icelandic annals as the largest force to have ever set sail from Norway—to reassert Norwegian sovereignty along the north and west coasts of Scotland. (Note: Specifically, Hákonar saga Hákonarsonar states that Hákon intended to "avenge the warfare that the Scots had made in his dominions".) The fact that members of Clann Suibhne were unwilling to subject themselves to Stewart domination is evidenced by the record of Murchadh supporting the Norwegian cause.

In July 1263, the armada disembarked from Norway, and by mid August, Hákon reaffirmed his overlordship in Shetland and Orkney, forced the submission of Caithness, and arrived in the Hebrides. According to the saga, Hákon was met in the region by Magnús Óláfsson, King of Mann and the Isles and Dubhghall mac Ruaidhrí. As the fleet made its way southwards, Hákon sent a detachment of vessels under the command of Dubhghall and Magnús Óláfsson to harry Kintyre whilst Hákon himself made landfall on Gigha.

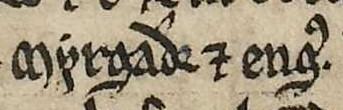
The names of Murchadh and Aonghus Mór mac Domhnaill as they appear on folio 122r of AM 45 fol (Codex Frisianus): "Myrgaðr ok Engus".

It is evident that Magnús and Dubhghall were tasked with bringing Aonghus Mór Mac Domhnaill and Murchadh onto the king's side. The saga, and pieces of poetry embedded within it, glorifies the subsequent ravaging of Kintyre, suggesting that it was this rapaciousness that finally compelled Aonghus Mór and Murchadh to come into the king's peace. Certainly the saga reveals that these west-coast magnates duly submitted to Hákon, swearing oaths of allegiance, surrendering hostages into his keeping, and delivering the island of Islay into his control. The king is further said to have levied a tax of one thousand head of cattle upon the Kintyre headland, and a particular fortress—most likely Dunaverty Castle—is stated to have been surrendered to Hákon by an unidentified knight.

The flight-shy ring-users of the swayer of the din of spears pulled the boats along the broad beach-paths. The fearless war-men of honour devastated the islands in the widely inhabited lake with spear-winds.

— excerpt from Hrafnsmál, by Sturla Þórðarson, extolling the devastation of the Lennox by a detachment of Islesmen including Murchadh himself.

In early September, the reinforced fleet of Norwegians and Islesmen entered the Firth of Clyde. Although Hákonar saga Hákonarsonar states that the Norwegian and Scottish envoys attempted to negotiate a peace between the realms, the Scottish king was unwilling to concede a claim to the islands of the Clyde: specifically Bute, Arran, and the Cumbraes. After peace talks broke down, the saga identifies Magnús Óláfsson, Dubhghall, Ailéan, Aonghus Mór, and Murchadh, as the commanders of a detachment of Islesmen and Norwegians who entered Loch Long, portaged across land into Loch Lomond, and ravaged the surrounding region of the Lennox. (Note: The saga reveals that the fleet portaged the approximately a 2.5 kilometres (1.6 mi) distance between Arrochar to Tarbet. Although the placename Tarbet is variously stated to mean as "place of portage", this claim may be influenced by the saga's account of the expedition, and the place name actually means "isthmus".) According various versions of the saga, this contingent consisted of either forty or sixty ships—a considerable portion of Hákon's fleet. There is reason to suspect that this strike is evidence that the Norwegians and Islesmen were directing their fury at the territories of the Stewarts. The contested islands of the Clyde were almost certainly possessions of the Stewarts at the time. Furthermore, by penetrating into the Earldom of Lennox, and possibly striking further east inland, Hákon's adherents would have been encroaching into the Earldom of Menteith. (Note: The Stewarts and the comital family of Lennox were allied in marriage, as Maol Domhnaich, Earl of Lennox was married to Walter Stewart's sister, Elizabeth.) Military actions conducted by Ailéan are specifically acclaimed by the saga, which states that he took several hundred head of cattle, and caused much destruction throughout Scotland. This inland campaigning appears to be corroborated by Scottish exchequer records, as John Lamberton, Sheriff of Stirling is reported to have incurred expenses for the upkeep of "vigilant men" at Stirling Castle for the time when the Norwegian forces were in the area.

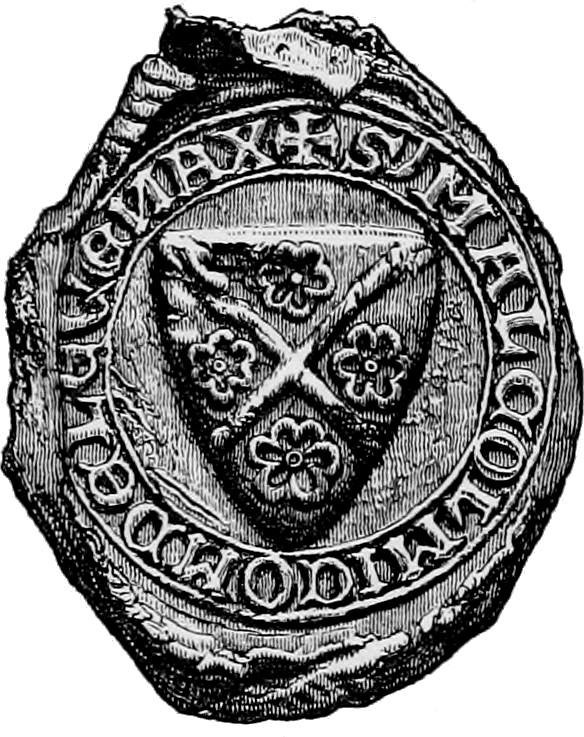
The seal of Maol Domhnaich, Earl of Lennox, brother-in-law of Walter Stewart.

Meanwhile, at the beginning of October, Hákon's main force clashed with the Scots at Largs, and withdrew into the Hebrides. Once regrouped with the detachment of Islesmen and Norwegians, the saga records that Hákon rewarded his overseas supporters. Whilst Dubhghall and Ailéan were awarded the forfeited island territories of Eóghan Mac Dubhghaill, a certain Ruðri received Bute, and Murchadh was granted Arran. (Note: Whilst the Stewarts appear to have come into possession of Arran at some point in the thirteenth century, there is reason to suspect that the family could have contended with the Bisset kindred for control of the island. Certainly, Walter Bisset is reported to have died on the island in 1251. There is no further evidence of Bisset authority on Arran until 1298, when a certain Thomas Bisset is stated to have arrived there from Ireland. It is possible that the Bissets gained the island at about the same time that Walter Bisset seized control of Dunaverty Castle in 1248. The Bissets may have lost control of both the castle and the island with Walter Bisset's death.)

Although the saga declares that the Norwegian campaign was an overwhelming triumph, it seems to have been an utter failure instead. Not only did Hákon fail to break Scottish power, but Alexander III seized the initiative the following year, and oversaw a series of invasions into the Isles and northern Scotland. Recognising this dramatic shift in royal authority, Magnús Óláfsson submitted to Alexander III within the year, and in so doing, symbolised the complete collapse of Norwegian sovereignty in the Isles. Almost three years after Hákon's abortive campaign, terms of peace were finally agreed upon between the Scottish and Norwegian administrations. Specifically, with the conclusion of the Treaty of Perth in 1266, Hákon's son and successor, Magnús Hákonarson, King of Norway, formally resigned all rights to Mann and the islands on the western coast of Scotland. The territorial dispute over Scotland's western maritime region was finally settled.

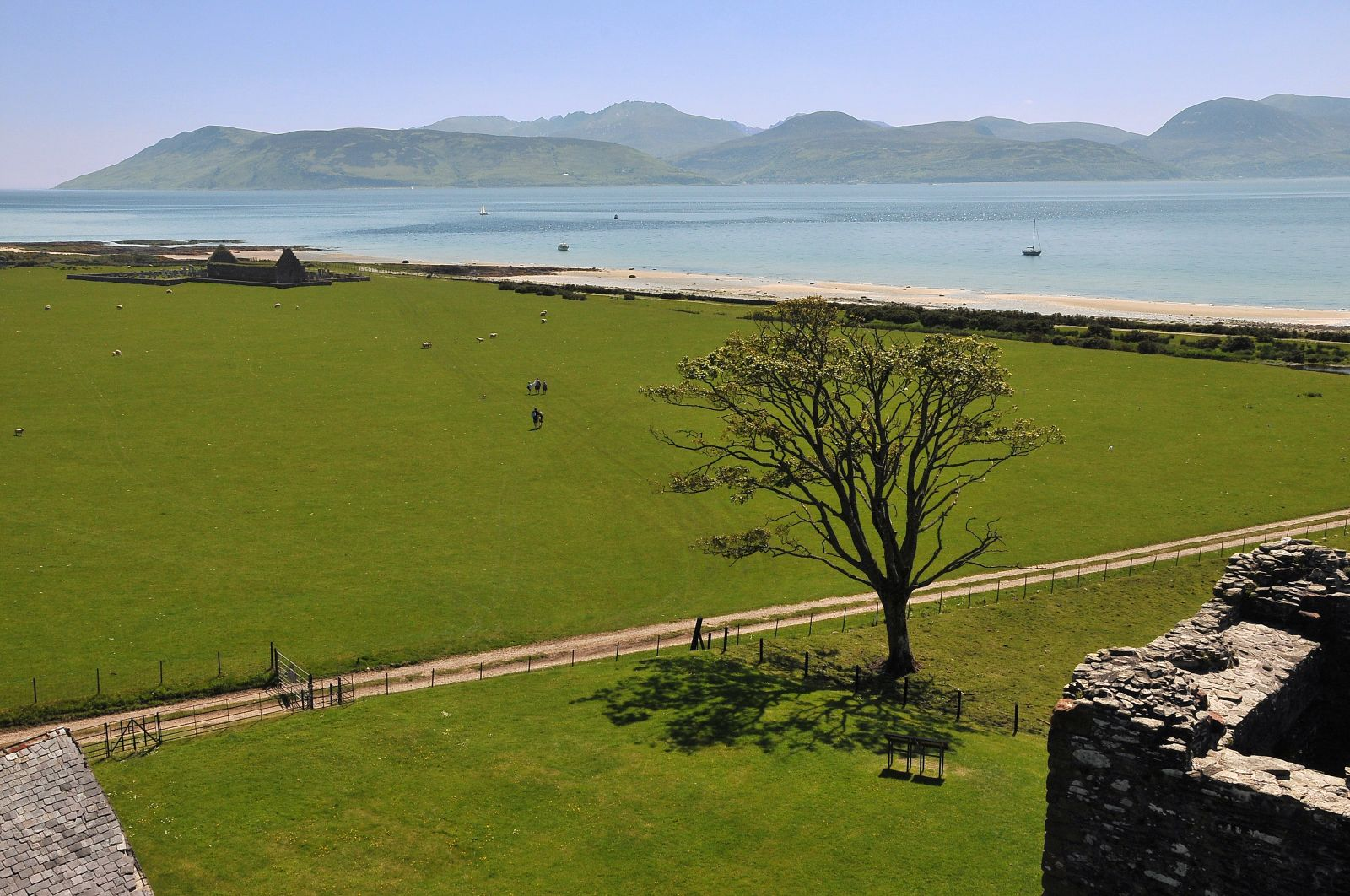
The view from the ruins of Skipness Castle in Kintyre, across the Kilbrannan Sound, towards Arran. In 1263, Hákon granted Murchadh the island for his service to the Norwegian Crown. The castle across the sound from Skipness, Lochranza Castle, may have been built by Dubhghall.

As a result of this evaporation of Norwegian sovereignty, there is reason to suspect that families like Clann Suibhne were increasingly venerable to retaliation at the hands of the Scottish Crown. The Scots' retaliatory campaign against the Islesmen was evidently commanded by Alexander Comyn, Earl of Buchan, Uilleam, Earl of Mar, and Alan Hostarius. According to the fourteenth-century Gesta annalia II, and the fifteenth-century Scotichronicon, it was these magnates who oversaw the Scots' ravaging of the islands. These sources are corroborated by the thirteenth-century Magnúss saga lagabœtis, which states that Scottish forces invaded the Isles in the summer after Hákon's campaign, and forced the submission of Aonghus Mór and other adherents to the Norwegian cause. Evidence from the Scottish exchequer, concerning Uilleam's reception of monetary aid for commanding two hundred serjeants on behalf of the king in the Hebrides, also validates these accounts. Further evidence of a concerted campaign against Hákon's supporters is the record of Walter Stewart assembling a royal fleet at Ayr, and of Uilleam taking twenty head of cattle from Kintyre. (Note: Moreover, a certain Gilaverianus, the royal farmer of the Cumbraes, is recorded to have been fined eighty head of cattle, and to have had his son held a royal hostage by Walter Stewart to ensure payment.)

In the wake of the Norwegian withdrawal, and the violent extension of Scottish royal authority into the Isles, Aonghus Mór and Murchadh had no choice but to submit to the Scots, and were forced to hand over their sons for their good behaviour. As for Murchadh, the welfare of his son is recorded to have been the responsibility of Robert Mowat, Sheriff of Forfar. It appears that Clann Suibhne's power in Knapdale and Kintyre came to an end in the 1260s, with the family being replaced by the Stewarts. The transition of power certainly seems to have marked an increase in Scottish authority in Argyll, and may have been a factor in Eóghan's remarkable refusal to assist Hákon against the Scottish Crown.

== Irish coalition and relocation ==
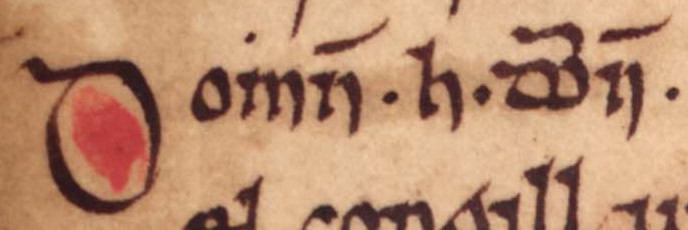
The name of Domhnall Óg Ó Domhnaill as it appears on folio 68r of Oxford Bodleian Library Rawlinson B 489. There is evidence indicating that Domhnall Óg was fostered by Clann Suibhne, and married a member of the family.

In time, Clann Suibhne established itself as one of the preeminent professional military families in Ireland. Although the clan may have supplied gallowglass warriors to Ireland before its dispossession, Clann Suibhne appears to have become increasingly active in Irish affairs after its displacement. In fact, it may have been at about the time of the family's supplantment in Scotland that it relocated to Ireland. Certainly, the earliest notice of the clan by the Irish annals is the record of Murchadh's death in 1267, as a prisoner of the Walter de Burgh, Earl of Ulster.

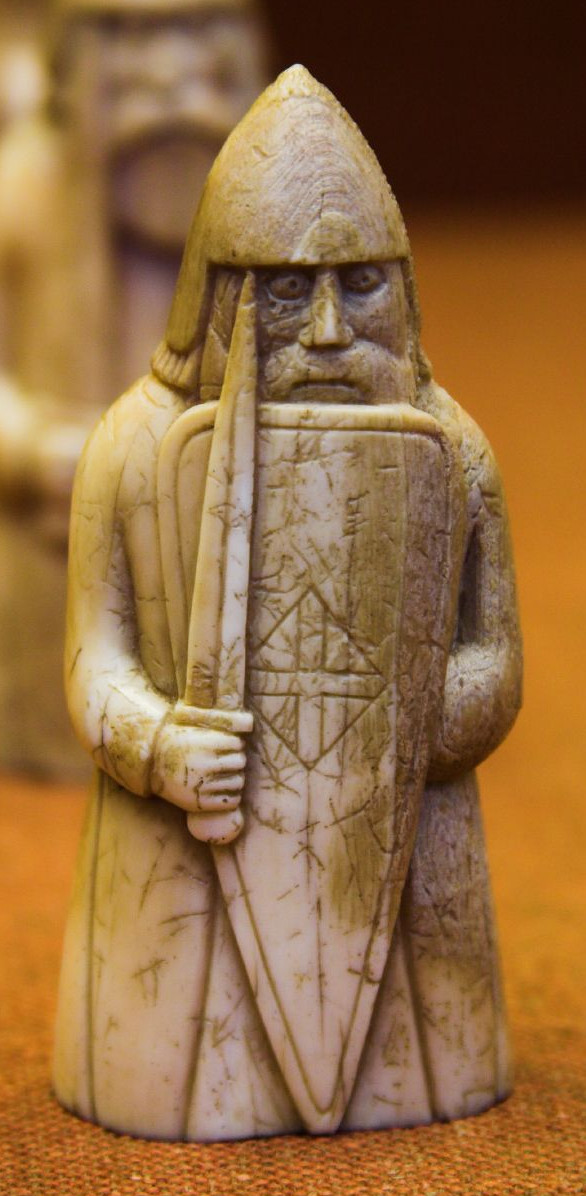
A rook gaming piece of the Lewis chessmen. (Note: Comprising some four sets, the pieces are thought to have been crafted in Norway in the twelfth- and thirteenth centuries. They were uncovered in Lewis in the early nineteenth century. The Scandinavian connections of leading members of the Isles may have been reflected in their military armament, and could have resembled that depicted upon such gaming pieces.)

Murchadh's demise is reported by various sources: such as the Annals of Connacht, the Annals of the Four Masters, the Annals of Loch Cé, and the Annals of Ulster. These accounts locate his capture in the Owles, a territory around Clew Bay, and state that he was handed over to the earl by the local lord, Domhnall Iorrius mac Maghnusa Ó Conchobhair, a man otherwise known to have been closely aligned with the English in Ireland. The annal entries could be evidence that Walter de Burgh was opposed to Clann Suibhne's settlement in Ireland. As such, he may have expedited the process of the kindred's ejection from Argyll–intentionally or not. (Note: Domhnall Iorrius was chief of the Clann Muircheartaigh branch of the Uí Conchobhair.)

A particular piece of contemporary Gaelic poetry, composed by Giolla Brighde Mac Con Midhe, appears to reveal that Clann Suibhne was closely allied with the Uí Domhnaill. Specifically, the Uí Domhnaill chief Domhnall Óg Ó Domhnaill, King of Tír Chonaill is stated to have been fostered by Clann Suibhne. A somewhat dubious annal entry preserved by the seventeenth-century Annals of the Four Masters further evinces Domhnall Óg's overseas upbringing, by relating that he succeeded his brother in 1258, after returning to Ireland from Scotland, speaking a Scottish dialect of Gaelic. As such, it was partly the military might of Domhnall Óg's foster-father that enabled Domhnall Óg to succeed his brother at the age of seventeen.

It is possible that Domhnall Óg provided a safe haven for the displaced Clann Suibhne. Murchadh's capture could have been associated with otherwise unrecorded piratical activity or gallowglass operations. There is reason to suspect that a coalition between Clann Suibhne and the Uí Domhnaill was a factor in the Scottish Crown's allowance of Clann Suibhne's dispossession in the 1260s. Such an alliance could have posed a threat to Alexander III's ambitions of extending Scottish royal authority westward. (Note: Domhnall Óg was evidently allied in marriage with Clann Suibhne. According to the sixteenth-century pedigrees of the Uí Domhnaill, a daughter of a certain Mac Suibhne was the mother of Domhnall Óg's son, Aodh, a man who succeeded as King of Tír Chonaill in 1281.) In fact, the king's fears appear to be exemplified by the record of Scottish envoys requesting that Henry III, King of England cease lending support to Magnús Óláfsson. As with Clann Suibhne, Magnús became a target of Scottish aggression in the 1260s, and appears to have earlier formed a pact with a powerful Irish family to strengthen his position.

== See also ==
- Eóin Mac Suibhne, a fourteenth-century descendant of Murchadh who attempted to retake the Clann Suibhne ancestral lands in Argyll
