= Eilean Loain =

Island in Argyll and Bute, Scotland

Eilean Loain (Gaelic)
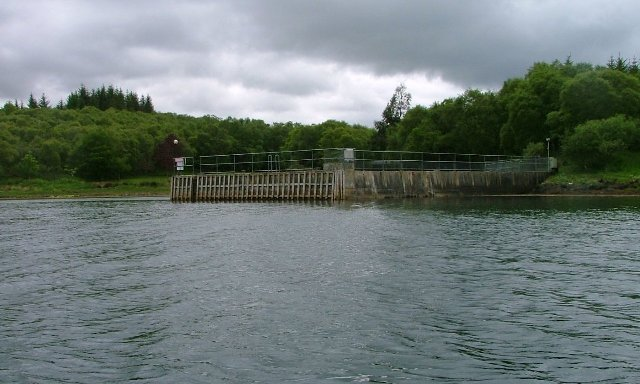
- The jetty

Location
- Eilean Loain shown within Argyll and Bute
- OS grid reference: NR755854
- Coordinates: 56.009°N 5.602°W

Name
- Name meaning: pack of hounds isle

Physical geography
- Island group: Islay
- Area: c. 15 ha (37 acres)
- Highest elevation: 28 m (92 ft)

Administration
- Council area: Argyll and Bute
- Country: Scotland
- Sovereign state: United Kingdom

Demographics
- Population: 2
- Population rank: 88=

Eilean Loain is a small island in Loch Sween and one of the Inner Hebrides of Scotland.

It is about 2 kilometres (1 mi) west of the settlement of Kilmichael of Inverlussa in Knapdale and a similar distance southeast of the village of Tayvallich on the other side of the loch. It is attended by the islet of Cala that lies to the north west.

Eilean Loain has a substantial jetty on the north shore and a large building nearby. It was described as "inhabited" by Haswell-Smith in 2004 and Argyll and Bute Council records indicate the presence of a dwelling house. According to the National Records of Scotland census information the island is "included in the NRS statistical geography for inhabited islands but had no usual residents at the time of either the 2001 or 2011 censuses". However, in 2022 the census recorded a resident population of two.

Eilean Loain is part of the Knapdale National Scenic Area, one of 40 in Scotland.
