= Kilmory =

Kilmory may refer to the following places in Scotland:

- Kilmory, Knapdale, a hamlet in Knapdale, Scotland
  - Kilmory Knap Chapel, an ancient ruined chapel at Kilmory Knap
- Kilmory, Ardnamurchan, a hamlet in Highland, Scotland
- Kilmory, Rùm, an uninhabited village on the island of Rùm, Highland, Scotland
- Kilmory, Arran, a village on the Isle of Arran, North Ayrshire, Scotland
- Kilmory Camanachd, a shinty team based in Lochgilphead
- Kilmory Castle, a historic house and gardens near Lochgilphead, Argyll, Scotland
