= Eilean Mòr, MacCormaig Isles =

Island in Argyll and Bute, Scotland

Eilean Mòr
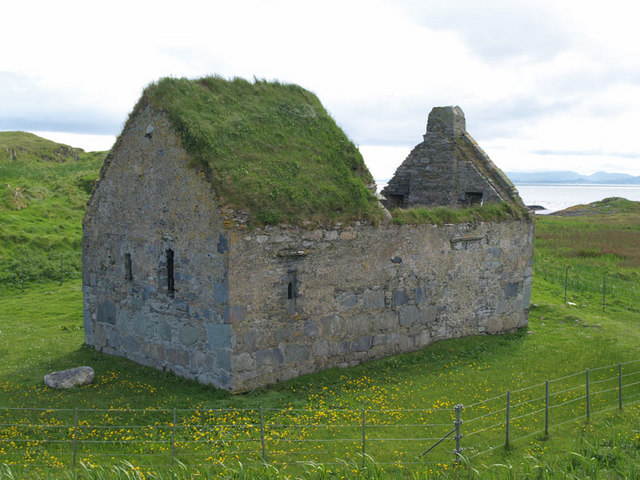
- St Cormac's Chapel

Location
- Eilean Mòr shown within Argyll and Bute
- OS grid reference: NR666753
- Coordinates: 55.914477°N 5.735721°W

Name
- Name meaning: Big isle

Physical geography
- Island group: MacCormaig Isles
- Area: 18 hectares (0.07 sq mi)
- Highest elevation: 21 metres (69 ft)

Administration
- Council area: Argyll and Bute
- Country: Scotland
- Sovereign state: United Kingdom

Demographics
- Population: 0
- Population rank: 1.75

Eilean Mòr ("Big Isle") is one of the MacCormaig Isles situated near the entrance to Loch Sween in the Sound of Jura, Argyll and Bute, Scotland. Eilean Mòr is uninhabited.

Eilean Mòr is the largest of the MacCormaig Islands, and is a breeding ground for seabirds. The island is the legendary retreat of the 7th-century Saint Cormac. It has three ancient monuments on it in the care of Historic Environment Scotland: a cave, a chapel and a cross. The island was bequeathed to the Scottish National Party in 1978, and it has been managed since 2000 by a charitable trust.

== St Cormac's Cave ==
St Cormac's Cave is on the south end of the island. The cave is around 3 metres (10 feet) long, 1 metre (3 feet) wide and 2 metres (6 feet) high, and contains two incised crosses on its east wall, dated by their style to around 700 AD. Saint Cormac (or Cormaic, Carmaig, Charmaig) is an obscure figure; he lived at the beginning of the 7th century and he may have been a son of Cormac, King of Leinster. He is the legendary founder of Keills Chapel 3.5 miles to the north on the Scottish mainland, and he is reputed to have used this cave as his hermitage. The rough stone wall in front of the cave may have been a medieval structure to control pilgrim access to the cave.

== St Cormac's Chapel ==
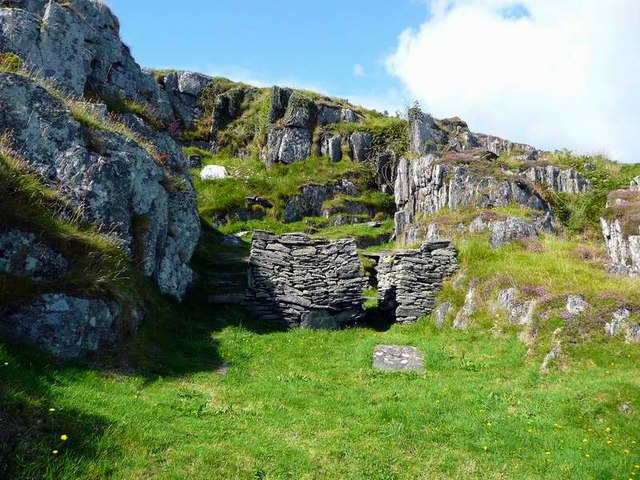
Entrance to St Cormac's Cave

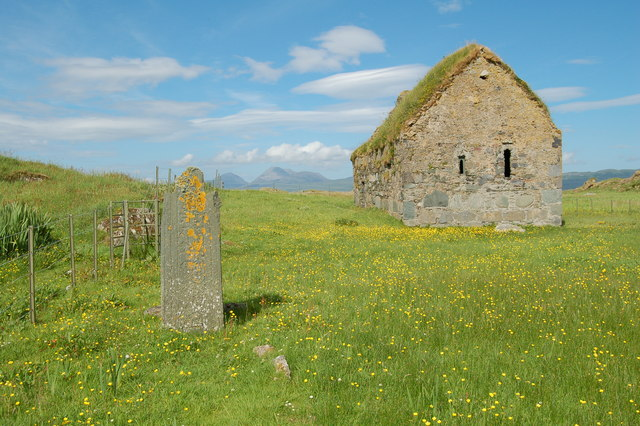
St Cormac's Cross and Chapel

The chapel is a rectangular building measuring 11.5 x 6 metres (38 feet x 20 feet) externally. It was built in the 13th century, and was altered in the 14th century, when John MacDonald, 1st Lord of the Isles had the chancel upgraded. It was converted into a dwelling house around 1700, and used by a tenant of Macneil of Gillchoille, the island's owner. The chapel was surrounded by a burial ground, now mostly obliterated, but the headless effigy of a medieval cleric can still be seen on the south side of the chancel.

== St Cormac's Cross ==
Beside the chapel stands St Cormac's Cross, believed to date from the 10th-century. Legend claims that it stands at the west end of the grave of Saint Cormac. Only the shaft and the lower part of the ringed cross survive. It stands 1.75 metres (5 feet 9 inches) in visible height, but was originally at least 2.8 metres (9 feet) tall. The east face shows two wrestling beak-headed monsters with tails and prominent genitals, above which is a hooded rider astride an oversized horse, and then a large monster gripping a snake in its jaws and linked by its tail and crest to a cruciform group of four animals at the top of the shaft. The decoration on the west face is damaged, but two squatting beasts can be seen with interpenetrating necks and large heads.

Another cross can be seen on the island's highest point, and is a replica of the late 14th-century cross erected by Mariota de Ros, wife of Donald MacDonald, 2nd Lord of the Isles. The original was removed to the National Museum of Scotland in 1937.
