= Danna, Scotland =

Inhabited tidal island in Argyll and Bute

Island of Danna
Danna (Gaelic)
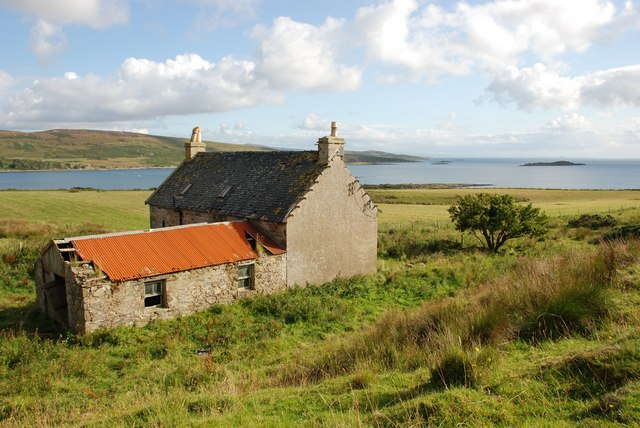
- An empty farmhouse on Danna

Location
- Danna shown within Argyll and Bute
- OS grid reference: NR695785
- Coordinates: 55.94°N 5.69°W

Name
- Gaelic pronunciation: [ˈt̪an̪ˠə]
- Name meaning: Danes' island (from Old Norse Danaey)

Physical geography
- Island group: Islay
- Area: 315 ha (1 1/4 sq mi)
- Area rank: 83
- Highest elevation: 54 m (177 ft)

Administration
- Council area: Argyll and Bute
- Country: Scotland
- Sovereign state: United Kingdom

Demographics
- Population: 5
- Population rank: 80=
- Population density: 1.6/km^{2} (4.1/sq mi)

Danna (Scottish Gaelic: Danna) is an inhabited tidal island in Argyll and Bute.

== Geography ==
It is connected to the mainland by a stone causeway and is at the southern end of the narrow Tayvallich peninsula, which separates Loch Sween from the Sound of Jura. It is part of the Ulva, Danna and the MacCormaig Isles SSSI. Danna is part of the Knapdale National Scenic Area, one of 40 in Scotland.
