= Liath Eilean =

Liath Eilean (Scottish Gaelic: "Grey Island") is the name of several Scottish islands:

- Liath Eilean, MacCormaig Isles
- Liath Eilean, Loch Fyne
- Liath Eilean, Loch Caolisport
