= List of shipwrecks in February 1835 =

The list of shipwrecks in February 1835 includes ships sunk, foundered, wrecked, grounded or otherwise lost during February 1835.

== 1 February ==
List of shipwrecks: 1 February 1835
Ship	State	Description
Hamilton	United States	The ship ran aground and was damaged off Holyhead, Anglesey, United Kingdom. Her passengers and crew were taken off. She was on a voyage from Liverpool, Lancashire, United Kingdom to New York
Lion	United States	The ship was wrecked near Portpatrick, Wigtownshire, United Kingdom with the loss of eleven of her fifteen crew. She was on a voyage from Liverpool to New Orleans, Louisiana, United States.

== 2 February ==
List of shipwrecks: 2 February 1835
Ship	State	Description
John and Mary	United Kingdom	The ship was driven ashore ar Rocky Point, Jamaica. She was on a voyage from Santa Marta and Savanilla, near Puerto Colombia, to Liverpool, Lancashire.
Robert Peel	United Kingdom	The brig was wrecked on the Balconie Briggs, in St Andrews Bay. All ten people on board survived. She was on a voyage from London to Sunderland, County Durham.

== 3 February ==
List of shipwrecks: 3 February 1835
Ship	State	Description
Dorothy	United Kingdom	The ship was driven ashore at Zandvoort, North Holland, Netherlands. Her crew were rescued. She was on a voyage from Sunderland, County Durham to Schiedam, South Holland, Netherlands.
Golden Grove	United Kingdom	The ship was wrecked at São Miguel, Azores, Portugal.
Soleil	France	The ship was wrecked on the Grand Pont Reef, 7 nautical miles (13 km) off the coast of Mauritius. All on board were rescued. She was on a voyage from Marseille, Bouches-du-Rhône to Mauritius.

== 4 February ==
List of shipwrecks: 4 February 1835
Ship	State	Description
Firm	United Kingdom	The brig struck the Ploughseat Rock, in the North Sea off the coast of Northumberland and consequently foundered. Her six crew were rescued by a pilot boat. She was on a voyage from Kirkcaldy, Fife to London.
Scotsman	United Kingdom	The ship ran aground on the Heriot Rock. Her crew were rescued. She was on a voyage from Dundee, Forfarshire to Charleston, South Carolina, United States. She was later refloated and taken in to Leith, Lothian in a severely damaged condition.

== 5 February ==
List of shipwrecks: 5 February 1835
Ship	State	Description
Endeavour	United Kingdom	The brig foundered in the Irish Sea off the mouth of the River Dee with the loss of all ten crew. She was on a voyage from Drogheda, County Louth to Liverpool, Lancashire.
James	United Kingdom	The ship was driven ashore in the Humber.
London	(United Kingdom of Great Britain and Ireland) Isle of Man	The smack was driven ashore and wrecked at Pile Foudrey, Cumberland with the loss of two of the five people on board. She was on a voyage from Ramsey to Liverpool.
Marchioness of Huntley	United Kingdom	The smack was wrecked at the mouth of the River Spey.
Mars	United Kingdom	The ship was driven ashore near Maryport, Cumberland. She was on a voyage from Dublin to Maryport.
Phœnix	France	The ship was driven ashore at Long Island, New York, United States. Her crew were rescued. She was on a voyage from Sète, Hérault to New York City.
St. Michael	United Kingdom	The ship was wrecked near Holyhead, Anglesey with the loss of all hands. She was on a voyage from Bantry, County Cork to Liverpool.
William and Mary	United Kingdom	The sloop was driven ashore in Scallsadle Bay, Isle of Mull, Inner Hebrides. She was on a voyage from Belfast, County Antrim to Londonderry.

== 6 February ==
List of shipwrecks: 6 February 1835
Ship	State	Description
City of Selkirk or Earl of Selkirk	United Kingdom	The ship was driven ashore on Islay, Inner Hebrides. She was on a voyage from Londonderry to Lancaster, Lancashire.
Janet	United Kingdom	The ship was driven ashore at Tayvallich, Argyllshire.
Julia	(United Kingdom of Great Britain and Ireland) British North America	The brig was wrecked in Loch Indaal. Her crew were rescued. She was on a voyage from Greenock, Renfrewshire, United Kingdom to Tobago.
Margaret	United Kingdom	The ship was driven ashore on Islay. She was on a voyage from Liverpool, Lancashire to Killybegs, County Donegal.
St. George	United Kingdom	The ship was driven ashore at Cobh, County Cork. She was on a voyage from Saint John, New Brunswick, British North America to Charleston, Paisley, Renfrewshire.

== 8 February ==
List of shipwrecks: 8 February 1835
Ship	State	Description
Ellen	United Kingdom	The ship was driven ashore and wrecked at Ballycastle, County Mayo. She was on a voyage from London to Westport, County Mayo.
Globe	United Kingdom	The ship was wrecked on the coast of Bahia, Brazil.

== 9 February ==
List of shipwrecks: 9 February 1835
Ship	State	Description
Catherine	United Kingdom	The sloop capsized and sank in a squall off Cullercoats, Northumberland with the loss of all five people on board. She was on a voyage from Peterhead, Aberdeenshire to Newcastle upon Tyne, Northumberland.

== 10 February ==
List of shipwrecks: 10 February 1835
Ship	State	Description
Britannia	United Kingdom	The ship was driven ashore at Cadzand, Zeeland, Netherlands. She was on a voyage from Cephalonia, Greece to Antwerp, Belgium. She was refloated on 16 February and taken in to Vlissingen, Zeeland.

== 11 February ==
List of shipwrecks: 11 February 1835
Ship	State	Description
Senator	United States	The ship was driven ashore at Havre de Grâce, Seine-Inférieure, France.
Two Brothers	United Kingdom	The ship was driven ashore and wrecked at Wells-next-the-Sea, Norfolk.
Water Witch	United Kingdom	The ship caught fire and was beached at Greenock, Renfrewshire, where she was wrecked.
William Mitchell	United Kingdom	The barque was wrecked on "Miaguana", off Bermuda. She was on a voyage from Annotto Bay, Jamaica to London.

== 12 February ==
List of shipwrecks: 12 February 1835
Ship	State	Description
Ploughboy	United Kingdom	The sloop struck the Yellow Rock and was constantly beached at Burnfoot, Ayrshire. She was later refloated.

== 13 February ==
List of shipwrecks: 13 February 1835
Ship	State	Description
Eclaireur	France	The steamship was driven ashore and wrecked on the coast of Algeria with the loss of eighteen lives.
Hebe	United Kingdom	The ship was driven ashore at Calais, France. Her crew survived. She was on a voyage from London to Newcastle upon Tyne, Northumberland.
Llandovey	United Kingdom	The ship was wrecked at Port Maria, Jamaica.
Lovely Nelly	United Kingdom	The ship foundered in the Irish Sea. Her crew were rescued. She was on a voyage from Dublin to Runcorn, Cheshire.
Vigilant	France	The ship was wrecked at Bougie, Algeria.

== 14 February ==
List of shipwrecks: 14 February 1835
Ship	State	Description
Edgar	United Kingdom	The ship was wrecked on Scroby Sands, in the North Sea off the coast of Norfolk. Her crew were rescued.
Nymphe	United Kingdom	The ship was wrecked on the south coast of Bornholm, Denmark. Her crew were rescued. She was on a voyage from Memel, Prussia to Dundee, Forfarshire.

== 16 February ==
List of shipwrecks: 16 February 1835
Ship	State	Description
Berte Cathrine	Norway	The ship was wrecked at Lindesnes. She was on a voyage from Lisbon, Portugal to Bergen.

== 17 February ==
List of shipwrecks: 17 February 1835
Ship	State	Description
Janthe	United Kingdom	The ship departed from Gravesend, Kent for Truro, Cornwall. No further trace, presumed foundered with the loss of all hands.
Reliance	United Kingdom	The ship was stranded on the "Skalliagen". Her crew were rescued. She was on a voyage from Newcastle upon Tyne, Northumberland to Odense, Denmark.
Trial	United Kingdom	The ship sank at Bridgwater, Somerset with the loss of all hands.

== 19 February ==
List of shipwrecks: 19 February 1835
Ship	State	Description
Richard	United Kingdom	The ship was sighted in the Kattegat whilst on a voyage from Memel, Prussia to Liverpool, Lancashire. Presumed subsequently foundered with the loss of all hands.
Saxby	United Kingdom	The ship departed from Wisbech, Cambridgeshire for Southampton, Hampshire. No further trace, presumed foundered with the loss of all hands.

== 20 February ==
List of shipwrecks: 20 February 1835
Ship	State	Description
Carmarthen	United Kingdom	The ship was wrecked near Karlskrona, Sweden. Her crew were rescued. She was on a voyage from Memel, Prussia to Newcastle upon Tyne, Northumberland.
Cartoon	United Kingdom	The ship ran aground in the River Parrett and capsized. She was on a voyage from Bridgwater, Somerset to Dublin.
Eendraghten	Netherlands	The ship was wrecked on the Quack Sandbank. Her crew were rescued. She was on a voyage from Charleston, South Carolina, United States to Rotterdam, South Holland.
John and Isaac	(United Kingdom of Great Britain and Ireland) British North America	The ship was driven ashore at "Melloria", Grand Duchy of Tuscany. Her crew were rescued. She was on a voyage from Newfoundland to Livorno, Grand Duchy of Tuscany.
Squire	United Kingdom	The ship was driven ashore at Great Yarmouth, Norfolk. She was on a voyage from London to Lowestoft, Suffolk.

== 21 February ==
List of shipwrecks: 21 February 1835
Ship	State	Description
Encouragement	United Kingdom	The ship departed from Blyth, Northumberland for Scarborough, Yorkshire. No further trace, presumed foundered in the North Sea with the loss of all hands.
Vegesack	Bremen	The ship capsized at Newport, Monmouthshire, United Kingdom.

== 22 February ==
List of shipwrecks: 22 February 1835
Ship	State	Description
Ann	United Kingdom	The brig was driven ashore and wrecked 5 nautical miles (9.3 km) south of Loch Ryan with the loss of all hands.
Argo	United Kingdom	The ship was driven ashore at Sligo and severely damaged.
Aurora	United Kingdom	The ship was wrecked on the Barnard Sand, in the North Sea off the coast of Suffolk. Her crew were rescued by a pilot boat. She was on a voyage from North Shields, County Durham to London.
Gleaner	United Kingdom	The ship was driven ashore and wrecked in Ardwell Bay with the loss of all hands.
John and Mary	United Kingdom	The ship was driven ashore and wrecked at Breaksea Point, Glamorgan. Her crew were rescued. She was on a voyage from Pembroke to Gloucester
Marquis of Huntley	United Kingdom	The smack was driven ashore and wrecked at Aberdeen. All on board were rescued.
Mary	United Kingdom	The ship was driven ashore at Galway.
Tin Tin	Spain	The ship was driven ashore at Margate, Kent, United Kingdom. She was on a voyage from London to Cádiz. Tin Tin was refloated on 24 February and taken in to Margate.
Vigilant	Sweden	The ship was driven ashore at Galway.

== 23 February ==
List of shipwrecks: 23 February 1835
Ship	State	Description
Alexander	United Kingdom	The barque was driven ashore in the River Mersey.
Catherine or Katherine	United Kingdom	The ship ran aground on the Kettlebottom Sand, in the North Sea off the coast of Norfolk. She refloated but consequently sank. Her crew were rescued. Catherine was on a voyage from Inverkeithing, Fife to London
Endeavour	United Kingdom	The sloop was driven ashore at Girvan, Ayrshire. Her crew were rescued.
Fox	United Kingdom	The ship was driven ashore at Milford Haven, Pembrokeshire.
Grace	United Kingdom	The ship was wrecked at Borgue, Dumfriesshire with the loss of all eight of her crew. She was on a voyage from Dublin to Workington, Cumberland.
Isabella	United Kingdom	The ship was driven ashore in Glenluce Bay. She was on a voyage from Wigton, Cumberland to Ardrossan, Ayrshire.
Lady Louisa	United Kingdom	The ship foundered in the North Sea off Flamborough Head, Yorkshire. Her crew were rescued.
Leven	United Kingdom	The ship was driven ashore at Milford Haven.
Mentor	United Kingdom	The ship departed from Newcastle upon Tyne, Northumberland for London. No furthertrace, presumed foundered with the loss of all hands.
Monmouth	United Kingdom	The ship was driven ashore and severely damaged at Ardglass, County Down. Her crew were rescued. She was on a voyage from Whitehaven, Cumberland to Dublin.
Nile	United Kingdom	The ship capsized in the Irish Sea in a squall with the loss of two of her crew. She was on a voyage from Maryport, Cumberland to Dumfries
Norah	United Kingdom	The ship was wrecked on the East Hoyle Bank, in Liverpool Bay with the loss of all hands. She was on a voyage from Demerara to Liverpool, Lancashire.
Superb	United Kingdom	The steamship was wrecked in the Brazil Bank, in Liverpool Bay. All on board were rescued by Etna (United Kingdom). She was on a voyage from Cork to Liverpool.
Thames	United Kingdom	The ship sprang a leak and was abandoned in the North Sea off Dimlington, Yorkshire.
Thomas & Ann	United Kingdom	The ship was driven ashore at Peel, Isle of Man. Her crew were rescued. She was on a voyage from Bangor, Caernarfonshire to Belfast, County Antrim.
William and Mary	United Kingdom	The ship was driven ashore at Newbiggin, Cumberland. She was refloated on 28 February and taken in to "Pile" for repairs.

== 24 February ==
List of shipwrecks: 24 February 1835
Ship	State	Description
Betsey	United Kingdom	The ship foundered in the North Sea. her crew were rescued. She was on a voyage from Stockton-on-Tees, County Durham to London.
Brancepeth Castle	United Kingdom	The ship was abandoned in the North Sea off Flamborough Head, Yorkshire.
Captain Cook	United Kingdom	The ship foundered in the North Sea 50 nautical miles (93 km) east of Flamborough Head. Her crew were rescued by Hunter (United Kingdom).
Craigie	United Kingdom	The ship was driven ashore at Shoeburyness, Essex and was abandoned by her crew, She was on a voyage from Dundee, Forfarshire to London. Craigie was later refloated and taken in to Southend, Essex.
Heureuse Union	France	The ship was wrecked near "St. Heneaga". Her crew were rescued. She was on a voyage from Port-au-Prince, Haiti to Havre de Grâce, Seine-Inférieure.
Robert Peel	United Kingdom	The barque was wrecked on the West Hoyle Bank, in Liverpool Bay with the loss of four of her seventeen crew. She was on a voyage from Liverpool, Lancashire to a Brazilian port.
St Helena	United Kingdom	The ship foundered in the North Sea. Her crew were rescued, She was on a voyage from South Shields, County Durham to London.
Twe Gebroeders	Denmark	The ship was driven ashore at "Husbye". She was on a voyage from Tønning to Hull, Yorkshire, United Kingdom.

== 25 February ==
List of shipwrecks: 25 February 1835
Ship	State	Description
Ann Elizabeth	United Kingdom	The ship was wrecked on the Small Vogel Sand, in the North Sea. Her crew were rescued. She was on a voyage from Heilingenhaven, Duchy of Holstein to Colchester, Essex.
Eliza	United Kingdom	The ship struck the West Hoyle Bank, in Liverpool Bay. Her crew were rescued by the pilot boat №11 (United Kingdom). She was on a voyage from Saint John, New Brunswick to Liverpool, Lancashire.
Express	United Kingdom	The schooner was driven ashore and wrecked on Sanday, Orkney Islands. Her crew were rescued. She was on a voyage from Lerwick, Shetland Islands to Belfast, County Antrim.
Frederick Angus	Prussia	The ship was driven ashore near "Helinberg". She was on a voyage from Memel to London, United Kingdom.
Lady's Adventure	United Kingdom	The ship was wrecked on the West Hoyle Bank. Her crew were rescued. She was on a voyage from Mostyn, Flintshire to Dublin.
Lively	United Kingdom	The ship was wrecked on the Gunfleet Sand, in the North Sea off the coast of Essex. Her crew were rescued.
Manfred	United Kingdom	The ship struck the Scorigal Rocks, in the North Sea and sank. Her crew were rescued. she was on a voyage from Inverness to Leith, Lothian.
Reine Blanche	United Kingdom	The ship was abandoned on the Shipwash Sand, in the North Sea off the coast of Suffolk.
Sally	United Kingdom	The ship was wrecked on the Herd Sand, in the North Sea off the coast of County Durham. Her crew were rescued. She was on a voyage from South Shields, County Durham to King's Lynn, Norfolk.
Sophie Elise	flag unknown	The ship was severely damaged at sea. She arrived at Heligoland where she was declared a total loss. Sophie Elise was on a voyage from "Horemersiel" to Goole, Yorkshire, United Kingdom.

== 27 February ==
List of shipwrecks: 27 February 1835
Ship	State	Description
HMS Firefly	Royal Navy	The schooner was wrecked on the Northern Triangles, off Belize with the loss of thirteen of her 23 crew.

== 28 February ==
List of shipwrecks: 28 February 1835
Ship	State	Description
John and Elizabeth	United Kingdom	The ship sprang a leak and was abandoned in the North Sea. She was on a voyage from Newcastle upon Tyne, Northumberland to Montrose, Forfarshire.

== Unknown date ==
List of shipwrecks: Unknown date 1835
Ship	State	Description
Caroline	United Kingdom	The ship was wrecked on Bodie Island, North Carolina before 28 February. Her crew were rescued. She was on a voyage from New York to Norfolk, Virginia.
Chance	United Kingdom	The ship was driven ashore and wrecked at St. Bees Head, Cumberland before 24 February. One crew member was lost.
Daniel	United States	The whaler was last sighted during February. No further trace, presumed foundered with the loss of all hands.
Ebba Charlotta	Denmark	The brig was wrecked on the Shipwash Sand, in the North Sea off the coast of Suffolk, United Kingdom before 14 February.
Glory	United Kingdom	The ship was wrecked at Memel, Prussia before 7 February.
Jenny	United Kingdom	The ship foundered off the Mull of Galloway, Argyllshire. Her crew were rescued. She was on a voyage from Portaferry, County Down to Glasgow, Renfrewshire.
Jubilee	United Kingdom	The ship was driven ashore at North Somercotes, Lincolnshire, She was on a voyage from London to Goole, Yorkshire.
Musgrave	United Kingdom	The ship was driven ashore south of St. Bees Head before 24 February.
Regent	United Kingdom	The ship foundered in the North Sea off Föhr, Duchy of Schleswig before 20 February.
Rescue	United Kingdom	The schooner was driven ashore and wrecked near the "Red Noses", Lancashire.
St. Michael	United States	The sloop was wrecked in Carnarvon Bay before 6 February.
Three Sisters	United Kingdom	The ship was driven ashore at Portmadoc, Merionethshire. She was on a voyage from Dungarvan, County Waterford to Liverpool, Lancashire.
Venus	United Kingdom	The ship foundered in the Bristol Channel off Penarth, Glamorgan. She was on a voyage from Newport, Monmouthshire to Plymouth, Devon.
Vine	United Kingdom	The ship was driven ashore and wrecked at Downing's Lodge, County Donegal. Her crew were rescued. She was on a voyage from Ardrossan, Ayrshire to Sligo.
