= MacCormaig Isles =

Archipelago in Argyll and Bute, Scotland

The MacCormaig Isles are small islands south of the Island of Danna in the Inner Hebrides of Scotland.

The MacCormaig Islands lie in the entrance to Loch Sween within the powerful tides of the Sound of Jura. They form part of the Ulva, Danna and the McCormaig (sic) Isles SSSI. Islands include:

- Carraig an Daimh (NR662789)
- Corr Eilean (NR677758)
- Eilean Ghamhna (NR680758)
- Liath Eilean (NR685784)
- Eilean Mòr (NR666753)
- Sgeir Bun an Locha
- Sgeir Dhonncha
- Dubh Sgeir

Eilean Mòr is owned by Scottish National Party. The 12th century chapel on it is dedicated to St Cormac (d.640).

The islands are a popular sea kayaking destination.

== Gallery ==
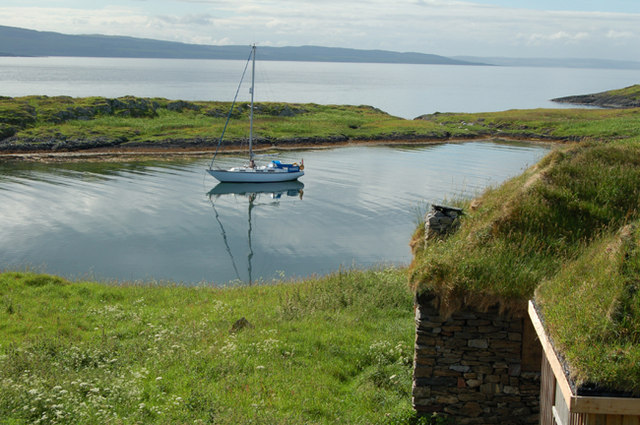
Eilean Mòr anchorage

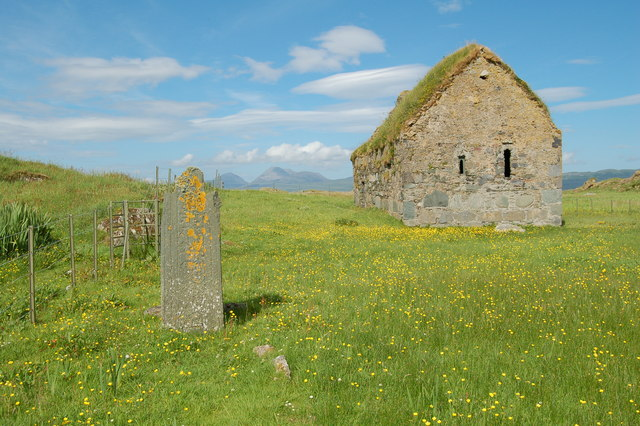
Eilean Mòr chapel

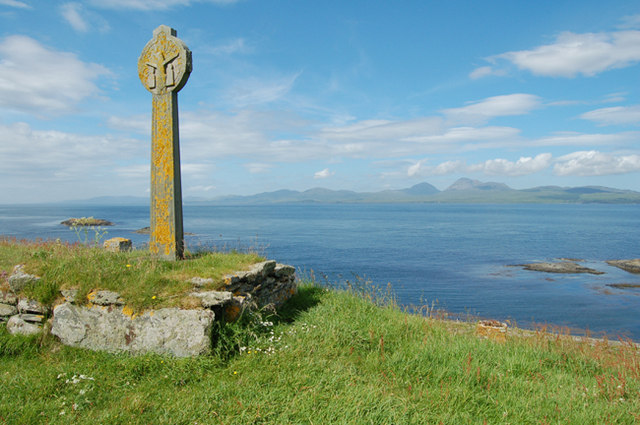
Eilean Mòr towards Jura

== See also ==
- List of islands of Scotland
