= Kilmory, Knapdale =

Hamlet in Argyll and Bute, Scotland

Coordinates: 55.913900°N 5.677131°W

Kilmory: Scottish Gaelic: Cill Mhoire
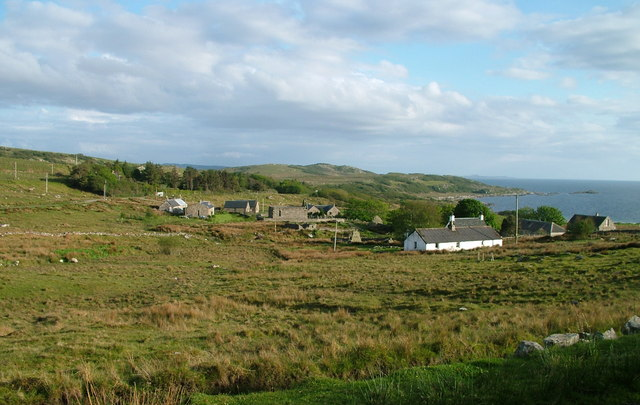
- Kilmory viewed from the north, 2009

- Location within Argyll and Bute
- Civil parish: South Knapdale
- Council area: Argyll and Bute
- Lieutenancy area: Argyll and Bute
- Country: Scotland
- Sovereign state: United Kingdom
- Police: Scotland
- Fire: Scottish
- Ambulance: Scottish
- UK Parliament: Argyll, Bute and South Lochaber
- Scottish Parliament: Argyll and Bute

Kilmory (Scottish Gaelic: Cill Mhoire) is a hamlet in the civil parish of South Knapdale, on Knapdale, Argyll and Bute, Scotland. It is situated near the mouth of Loch Sween on its southern shores. In 1961 it had a population of 81.

Kilmory Knap Chapel, located around 1,700 feet (520 m) northeast of Kilmory Beach, dates to the 13th century.

Three schools, established by the Society in Scotland for Propagating Christian Knowledge (SSPCK), existed here in the 19th century.
