= Keills Chapel =

Chapel in the Highlands of Scotland

Coordinates: 55°57′42.79″N 5°42′7.47″W

Keills Chapel

Keills Chapel is a small chapel located in the west Highlands, Scotland, near the village of Tayvallich, Knapdale.

The chapel dates from the 11th century and is in the care of Historic Scotland as is Kilmory Knap Chapel on the opposite shore of Loch Sween. It is open at all reasonable times and there is no entrance charge.

== Keills Chapel ==
The name originates from the word keeill, meaning chapel. The re-roofed structure contains an important collection of early stone sculpture, including six early Christian cross-slabs, around forty late medieval grave slabs recovered from the chapel or churchyard, and a Celtic cross which previously stood outside the chapel where a modern blank replacement now stands. The original has been moved inside the chapel to protect it from the elements.

== Keills Cross ==
The complete and well-preserved late 8th-early 9th century cross is carved from local grey-green epidiorite. It is only decorated on one face, the sides and back being dressed smooth without further decoration. Its proportions are unusual, with very short side-arms broader than the shaft and upper limb. The latter shows the archangel St. Michael standing over a serpent (a symbol of triumph over the devil). The lower limb shows Christ on the Judgement Seat. He is holding a book, possibly the Bible or New Testament, symbolising mercy, in his left hand, and a flail in his right, symbolising judgement. There is a circular design at the crossing, with three round objects in the centre, which may symbolise the Holy Trinity. Around this are four animals representing the four evangelists.

== Images ==
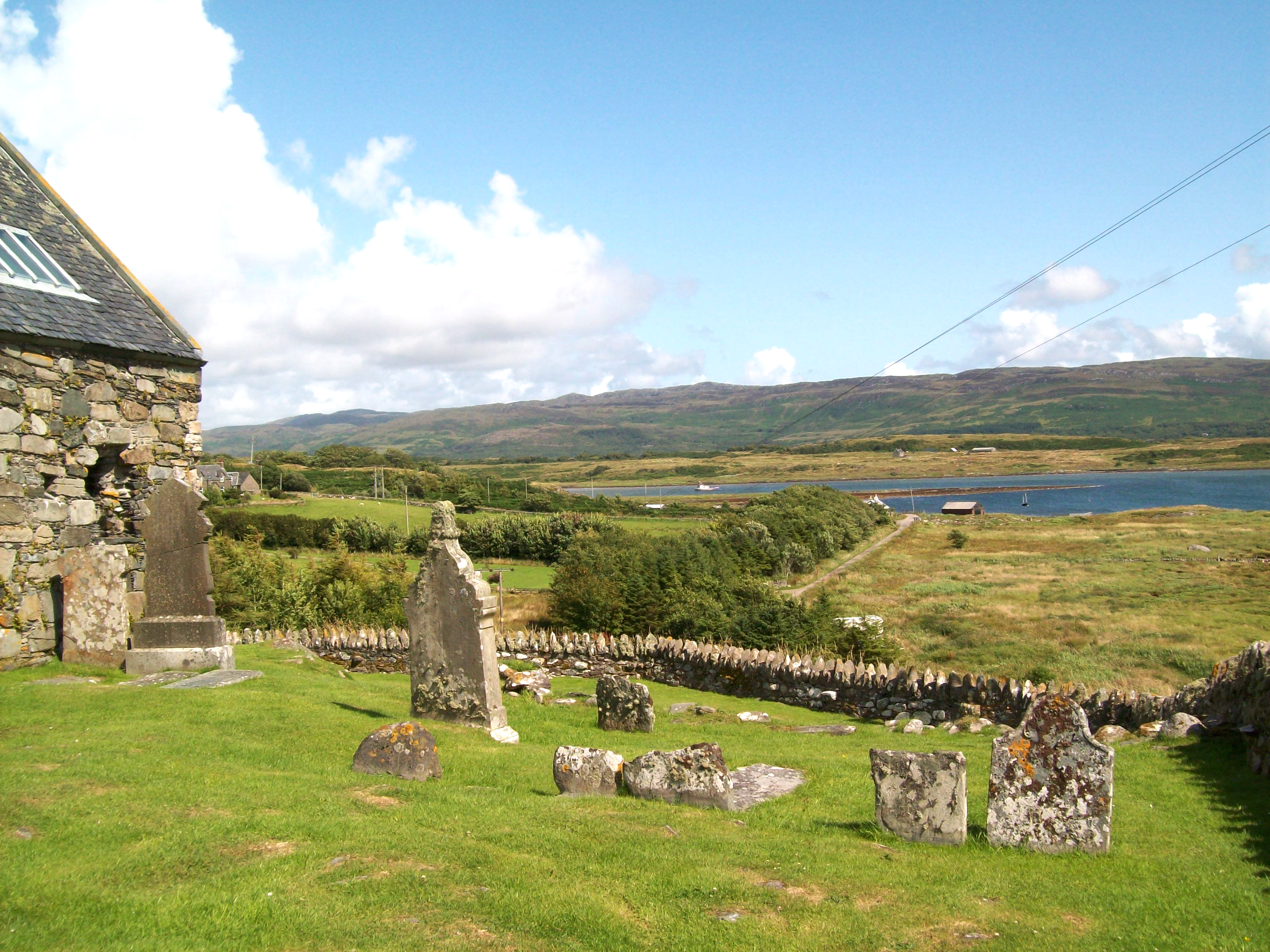
A view from the graveyard

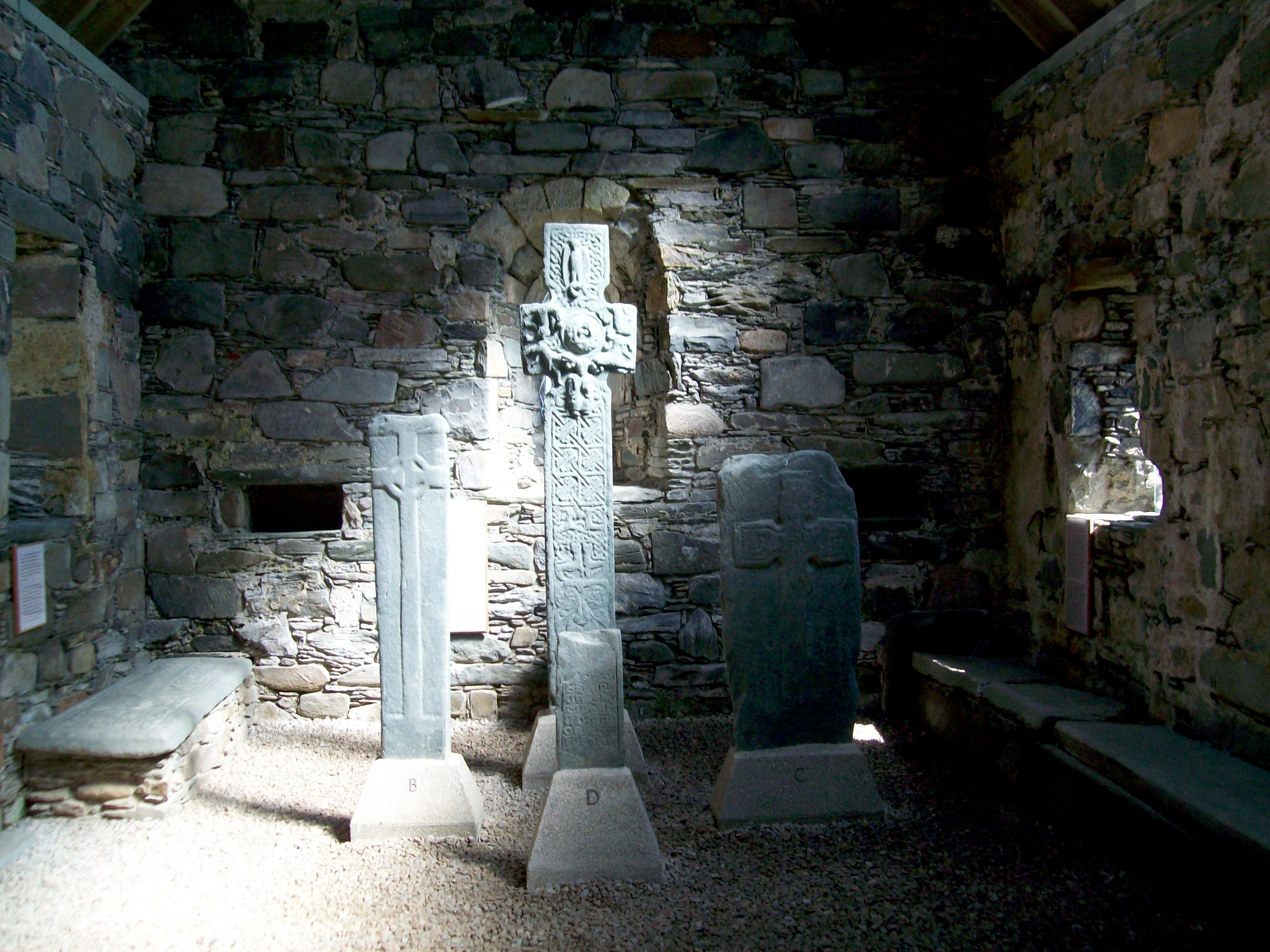
Inside Keills Chapel

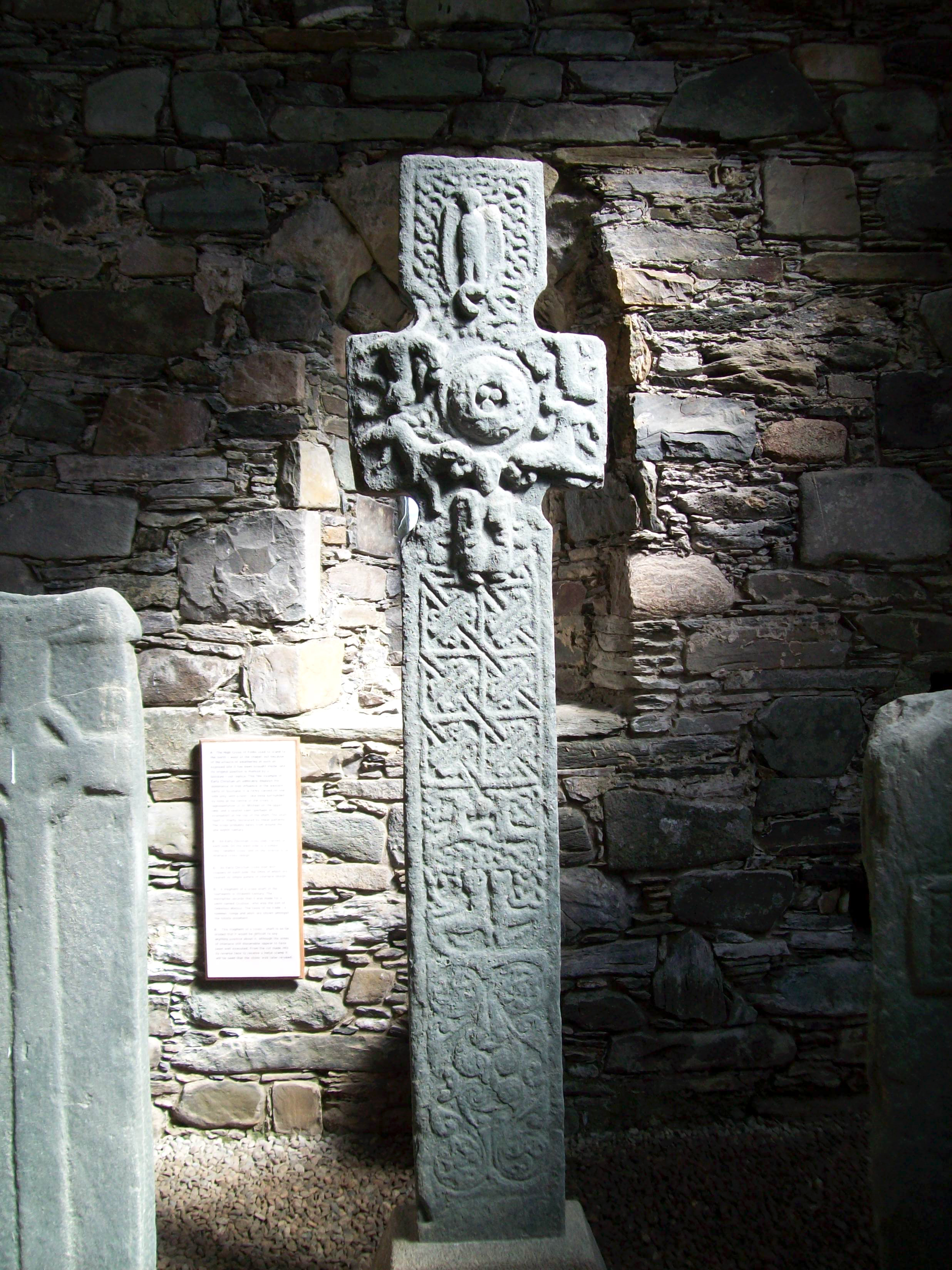
Keills Chapel Cross

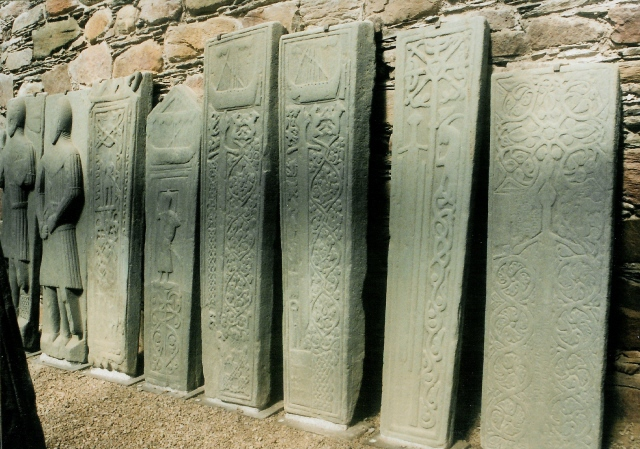
Grave slabs in Keills Chapel
