= Kilmory Knap Chapel =

Ruined chapel in Scotland

Coordinates: 55.91400604°N 5.67775315°W

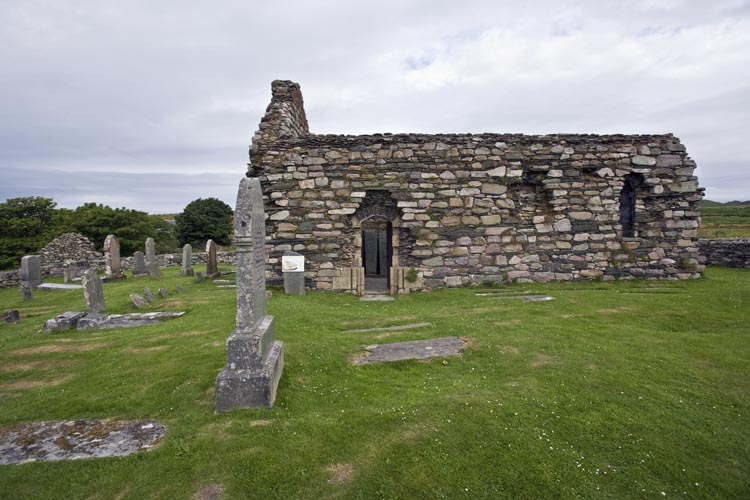
Kilmory medieval Chapel possibly associated with the Knights Templar

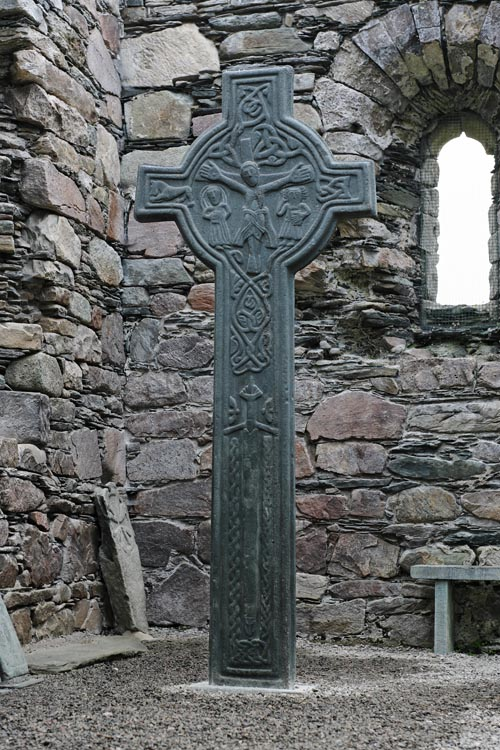
Kilmory Knap Chapel MacMillan's Cross which originally stood in the Chapel Cemetery

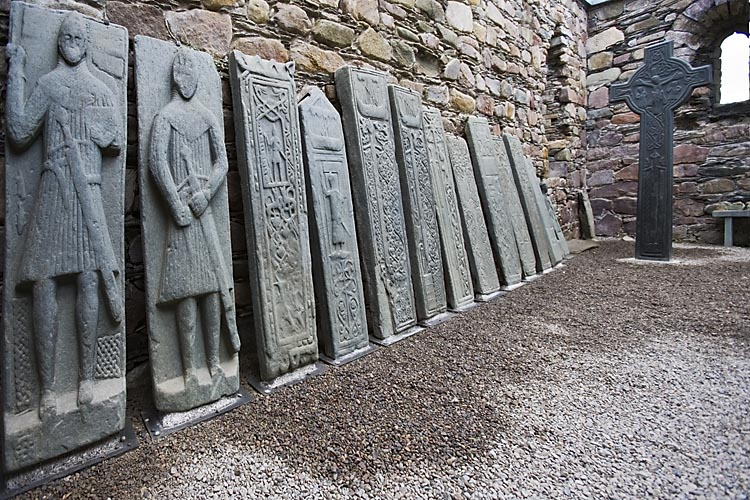
Carved life size grave slabs mostly from the 14th and 15th centuries at Kilmory Chapel

Kilmory Knap Chapel

Kilmory Knap Chapel is a 13th-century Christian chapel, located at the tiny hamlet of Kilmory, in Knapdale, Argyll and Bute, on the west coast of Scotland.

Kilmory Knap Chapel is on Ellary Estate, next to Loch Sween, on the opposite shore to Keills Chapel. When the roof was lost the building was used as a burial enclosure. The structure was re-roofed in 1934 to hold a large collection of Early Christian cross slabs, late medieval graveslabs and standing crosses of West Highland type, from the 14th to 16th centuries. The chapel is an important historical site of Clan Macmillan (of Knap). In the church is Macmillan's Cross, a well-preserved piece of medieval carving, portraying the Chief of the clan with hunting dogs. The chapel and cross are cared for by Historic Scotland on behalf of the State and are a scheduled monument.

Simon Brighton associates Kilmory Knap Chapel with the Knights Templar, suggesting the area may have given refuge to Templars fleeing persecution in France.
