= Achnamara =

Village in Argyll and Bute, Scotland

Coordinates: 56.025685°N 5.565594°W

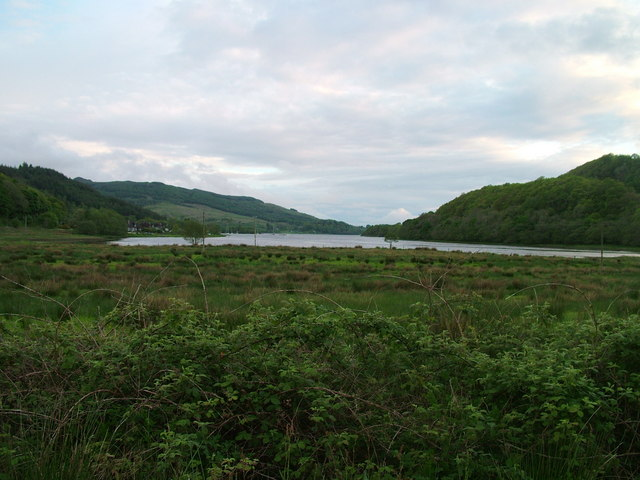
Loch Sween and Achnamara, 2009

Achnamara (Scottish Gaelic: Achadh na Mara) is a village in the Scottish council area of Argyll and Bute. Its location is approximately 56°1' N 5°34' W. Achnamara means 'field by the sea'. The name is formed from the Gaelic words achadh 'field', the definite article an, and muir 'sea'.

It is a small village with 23 houses in it. it sits at the top of Knapdale Water. There was an outdoor centre for school children which closed down in 1997 and is now derelict.
