= Tayvallich =

Coordinates: 56°1′38″N 5°37′10″W

Tayvallich: Scottish Gaelic: Taigh a' Bhealaich; Scots: Tayvallich; Tavy
- Village
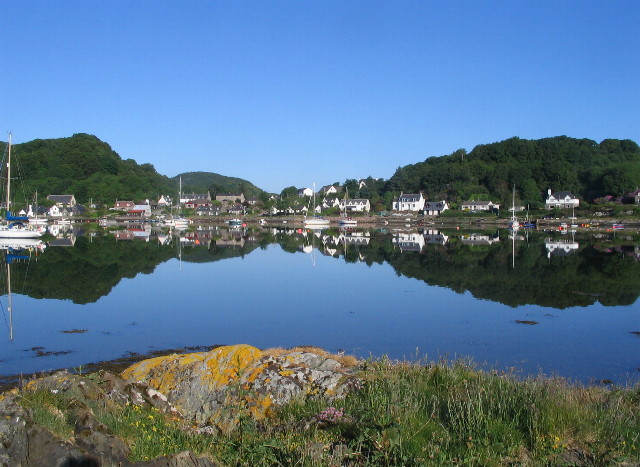
- Tayvallich

- Location within Argyll and Bute
- Population: 300
  - Edinburgh: 95.5 mi (154 km)
  - London: 385 mi (620 km)
- Council area: Argyll and Bute
- Country: Scotland
- Sovereign state: United Kingdom
- Post town: LOCHGILPHEAD
- Postcode district: PA
- UK Parliament: Argyll, Bute and South Lochaber
- Scottish Parliament: Argyll and Bute
- Website: https://www.tayvallich.com

Tayvallich (pronounced TAY-vee-AL-ich; Scottish Gaelic: Taigh a' Bhealaich [t̪ʰəˈvjal̪ˠɪç]) is a small village in the Knapdale area of Argyll and Bute, west of Scotland. The village name has its origins in Gaelic, and means the "house of the pass". The village is built around a sheltered harbour on Loch Sween. The village has a caravan park, pub and village store. The local economy is based on tourism, fishing and has become a popular sailing centre. In 1961 it had a population of 72.

The village has a primary school, the nearest high school is in Lochgilphead.

== Transport ==
There is a local bus service to nearby Lochgilphead.

During the summer months a fast passenger ferry (catamaran) operates from Tayvallich to Craighouse, on the island of Jura across the Sound of Jura, four days a week.

== Carsaig ==
Tayvallich is split into two areas; Carsaig and Tayvallich. Loch Sween cuts northeast into the Knapdale Peninsula and the western shore of the loch forms a smaller peninsula. Towards the north end of this peninsula an isthmus is formed about a kilometre wide and the east side has an almost landlocked bay which is where Tayvallich is located and the west side of the isthmus is Carsaig Bay. A road now links Tayvallich and Carsaig.

== Gallery ==
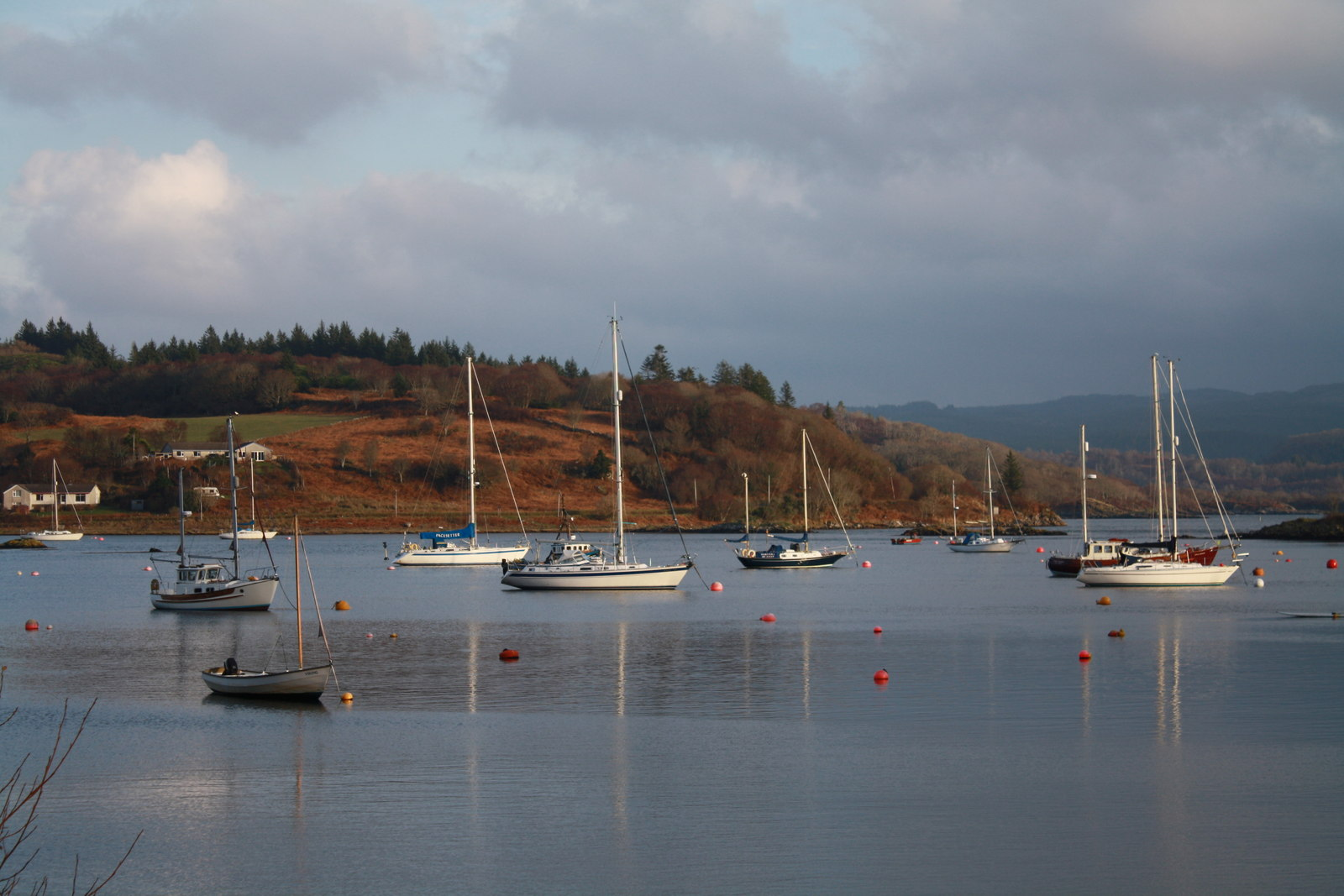
Boats at Tayvallich

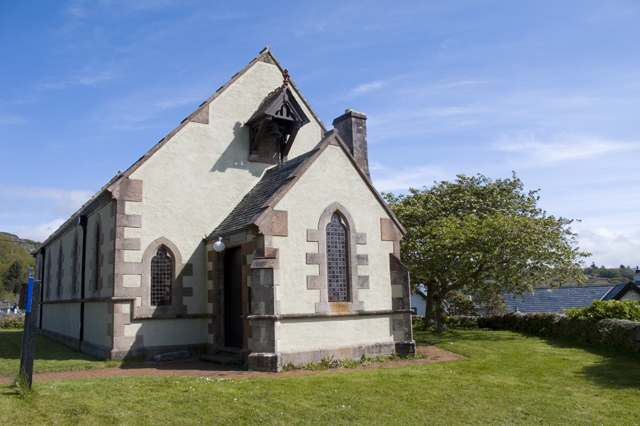
Tayvallich Church
