= Loch Sween =

Loch in Argyll and Bute, Scotland

Loch Sween MPA
- IUCN category IV (habitat/species management area)
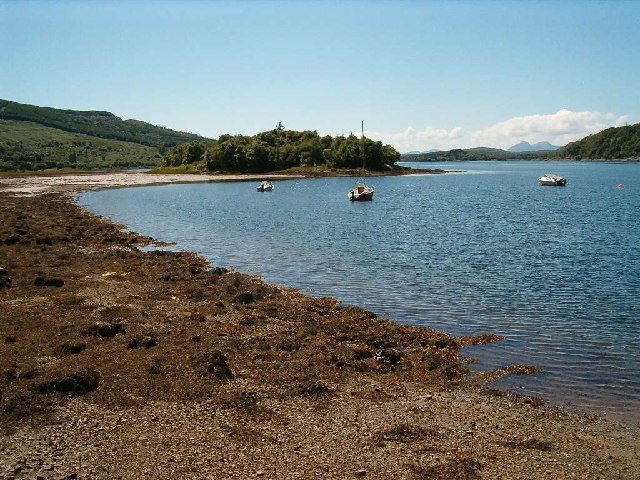
- The tidal islet of Eilean Mhartan in the inner loch, with the Paps of Jura in the distance

- Location within Argyll and Bute
- Location: Argyll and Bute, Scotland
- Coordinates: 55.97°N 5.65°W
- Area: 4,100 ha (16 sq mi)
- Designation: Scottish Government
- Established: 2014
- Operator: Marine Scotland

Loch Sween (Scottish Gaelic: Loch Suain or Loch Suibhne) is a sea loch located near Lochgilphead, Argyll and Bute, Scotland. Castle Sween is located on the southern shore towards the seaward end of the loch. The village of Tayvallich, a favoured haven for water craft as it sits at the head of sheltered Loch a' Bhealaich, lies on the northern shore.

The shape of the loch, which is oriented from south west to north east, is complex. The inner, eastern end has several inlets. Caol Scotnish is a very narrow finger that reaches further north and east than the main body of water. Loch a' Bhealaich is to its south and west. There is the small, bridged embayment of Loch Craiglin on the south side of the inner loch and another larger inlet incorporating Bàgh na h-Araich Glaise that leads to the settlement of Achnamara. Linne Mhuirich is a long narrow inlet about halfway down the loch on the north side. The bay of Ceann an t-Sàilein lies between the Island of Danna and the main loch at the western end. Danna is now joined to the mainland by a causeway but at one time small craft could have travelled from Loch Sween into Loch na Cille to the north.

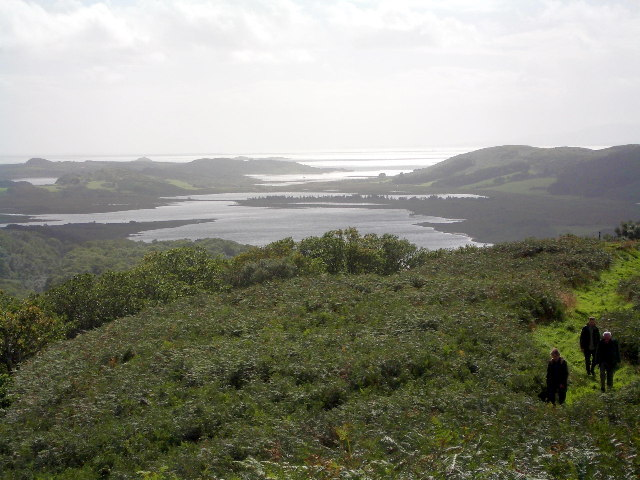
Looking south over Linne Mhuirich from Taynish, across to the Ulva islands, Druim Mòr and the Island of Danna. The main body of Loch Sween is to the left.

There are a variety of islands on the northern shore. Close to Danna are the islets of Eilean à Chapuill, Eilean nan Uan and Liath Eilean. The low-lying Ulva Islands and Taynish Island are farther east. Cala and Eilean Loain are on the southern shore further east with tidal Eilean Mhartan and tiny Sgeir Dubh beyond them in the Araich Glaise inlet. The Fairy Islands, including Eilean a' Bhrein are in yet another inlet to the north and Eilean na Circe, which contains the ruins of a "fortified dwelling" is in the confines of Caol Scotnish.

The inner loch contains maerl beds and burrowed mud, and supports a colony of volcano worm, whilst the sea bed in the more strongly tidal areas at the mouth of the loch is composed of coarser sediments. The loch is also home to one of Scotland's most important populations of native oyster.

Loch Sween was designated as a Nature Conservation Marine Protected Area (NCMPA) in 2014, and is considered to be a Category IV protected area by the International Union for Conservation of Nature.
