= James Douglas =

James Douglas may refer to:

== Scottish noblemen ==
=== Lords of Angus ===
- James Douglas, 3rd Earl of Angus (1426–1446), Scottish nobleman
- James Douglas, Earl of Angus (1671–1692), son of the 2nd Marquess of Douglas

=== Lords of Douglas ===
- James Douglas, Lord of Douglas (1286–1330), ("the Good", "the Black"), Scottish warlord and champion of Robert the Bruce
- James Douglas, 2nd Earl of Douglas (c. 1358–1388)
- James Douglas, 7th Earl of Douglas (1371–1443), "the Gross"
- James Douglas, 9th Earl of Douglas (1426–1488), Scottish nobleman
- Lord James Douglas (1617–1645), son of the 1st Marquess of Douglas
- James Douglas, 2nd Marquess of Douglas (1646–1700)

=== Lords of Morton ===
- James Douglas, 1st Earl of Morton (1426–1493)
- James Douglas, 3rd Earl of Morton (died 1548)
- James Douglas, 4th Earl of Morton (c. 1516–1581)
- James Douglas, 10th Earl of Morton (died 1686), Earl of Morton
- James Douglas, 11th Earl of Morton (died 1715), Earl of Morton
- James Douglas, 14th Earl of Morton (1702–1768), Scottish astronomer and peer

=== Elsewhere ===
- James Douglas, 5th Earl of Buchan (died 1601), Scottish courtier and landowner
- James Douglas of Parkhead (died 1608), Scottish landowner
- James Douglas of Spott (died 1615), Scottish landowner and conspirator
- James Douglas, 2nd Earl of Queensberry (died 1671)
- James Douglas, 4th Duke of Hamilton (1658–1712)
- James Douglas, 2nd Duke of Queensberry (1662–1711), also 1st Duke of Dover
- James Douglas, 3rd Marquess of Queensberry (1697–1715), lunatic and cannibal
- James Douglas-Hamilton, Baron Selkirk of Douglas (born 1942), former MP and MSP, also briefly 11th Earl of Selkirk
- James Douglas, 1st Lord Mordington (died 1656)
- James Douglas, 3rd Lord Mordington (1651–?)
- James Douglas, 7th of Drumlanrig (died 1578), Scottish nobleman
- James Douglas, 1st Lord Dalkeith, Scottish nobleman
- James Douglas, 4th Baron Douglas (1787–1857)

== Politicians ==
- James Douglas Stoddart Douglas (1793–1875), MP for Rochester
- James Douglas (died 1751), British member of parliament for Malmesbury and St. Mawes
- James Douglas (1878–1956), Polish diplomat
- James Lester Douglas (1881–1950), Canadian member of Parliament for Queen's, Prince Edward Island
- James McCrie Douglas (1867–1950), politician in Alberta, Canada and former mayor of Edmonton
- James Moffat Douglas (1839–1920), Canadian member of parliament and senator from Saskatchewan
- James G. Douglas (1887–1954), supporter of Michael Collins, architect of Irish Free State Constitution, member of Irish Senate
- Jim Douglas (born 1951), governor of Vermont
- Sir James Douglas (governor) (1803–1877), governor of Vancouver Island and British Columbia; head of Hudson's Bay Company operations in the Columbia District
- James Douglas (British Army officer) (1785–1862), British Army officer and Lieutenant Governor of Guernsey
- James Robson Douglas (1876–1934), lieutenant governor of Nova Scotia
- James W. Douglas (1851–1883), political figure in British Columbia
- James Postell Douglas (1836–1901), soldier, politician, and businessman in the state of Texas
- James Douglas (Australian politician) (died 1905), New South Wales colonial politician
- James Douglas (plumber) (1872–1957), New Zealand plumber and mayor of Dunedin
- James Stuart Douglas (1876–1924), Louisiana politician in the state house of representatives.

== Sportspeople ==
- James Douglas (rugby union), New Zealand international rugby union player
- Jimmy Douglas (American soccer) (1898–1972), goalkeeper
- Jimmy Douglas (Canadian soccer) (born 1948), midfielder and coach
- James Douglas (cricketer) (1870–1958), English cricketer
- Jimmy Douglas (Scottish footballer) (1859–1919), Scottish international footballer
- Buster Douglas (James Douglas, born 1960), American boxer
- James Scott Douglas (1930–1969), British racing driver

== Military ==
- James Douglas (English Army officer) (died 1691), colonel of the Scots Regiment of Footguards, a regiment on the establishment of the English Army
- James H. Douglas Jr. (1899–1988), United States secretary of the Air Force and United States deputy secretary of Defense
- Sir James Douglas, 1st Baronet (1703–1787), commodore for Newfoundland and Labrador

== Other ==
- James Douglas (antiquary) (1753–1819), English clergyman
- James Douglas (physician) (1675–1742), Scottish anatomist and physician
- James Douglas (businessman) (1837–1918), Canadian-born U.S. mining engineer, industrialist, and philanthropist
- James Douglas Jr. (1868–1949), Canadian-American businessman and mining executive
- James Douglas (composer) (1932–2022), Scottish composer
- James Douglas (journalist) (1867–1940), British newspaper editor, author and critic
- James Douglas (actor) (1929–2016), American soap opera actor
- James W. B. Douglas (1914–1992), British social researcher
- James Douglas (architect) (1823–?), American architect in Wisconsin
- James Douglas (judge) (born 1950), justice of the Supreme Court of Queensland
- Jim Douglas (guitarist) (1942–2025), Scottish jazz guitarist
- James Sholto Douglas (1757–1833), Scottish diplomat
- James Douglas (River City), fictional character

== See also ==
- James Douglass (disambiguation)
- Jamie Douglas (disambiguation)
