= Lady Douglas =

The title Lady Douglas has been held by, or attributed to, several notable women, including:

- Janet Douglas, Lady Glamis (c.1498-1537)
- Margaret Douglas, Countess of Lennox, born Lady Margaret Douglas (1515-1578)
- Lady Jane Douglas (1698-1753)
- Frances Douglas, Lady Douglas (1750-1817)

See also Douglas-Home
