= Caroline Townshend, 1st Baroness Greenwich =

1st Baroness Greenwich

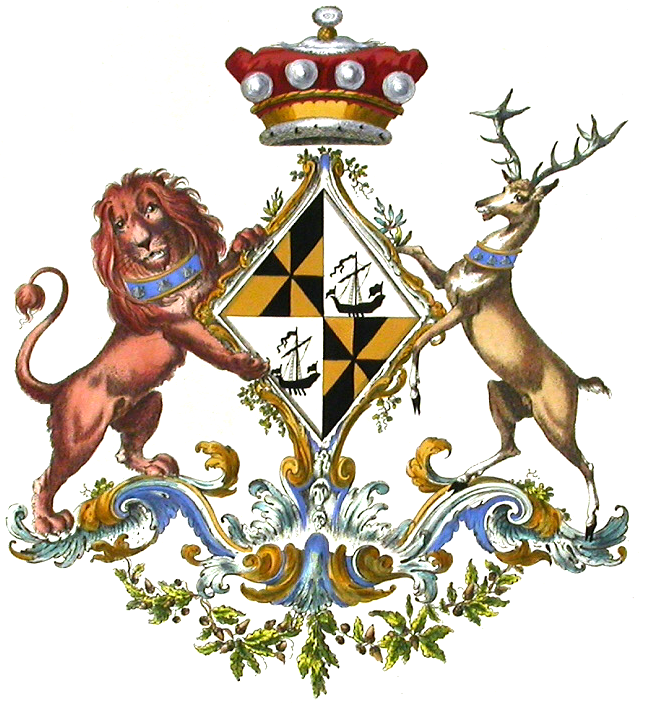
Arms of the Baroness Greenwich

Caroline Townshend, 1st Baroness Greenwich (née Campbell, 17 November 1717 – 11 January 1794) was a British peeress, the daughter and eldest child of John Campbell, 2nd Duke of Argyll, and his wife, the former Jane Warburton. She was a sister of the diarist Lady Mary Coke.

On 2 October 1742, she married Francis Scott, Earl of Dalkeith (elder son of the 2nd Duke of Buccleuch), and took the courtesy title of Countess of Dalkeith. They became parents of Henry Scott, 3rd Duke of Buccleuch (1746–1812). Henry was styled Lord Scott of Whitchester after his brother's death, and Earl of Dalkeith after his father's death and succeeded his grandfather as Duke of Buccleuch in 1751. Their other children were:

- Caroline Scott (1743–1753)
- John Scott, styled Lord Scott of Whitchester (1745–1749)
- Campbell Scott (1747–1766)
- James Scott (1748–1758)
- Frances Scott (1750–1817), who married, as his second wife, Archibald Douglas, 1st Baron Douglas, and had children, including the novelist Caroline Lucy Scott

Francis died in 1750; on 15 August 1755, Caroline married Charles Townshend (a son of the 3rd Viscount Townshend). They had one child, Anne Townshend (1756 – after 1786), who married twice and had children.

On 28 August 1767, Caroline was created Baroness Greenwich (a nod to her deceased father's title, Duke of Greenwich) in her own right, with a special remainder to her male issue by Townshend. As there were no surviving sons from her second marriage, the title became extinct upon her death in 1794, aged 76.

An excoriating sketch of Lady Greenwich's character and her unkindness to her daughter was recorded by Lady Louisa Stuart in her Memoire of Frances, Lady Douglas.

A drawing of Caroline by Thomas Bardwell is held by the National Gallery of Scotland.

Peerage of Great Britain
New creation	Baroness Greenwich; 1767–1794	Extinct
