= Berwickshire, Haddington, Linlithgow and Peebles Militia =

Auxiliary unit of the British Army

Berwickshire Militia Berwickshire, Haddington, Linlithgow & Peebles Militia Haddington, Berwickshire, Linlithgow & Peebles Artillery Militia South-East of Scotland Artillery
- Active: 1661–1707; 1802–1909
- Country: United Kingdom
- Branch: Militia
- Role: Infantry (1661–1707, 1802–1861); Garrison Artillery (1861–1908); Field Artillery (1908–09)
- Part of: Scottish Division, RA (1882–89); Southern Division, RA (1889–1902)
- Garrison/HQ: Coldstream; Duns; Dunbar

Commanders
- Notable commanders: Alexander Home, 10th Earl of Home

The Berwickshire Militia, later the Berwickshire, Haddington, Linlithgow and Peebles Militia (BHL&P Militia), was an auxiliary regiment of the British Army recruited across South-East Scotland. First organised after the restoration of Charles II, it was reformed in 1802 and later converted to artillery. It served in home defence in all of Britain's major wars until it was disbanded in 1909.

== Scottish Militia ==
The universal obligation to military service in the Shire levy was long established in Scotland: all men aged from 16 to 60 were obliged to serve for a maximum of 40 days in any one year if required, and their arms and equipment were inspected at regular Wapenshaws. In time of war they would be called out by proclamation and by riders galloping through towns and villages bearing the 'Fiery Cross'. Following the restoration of Charles II, the Scottish Parliament passed an Act in 1661 to create a militia of 20,000 infantry and 2000 horse, available for Crown service anywhere in Scotland, England or Ireland. The contribution from the county of Berwickshire was to be 800 foot and 74 horse. Given the disturbed state of Scotland at this time, the Berwickshire Militia was frequently on active service between 1670 and 1685. During Argyll's Rising in 1685 King James II & VII ordered the disarming of many of the Scottish Militia for fear that they would join the rebel duke. However, the Scottish Militia were called out in 1689 during the Glorious Revolution that overthrew James.

Following the Union in 1707, during the War of the Spanish Succession, the Parliament of Great Britain passed an Act in 1708 to re-arm the Scottish Militia. However, the Act was denied Royal assent because of fears that the new force would be disloyal (a Jacobite uprising in Scotland was expected in support of the French invasion fleet that was then at sea). In the aftermath of the Jacobite Rising of 1715 a Disarming Act was passed in Scotland and although some militia served in the government forces that fought against the Jacobite Rising of 1745 there was a reluctance to leave weapons in the hands of those who might rebel.

The English Militia were conscripted by ballot, and this system was revived in 1757 during the Seven Years' War. However, there were residual fears of Jacobitism in Scotland, so rather than extend the Militia Acts to Scotland, full-time home defence regiments of 'Fencibles' were raised for the duration of the war. These soldiers were recruited in the normal way under officers commissioned by the king, unlike militiamen who were raised by ballot and commanded by local officers appointed by the Lord-lieutenant.

== Berwickshire, Haddington, Linlithgow & Peebles Militia ==
=== French Revolutionary War ===
Fear of Jacobitism had been replaced by fear of Jacobinism by the 1790s, and the Militia Act 1797 finally extended the county militia system to Scotland during the French Revolutionary War. Ten regiments of Scottish militia were raised in 1798 under the Act, including the 10th (or Edinburgh) Regiment of North British Militia under the command of Colonel Henry Scott, 3rd Duke of Buccleuch, appointed on 10 March 1798 and given the rank of Brevet Colonel in the army while the regiment was embodied. His son-in-law, Alexander Home, 10th Earl of Home, was appointed Lieutenant-Colonel. The regiment's recruiting areas and quotas were defined as:

- Edinburgh (county): 230 men
- Edinburgh (city): 83 men
- Linlithgowshire: 74 men
- Haddingtonshire: 144 men
- Berwickshire: 153 men

There was considerable opposition to the ballot in western Scotland, but the counties making up the 10th Regiment's recruiting area seem to have been little affected by disorder. The regiment served in various garrisons across Scotland until April 1802, when the militia was disembodied after hostilities ended with the Treaty of Amiens. The regiment was reduced to a permanent staff of 40 non-commissioned officers (NCOs) and drummers under the adjutant and the weapons were deposited at Edinburgh Castle.

The disembodied Scottish Militia regiments were reorganised under a new Militia Act in 1802, with the 10th Regiment split to form one unit centred on Edinburgh (the Edinburgh County Militia), while the other counties joined with Peeblesshire to form the 1st (or Berwickshire) North British Regiment of Militia, soon afterwards known as the Berwickshire, Haddington, Linlithgow and Peebles Militia (BHL&P Militia). The combined militia quota for the four counties was 448 men. The Earl of Home, as Lord Lieutenant of Berwickshire, was appointed colonel of the new regiment on 5 October 1802.

=== Napoleonic Wars ===
The Peace of Amiens was short-lived and the reorganised Scottish Militia was embodied in 1803 when the quota for the four counties was raised to 674 men. During the Napoleonic Wars the militia were embodied for over a decade, and became regiments of full-time professional soldiers (though restricted to service in the British Isles), which the regular Army increasingly saw as a prime source of recruits. They moved around frequently, serving in coast defences, manning garrisons, guarding prisoners of war, and carrying out internal security duty.

Early in 1805 the BHL&P Militia was stationed at Prestonpans, and moved to Musselburgh about 17 June. During the summer of 1805, when Napoleon was massing his 'Army of England' at Boulogne for a projected invasion, the BHL&P Militia with 523 men in 7 companies under Lt-Col Sir George Warrender, 4th Baronet, was housed in Musselburgh Barracks. It was part of a militia brigade there that also included the Edinburgh, Forfarshire and Dumfriesshire regiments, under the command of Lt-Col John Wauchope of the Edinburgh Militia. Sir George Warrender had been commissioned as lieutenant-colonel on 11 March 1805.

From Musselburgh the regiment moved on 9 June 1807 to Haddington, then on 15 June 1808 crossed Scotland to Dumfries and in March 1809 to Glasgow. In May 1809 it was ordered into England, passing through Edinburgh at the end of the month and arriving at Colchester in Essex in mid-August. It then moved into Suffolk and were split between barracks at Ipswich and Woodbridge, camping on the nearby heaths during the summer months. Major Thomas Moncrieff, commissioned in the regiment on 2 August 1802, died at Woodbridge in April 1810.

The BHL&P Militia embarked from Walton Ferry near Felixstowe on 29 June 1811 to sail back to Leith in Scotland. It was in its home area of Haddington, Dunbar and Edinburgh until 18 February 1812 when it was ordered back to Western Scotland, arriving at Paisley on 21 February, Ayr Barracks on 8 March, and at Irvine on 2 May. It moved back to Paisley on 15 August and remained there for the rest of the year. In January 1813 it was at Kilmarnock, then on 20 April it was ordered to Newcastle upon Tyne, where it remained for the rest of the war, with detachments at Tynemouth and Carlisle.

The war ended with the abdication of Napoleon in April 1814 and the BHL&P Militia was disembodied at Coldstream on 20 August, leaving only the permanent staff. However, Napoleon's escape from Elba led to the short Hundred Days campaign, culminating in the Battle of Waterloo. The militia was re-embodied during this period while the bulk of the Regular Army was on active service and then occupation duty on the Continent. The BHL&P Militia was embodied at Coldstream on 10 July 1815 and moved to Queensberry House Barracks in Edinburgh the following month. In November it was stationed at Berwick-upon-Tweed. It was finally disembodied at Coldstream on 7 February 1816.

=== Long Peace ===
After Waterloo there was a long peace. The BHL&P Militia was called out for training in 1820, 1821, 1825 and 1831 but not thereafter. Although officers continued to be commissioned into the militia, the permanent staffs of sergeants and drummers (who were occasionally used to maintain public order) were progressively reduced. The Earl of Home died in 1841 and was succeeded in command by William Hay, a half-pay captain in the 15th Foot who had fought in the Peninsular War. George Home Logan-Home, a half-pay captain of the Royal Marines was appointed major of the corps on 21 May 1851. By 1850 the regimental HQ had moved from Coldstream to Dunse (Duns), the county town of Berwickshire.

== Militia Artillery ==
The long-standing national Militia of the United Kingdom was revived by the Militia Act 1852, enacted during a period of international tension. As before, units were raised and administered on a county basis, and filled by voluntary enlistment (although conscription by means of the Militia Ballot might be used if the counties failed to meet their quotas). Training was for 56 days on enlistment, then for 21–28 days per year, during which the men received full army pay. Under the act, Militia units could be embodied by royal proclamation for full-time home defence service in three circumstances:

1. 'Whenever a state of war exists between Her Majesty and any foreign power'.
2. 'In all cases of invasion or upon imminent danger thereof'.
3. 'In all cases of rebellion or insurrection'.

The Militia Act 1852 introduced Artillery Militia units in addition to the traditional infantry regiments. Their role was to man coastal defences and fortifications, relieving the Royal Artillery (RA) for active service.

The Berwick, Haddington Linlithgow and Peebles Militia was ordered to be converted to artillery in 1854, and this was carried out by March 1855. The establishment strength was 17 officers, 27 non-commissioned officers, and 415 gunners organised in four batteries, the quotas for the gunners distributed as follows:

- Berwickshire: 132
- Haddingtonshire: 130
- Linlithgowshire: 113
- Peeblesshire: 40

The Berwick Artillery was embodied for home defence during the Crimean War in February 1855 and was stationed at Dunbar. By October 1855 it was back at Dunse, where it remained until the end of the war. It was disembodied in August 1856.

=== Haddington Artillery ===
In August 1858 the unit was redesignated the Haddington, Berwick, Linlithgow and Peebles Artillery Militia reflecting a change in recruitment. Its HQ was now at Dunbar

After 1852 no new colonels were appointed to militia regiments; instead the lieutenant-colonel became commandant and the post of Honorary Colonel was created. Major Logan-Home was promoted to Lt-Col Commandant on 11 February 1860 and Col Hay became the Hon Col.

In 1874 the establishment strength of the corps was increased to 540 gunners in six batteries. By 1882 the permanent staff consisted of 2 officers and 24 other ranks (ORs).

The Artillery Militia was reorganised into 11 divisions of garrison artillery in 1882, and the Haddington unit became the 2nd Brigade, Scottish Division, RA on 1 April 1882. When the Scottish Division was abolished on 1 July 1889 the title was altered to Haddington Artillery (Southern Division) RA.

The recruiting area for the unit was widened beyond its original four counties, and in April 1894 it was redesignated the South-East of Scotland Artillery to reflect this.

From 1899 most units of the Militia artillery formally became part of the Royal Garrison Artillery (RGA), the unit formally taking the title of South-East of Scotland RGA (Militia) in 1902.

It was embodied for home defence during the Second Boer War from 15 May to 5 October 1900.

== Disbandment ==
After the Boer War, the future of the Militia was called into question. There were moves to reform the Auxiliary Forces (Militia, Yeomanry and Volunteers) to take their place in the six Army Corps proposed by St John Brodrick as Secretary of State for War. Some batteries of Militia Artillery were to be converted to field artillery. However, little of Brodrick's scheme was carried out.

Under the sweeping Haldane Reforms of 1908, the Militia was replaced by the Special Reserve, a semi-professional force whose role was to provide reinforcement drafts for Regular units serving overseas in wartime. All 7 officers and 212 out of 263 ORs of the South-East of Scotland RGA (M) accepted transfer to the Special Reserve Royal Field Artillery, the unit becoming the South-East of Scotland Royal Field Reserve Artillery on 12 July 1908. On 23 August that year the unit absorbed the Forfar and Kincardine RFRA. However, in a change of policy the following year, the RFRA units were scrapped, the SE Scotland being disbanded on 30 October 1909. Instead the men of the RFA Special Reserve would form Brigade Ammunition Columns for the Regular RFA brigades on the outbreak of war.

== Commanders ==
=== Colonels ===
The following served as Colonel of the Regiment:

- Alexander Home, 10th Earl of Home, appointed 5 October 1802
- William Hay 9 February 1842

=== Lieutenant-colonels ===
Lieutenant-Colonels (commandants from 1854) included:

- Sir George Warrender, 4th Baronet, 11 March 1805
- Vacant in 1850
- George Logan Home, formerly Royal Marines, appointed 11 February 1860
- Thomas Shairp of Houstoun, promoted
- James Grant Suttle, appointed 29 June 1875
- A. Dickson, appointed 19 February 1879
- J.R. Dawson, appointed 7 November 1885
- Thomas Alford Houstoun-Boswall-Preston, promoted 12 November 1892
- Charles T. Menzies, promoted 14 March 1903

=== Honorary Colonels ===
The following served as Honorary Colonel of the unit:

- Thomas Shairp of Houstoun, former CO, appointed 28 June 1876, died 1891
- Thomas Alford Houstoun-Boswall-Preston, former CO, appointed 22 March 1903

== Heritage & ceremonial ==
=== Uniforms & insignia ===
By 1814 the regiment wore red coats with yellow facings; these facings were retained until it became artillery in 1854. The ORs' coatee buttons bore the crowned star of the Order of the Thistle with the title 'BERWICKSHIRE' beneath.

When it converted to artillery the regiment adopted the blue coat and red facings of the Royal Artillery. About 1856 the corps wore a distinctive plume holder on the busbies: this consisted of a white metal flaming 'bomb', on the ball of which were the Royal Arms over a cannon with the intertwined letters 'BHLP'. From 1882 to 1889 the officers wore the standard gilt Scottish Division plate on their blue cloth Home Service helmet, with 'HADDINGTON ARTILLERY' replacing 'SCOTTISH DIVISION' on the lower scroll in 1889, until 1894 when 'SOUTH EAST OF SCOTLAND' appeared instead. About 1907 the ORs wore the brass titles 'RGA' over 'S.E.SCOTLAND' on the shoulder straps of their khaki service dress.

=== Precedence ===
At the start of the French Revolutionary War in 1793 the English counties balloted for the order of precedence of their militia regiments; when the Scottish ('North British') Militia were raised in 1798 they had their own separate order, with the Edinburgh regiment ranked 1st. Another ballot for precedence took place in 1803 at the beginning of the Napoleonic War, covering the whole of Great Britain, and this list remained in force until 1833. The Berwick, Haddington, Linlithgow & Peebles Militia was now ranked 1st.

In 1833 the King drew the lots for individual militia regiments across the whole of the United Kingdom. Regiments raised before the peace of 1783 took the first 69 places, followed by those raised for the French Revolutionary War: the BHL&P Militia ranked 73rd.

When the Artillery Militia was formed in 1853–55 the corps were listed in alphabetical order, the Berwick Artillery being 3rd.

== See also ==
- Scottish Militia
- Militia (United Kingdom)
- Militia Artillery units of the United Kingdom and Colonies
- Scottish Division, Royal Artillery
- Southern Division, Royal Artillery
- Queen's Edinburgh Light Infantry Militia
