= Jamie Douglas =

Jamie Douglas may refer to:

- Jamie Douglas (footballer) (born 1992), Northern Irish professional footballer
- Jamie Douglas (song), traditional ballad

== See also ==
- James Douglas (disambiguation)
