= Douglas Cause =

1760s court case in Scotland

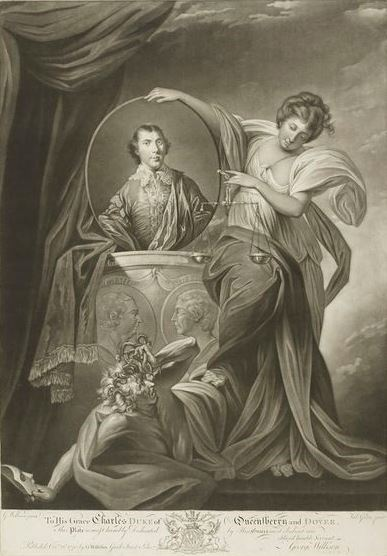
Print commemorating the victory of Archibald Douglas in the House of Lords. A portrait of Douglas appears in the medallion, supported on a plinth by a figure of Justice. The plinth bears two medallion portraits of the Lords Mansfield and Camden, who were judges in the case. At the foot of the plinth, trampled underfoot, lies the figure of Deceit, holding a mask.

The Douglas Cause was a cause célèbre and legal struggle in Scotland during the 1760s. The main parties were Archibald Douglas (1748–1827) and James Douglas-Hamilton, 7th Duke of Hamilton (1755–1769). The affair gripped the nation, leading to death threats and rioting.

== Background ==
Archibald Douglas, 3rd Marquess and 1st Duke of Douglas (1694–1761) had been raised to the dukedom by Queen Anne in 1703 at the age of nine in order to secure the loyalty of the powerful Clan Douglas to her new regime. The duke was virtually illiterate and took no part in the affairs of the nation. He lived largely as a recluse and may have suffered from insanity.

The duke remained unmarried until late in life and had no issue. His sister Lady Jane Douglas (1698–1753) was his putative heir. In the event of her remaining childless, most of the duke’s fortune along with a string of titles and ancient honours would pass to his kinsmen, the Dukes of Hamilton, who were descended in the male line from William Douglas, 1st Marquess of Douglas.

Until 1748, all looked set fair for the Hamiltons. The duke was unmarried, and although in 1746 Lady Jane had secretly married the unsuitable Colonel John Stewart, a penniless soldier of fortune, she was by then aged 48, and Colonel Stewart (described by the duke as a 'wore-out old rake') was 60. The marriage seemed unlikely to produce children.

Following their marriage, Colonel and Lady Jane Stewart travelled to the Continent to escape their creditors under the assumed name of "Gray". Two years later in the summer of 1748, Lady Jane admitted the marriage and gave out that she was heavily pregnant. It was subsequently reported that on 10 July at the house of Madame Le Brun in Faubourg Saint-Germain in Paris, she had given birth to twin sons – Archibald and Sholto. Lady Jane was 50 years old.

Encouraged by the Hamiltons, the duke refused to recognise the boys as his sister’s children and his heirs. He cut off her allowance and when the couple returned to Britain in 1751, Stewart was imprisoned for debt. Lady Jane and her son Sholto both died in 1753, and the young Archibald ended up in the care of his kinsman, Charles Douglas, 3rd Duke of Queensberry, who saw to his education.

In 1758, to general astonishment, the Duke of Douglas, then aged 63, married Margaret Douglas, a middle-aged distant relative. The Duchess of Douglas made it the main business of her remaining lifetime to redress the wrong done to Lady Jane. She prevailed upon the duke to investigate the circumstances of the case for himself, which he did at much expense and pains. In the end he was satisfied, expressed passionate remorse and revoked the existing entail of his estates, settling them upon Archibald Stewart in July 1761. Ten days later, the duke died.

While the Dukedom of Douglas expired along with the duke, the Marquessate of Douglas and the ancient Earldom of Angus devolved upon his nearest heir male, the six-year old James Douglas-Hamilton, 7th Duke of Hamilton. However, the duke’s castles, properties and extensive lands in eight Scottish counties passed to Archibald Stewart, then 13 years old. Stewart legally changed his surname to Douglas and duly entered into his inheritance, worth the remarkable sum of £12,000 per annum (the equivalent value of over £2.6 million in 2021).

== Litigation ==
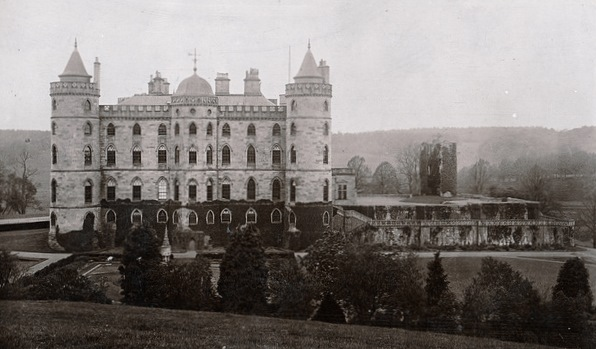
Douglas Castle, part of the inheritance contested between the parties.

With so much at stake, it was unsurprising that the Hamiltons contested the settlement. They dispatched Andrew Stuart of Torrance, a 'shady investigator', to Paris to investigate. He came back with the information that Archibald Douglas had been born ‘Jacques Louis Mignon’, the son of a glass worker, and had been kidnapped in July 1748 by ‘a lady, a gentleman and their maid’. He further claimed that the deceased Sholto Stewart was the son of ‘Sanry the Rope Dancer’, who had vanished in similar circumstances. Stuart also reported that witnesses to Lady Jane’s pregnancy could not be found, and that the couple had not stayed where they said they had.

In 1762, the Hamiltons launched an action in the Court of Session in Edinburgh claiming that Archibald Douglas’s identity had been fabricated and that he had no legal right to the Douglas inheritance. By 1767, each side had published memorials – 1,000 page statements of case, which incorporated letters, documents, witness reports, affidavits and citations of Scots and French law. A total of 24 lawyers read speeches to the 15 judges before whom the case was heard. The hearings lasted 21 days, making it the longest ever pleading before the Court of Session. For the legal profession, the case was a bonanza, eventually racking up costs estimated at £100,000.

There was immense public interest in the case throughout Europe. David Hume, Adam Smith and Samuel Johnson all supported Hamilton. Johnson’s biographer, James Boswell, disagreed and became a propagandist for Douglas, producing more than twenty articles and three books on the subject. The Edinburgh populace were also firmly on the side of Douglas, no doubt resentful at the prospect of Hamilton acquiring a second ducal fortune.

On 14 July 1767, the court gave its opinion. The lords of session were split down the middle, seven in favour of Hamilton and seven for Douglas. The Lord President, Robert Dundas, gave his casting vote in favour of Hamilton. As one contemporary observer, lawyer Robert Stewart wrote, ‘poor Douglas lost his cause yesterday by the president’s casting vote, leaving him without father or mother, sister or brother or any relation on Earth for the evidence on which he is condemned does not give him in law other parents’. The court's judgement was so unpopular that the president's life was threatened.

Douglas’s lawyers immediately launched an appeal to the House of Lords in London. The case opened in January 1769 and lasted more than a month. A reputed £100,000 worth of bets were waged on the outcome. During its progress, the Hamiltons’ investigator, Andrew Stuart, challenged one of Douglas’s lawyers Edward Thurlow to a duel for calling him a liar. Pistols were fired but both missed. The verdict, when it was finally delivered in February 1769, was unanimously in favour of Archibald Douglas.

Edinburgh went wild with joy. Mobs smashed the windows of the lords of session who had opposed Douglas, and plundered the Hamilton apartments in Holyroodhouse. For two days it was dangerous for opponents of Archibald Douglas to be in Edinburgh, and the military had to be called out to restore calm.

== Aftermath ==
Six years after the decision in 1775, Andrew Stuart published Letters to the Right Honourable Lord Mansfield. In these epistles, Stuart assailed the Earl of Mansfield, a judge in the case who had supported the claims of Douglas, for his want of impartiality. The force and eloquence of Stuart’s writing was compared at the time to that of Junius.

Archibald Douglas became one of the richest magnates in Scotland, but memories of the scandal lingered about him. It is noteworthy that he was not immediately ennobled as a high ranking peer, as might have been expected for someone of his wealth and family influence. It was not until 1790 that he was raised to the lowest rank of the peerage of Great Britain as Baron Douglas of Douglas.

== In popular culture and literature ==
The scandal was the subject of a 1971 play The Douglas Cause by William Douglas Home. Home was himself a direct descendant of Archibald Douglas. A number of books, legal treatises and memoirs have been written on the subject including:

- A Gentleman of Scotland, ed. (1768), Letters of... Lady Jane Douglas, A. Henderson
- FitzGerald, Percy Hetherington (1904), Lady Jean, The Romance of the Great Douglas Cause, T. F. Unwin
- Steuart, Archibald Francis (1909), The Douglas Cause, W. Hodge & Company
- De La Torre, Lillian (1952), The Heir of Douglas, Knopf, ISBN 0598590838
- Sabbagh, Karl (2014), The Trials of Lady Jane Douglas, Skyscraper Publications, ISBN 099262701X
