= Charles Gordon, 10th Marquess of Huntly =

Scottish peer and politician

The Most Honourable The Marquess of Huntly
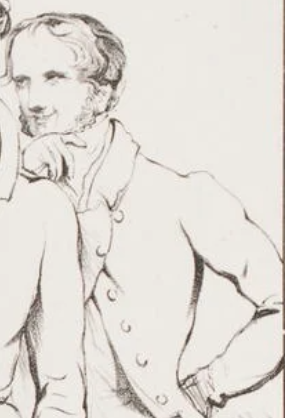
- Lord Strathavon cartooned by H.B. Doyle, 1828

Lord Lieutenant of Aberdeenshire
- In office 1861–1863
- Preceded by: The Earl of Aberdeen
- Succeeded by: The Earl of Kintore

Member of Parliament for Huntingdonshire
- In office 1830–1831 Serving with Viscount Mandeville
- Preceded by: William Fellowes; Viscount Mandeville
- Succeeded by: Edward Fellowes; George Thornhill

Member of Parliament for East Grinstead
- In office 1818–1830 Serving with George William Gunning, Charles Jenkinson, Viscount Holmesdale
- Preceded by: George William Gunning; Sir George Hope
- Succeeded by: Viscount Holmesdale; Frederick West

Personal details
- Born: Charles Gordon; 4 January 1792 Orton Longueville
- Died: 18 September 1863 (aged 71) Orton Longueville
- Party: Tory
- Spouses: Lady Elizabeth Conyngham (m. 1826; died 1839) Marie Antoinette Pegus (m. 1844)
- Children: 13, including Charles and Douglas
- Parent(s): George Gordon, 9th Marquess of Huntly; Catherine Cope
- Relatives: Charles Gordon, 4th Earl of Aboyne (grandfather)
- Education: St John's College, Cambridge

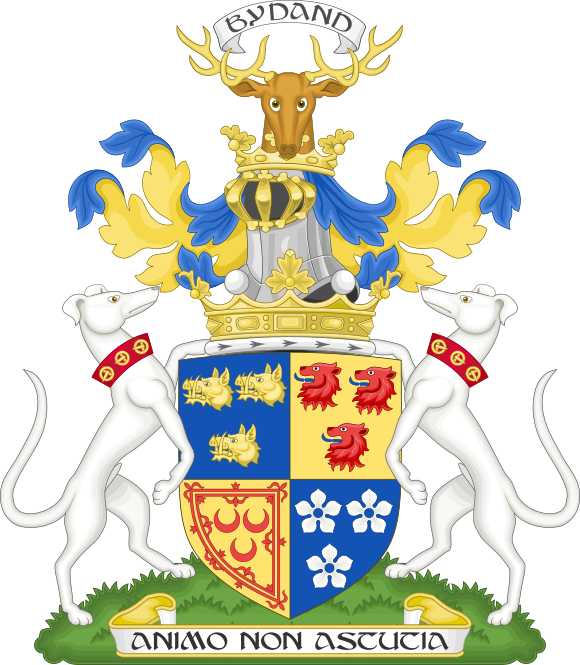
Heraldic achievement of the Marquess of Huntly, Chief of Clan Gordon

Charles Gordon, 10th Marquess of Huntly (4 January 1792 – 18 September 1863), styled Lord Strathavon from 1794 to 1836 and Earl of Aboyne from 1836 to 1853, was a Scottish peer, politician, courtier, and cricketer. He was a member of Parliament, first as a Tory (1818–1830) and then a Whig (1830 onwards).

== Early and political life ==
Huntly was born at Orton Longueville in 1792, the eldest son of the 5th Earl of Aboyne (later Marquess of Huntly) and his wife, Catherine Cope (of the Cope baronets of Bruern). His younger siblings included Lady Catherine Susan Gordon (wife of Charles Cavendish, 1st Baron Chesham); Lord George Gordon (the Rector of Chesterton who married Charlotte Anne Vaughan); Lady Charlotte Sophia Gordon; Lady Mary Gordon (who married Frederick Charles William Seymour, Esq., a son of Lord Hugh Seymour); Adm. Lord Frederick Gordon-Hallyburton (who married Lady Augusta FitzClarence, a sister of George FitzClarence, 1st Earl of Munster, and the daughter of King William IV and his mistress Dorothea Jordan); Maj. Lord Henry Gordon (who married Louisa Payne); Lord Cecil James Gordon-Moore (who married Emily Moore); and Lord Francis Gordon (who married Isabel Grant, a daughter of Lt.-Gen. Sir William Keir Grant).

He was educated at St John's College, Cambridge.

== Career ==
Gordon entered Parliament in 1818 as a Tory MP for East Grinstead before being elected as a Whig MP for Huntingdonshire in 1830.

From 1826 to 1830, he was a Lord of the Bedchamber during the reign of King George IV, and then a Lord-in-waiting from 1840 to 1841, his last office being that of Lord Lieutenant of Aberdeenshire from 1861 until his death.

Upon his father's death in 1853, he inherited the Marquessate of Huntly and the Earldom of Aboyne (both in the Peerage of Scotland) and the Meldrum Barony in the Peerage of the United Kingdom.

=== Cricket ===
Huntly played for Hampshire, Middlesex, Kent, Surrey, and the Marylebone Cricket Club (MCC) between 1819 and 1843. He also appeared in important matches for W Ward's XI, both the Players and the Gentlemen, a Married XI, Lord Strathavon's XI (his own team), and the Gentlemen of Kent. In 33 important matches, he scored a total of 193 runs, with a highest score of 19 against Oxford University, at a batting average of 4.02 runs per innings, only reaching double-figures on four occasions in 61 innings.

Huntly played for both the Players and the Gentlemen in the annual matches between the two teams, uniquely becoming the only member of the aristocracy to appear for the Players when he did so in 1819. This appears to have been due to him having placed a bet on the Players. He played for the Gentlemen in the fixture in 1827.

He was a member of MCC for around 50 years and its president in 1821–22. His brother, Francis Gordon, also played some cricket, including for MCC, and appeared alongside Huntly for the Gentlemen in 1827. The brother's father had been an early member of MCC.

== Personal life ==
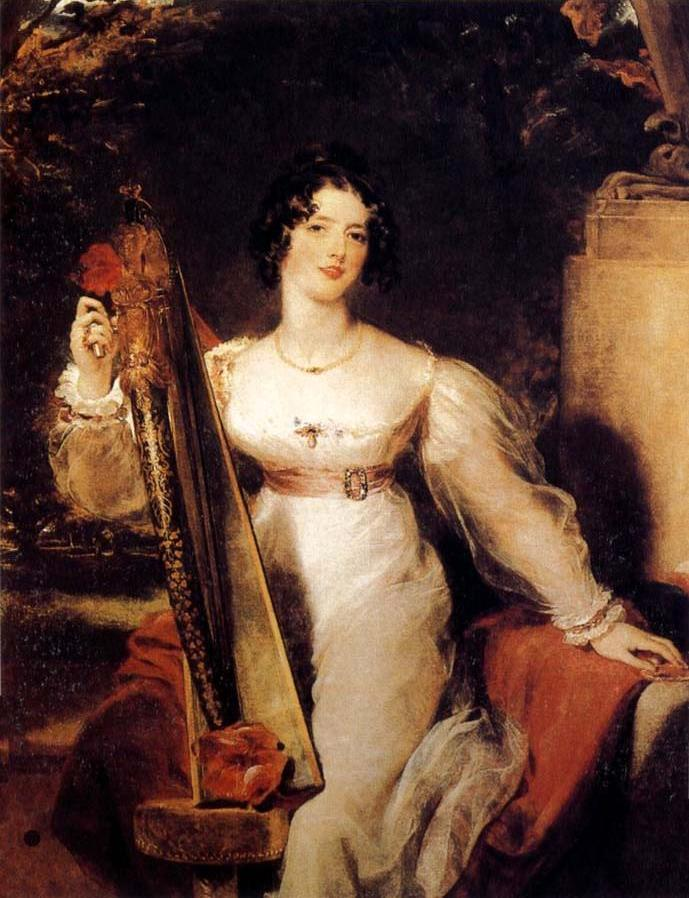
Portrait of Lady Elizabeth Conyngham by Sir Thomas Lawrence in the early 1820s, is in the Museu Calouste Gulbenkian, Lisbon.

In March 1826, he was married to Lady Elizabeth Conyngham, the eldest daughter of Henry Conyngham, 1st Marquess Conyngham, and the former Elizabeth Denison, King George IV's mistress. They did not have any children before her death in 1839.

At age 52, Huntly married Marie Antoinette Pegus (c. 1821–1893), the only surviving daughter of Rev. William Peter Pegus and the former Charlotte Susanna Layard (a daughter of Very Rev. Charles Layard, Dean of Bristol), whose family were West Indies planters of French Huguenot background. Marie was a half-sister of George Bertie, 10th Earl of Lindsey. With Marie, he had fourteen children, the last born five months after his death:

- Lady Mary Catherine Gordon (1845–1930), who married Edmund Turnor, in 1866.
- Lady Evelyn Elizabeth Gordon (1846–1921), who married Gilbert Heathcote-Drummond-Willoughby, 1st Earl of Ancaster, in 1863.
- Charles Gordon, 11th Marquess of Huntly (1847–1937), a Lord in Waiting, Captain of the Gentlemen at Arms, Privy Councillor and Lord Rector of the University of Aberdeen.
- Lord Lewis Gordon (1848–1870), who was lost at sea in HMS Captain.
- Lord Bertrand Gordon (1850–1869), who died unmarried.
- Lord Douglas William Cope Gordon (1851–1888), a Lt.-Col. and Member of Parliament.
- Lord Esmé Stuart Gordon (1853–1900), who married Elizabeth Anne Phippen Brown in 1874.
- Lady Grace Cecilie Gordon (1854–1941), who married Hugh Lowther, 5th Earl of Lonsdale in 1878.
- Lord Granville Armyne Gordon (1856–1907), who married Charlotte D'Olier Roe, a daughter of Henry Roe of Mount Dunville Park, in 1878.
- Lady Margaret Ethel Gordon (1858–1950), who married George Ormsby-Gore, 3rd Baron Harlech, in 1881.
- Lord Randolph Seaton Gordon (1859–1859), who died young.
- Lady Elena Mary Gordon (1861–1936), who married Maj. George Lamplugh Wickham of Wetherby, in 1885.
- Lady Edith Blanche Gordon (1861–1862).
- Lady Ethelreda Caroline Gordon (1864–1961), who married Lt.-Col. Henry Wickham of Oundle, youngest son of Lamplugh Wickham, in 1884.

Lord Huntly died at Orton Longueville 18 September 1863, aged 71. His titles passed to his eldest son, Charles. His widow died on 10 August 1893.

== Bibliography ==
- Carlaw, Derek (2020). Kent County Cricketers, A to Z: Part One (1806–1914) (PDF). Cardiff: ACS.

Parliament of the United Kingdom
Preceded by George William Gunning; Sir George Hope	Member of Parliament for East Grinstead; 1818–1830; With: George William Gunning 1812–1818; Charles Jenkinson 1818–1829; Viscount Holmesdale 1829–1832	Succeeded by Viscount Holmesdale; Frederick West
Preceded by William Fellowes; Viscount Mandeville	Member of Parliament for Huntingdonshire; 1830–1831; With: Viscount Mandeville	Succeeded by Edward Fellowes; George Thornhill
Honorary titles
Preceded by The Earl of Aberdeen	Lord Lieutenant of Aberdeenshire; 1861–1863	Succeeded by The Earl of Kintore
Peerage of Scotland
Preceded by George Gordon	Marquess of Huntly; 1853–1863	Succeeded by Charles Gordon
