= Frances Douglas, Lady Douglas =

British artist (1750-1817)

Frances Douglas, Lady Douglas (26 July 1750 – 31 March 1817), formerly Lady Frances Scott, was the wife of Archibald Douglas, 1st Baron Douglas, and the mother of novelist Caroline Lucy Scott. Like her brother, Henry Scott, 3rd Duke of Buccleuch, she was closely acquainted with the novelist Walter Scott. She was an amateur artist, some of whose works have survived.

== Early life ==
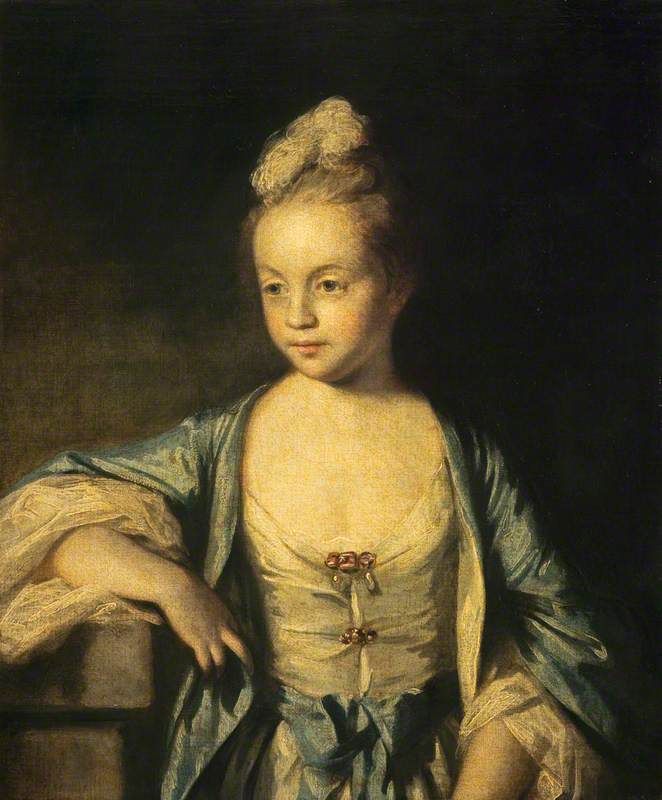
Joshua Reynolds, A Little Girl (possibly Lady Frances Scott, 1750–1817, Later Lady Douglas), National Galleries of Scotland

She was the daughter of Francis Scott, Earl of Dalkeith, and his wife the former Lady Caroline Campbell, who took the courtesy title of Countess of Dalkeith. Born three months after her father's death, she was reportedly shown little affection by her mother, who appeared "insensible to her merits", according to her own sister, Lady Mary Coke. A portrait of Lady Frances with her brothers was painted by Sir Joshua Reynolds in about 1758, and is thought to be the same work held by the National Gallery of Scotland.

In 1755, the Countess remarried, her second husband being the politician Charles Townshend, who took an interest in Frances as her step-father and supervised her education.

== Literary society ==
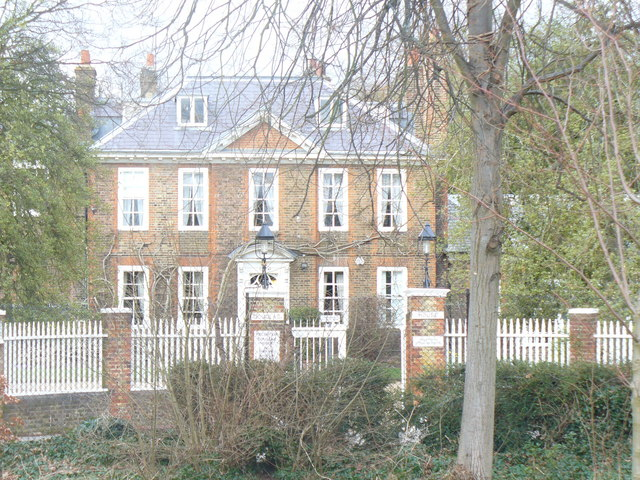
Douglas House viewed from Petersham Avenue, Petersham, London

In 1767, Frances travelled to Scotland for her brother's wedding; she remained at Dalkeith Palace for some time. She met Alexander Carlyle, minister at Inveresk, and they developed a friendship. He appreciated her wit and good taste. The corresponded, enjoying her skill as a belletrist. While she was away, Townshend died, and Douglas lost his guidance and protection. She thrived, though, in the literary society of the palace.

Her aunt Lady Jane Scott died in 1779 and left her a manor (now called Douglas House) in Petersham, London and a considerable financial inheritance. In 1782, Douglas and her brother traveled to Dublin and stayed with Lady Carlow. She was the sister of Lady Louisa Stuart, who was a close friend. While in Ireland, she met with Anne Townshend, her stepsister, who needed help sorting out the financial difficulties from an unfortunate marriage.

== Marriage and children ==
On 13 May 1783, Frances married Archibald Douglas, at Grosvenor Square, London. Archibald, described as a 'safe ... and comfortable man', was married to her friend, Lady Lucy Graham, until her death in 1780. Part of the attraction for her marriage to Archibald was the affectionate relationship she had with his four children.

The couple had six children:

- Frances Elizabeth Douglas (died 1854), who married William Moray-Stirling, 17th of Abercairny, and had no children
- Mary Sidney Douglas, who married Robert Douglas and had no children
- Hon. Caroline Lucy Douglas (1784–1857), who married Admiral Sir George Scott, K.C.B., and had no children; she became known as a novelist
- Hon. Sholto Scott Douglas (1785–1821)
- Reverend James Douglas, 4th Baron Douglas (1787–1857), who married Wilhelmina Murray. He inherited the title of Baron Douglas following the death of his elder half-brothers, but had no children and the title then became extinct
- Hon. George Douglas (1788–1838)

Their family home was Bothwell Castle, where she entertained poets and authors in an atmosphere of 'ease, comfort and gaiety'. She entertained the French émigré aristocracy. Guest also included M. G. Lewis, Mary Berry, and Sir Walter Scott, who met Lady Louisa Stuart there in 1799.

== Literature ==
Lady Louisa later suggested that Scott had based the character of Jeanie Deans in The Heart of Midlothian partly on Frances. Lady Louisa's memoir of Frances was written for the benefit of her family and was not published until 1985. The National Archives holds correspondence between Frances and her friend Dorothy Bentinck, Duchess of Portland, dating between 1766 and 1771.
