= Alexander Home, 9th Earl of Home =

The Reverend Alexander Home, 9th Earl of Home (died on 8 October 1786) was a Scottish nobleman and clergyman.

== Background ==
Lord Home was the second surviving son of Alexander Home, 7th Earl of Home and Lady Anne Kerr, the daughter of Lieutenant-General William Kerr, 2nd Marquess of Lothian and Lady Jane Campbell. He succeeded to the titles of 14th Lord Home, 9th Lord Dunglass and 9th Earl of Home on the death of his elder brother, William in 1761.

== Family ==
Home married firstly, in 1757, Primrose Elphinstone, daughter of Charles, 9th Lord Elphinstone and Elizabeth Primrose. The couple had a son, William, Lord Dunglass, who served as an officer in the Coldstream Guards during the American Revolutionary War, and who died circa 17 March 1781, from wounds received in the Battle of Guilford Court House.

Lord Home married secondly, his cousin Marion Home, daughter of Hon. James Home and Zerobabel Haig of Bemersyde.

He married thirdly, on 10 February 1768, Abigail Browne Ramey, daughter of John Ramey of Yarmouth. The couple had two daughters and a son, Alexander Ramey-Home, who later succeeded to the earldom.

Peerage of Scotland
Preceded by William Home	Earl of Home; 1761–1786	Succeeded by Alexander Home
