= Drummond-Stewart baronets =

Extinct baronetcy in the Baronetage of Nova Scotia

The title of Baronet of Blair and Balcaskie in the county of Fife, was created on 2 June 1683 in the Baronetage of Nova Scotia for Thomas Stewart of Balcaskie, a Lord of Session. He was son of Henry Stewart and grandson of Sir William Stewart, 11th of Grantully and Murthly, both in Perthshire. 1st of Grantully was Sir John Stewart, Lord of Lorne, great-great-grandson of Alexander Stewart, 4th High Steward of Scotland. Murthly had been acquired by the family in 1615.

== Baronets, of Blair and Balcaskie (1683) ==
- Sir Thomas Stewart, 1st Baronet (died by 1717)
  - He married in 1682 Lady Jean Mackenzie, daughter of George Mackenzie, 1st Earl of Cromartie, and was the father of the second and third baronets.
- Sir George Stewart, 2nd Baronet (1686–1759)
  - He inherited Grantully following the death of his cousin John Stewart, 13th of Grantully, but died unmarried.
- Sir John Stewart, 3rd Baronet (1687–1764)
  - While still a penniless younger son, the third Baronet had married secretly Lady Jane Douglas, sister of Archibald Douglas, 1st Duke of Douglas, and was later imprisoned for debt. By his first wife Elizabeth, daughter of Sir James Mackenzie, 1st Baronet of Royston, he was father of the 4th Baronet; by Lady Jane he was father of Archibald, who adopted the name of Douglas and after extensive litigation (known as the Douglas Cause) succeeded to the Duke's estates and was created Baron Douglas of Douglas.
- Sir John Stewart, 4th Baronet (c. 1726 - 1797)
  - He was married in 1749 to Clementina Stewart, daughter of Charles Stewart of Ballechin, and was father of the 5th Baronet.
- Sir George Stewart, 5th Baronet (1750–1827)
  - He was married in 1792 to Catherine Drummond, daughter of John Drummond of Logiealmond and sister of Sir William Drummond of Logiealmond, by whom he was the father of the sixth, seventh and eighth baronets, two other sons, and two daughters. They all were given the middle name Drummond after their mother's family.
- Sir John Archibald Drummond Stewart, 6th Baronet (1794–1838)
  - He married Lady Jane Stuart, daughter of Francis Stuart, 10th Earl of Moray, but died without issue. His widow remarried and was the mother of the 19th Lady Gray.
- Sir William Drummond Stewart, 7th Baronet (1795–1871)
  - He served with the 6th Dragoon Guards in the Peninsular War and the Waterloo Campaign, and was awarded the Portuguese Order of Christ. In 1830 he married Christina Mary Stewart. He transferred to the 15th Hussars, and later travelled in America with the mountain men. On succeeding to the baronetcy he introduced buffalo to Murthly and restored the Roman Catholic chapel there. His son George Stewart served with the 93rd Highlanders in the Crimean War and the Indian Mutiny, where he was awarded the Victoria Cross, but predeceased his father.
- Sir Archibald Douglas Drummond Stewart, 8th Baronet (1807–1890)
  - He married Hester Mary Fraser in 1875, but had no children, and on his death the baronetcy became extinct. Grantully was inherited by the Fothringham family, descended from Marjory, daughter of Thomas Stewart, 12th of Grantully.

== Arms ==
Coat of arms of Drummond-Stewart of Blair and Balcaskie
Crest Two bees counter-volant Proper. Escutcheon Quarterly, 1st and 4th: Or, a fesse chequé Azure and Argent between three buckles in chief of the Second, and a galley, her oars in action, in base Sable (Stewart); 2nd: Or, three bars, within a bordure all wavey Gules (Drummond); 3rd: quarterly, i: Or a rock in flames Proper; ii: Azure, a buck's head cabossed Or; iii: Gules, three legs of a man armed proper, conjoined in the center at the upper part of the thighs, flexed in a triangle, garnished and spurred Or; iv: Argent, on a pale Sable, an imperial crown, within a double tressure, flowered and counter-flowered with a fleurs-de-lis Gules; all within a bordure Ermine (Mackenzie) Motto Provyd

== See also ==
- Stewart baronets
- List of baronetcies in the Baronetage of Nova Scotia
