= Donald Ogilvy =

Scottish politician

Colonel the Honourable Donald Ogilvy (27 May 1788 – 30 December 1863) of Clova in Forfarshire was a Scottish politician and military officer.

== Biography ==
Ogilvy's father Walter Ogilvy, who had inherited estates in both Forfarshire and Perthshire, styled himself the Earl of Airlie. The title which had been attainted twice, through the family's involvement in both the Jacobite rising of 1715 and the 1745 rising. The attainder was lifted in 1826, allowing Donald's elder brother David to resume the title.

Ogilvy joined the army of the East India Company (EIC) in 1804–05 as a cadet, and on arrival in India in 1806 was appointed as an Ensign in the 16th Bengal Native Infantry. He was promoted to Lieutenant and saw action in the operations against Gopal Singh in Bundelkhand. But promotion in the EIC was slow, so he resigned in 1813 and settled in Scotland, first in Fettercairn, and then from 1820 at Clova. He had been commissioned in 1809 as a Major in the Forfar and Kincardine Militia, and in 1828 he was appointed Colonel of the regiment.

At the 1830 general election he contested the Perth Burghs, losing to John Stuart-Wortley. Wortley was unseated on petition, but the resulting by-election was contested by Ogilvy's brother William Ogilvy.

Donald was elected at a by-election in October 1831 as the Member of Parliament (MP) for Forfarshire, at a by-election following the sitting MP William Maule's elevation to the peerage. However, he was unseated on petition in January 1832, and did not stand for Parliament again.

In the 1830s he is listed as living at 4 Atholl Crescent in Edinburgh's West End.

In February 1815 he married Maria, fourth daughter of James Morley of Kempshott Park. She died in 1843. They had seven children, including Walter (1822–94), who served as an army officer, and Donald (1824–85) who succeeded to the estates at Clova.

Parliament of the United Kingdom
Preceded by William Maule	Member of Parliament for Forfarshire; 1831 – 1832	Succeeded by Lord Douglas Gordon-Hallyburton
