= Forfar and Kincardine Militia =

Auxiliary unit of the British Army

Forfarshire Militia Forfar and Kincardine Militia Forfar and Kincardine Artillery 5th Brigade, Scottish Division, RA Forfar and Kincardine RGA (M)
- Active: 1798–1908
- Country: Kingdom of Great Britain (1798–1800); United Kingdom (1801–1908)
- Branch: Militia
- Type: Infantry/Garrison artillery
- Size: 1 Battalion/8 Batteries
- Part of: Scottish Division, RA; Southern Division, RA
- Garrison/HQ: Montrose

The Forfarshire Militia, later the Forfar and Kincardine Militia was an auxiliary regiment recruited in the Scottish counties of Forfarshire and Kincardineshire from 1798. It served in home defence and on internal security duties across the British Isles through all Britain's major wars. In 1854 it was converted into an artillery corps that continued until 1908.

== Scottish Militia ==
The universal obligation to military service in the Shire levy was long established in Scotland: all men aged from 16 to 60 were obliged to serve for a maximum of 40 days in any one year if required, and their arms and equipment were inspected at regular Wapenshaws. In time of war they would be called out by proclamation and by riders galloping through towns and villages bearing the 'Fiery Cross'.

After the restoration of Charles II, the Scottish Parliament passed an Act in 1661, ratified in 1663, creating a militia of 20,000 infantry and 2000 horse, available for Crown service anywhere in Scotland, England or Ireland. These troops were called out in 1689 after the Glorious Revolution. Thereafter the militia in Scotland, as in England, was allowed to decline. After the Jacobite Rising of 1715 a Disarming Act was passed in Scotland and although some militia served in the Government forces against the Jacobite Rising of 1745 there was a reluctance to leave weapons in the hands of those who might rebel.

The English Militia were conscripted by ballot, and this was revived in 1757 during the Seven Years' War. However, there were residual fears of Jacobitism in Scotland, so rather than embody the moribund militia, full-time regiments of 'Fencibles' were raised for the duration of the war by means of normal recruitment. Scotland relied on Fencibles again during the War of American Independence and the early stages of the French Revolutionary War.

== Forfar and Kincardine Militia ==
Finally, in 1797 Parliament passed an Act introducing the militia ballot in Scotland. This measure was unpopular and there were anti-ballot riots in the west of the country, but volunteers and paid substitutes were accepted. Ten regiments of Scottish militia were raised in 1798 under the 1797 Act, including the Forfarshire Militia formed at Montrose. The Lord Lieutenant of Forfarshire, Archibald Douglas, 1st Baron Douglas, previously commander of the Angusshire Regiment of Fencible Infantry, was appointed Colonel, with the rank of Brevet Colonel in the army while the regiment was embodied.

The French Revolutionary Wars saw the militia embodied for long periods and they became regiments of full-time professional soldiers (though restricted to service in Great Britain), which the Regular Army increasingly saw as a prime source of recruits. They served in coast defences, manning garrisons, guarding prisoners of war, and carried out internal security duty.

The war ended with the signing of the Treaty of Amiens in March 1802 and the militia regiments could be disembodied, leaving only the permanent staff of non-commissioned officers (NCOs) and drummers under the regimental adjutant. During the brief period of peace the militia was reorganised. The Forfarshire regiment widened its recruitment area and it was designated the Forfarshire and Kincardine Militia, soon afterwards shortened to Forfar and Kincardine Militia. Its establishment was 511 privates drawn from Forfarshire and 136 from Kincardineshire, for a total of 647. The Hon Archibald Douglas, son of Lord Douglas, was appointed colonel of the regiment in 1802, with his brother the Hon Charles Douglas as the junior major.

=== Napoleonic Wars ===
The Peace of Amiens was short-lived and Britain declared war on France once more on 18 May 1803. The Forfar and Kincardine regiment had already been embodied at Montrose on 6 April 1803, and on 21 June its establishment strength was raised to 970 (reverting to 647 in 1805 after a new Act of Parliament encouraged militiamen in excess of the quota to volunteer for the Regular Army). On 1 July 1803 it moved to Musselburgh, where it went into camp for the summer. From 8 November it was billeted in Musselburgh town. During the summer of 1805, when Napoleon was massing his 'Army of England' at Boulogne for a projected invasion, the Forfar and Kincardine Militia with 918 men in 10 companies under Lt-Col Robert W. Duff was quartered in Musselburgh, Fisherwick and Inveresk. It was part of a militia brigade based at Musselburgh that also included the Berwickshire, Dumfriesshire and Edinburgh regiments, all under the command of Lt-Col John Wauchope of the Edinburgh Militia.

The Forfar and Kincardine Militia finally left Musselburgh on 13 October 1806 and moved to Glasgow Barracks, where it was quartered until 5 March 1807 when it moved to Stirling Castle. On 14 November 1807 its establishment was ordered to be 1049. It next moved to Edinburgh Castle on 11 June 1808, and then Berwick-upon-Tweed on 19 May 1809. It moved to Dunbar on 7 May 1810, followed by Newcastle upon Tyne on 28 May 1810 and Tynemouth on 10 June 1811. The establishment was reduced to quota again on 17 September 1811 after further recruitment to the Regulars. By 2 November 1812 the regiment was on the move to Stockport, travelling on to Manchester on 27 January 1813.

In 1811 an 'Interchange Act' had been passed, allowing British militia units to volunteer for service in Ireland and vice versa. The Forfar and Kincardine regiment volunteered for this service in 1814. It left Manchester on 28 March 1814 and sailed to Ireland. There it was quartered at Clonoony Barracks until 6 July when it moved to Naas Barracks.

The war ended with the abdication of Napoleon in April 1814, and the regiment remained in Ireland awaiting disembodiment. At this time the Hon Archibald Douglas was still colonel but his brother the Hon Charles Douglas was now the Lieutenant-Colonel. Napoleon escaped from Elba early in 1815, initiating the Hundred Days Campaign. Disembodiment of the militia was halted (and other regiments re-embodied) and units remained in service after the Battle of Waterloo while large numbers of Regular troops were retained on occupation duties in Continental Europe. The Forfar & Kincardine remained at Naas until 12 September 1815 when it moved to Downpatrick. It finally left Downpatrick on 2 March 1816 and returned to Scotland to be disembodied.

=== Long peace ===
After Waterloo there was another long peace. Although officers continued to be commissioned into the militia and ballots were still held, the regiments were rarely assembled for training and the permanent staffs of non-commissioned officers and drummer (who were occasionally used to maintain public order) were progressively reduced. Donald Ogilvy, who had been major since 1809, was promoted to colonel on 28 February 1828. On 11 November 1834, Sir Alexander Ramsay, 2nd Baronet, who had first been commissioned into the regiment as an ensign on 14 September 1803, was promoted to Lieutenant-Colonel.

== Forfar and Kincardine Artillery Militia ==
The Militia of the United Kingdom was revived by the Militia Act 1852, enacted during a renewed period of international tension. As before, units were raised and administered on a county basis, and filled by voluntary enlistment (although conscription by means of the Militia Ballot might be used if the counties failed to meet their quotas). Training was for 56 days on enlistment, then for 21–28 days per year, during which the men received full army pay. Under the Act, Militia units could be embodied by Royal Proclamation for full-time home defence service in three circumstances:

1. 'Whenever a state of war exists between Her Majesty and any foreign power'.
2. 'In all cases of invasion or upon imminent danger thereof'.
3. 'In all cases of rebellion or insurrection'.

The 1852 Act introduced Artillery Militia units in addition to the traditional infantry regiments. Their role was to man coastal defences and fortifications, relieving the Royal Artillery (RA) for active service. The Forfar and Kincardine Militia was converted to artillery in March 1854. The new quotas assigned were 649 gunners to be raised from Forfarshire and 127 from Kincardineshire, for a total of 868 all ranks, the headquarters remaining at Montrose.

=== Crimean War and Indian Mutiny ===
The outbreak of the Crimean War in 1854 and the despatch of an expeditionary force led to the militia being called out for home defence. The new Forfar and Kincardine Artillery Militia was embodied in February 1855. It remained training at Montrose until the autumn, when it moved to garrison Fort George on the Moray Firth. The unit volunteered for garrison service in the Mediterranean, Malta and Gibraltar, but the offer was not taken up. It was still at Fort George when the war ended with the Treaty of Paris on 30 March 1856, and it was disembodied in May. No new colonels were appointed to militia units after 1852, and David Laird, a former lieutenant in the 72nd Highlanders, was appointed Lieutenant-Colonel Commandant on 16 September 1857.

The Forfar and Kincardine was one of a few artillery militia corps that were mobilised for home defence when an expeditionary force went to suppress the Indian Mutiny. It was embodied in November 1857 and ordered to Kinsale in Ireland. It then moved to Dundalk, and was at Limerick by April 1858. The unit had returned to Montrose by June, but remained embodied. It then went back to Ireland, being stationed at Dublin by September. During October it returned to garrison Kinsale.

In May 1859 the Forfar and Kincardine Artillery moved to the Sheerness defences in Kent, where it remained for the rest of its embodiment. All the remaining militia artillery were scheduled to be disembodied in April 1860; by now some had been embodied for three years and were considered well trained. In an effort to retain some of this trained manpower, the Secretary of State for War, Sidney Herbert, accepted a proposal by the Earl of Donoughmore, Lt-Col Commandant of the Tipperary Artillery Militia, that certain embodied militia artillery units should be transferred to the regular Royal Artillery (RA). The plan was to form an Irish brigade from the Tipperary Artillery, and another from the Forfar and Kincardine at Sheerness. However, there was an outcry from RA officers that militia officers without professional training would gain regular commissions and might outrank RA officers trained at the Royal Military Academy, Woolwich. After debate in the House of Lords the proposal was dropped. The Forfar and Kincardine Artillery was disembodied as scheduled in April 1860.

The militia now settled into a routine of annual training. The units had a large cadre of permanent staff and a number of the officers were former Regulars. Around a third of the recruits and many young officers went on to join the Regular Army. The Militia Reserve introduced in 1867 consisted of present and former militiamen who undertook to serve overseas in case of war. Following the Cardwell Reforms a mobilisation scheme began to appear in the Army List from December 1875. This assigned places in an order of battle of the 'Garrison Army' to Militia Artillery units: the Forfar and Kincardine Artillery's war station was in the Portsmouth defences.

=== 5th Brigade, Scottish Division, RA ===
The RA was reorganised in 1882, and 11 territorial divisions of garrison artillery were formed, each with a brigade of regular artillery. The Militia Artillery was assigned to form the junior brigades of these divisions, the Forfar and Kincardine Artillery becoming 5th Brigade, Scottish Division, RA, on 1 April 1882. By then recruiting was so good that with over 800 men enrolled in 8 batteries, and 32 permanent staff, the brigade was one of the largest militia artillery corps in the country.

On 1 July 1889 the garrison artillery was reorganised again, into three large territorial divisions (Eastern, Southern and Western). The assignment of units to them seemed geographically arbitrary, with all the Scottish militia units being grouped in the Southern Division, for example, but this related to where the need for coastal artillery was greatest, rather than where the units recruited. The unit at Montrose became the Forfar and Kincardine Artillery (Southern Division). In 1899 the garrison artillery units formally became the Royal Garrison Artillery (RGA).

During the Second Boer War militia artillery units were embodied to replace regular troops sent to South Africa. The Forfar & Kincardine Artillery was embodied at Montrose on 7 May 1900 and disembodied on 6 October that year.

In June 1902 the unit formally became the Forfar and Kincardine Royal Garrison Artillery (Militia).

== Special Reserve ==
After the Boer War, the future of the Militia was called into question. There were moves to reform the Auxiliary Forces (Militia, Yeomanry and Volunteers) to take their place in the six Army Corps proposed by St John Brodrick as Secretary of State for War. Some batteries of Militia Artillery were to be converted to Royal Field Artillery (RFA). However, little of Brodrick's scheme was carried out.

Under the sweeping Haldane Reforms of 1908, the Militia was replaced by the Special Reserve (SR), a semi-professional force whose role was to reinforce Regular units serving overseas in wartime, rather like the former Militia Reserve. Most RGA (M) units were converted to RFA. By now the strength of the Forfar and Kincardine RGA had dwindled to just over 200 ORs, but of these more than three quarters agreed to transfer to the SR. They were amalgamated into the South-East Scotland Royal Field Reserve Artillery (originally the Berwickshire Militia) on 23 August 1908. However, in a change of policy the following year, the RFRA units were scrapped, the SE Scotland being disbanded on 30 October 1909. Instead the men of the RFA Special Reserve would form Brigade Ammunition Columns for the Regular RFA brigades on the outbreak of war.

== Commanders ==
=== Colonels ===
The following served as Colonel of the Regiment:

- Archibald Douglas, 1st Baron Douglas, from raising
- Hon Archibald Douglas, appointed 13 October 1802
- Donald Ogilvy, promoted 28 February 1828

=== Lieutenant-Colonels ===
Lieutenant-Colonels of the regiment (Lt-Col Commandant from 1852) included:

- Robert W. Duff, 15 October 1802.
- Hon Charles Douglas, promoted by 1815
- Sir Alexander Ramsay, 2nd Baronet, promoted 11 November 1834
- David Laird, former lieutenant 72nd Highlanders, appointed 16 September 1857
- Reginald Howard Alexander Ogilvy (later 10th Baronet of Inverquharity), promoted 1 June 1872, became Hon Col 19 September 1894
- Charles Carnegie, 10th Earl of Southesk (as Lord Carnegie), promoted 28 November 1894
- Hon Charles Maule Ramsay, former lieutenant Royal Artillery, promoted 14 December 1906

=== Honorary Colonels ===
The following served as Honorary Colonel of the regiment:

- Sir Reginald Howard Alexander Ogilvy, 10th Baronet, former CO, appointed 19 September 1894

=== Other notable officers ===
- Arthur Ramsay, 14th Earl of Dalhousie, commissioned as 2nd Lieutenant 10 June 1897, transferred to the Scots Guards 10 February 1900 with which he served during World War I
- Hon Douglas Kinnaird, Master of Kinnaird, commissioned as 2nd Lt 14 December 1898, served with the Scots Guards in World War I and killed in action 24 October 1914
- Edward Bruce, 10th Earl of Elgin (as Lord Bruce), commissioned as 2nd Lt 1 May 1900, promoted to Captain 23 May 1908, served as Lt-Col in the Highland (Fifeshire) Heavy Battery, RGA during World War I
- Hon Robert Bruce, brother of above, commissioned as 2nd Lt 20 February 1901, transferred to 11th Hussars 25 March 1902
- Alexander Fraser, 20th Lord Saltoun (as Master of Saltoun) commissioned as 2nd Lt 10 July 1905; served as major in the Gordon Highlanders during World War I

== Heritage & ceremonial ==
=== Uniforms & insignia ===
From 1812 at least, the uniform of the Forfar & Kincardine Militia was a red coat with yellow facings. The officers' shoulder belt plate of ca 1800 was a gilt oval engraved with the star of the Order of the Thistle with the title 'FORFARSHIRE' below. An other ranks' pewter button of ca 1840 has the letters N.B.M. (for 'North British Militia') over F.K., all within a crowned spray of thistle.

When the regiment was converted to artillery in 1854 it adopted the blue RA uniform with red facings. As early as 1856 the corps had its own Pipe band. The pipers' white metal badge consisted of a field gun within a crowned garter inscribed 'FORFAR AND KINCARDINE ARTILLERY', the whole surrounded by a wreath of thistles and worn on a black cloth backing. The silver plume holder on the officers' busbies at this time had a similar design superimposed on a 'bomb', with the garter replaced by a simple circle inscribed 'FORFAR & KINCARDINE ARTILLERY' and the thistle wreath replaced by laurel wreath. The early pattern (ca 1854–74) officers' pouch has a while metal field gun on a blue backing within an embroidered oval inscribed 'FORFAR & KINCARDINE ARTILLERY' surrounded by a wreath of oak and laurel leaves. Later a standard RA pouch was worn, with a scroll inscribed 'FORFAR & KINCARDINE ARTILLERY' beneath the royal arms and gun. Similarly the officers' Home Service helmet bore the standard Scottish Division plate with the same lower scroll. In 1907 the other ranks wore brass titles with 'RGA' over 'F&K' on the shoulder straps of the khaki service dress.

=== Precedence ===
When they were formed in 1798 the Scottish Militia regiments were given their own order of precedence, in which Forfar came 8th. In 1803 a single militia precedence list was established by lot for counties in Great Britain, with Forfar coming 11th. In 1833 King William IV himself drew the lots for a new list for individual militia regiments across the United Kingdom. The first 69 places went to the regiments formed before 1783, the next 60 were those formed during the French revolutionary war: the Forfar & Kincardine came out as 105th. When the Militia Artillery were formed after 1852 they received their own order of precedence, in which the Forfar & Kincardine came 13th. Most regiments paid little attention to the number.

== See also ==
- Militia (Great Britain)
- Militia (United Kingdom)
- Militia Artillery units of the United Kingdom and Colonies
- Scottish Division, Royal Artillery
- Southern Division, Royal Artillery
