= Lady Jane Douglas =

Scottish noblewoman (1698–1753)

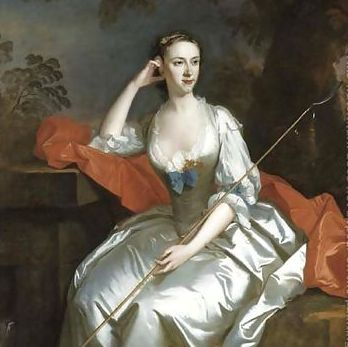
- detail of painting by Allan Ramsay
- Born: 17 March 1698
- Died: 21 November 1753 (aged 55); Edinburgh
- Father: James Douglas, 2nd Marquess of Douglas
- Mother: Lady Mary Kerr

Lady Jane Douglas (17 March 1698 – 21 November 1753) was a Scottish noblewoman. She married secretly and had twins abroad at the age of fifty who would inherit the family's riches. This birth was thought incredible and the ensuing long and expensive court case was fought in three countries and it was settled in her favour by the House of Lords in 1769, over 15 years after her death.

== Family background ==
Lady Jane Douglas was the daughter of James Douglas, 2nd Marquess of Douglas and the only sibling of Archibald Douglas, third marquess and first duke of Douglas. Her maternal grandfather was Robert Kerr, 1st Marquess of Lothian. The Scottish physician James McMath dedicated his 1694 book The Expert Mid-Wife to Lady Jane Douglas' mother Lady Mary Kerr or Ker, the "Lady Marquise of Douglas". Mary Kerr was the second wife of the Marquess, they married in 1692.

== Life ==
When she was 22 the Duchess of Queensberry thwarted the plan for her to marry Francis Scott, 2nd Duke of Buccleuch, by marrying him, coincidentally, to another Lady Jane Douglas who was the daughter of James Douglas, 2nd Duke of Queensberry and the duchess's sister-in-law.

Despite several earls and dukes wanting to be suitors this Jane Douglas refused their proposals. She was able to live due to the support of her brother, and possibly to spite him, she started a romance with the penniless Colonel John Stewart of Grantully, but broke off the courtship having previously said that she had an 'aversion' to the married state. After a decade she wrote to him, saying she would admit their friendship publicly if he wanted to visit her again and she and the colonel were married in 1746 at Drumsheugh without the knowledge of her brother.

== Douglas Cause ==
In the middle of 1748 she admitted the marriage and gave out the news that she was heavily pregnant. She gave birth in Paris where the couple had moved to escape their creditors. But there is some doubt as to whether her baby or babies died and were replaced by her husband, with or without her knowledge, after he sought French mothers who were willing to sell or give away their babies. One of these children would inherit the family's riches. The suspicion that the children she took back to Scotland were not 'born of her body' led the Hamilton family, who were the next heirs, to appoint lawyers to investigate the circumstances of the Paris events at the time of the alleged birth or births.

Douglas and one of her twin children, Sholto Stewart, died in Edinburgh in 1753.

The ensuing long and expensive court case over the family's inheritance with Duke of Hamilton became known as the Douglas Cause. The court case started in 1761 and involved judges in Scotland, England and France. It was eventually settled in the son's favour by the House of Lords in February 1769. Swayed by the speech of the Lord Chancellor, Lord Mansfield, who it turned out had known Lady Jane and lent her money, the lords overturned the previous judgement made two years before in Scotland and awarded the Douglas estates to Archibald Douglas, 1st Baron Douglas. The inheritance included Douglas Castle, which later descended to Alec Douglas-Home, British Prime Minister.
