= Cospatrick Douglas-Home, 11th Earl of Home =

British diplomat and politician

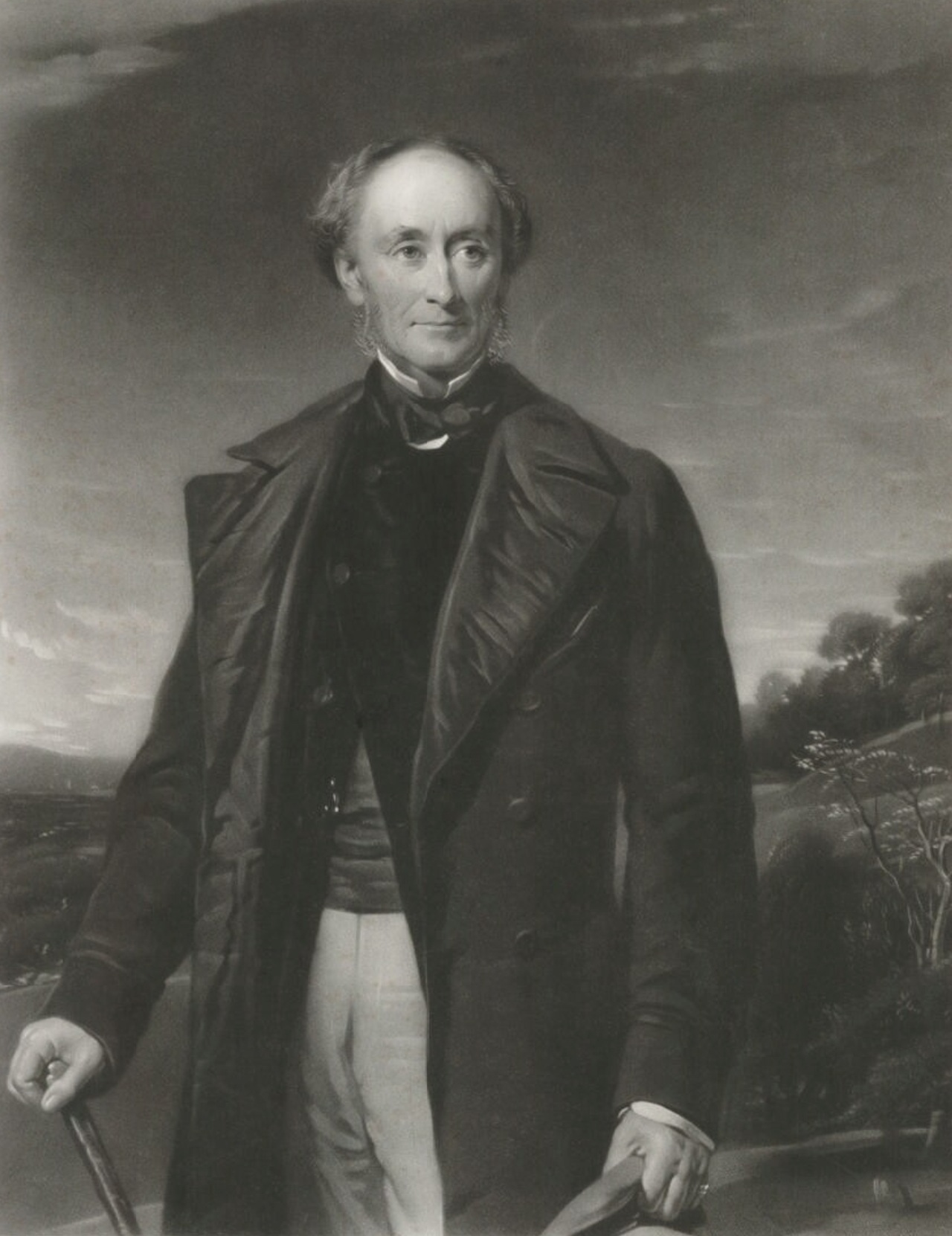
1862 engraving of Home

Cospatrick Alexander Douglas-Home, 11th Earl of Home (27 October 1799 – 4 July 1881), styled Lord Dunglass until 1841, was a British diplomat and politician. He served as a Scottish representative peer. During the premiership of the Duke of Wellington, he served as Under-Secretary of State for Foreign Affairs from 1828 to 1830.

== Background and education ==
Home was born at Dalkeith House, Midlothian (the seat of his maternal grandfather), the son of Alexander Home, 10th Earl of Home and Lady Elizabeth Scott, the daughter of Henry Scott, 3rd Duke of Buccleuch. He was educated at Christ Church, Oxford.

== Career ==
Home served as an Attaché at St Petersburg from 1822 to 1823 and was with the Foreign Office from 1823 to 1827. In 1828 he was appointed Under-Secretary of State for Foreign Affairs in the Duke of Wellington's Tory administration, a post he held until 1830. He succeeded his father in the earldom in 1841 and the following year he was elected a Scottish representative peer, which he remained until 1874. In 1875, he was created Baron Douglas, of Douglas in the County of Lanark, in the Peerage of the United Kingdom, a revival of the title that was held by his wife's maternal grandfather (see below) and entitled him and his descendants to an automatic seat in the House of Lords.

== Family ==
In 1832 Lord Home married Hon. Lucy Elizabeth Montagu-Scott, daughter of Henry Montagu-Scott, 2nd Baron Montagu of Boughton and Hon. Jane Margaret Douglas, the only daughter from the first marriage of Archibald Douglas, 1st Baron Douglas (a title which became extinct in 1857 upon the death of James Douglas, 4th Baron Douglas). He assumed the additional surname of Douglas on succeeding to the extensive Douglas and Angus estates. The couple had several children, including William Sholto Home (1842–1916), a Major-General in the British Army. The Countess of Home died in May 1877, aged 71. Lord Home died at the Hirsel, Berwickshire, in July 1881, aged 81, and was succeeded in the earldom by his eldest son, Charles. Home's great-grandson Alec Douglas-Home, 14th Earl of Home, was Prime Minister of the United Kingdom from 1963 to 1964.

== Labrador Retrievers ==
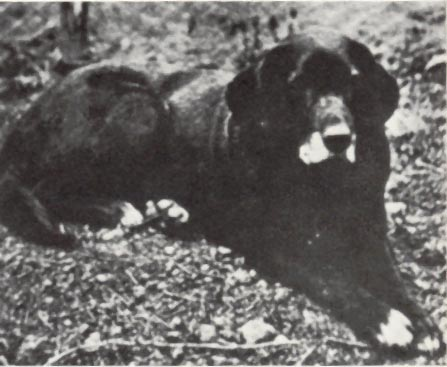
Nell (b. 1856). The first known photograph of a Labrador Retriever taken in 1867.

In the 1830s, Lord Home's father together with his cousins the 5th Duke of Buccleuch and Lord John Scott. were among the first to import Newfoundland dogs, or Labrador Retrievers as they later became known, for use as gundogs. The first known photograph of the breed, taken in 1856, was of Lord Home's dog "Nell".

Political offices
Preceded by The Lord Howard de Walden	Under-Secretary of State for Foreign Affairs; 1828–1830	Succeeded by Sir George Shee, Bt
Peerage of Scotland
Preceded by Alexander Home	Earl of Home; 1841–1881	Succeeded by Charles Douglas-Home
Peerage of the United Kingdom
New creation	Baron Douglas; 1875–1881	Succeeded by Charles Douglas-Home
