= James Douglas (British Army officer) =

British Army officer

General Sir James Douglas GCB
- Born: 14 January 1785
- Died: 6 March 1862 (aged 77)
- Military career
- Allegiance: United Kingdom
- Branch: British Army
- Rank: General
- Conflicts: Peninsular War
- Awards: Knight Commander of the Order of the Bath

General Sir James Dawes Douglas GCB (14 January 1785 – 6 March 1862) was a British Army officer, who had a long and illustrious military career, which included commanding Portuguese troops in the Peninsular War.

== Life ==
Douglas was the elder son of Major James Sholto Douglas, who was first cousin of the sixth and seventh Marquises of Queensberry, and Sarah, daughter of James Dawes. He entered the army as an ensign in the 42nd regiment, or Black Watch, and was at once taken on the staff of Major-general Sir James Duff, commanding at Limerick, where he became an intimate friend of his fellow aide-de-camp, William Napier.

In 1801, he was promoted lieutenant and joined the Royal Military College at Great Marlow. He was promoted captain in 1804, and, being pronounced fit for a staff situation, was appointed deputy-assistant quartermaster-general with the force sent to South America in 1806. His conduct was praised in despatches, and in 1807 he was nominated in the same capacity to the corps proceeding to Portugal under Sir Arthur Wellesley. He was present at the battle of Roliça and battle of Vimeiro. He advanced into Spain with Sir John Moore, and served with the 2nd division through the retreat from Salamanca and at the Battle of Corunna. When William Carr Beresford was sent to Portugal in 1809 to organise the Portuguese army, Douglas was one of the officers selected to accompany him, and he was in February 1809 promoted major in the English army and appointed lieutenant-colonel of the 8th Portuguese regiment. He got his regiment fit for service, and was present at the passage of the Douro River in May 1809, and at the close of the year his regiment was attached to Thomas Picton's, the 3rd division, and brigaded with the 88th and 45th regiments. At the battle of Busaco this brigade had to bear the brunt of the French attack, and Douglas's Portuguese received praise for its conduct, mentioned in Lord Wellington's despatch.

He commanded this regiment all through the campaign of 1811, and in 1812, when the Portuguese were brigaded alone, it formed part of Sir Denis Pack's Portuguese brigade. This was the brigade which distinguished itself at the battle of Salamanca by its attempt to carry the hill of the Arapiles, and Douglas's name was again mentioned in despatches. At the beginning of 1813 Major-general Pack was removed to the command of an English brigade, and Douglas, who had been promoted lieutenant-colonel in May 1811, succeeded him in the 7th Portuguese brigade, which formed part of Sir John Hamilton's Portuguese division. At the head of this brigade, he distinguished himself at the battles of the Pyrenees, where he was wounded, of the Nivelle, the Nive, Orthes, and Toulouse, where he was again twice severely wounded and lost a leg. At the conclusion of the war he received a gold cross and three clasps for the battles in which he had been engaged with a regiment or brigade, was made K.T.S. and K.C.B. on the extension of the order of the Bath.

He was deputy quartermaster-general in Scotland (1815–22) and in Ireland (1825–30). Douglas was promoted colonel in 1819 and major-general in 1830, when he received the command of the south-western district of Ireland. From 1837 to 1842 he was Lieutenant Governor of Guernsey. He was promoted lieutenant-general in 1838, and was made a G.C.B. in 1860. He had been made colonel of the 93rd foot in 1840 and of the 42nd Highlanders in 1850, and was promoted general in 1854. After leaving Guernsey he retired to Clifton, where he died on 6 March 1862, aged 77.

Government offices
Preceded by John Ross	Lieutenant Governor of Guernsey; 1837–1842	Succeeded by Sir William Napier
Military offices
Preceded by Sir John Macdonald	Colonel of the 42nd (Royal Highland) Regiment of Foot; 1850–1862	Succeeded by George Hay, 8th Marquess of Tweeddale
Preceded by Sir Jasper Nicolls	Colonel of the 93rd (Highland) Regiment of Foot; 1840–1850	Succeeded by William Wemyss
