= Francis Gordon (cricketer) =

English cricketer and British Army officer

Lieutenant colonel Francis Arthur Gordon (20 January 1808 – 26 June 1857) was a British Army officer and amateur cricketer. He was a member of the Huntly family, part of the Scottish aristocracy.

Gordon was the youngest son of George Gordon, 9th Marquess of Huntly and his wife Catherine (of the Cope baronets of Bruern). He was born at Orton Hall, the family seat at Orton Longueville in Huntingdonshire in 1808 and was educated at Thistledon School in Rutland before going up to Trinity College, Cambridge in 1828. He won a cricket Blue in 1829.

Gordon played regularly during the late 1820s, including in a total of seven matches, three for the University, three for MCC and once for the Gentlemen against the Players in 1827. He played alongside his brother, Charles Gordon, 10th Marquess of Huntly, against the Players; his brother had been MCC President in 1821 and both he and Gordon's father were members of the club. Gordon also played in a number of non-matches, including for MCC and others such as the Gentlemen of Kent.

Gordon joined the 1st Life Guards and rose to the rank of lieutenant colonel. Because of ill health was obliged to relinquish his command in 1855. He married Isabel Grant, daughter of General William Keir Grant, and died in France at Paris in 1857 aged 49.
