= Archibald Douglas, 1st Baron Douglas =

Scottish politician (1748–1827)

The Right Honourable The Lord Douglas

Member of Parliament for Forfar
- In office 1782–1790
- Preceded by: The Earl Panmure
- Succeeded by: David Scott

Personal details
- Born: Archibald James Edward Stewart; 10 July 1748; Paris, France
- Died: 26 December 1827 (aged 79); Bothwell Castle
- Spouses: Lady Lucy Graham (m. 1771; died 1780) Lady Frances Scott (after 1783)
- Relations: Archibald Douglas, 1st Duke of Douglas (uncle)
- Children: 9
- Parent(s): Sir John Stewart, Bt; Lady Jane Douglas

Archibald James Edward Douglas, 1st Baron Douglas (10 July 1748 – 26 December 1827), was a Scottish politician.

== Early life ==
He was born Archibald James Edward Stewart, in Paris, the twin son of Sir John Stewart, 3rd Baronet (1687–1764) and Lady Jane Douglas, daughter of James Douglas, 2nd Marquess of Douglas. The circumstances of the birth were controversial. His mother was the sister of the wealthy Duke of Douglas. As the Duke was childless, his estate would pass to the next in line, the Duke of Hamilton, unless an heir could be found. Lady Jane was 47 when she married the 60-year-old Colonel John Stewart, a man described by her brother, the Duke of Douglas, as a 'wore-out old rake'. In the summer of 1748, by which time she was 50, Lady Jane gave birth to twin boys - Archibald and Sholto - at the house of Madame Le Brun in Faubourg Saint-Germain, Paris.

=== The Douglas Cause ===
There followed a series of court cases, which became known as the Douglas Cause or Douglas Case. In 1767 Archibald lost a much publicised court case concerning the rights to the Douglas estates. His opponents, the 12-year-old Duke of Hamilton, Hew Dalrymple, and others, claimed that Stewart was not the son of Lady Jane Douglas, and thus was not the rightful heir to the Douglas estates. In February 1769 the House of Lords reversed the decision. Central to the case was whether Lady Jane was still able to have children and at the trials, intimate evidence of her menstrual status was presented by servants. However, witnesses were produced by the Hamiltons who claimed to have noticed nothing about Lady Jane's appearance to indicate that she was pregnant. Hamilton lawyers also found two French couples who both said they had sold babies to a mysterious foreign couple about the time the 'twins' were born. Douglas lawyers countered by providing evidence of a male midwife said to have delivered Lady Jane's babies. Archibald Douglas was able to inherit and his descendants, who included British Minister Alec Douglas-Home and has family, have benefited ever since.

== Career ==
Douglas was MP for Forfarshire from 1782 to 1790 and Lord Lieutenant of Forfarshire from 1794 to 1827. In parliament he was a loyal follower of Henry Dundas and William Pitt, and hoped to be rewarded with a peerage. Although he would have preferred an earldom, he was created Baron Douglas, of Douglas in the County of Lanark, in 1790.

Lord Douglas was an improving landlord who continued the rebuilding of Douglas Castle begun by his uncle. However the 1772 collapse of the Ayr bank of Douglas, Heron & Company was a blow to his financial position. In 1795, he raised the Angusshire Regiment of Fencible Infantry, who served in Ireland and Dumfries, as well as being involved with founding the Angus Volunteers Company of Fencible Men earlier in the same year. It was the latter Company that were on duty at the funeral of Robert Burns in 1796 according to officials in the Douglas History Archive although some references have inaccurately attributed this to the former group. As Lord-Lieutenant of Forfarshire, he was appointed Colonel of the Forfarshire Militia when that was raised in 1798, with the Brevet rank of Colonel in the army while that regiment was embodied. His son the Hon Archibald Douglas took over the command in 1802.

== Personal life ==
Lord Douglas married twice and had nine children, five sons and four daughters, most of whom reached old age. His first marriage was in 1771 to Lady Lucy Graham (1751–1780), a daughter of the 2nd Duke of Montrose. Before her death in 1780, they were the parents of:

- Archibald Douglas, 2nd Baron Douglas (1773–1844), who was educated at Eton and died unmarried.
- Charles Douglas, 3rd Baron Douglas (1775–1848), a barrister who died unmarried.
- Jane Margaret Douglas (1779–1859), who married Henry Montagu-Scott, 2nd Baron Montagu.

In 1783, he married secondly to Lady Frances Scott (1750–1817), sister of the 3rd Duke of Buccleuch. Together, they were the parents of:

- Frances Elizabeth Douglas (d. 1854), who married William Moray-Stirling, 17th of Abercairny, son of Charles Stirling-Moray, 15th of Abercairny.
- Mary Sidney Douglas, who married Robert Douglas in 1821.
- Caroline Lucy Douglas (1784–1857), who married Admiral Sir George Scott, son of John Scott, 6th of Gala, in 1810.
- Sholto Scott Douglas (1785–1821)
- James Douglas, 4th Baron Douglas (1787–1857), the Rector of Broughton who married Wilhelmina Murray, daughter of the Governor of Canada Gen. James Murray (son of Alexander Murray, 4th Lord Elibank), in 1813.
- George Douglas (1788–1838), who died unmarried.

Douglas died on 26 December 1827 at Bothwell Castle, Lanarkshire. He was buried in Douglas parish church in the same county. He was succeeded by three of his sons in turn: Archibald, Charles, and the Rev. James Douglas on whose death, the Barony of Douglas of Douglas became extinct. His daughter, Jane Margaret Douglas became his eventual heir. She married Henry, 2nd Baron Montagu of Boughton and had a daughter, Lucy Elizabeth Scott-Montagu-Douglas (later Countess of Home) to whom the Douglas estates descended.

Parliament of Great Britain
Preceded by The Earl Panmure	Member of Parliament for Forfar; 1782–1790	Succeeded by David Scott
Honorary titles
New office	Lord-Lieutenant of Forfarshire; 1794–1827	Succeeded by The Earl of Airlie
Peerage of Great Britain
New creation	Baron Douglas; 1790–1827	Succeeded by Archibald Douglas
