= Lord Douglas Gordon-Hallyburton =

Scottish soldier and Member of Parliament

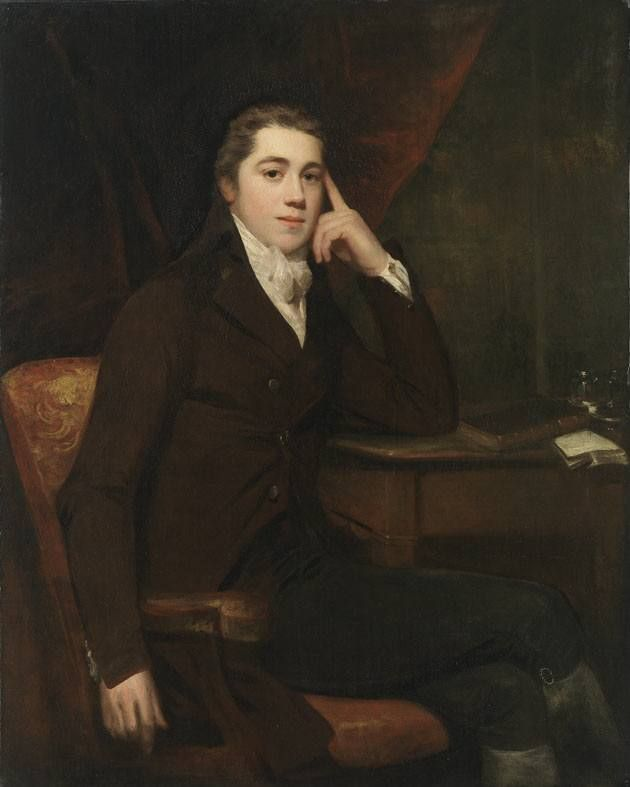
Lord Douglas Hallyburton by William Beechey, c.1797

Lord Douglas Gordon-Hallyburton (10 October 1777 – 25 December 1841) was a Scottish soldier and Member of Parliament.

== Biography ==
He was born as the Honourable Douglas Gordon, only child of Charles Gordon, 4th Earl of Aboyne by his second wife Mary, daughter of James Douglas, 14th Earl of Morton and Agatha, heiress of James Halyburton of Pitcur. In 1784, following the death of his first cousin Hamilton Douglas Halyburton, he succeeded to the estate of Pitcur, near Kettins in Forfarshire, and adopted the name and arms of Hallyburton of Pitcur.

On 28 March 1795 he joined the Army as an ensign in the 2nd Battalion Royal Regiment of Foot, quickly rising to become a lieutenant in the 2nd Battalion 78th Foot on 25 August and a captain in the 113th Foot on 31 August the same year. He served in the French Revolutionary War with Archduke Charles and carried home despatches from Charles Craufurd on 4 July 1796. After a period on half-pay he joined the 22nd Regiment of Foot on 14 August 1798 before exchanging into the 1st Foot Guards as a lieutenant on 25 December. He retained the Army rank of captain until appointed assistant adjutant general with the rank of major on 11 June 1803.

On 16 July 1807, at Dublin, he married Louisa, daughter of Sir Edward Leslie, 1st Baronet of Tarbert, County Kerry; they had no children.

On 21 March 1828, Douglas Gordon-Hallyburton was appointed a Deputy Lieutenant for Forfarshire by the Lord Lieutenant, Lord Airlie. In 1831, the Member of Parliament for the county William Ramsay Maule was raised to the peerage, and in the ensuing by-election Lord Airlie's brother Donald Ogilvy was returned. However this was overturned on petition and Hallyburton's name substituted on 31 January 1832. He was re-elected at the general election of that year and again in 1835.

In 1836 his half-brother George succeeded the last Duke of Gordon as Marquess of Huntly, and on 29 June that year Douglas was granted the rank and title of the younger son of a Marquess, becoming Lord Douglas Gordon-Hallyburton. He was elected again for Forfarshire in 1837 and sat until the general election of 1841. He died later that year, and his estates were inherited by his nephew Lord Frederick Gordon, who had also succeeded to the seat in Parliament. He was survived by his wife, who died on 2 October 1851.

Parliament of the United Kingdom
Preceded by Donald Ogilvy	Member of Parliament for Forfar; January 1832 – 1841	Succeeded by Lord Frederick Gordon-Hallyburton
