= George Gordon, 9th Marquess of Huntly =

Scottish peer (1761–1853)

The Most Honourable The Marquess of Huntly KT
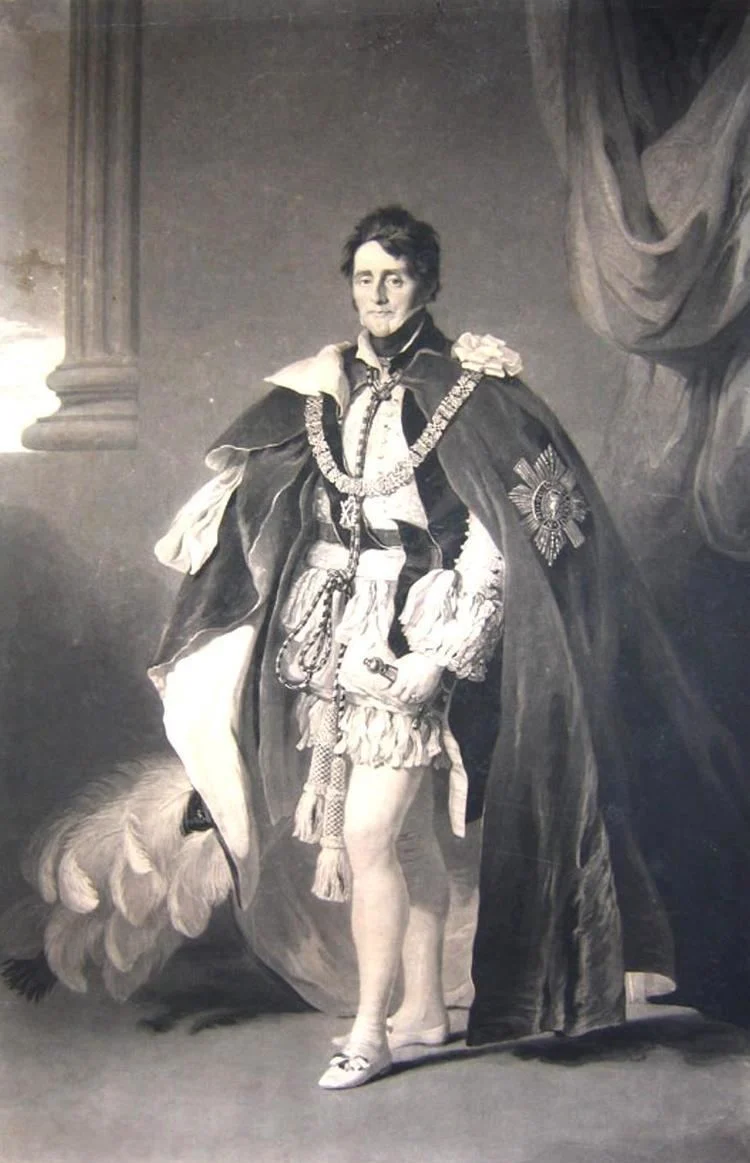

Grand Master of the Grand Lodge of Scotland
- In office 1802–1804
- Preceded by: Earl of Dalkeith
- Succeeded by: The Earl of Dalhousie

Personal details
- Born: George Gordon; 28 June 1761
- Died: 17 June 1853 (aged 91)
- Spouse: Catherine Cope (m. 1791; died 1832)
- Children: 9, including Charles, John Frederick, and Francis
- Parent(s): Charles Gordon, 4th Earl of Aboyne; Lady Margaret Stewart
- Other name: 5th Earl of Aboyne

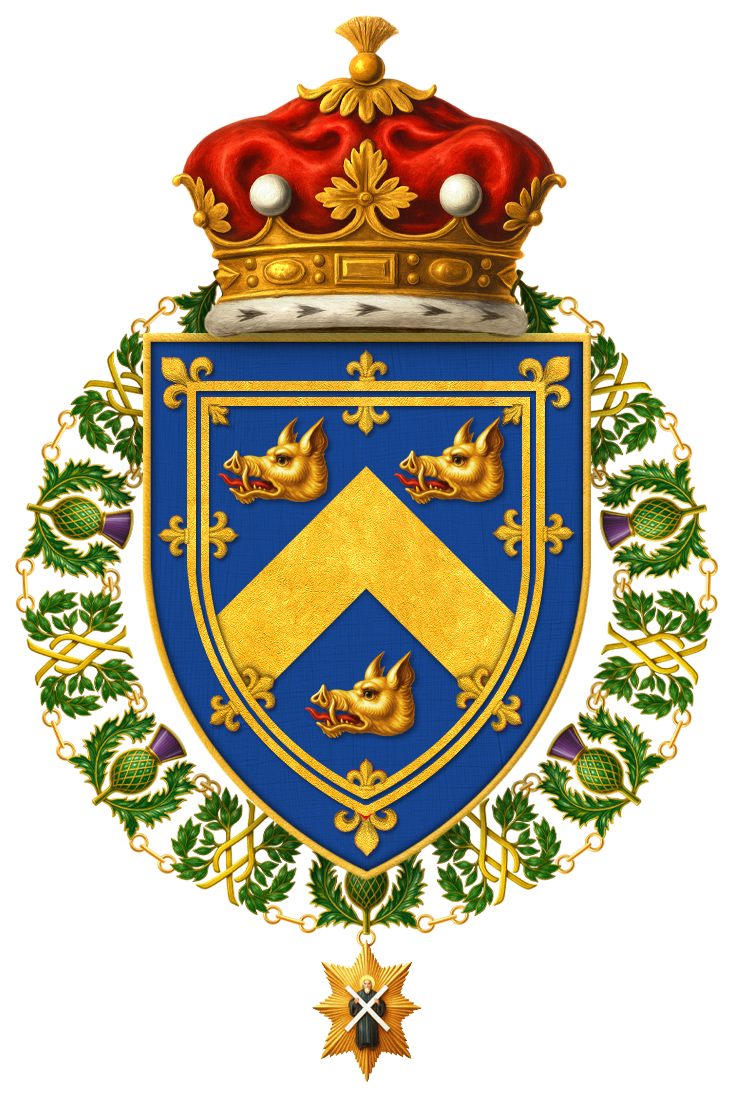
Shield of Arms of George Gordon, 9th Marquess of Huntly, KT

George Gordon, 9th Marquess of Huntly, KT (28 June 1761 – 17 June 1853), styled Lord Strathavon until 1795 and Earl of Aboyne from 1795 to 1836, was a Scottish peer and soldier.

== Early life ==
George was the son of Charles Gordon, 4th Earl of Aboyne, and Lady Margaret Stewart, daughter of Alexander Stewart, 6th Earl of Galloway. He was educated at Eton. His only surviving sister, Lady Margaret Gordon, married William Beckford. After his mother's death in August 1762, his father remarried to Lady Mary Douglas (a daughter of James Douglas, 14th Earl of Morton). From this marriage, he had a younger half-brother, Lord Douglas Gordon (who married Louisa Leslie).

His paternal grandparents were John Gordon, 3rd Earl of Aboyne (eldest son of Charles Gordon, 2nd Earl of Aboyne and, his cousin, Lady Elizabeth Lyon, second daughter of Patrick Lyon, 3rd Earl of Strathmore and Kinghorne) and the former Grace Lockhart (a daughter of George Lockhart of Carnwath). Through the male line, his great-great-grandfather, Charles Gordon, 1st Earl of Aboyne was the fourth son of George Gordon, 2nd Marquess of Huntly. His mother was the third daughter of Alexander Stewart, 6th Earl of Galloway and, his second wife, Lady Catherine Cochrane (the third and youngest daughter of John Cochrane, 4th Earl of Dundonald). Among his mother's siblings were John Stewart, 7th Earl of Galloway (who married Lady Charlotte Mary Greville, and Anne Dashwood); Hon. George Stewart (a Lieutenant who died at Fort Ticonderoga during the French and Indian War); Hon. Keith Stewart of Glasserton (who married Georgina Isabella d'Aguilar); Lady Catherine Stewart (wife of James Murray of Broughton); Lady Susanna Stewart (the wife of Granville Leveson-Gower, 1st Marquess of Stafford); Lady Harriet Stewart (the wife of Archibald Hamilton, 9th Duke of Hamilton); and Lady Charlotte Stewart (the wife of John Murray, 4th Earl of Dunmore).

== Career ==
Gordon was enlisted as ensign in the 1st Regiment of Foot (Royal Scots) in 1777. He was commissioned as a Captain the same year. In 1789, he was promoted Lieutenant Colonel.

Upon the death of his father in 1794, he succeeded to the title of Earl of Aboyne in the Peerage of Scotland. He was a Scottish representative peer between 1807 and 1819. On 11 August 1815, he was created Baron Meldrum, of Morven in the County of Aberdeen in the Peerage of the United Kingdom. After the death of his distant cousin, the 5th Duke of Gordon in 1836, he claimed the title of Marquess of Huntly (also in the Peerage of Scotland), which was acknowledged in 1838 (but not the Earldom of Enzie or the Lordship of Gordon of Badenoch).

From 1796 to 1806, he was Colonel in Chief to the 92nd Highlanders (Gordon Highlanders) and, from 1806 to 1820, was Colonel in Chief to the 42nd Highlanders (Black Watch). Huntly was also Colonel of the Aberdeen Mititia and served as aide-de-camp to King William IV from 1830 to 1837 and to Queen Victoria from 1837 to 1853. He was appointed a Knight of the Order of the Thistle in 1827.

== Cricket ==
Huntly played in three important matches between 1787 and 1792 whilst he was styled Lord Strathavon. He was a member of the White Conduit Club and an early member of the Marylebone Cricket Club (MCC), and played for Surrey.

== Personal life ==
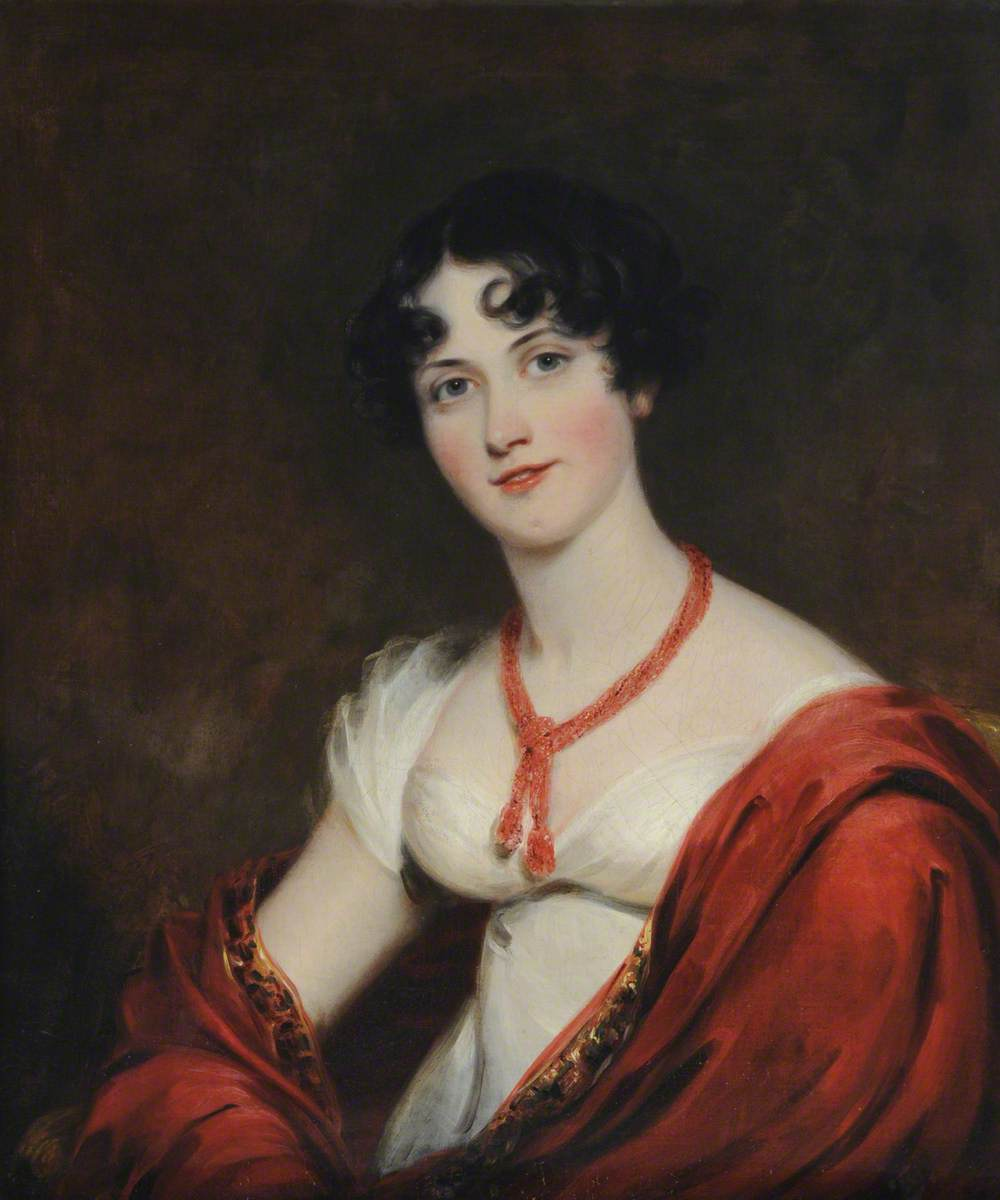
Portrait of Lady Catherine Gordon

On 4 April 1791, he married Catherine Cope (d. 16 November 1832), second daughter and co-heiress of Sir Charles Cope, 2nd Baronet of Bruern and the former Catherine Bishopp (a daughter of Sir Cecil Bishopp, 6th Baronet). After her father's death, her mother remarried to Charles Jenkinson, 1st Earl of Liverpool. Together, they had nine children:

- Charles Gordon, 10th Marquess of Huntly (1792–1863), who married Lady Elizabeth Henrietta Conyngham, the eldest daughter of Henry Conyngham, 1st Marquess Conyngham, in 1826. After her death in August 1839, he married Maria Antoinetta Pegus, the only surviving daughter of Rev. William Peter Pegus and the former Charlotte Susanna Layard (a daughter of Very Rev. Charles Layard, Dean of Bristol), in 1844.
- Lady Catherine Susan Gordon (1792–1866), who married Charles Cavendish, 1st Baron Chesham.
- Lord George Gordon (1794–1862), the Rector of Chesterton who married Charlotte Anne Vaughan, a daughter of Col. Thomas Wright Vaughan, in 1851.
- Lady Charlotte Sophia Gordon (1796–1876), who did not marry.
- Lady Mary Gordon (1797–1825), who married, as his first wife, Frederick Charles William Seymour, Esq., a son of Lord Hugh Seymour, in 1822.
- Lord John Frederick Gordon-Hallyburton (1799–1878), an Admiral of the British Navy who married Lady Augusta (née FitzClarence) Kennedy-Erskine, the widow of Hon. John Kennedy-Erskine (second son of Archibald Kennedy, 1st Marquess of Ailsa), sister of George FitzClarence, 1st Earl of Munster, and fourth daughter of King William IV and his mistress Dorothea Jordan, in 1836.
- Lord Henry Gordon (1802–1865), a Major in the East India Company Militia in Bengal; he married Louisa Payne in 1827.
- Lord Cecil James Gordon-Moore (1806–1878), who married Emily Moore, a daughter of Maurice Crosbie Moore of Mooresfort, in 1841.
- Lord Francis Arthur Gordon (1808–1857), a Lt.-Col. who married Isabel Grant, a daughter of Lt.-Gen. Sir William Keir Grant, in 1835.

Lady Aboyne died on 16 November 1832. Lord Huntly died on 17 June 1853.

Masonic offices
Preceded by Earl of Dalkeith	Grand Master of the Grand Lodge of Scotland; 1802–1804	Succeeded by The Earl of Dalhousie
Peerage of Scotland
Preceded by George Gordon	Marquess of Huntly; 1836–1853	Succeeded by Charles Gordon
Preceded by Charles Gordon	Earl of Aboyne; 1795–1853	Succeeded by Charles Gordon
Peerage of the United Kingdom
New creation	Baron Meldrum; 1815–1853	Succeeded by Charles Gordon
