= James Douglass =

James Douglass may refer to:

- James Nicholas Douglass (1826–1898), British civil engineer and lighthouse designer
- James W. Douglass (born 1937), American author, theologian, and activist
- Jimmy Douglass, American record producer

== See also ==
- James Douglas (disambiguation)
