= Caroline Lucy Scott =

English novelist and religious writer

Caroline Lucy Scott, Lady Scott (16 February 1784 – 20 April 1857), was an English novelist and religious writer. She was also a landscape painter.

== Biography ==
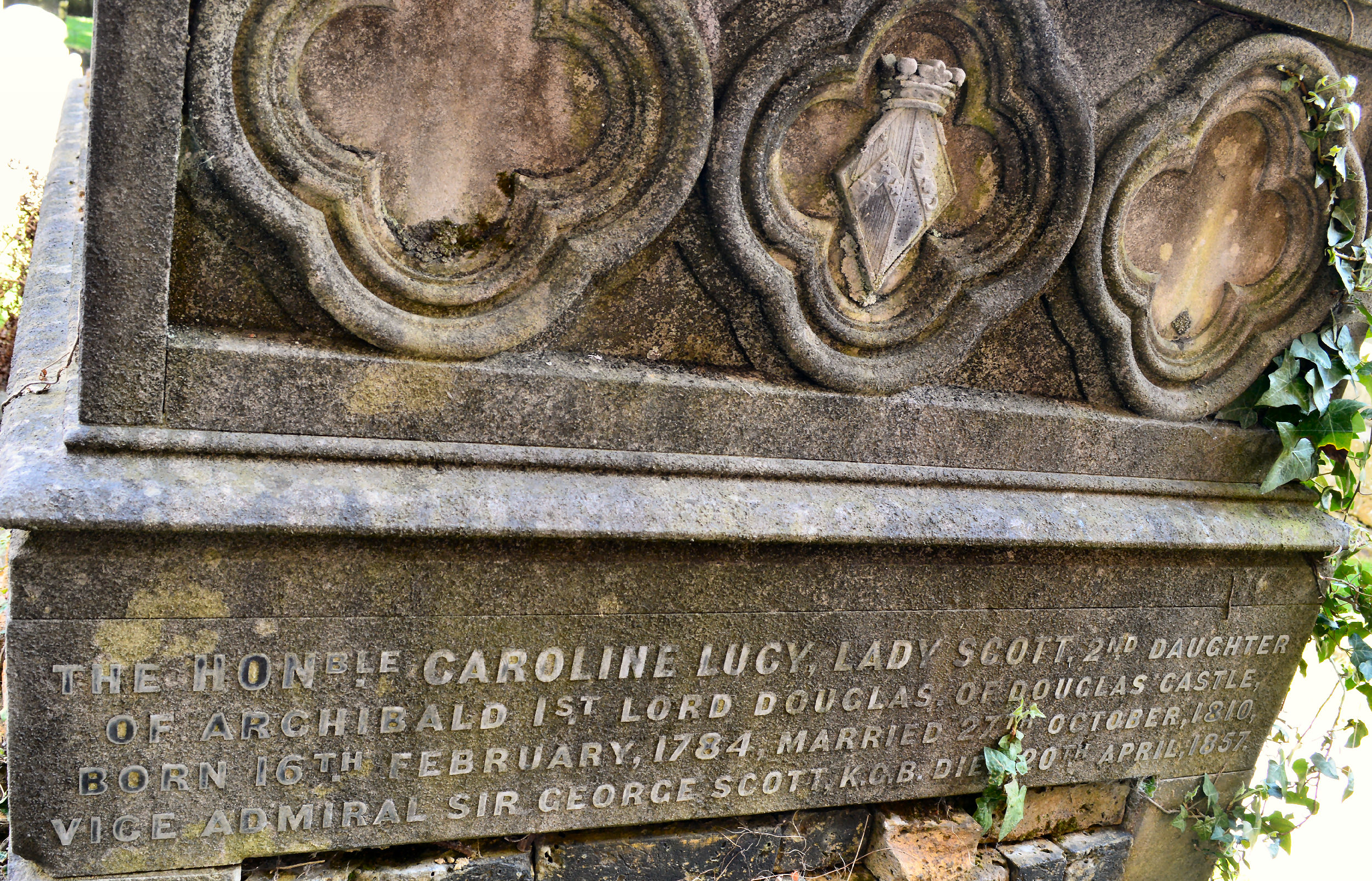
Gravestone in St Peter's Church, Petersham

Caroline was born on 16 February 1784 as the second daughter of Archibald, first Baron Douglas (1748–1827) and Frances, sister of Henry, third duke of Buccleuch. She married, on 27 October 1810, Admiral Sir George Scott, K. C. B., who died on 21 December 1841. Lady Scott died at Petersham, Surrey, on 20 April 1857. She must be distinguished from another novelist contemporary with her: Harriet Anne Scott, also Lady Scott.

== Writings ==
Scott's first novel, A Marriage in High Life (1828, 2 vols), was edited by the author of Flirtation: her relative, Lady Charlotte Susan Maria Bury. The plot was based on fact. The style is diffuse, but the interest well sustained. A French translation appeared in 1830. Another English edition appeared in 1857. Two other novels followed, likewise anonymously: Trevelyan, 1833, reprinted 1837 (Bentley's Standard Novels, No. 58) and 1860 (the Railway Library), and The Old Grey Church in 1856. Trevelyan appeared in a German translation in 1835.

Lady Scott's succeeding, non-fiction works name her as author. They are Exposition of the Types and Antitypes of the Old and New Testament, 1856, Incentives to Bible Study; Scripture Acrostics; a Sabbath Pastime for Young People, 1860, and Acrostics, Historical, Geographical, and Biographical, 1863.

Lady Scott was also a landscape painter.

== Attributions ==
- ODNB, 2004
- This article incorporates text from a publication now in the public domain: Boase, George Clement (1885–1900). "Scott, Caroline Lucy". Dictionary of National Biography. London: Smith, Elder & Co. citing:
  - Works in Brit. Mus. Libr.;
  - Lodge's Peerage. 1856. p. 189.;
  - Dod's Peerage. 1855. p. 482.
