= Baron Douglas of Douglas =

Barony in the Peerage of Great Britain

The title of Baron Douglas, of Douglas in the county of Lanark, has been created twice, once in the Peerage of Great Britain and once in the Peerage of the United Kingdom.

The first creation was on 8 July 1790 for Archibald James Edward Douglas, MP for Forfarshire. He was born Archibald Stewart, son of Sir John Stewart, 3rd Baronet of Grantully by his second wife Lady Jane Douglas, sister of Archibald Douglas, 1st Duke of Douglas. He had changed his name to Douglas in 1761 as heir to his uncle, but was disinherited by the Court of Session in 1767 and only confirmed in the estates by the House of Lords in 1769. This was known as the Douglas Cause. By his first wife Lady Lucy, daughter of William Graham, 2nd Duke of Montrose, he was father of the second and third Barons, the younger of whom served as MP for Lanarkshire. By his second wife Lady Frances, daughter of Francis Scott, Earl of Dalkeith, he was father of the fourth Baron. None of his sons had issue, so the barony became extinct on the death of the fourth Baron, 6 April 1857.

The second creation was on 11 June 1875 for Cospatrick Alexander Home, 11th Earl of Home. He had been previously elected a Scottish representative peer and this barony gave him a permanent seat in the House of Lords. He had married in 1832 Lucy Montagu-Scott, daughter of Henry James Montagu-Scott, 2nd Baron Montagu of Boughton by his wife Jane Margaret Douglas, daughter of the first Baron Douglas by his first wife Lucy Graham. Their son adopted the surname of Douglas-Home in 1877, and succeeded as Baron Douglas and Earl of Home in 1888. The title is currently held by Michael David Alexander Douglas-Home, 16th Earl of Home and 6th Baron Douglas.

== Barons Douglas (1790) ==
- Archibald James Edward Douglas, 1st Baron Douglas (1748–1827)
- Archibald Douglas, 2nd Baron Douglas (1773–1844)
- Charles Douglas, 3rd Baron Douglas (1775–1848)
- James Douglas, 4th Baron Douglas (1787–1857)

== Barons Douglas (1875) ==
- Cospatrick Alexander Home, 11th Earl of Home (1799–1881)
- Charles Alexander Douglas-Home, 12th Earl of Home (1834–1918)
- see Earl of Home for subsequent holders

== See also ==
- Douglas Castle
