= Alexander Home, 10th Earl of Home =

British peer

The Right Honourable The Earl of Home
- 10th Earl of Home
- Born: Alexander Home; 11 November 1769; Coldstream, Berwickshire, Scotland
- Died: 21 October 1841 (aged 71); Coldstream, Berwickshire, Scotland
- Spouse: Lady Elizabeth Scott (m. 1798)
- Issue: Cospatrick Home, 11th Earl of Home; The Hon. William Ramey-Home; The Hon. Henry Home
- Parents: Alexander Home, 9th Earl of Home; Abigail Brown Ramey

Alexander Ramey-Home, 10th Earl of Home (11 November 1769 – 21 October 1841), styled Lord Dunglass from 1781 to 1786, was a British politician and nobleman. He served as a Scottish representative peer between 1807 and 1841.

== Background ==
He was the son of the Rev. Alexander Home, 9th Earl of Home, and his third wife, Abigail Brown Ramey. He succeeded to his father's titles and estates on 8 October 1786. He was given the name of Alexander Home at birth, but on 1 March 1814, his name was legally changed to Alexander Ramey-Home by Royal Licence.

== Career ==
He held office as the first Lord Lieutenant of Berwickshire between 1794 and 1841. In 1798 he was appointed Lieutenant-Colonel of the 10th (or Edinburgh) Regiment of North British Militia under the command of his father-in-law, Henry Scott, 3rd Duke of Buccleuch. In 1802 the regiment was split, and Home became Colonel of the Berwickshire, Haddington, Linlithgow and Peebles Militia.

== Marriage and issue ==
On 6 November 1798, he married Lady Elizabeth Scott, daughter of the 3rd Duke of Buccleuch, and Lady Elizabeth Montagu (daughter of George Montagu, 1st Duke of Montagu).

The couple had three sons:

- Cospatrick Alexander Home, 11th Earl of Home (born 27 October 1799, died 4 July 1881)
- The Hon. William Montagu Ramey-Home (born 22 November 1800, died 22 July 1822)
- The Hon. Henry Campbell Home (born 1801, died an infant)

== Labrador Retrievers ==
In the 1830s, Lord Home (along with his nephews the 5th Duke of Buccleuch and Lord John Scott) was among the first to import Newfoundland dogs, or Labrador Retrievers as they later became known, for use as gundogs. His dogs are considered to be the progenitors of modern Labradors.

Honorary titles
New office	Lord Lieutenant of Berwickshire; 1794 – 1841	Succeeded by The Earl of Lauderdale
Peerage of Scotland
Preceded by Alexander Home	Earl of Home; 1786–1841	Succeeded by Cospatrick Douglas-Home
