= Charles Gordon, 4th Earl of Aboyne =

Scottish peer (1726-1794)

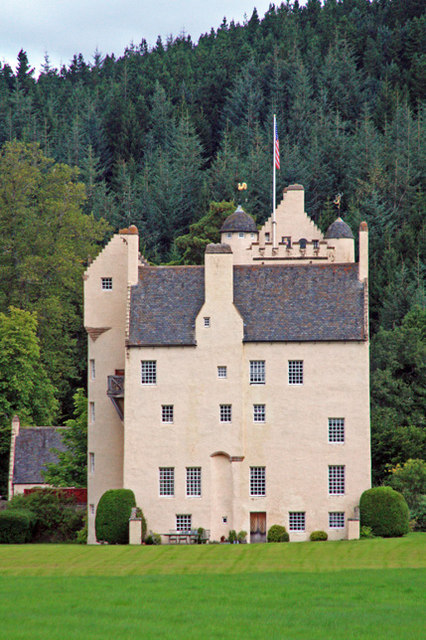
Aboyne Castle

Charles Gordon, 4th Earl of Aboyne (c. 1726 – 28 December 1794). The eldest son of John Gordon, 3rd Earl of Aboyne and Grace Lockhart, he succeeded his father as 4th Earl of Aboyne on 7 April 1732. On his death in 1794 he was succeeded in his titles by his eldest son.

His family home was Aboyne Castle, but he had an Edinburgh townhouse in the newly built St Andrews Square in the New Town.

== Family ==
He married firstly, Lady Margaret Stewart, daughter of Alexander Stewart, 6th Earl of Galloway and Lady Catherine Cochrane, on 22 April 1759, and had issue:

- Lady Catherine Gordon (1760–1764), died in infancy, buried in Restalrig churchyard
- George Gordon, 9th Marquess of Huntly (1761–1853)
- Lady Margaret Gordon (c. 1763–86), married William Beckford (1783)

His first wife died on 12 August 1762.

He married secondly, Lady Mary Douglas, daughter of James Douglas, 14th Earl of Morton and Agatha Halyburton, on 13 April 1774, and had issue:

- Lord Douglas Gordon (1777–1841)

== Notes ==
Peerage of Scotland
Preceded by John Gordon	Earl of Aboyne; 1732–1794	Succeeded by George Gordon
