= Charles Douglas, 3rd Baron Douglas =

English cricketer

Charles Douglas, 3rd Baron Douglas of Douglas (26 October 1775 – 10 September 1848), known as the Honourable Charles Douglas from 1790 to 1844, was a Scottish amateur cricketer who made 13 known appearances in important matches from 1797 to 1799.

On 25 May 1805 he was commissioned as a Major in the Forfar and Kincardine Militia, commanded by his elder brother. By 1815, when the regiment was serving in Ireland, he was the Lieutenant-Colonel.

He was Member of Parliament (MP) for Lanarkshire from 1830 to 1832.

He succeeded as 3rd Baron Douglas of Douglas in January 1844 and died unmarried. The titles passed to his younger brother, the Reverend James Douglas.

He was a member of Marylebone Cricket Club (MCC).

Parliament of the United Kingdom
Preceded by Sir Michael Shaw-Stewart, Bt	Member of Parliament for Lanarkshire; 1830–1832	Succeeded by Sir John Maxwell of Pollok
Peerage of Great Britain
Preceded by Archibald Douglas	Baron Douglas of Douglas; 1844–1848	Succeeded by James Douglas

== Bibliography ==
- Haygarth, Arthur (1996) [1862]. Scores & Biographies, Volume 1 (1744–1826). Kennington: Frederick Lillywhite. ISBN 978-19-00592-23-9.
- Haygarth, Arthur (1997) [1862]. Scores & Biographies, Volume 2 (1827–1840). Kennington: Frederick Lillywhite. ISBN 978-19-00592-23-9.
