= Douglas Castle =

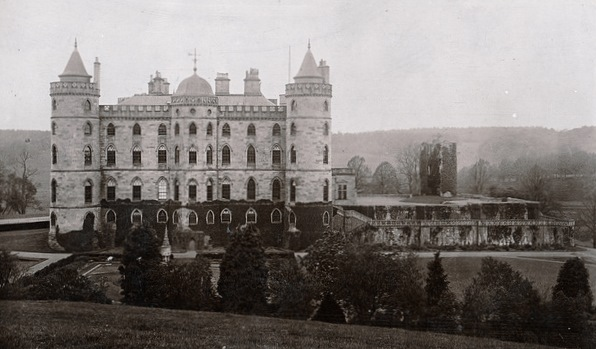
- Douglas Castle (demolished in 1938)

- Location within South Lanarkshire
- 55.56610°N 3.83624°W

Listed Building – Category C(S)
- Designated: 12 January 1971
- Reference no.: LB1449

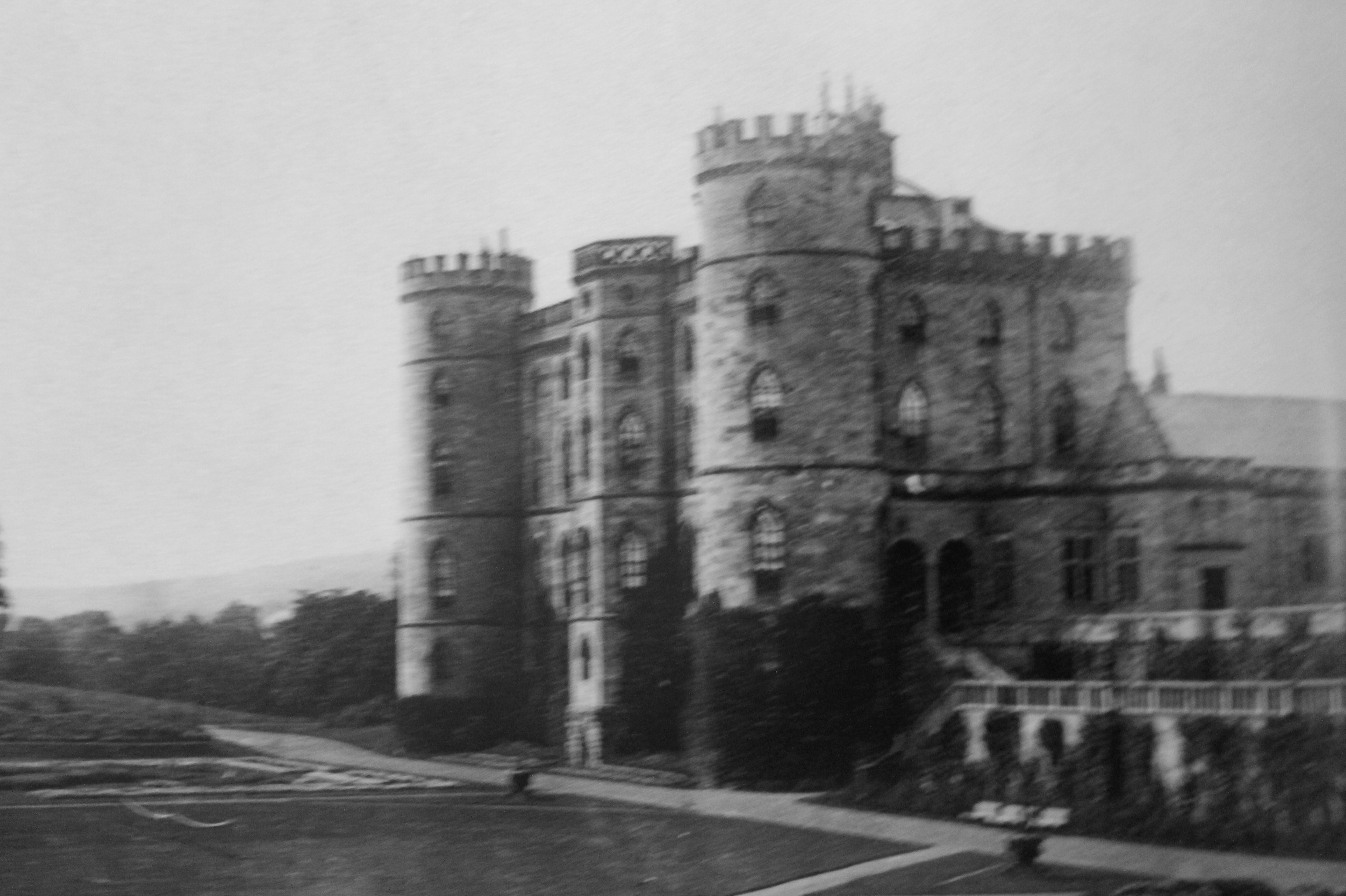
Douglas Castle in 1883

Douglas Castle was a stronghold of the Douglas (later Douglas-Home) family from medieval times to the 20th century. The first castle, erected in the 13th century, was destroyed and replaced several times until the 18th century when a large mansion house was built in its place. This too was demolished in 1938, and today only a single corner tower of the 17th-century castle remains. The castle was the former family seat of the Prime Minister, Sir Alec Douglas-Home. The castle was located around 1 kilometre (0.62 mi) north-east of the village of Douglas, South Lanarkshire, in south-west Scotland. The remains are protected as a category C listed building.

== History ==
The Douglas family built the first Douglas Castle, which was constructed of either wood or stone, sometime before 1288. In 1307, during the Wars of Scottish Independence the castle was captured and garrisoned by the English under Lord Clifford. Sir James Douglas, companion of Robert the Bruce successfully recaptured his family seat by storming the castle on Palm Sunday, while the garrison were at chapel. He had the garrison killed and thrown into a cellar, before the structure was burned. The event has become known as "Douglas' larder".

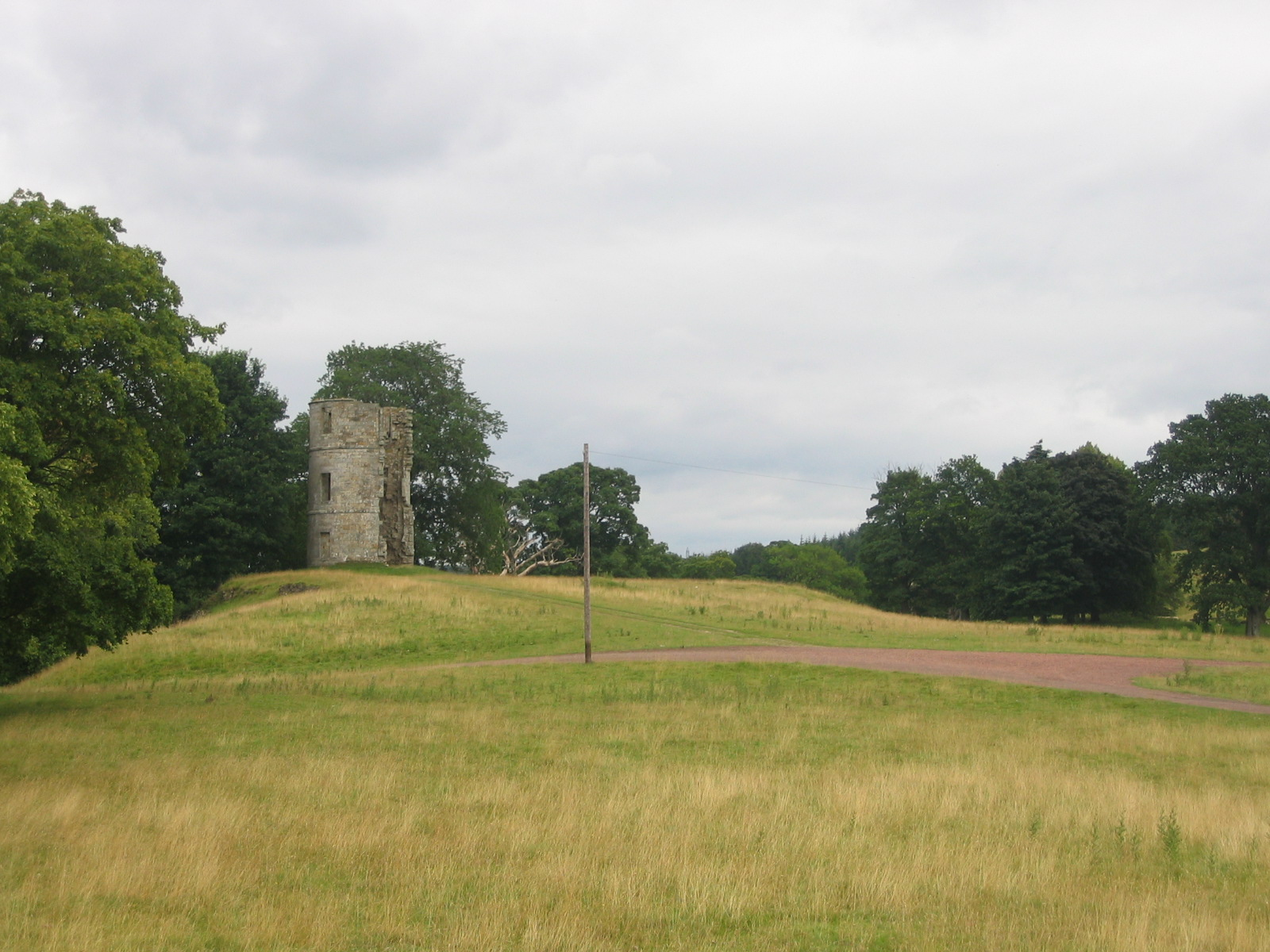
The remains of the 17th-century castle, seen from the south-west

Robert the Bruce rewarded Sir James's loyalty with vast holdings, and in 1357 Sir James' nephew, Sir William Douglas, was created the 1st Earls of Douglas/Earl of Douglas. In 1384, Sir James's illegitimate son, Sir Archibald Douglas, 3rd Earl of Douglas/Archibald Douglas, became the 3rd Earl of Douglas, and Douglas Castle was rebuilt as one of the Douglas strongholds. In the 15th century, the power of the "Black" Douglases had come to threaten the Stewart monarchy. In 1455 James II led an expedition against the rebellious 9th Earl, defeating his forces at the battle of Arkinholm. Douglas Castle was sacked then and the family's lands and titles forfeited.

The "Red" Douglases, Earls of Angus, had sided with the king against the senior branch of their family, and it was they who gained the Douglas lands in Lanarkshire. It is likely that the castle was rebuilt soon after 1455. Regent Morton came to Douglasdale in June 1574 to survey the house of the Earl of Angus with a view to repairing it and living there.

In 1703, Archibald Douglas, 3rd Marquess of Douglas was created Duke of Douglas, with his principal seat at Douglas Castle. The castle was again rebuilt around this time, as a tower house and an enclosed courtyard with a corner tower. This castle was destroyed by fire in 1755, with the exception of the corner tower.

From 1757, the Duke began construction of an enormous castellated mansion at Douglas. The architects of this, the final Douglas Castle, were the Adam Brothers (James Adam, John Adam, and Robert Adam). Had it been completed the castle would have been the largest in Scotland. As it was the Duke of Douglas died in 1761, and only around half of the original design was ever completed. The five-storey building had round towers to the front and square towers to the rear facade, and stood in a very extensive park spanning the valley of the Douglas Water. The Duke's estate became the subject of a famous and bitter legal dispute, known as the "Douglas Cause", between his nephew Archibald James Edward Douglas and the Duke of Hamilton. Douglas was eventually victorious and ennobled as Baron Douglas in 1790, and the castle descended through his daughter, and granddaughter, to the Earls of Home. In the 1930s Charles Douglas-Home, 13th Earl of Home allowed the mining of coal in the park adjacent to the castle, in an attempt to relieve desperate levels of local unemployment. The mining caused dangerous subsidence to the castle and it had to be demolished in 1938.

== The castle today ==
Today, only a ruined corner tower of the penultimate castle remains, built in the late 17th century. Three storeys and 9m in height, the tower once stood at the corner of an enclosure, estimated at 40m across. The tower stands on a prominent rise in the valley, to the south of the river, and was retained as a garden folly when the later mansion was built. Below is a small cellar block with glazed tiles on the interior walls. Nothing visible remains of the mansion.

Sir Walter Scott used the location and early history of Castle Douglas as the inspiration for his novel Castle Dangerous. The castle is still sometimes referred to by this alternative name.

A former lodge to the castle is preserved in the Cairn Lodge service area on the M74.
