= William Moray-Stirling, 17th of Abercairny =

William Moray-Stirling, 17th of Abercairny and Ardoch (1 June 1785 – 9 November 1850) was a Scottish landowner.

== Early life ==
Moray-Stirling was born on 1 June 1785 in Perthshire, Scotland. He was the son of Charles Moray, 15th of Abercairny and the former Anne Stirling. His elder brother was James Moray, 16th of Abercairny, who was a magistrate and Deputy Lieutenant of Perthshire and who married Elizabeth Erskine (daughter of Gen. Sir William Erskine, Bt) and, after her death, Mary Thomas. His younger brother, Charles Moray, died unmarried at Ardoch in 1820.

== Career ==
He was a major in the army, and was present at Battle of Waterloo in 1815.

He succeeded his mother in Ardoch in 1820, when he added the name Stirling, and succeeded his brother in Abercairny in 1840 (who died without issue), which he disentailed.

== Personal life ==
On 18 October 1826, William married the Hon. Frances Elizabeth "Fanny" Douglas (d. 1854), third daughter of Archibald Douglas, 1st Baron Douglas, but had no children.

Upon his death on 9 November 1850, he was succeeded in both of his estates by his sister, Christian, who was married to Henry Home-Drummond of Blair Drummond. His widow died on 14 September 1854.
