= Jamie Douglas (song) =

Folk song

"Jamie Douglas" (Roud 87, Child 204) is a traditional English-language folk song, existing in more than 80 different variants according to the Roud Folk Song Index (such as "The Water Is Wide/Waly Waly"). This ballad is believed to refer to the ostensibly unhappy first marriage of James Douglas, 2nd Marquess of Douglas to Lady Barbara Erskine.

== Synopsis ==
The hero—usually Earl Douglas—has married the first-person narrator, but she was slandered, and accused of adultery with another man. The heroine bitterly laments that his heart grew cold to her. Her father sends men to fetch her home, and she goes, urging her husband to be kind to their three children. Her father may promise to divorce them and marry her to a greater lord, and she always fiercely repudiates any such effort; she would not trade one kiss from her husband for any lord.
