= Archibald Douglas, 1st Duke of Douglas =

Scottish nobleman (1694–1761)

His Grace The Duke of Douglas

Personal details
- Born: Archibald Douglas; 15 October 1694
- Died: 21 July 1761 (aged 66)
- Spouse: Margaret Douglas (m. 1758)
- Parent(s): James Douglas, 2nd Marquess of Douglas; Lady Mary Kerr

Archibald Douglas, 1st Duke of Douglas (15 October 1694 – 21 July 1761) was a Scottish nobleman.

== Early life ==
He was the second son of James Douglas, 2nd Marquess of Douglas, by his second marriage to Lady Mary Kerr, daughter of Robert Kerr, 1st Marquess of Lothian and Lady Jean Campbell. His elder brother, William, died in infancy in 1694, and Archibald was thereafter styled Earl of Angus.

Douglas succeeded his father in 1700, and on 10 April 1703, was created Duke of Douglas, Marquess of Angus and Abernethy, Viscount of Jedburgh Forest, and Lord Douglas of Bonkill, Prestoun, and Robertoun. The bearer of the Crown of Scotland on state occasions, he conveyed it to Edinburgh Castle after the closing of the last Parliament of Scotland.

== Career ==
During the Jacobite rising of 1715, Douglas took the Hanoverian side, and led the volunteer horse at the Battle of Sheriffmuir. In maturity, Douglas grew eccentric, and perhaps insane, slew Captain John Kerr (the natural son of his uncle, Lord Mark Kerr) at Douglas Castle, while the latter was guesting with him there, and was forced to flee for some time to Holland. His residence of Douglas Castle was plundered by Highlanders during the Rising of 1745.

== Personal life ==
He fell out with his sister, Lady Jane Douglas, when he discovered her secret marriage to Sir John Stewart, 3rd Baronet of Grantully, and treated her with great cruelty. In 1755, Douglas Castle burned, and he hired Robert Adam to rebuild it, although the work was never finished, being halted by the Duke's death.

In 1758, Lord Douglas married Margaret Douglas, daughter of James Douglas of Mains, who succeeded in reconciling him with Archibald, his nephew by Lady Jane (who had died in 1754). Ultimately, the Duke was persuaded to entail his estates upon Archibald, a decision which led to the celebrated Douglas Cause upon his death, when the Duke of Hamilton (who inherited the Marquessate of Douglas) and his kin unsuccessfully contested Archibald's legitimacy.

== Ancestry ==
Ancestors of Archibald Douglas, 1st Duke of Douglas

16. William Douglas, 10th Earl of Angus
8. William Douglas, 1st Marquess of Douglas
17. Lady Elizabeth Oliphant
4. Archibald Douglas, 1st Earl of Ormond
18. Claud Hamilton, 1st Lord Paisley
9. The Hon. Margaret Hamilton
19. The Hon. Margaret Seton
2. James Douglas, 2nd Marquess of Douglas
20. Esmé Stuart, 1st Duke of Lennox
10. Esmé Stuart, 3rd Duke of Lennox
21. Catherine de Balzac
5. Lady Anne Stuart
22. Gervase Clifton, 1st Baron Clifton
11. Katherine Clifton, 2nd Baroness Clifton
23. Katherine Darcy
1. Archibald Douglas, 1st Duke of Douglas
24. Robert Kerr, 1st Earl of Ancram
12. William Kerr, 1st Earl of Lothian
25. Elizabeth Murray
6. Robert Kerr, 1st Marquess of Lothian
26. Robert Kerr, 2nd Earl of Lothian
13. Anne Kerr, 3rd Countess of Lothian
27. Lady Annabella Campbell
3. Lady Mary Kerr
28. Archibald Campbell, 7th Earl of Argyll
14. Archibald Campbell, 1st Marquess of Argyll
29. Lady Agnes Douglas
7. Lady Jean Campbell
30. William Douglas, 7th Earl of Morton
15. Lady Margaret Douglas
31. Lady Anne Keith

Peerage of Scotland
New creation	Duke of Douglas; 1703–1761	Extinct
Preceded by James Douglas	Marquess of Douglas; 1700–1761	Succeeded by James Douglas-Hamilton
