= James Douglas, 2nd Marquess of Douglas =

Scottish noble (1646–1700)

James Douglas, 2nd Marquess of Douglas (c.1646 – 25 February 1700) was the son of Archibald Douglas, Earl of Angus and 1st Earl of Ormond, and Lady Anne Stuart.

James, second Marquis of Douglas, born in 1646, succeeded his grandfather in 1660, and was a privy councillor to Kings Charles II and James VII. He died 25 February 1700, in the 54th year of his age. His eldest son, James, Earl of Angus, born in 1671, in 1689 raised for the service of the nation, in one day, a regiment of eighteen hundred men, now called the 26th foot or Cameronians, of which he was appointed colonel, 19 April of that year. After much active service he fell at the Battle of Steinkirk 3d August 1692, in the 21st year of his age, unmarried. His half brother, William, also bore the title of earl of Angus, but died an infant in 1694. Archibald, the third son of the second marquis, succeeded as third marquis.

His first marriage was in 1670 to the Lady Barbara Erskine, daughter of John Erskine, 21st Earl of Mar and Jean Mackenzie. He later married Mary Kerr, daughter of Robert Kerr, 1st Marquess of Lothian and Lady Jean Campbell.

The story of the end of the marriage between James Douglas and Barbara Erskine is immortalized in the popular ballad Waly Waly, which is known by many alternative titles (e.g. Jamie Douglas, When Cockleshells Turn Silver Bells, Water Is Wide) with many alternative lyrics and melodies. If the lyrics are to be believed, in 1681 a rumour apparently was put to Douglas by Lowrie of Blackwood that Erskine had been sleeping with another man, and Douglas promptly dropped her. Her father took her home and she never remarried.

The Marquis of Douglas, a young man, after being engaged for marriage

with the daughter of one Widow Jack, a taverner at Perth, was wedded at Aba House to Lady Barbara Erskine, daughter of the Earl of Mar.—Lam.

This was an unfortunate marriage for the lady. The marquis, a man of profligate conduct, was subsequently led by his factor, Lowrie of Blackwood (said to have been a rejected suitor of the lady), to suspect his marchioness of infidelity, and they were consequently separated, after she had born him one child. The sorrows of the Marchioness of Douglas were described in a popular ballad of the day, some verses of which constitute the favourite song of Waly, waly!

'O wherefore should I busk my head,
Or wherefore should I kaim my hair,
Since my true love has me forsook,
And says he‘ll never love me mair.
Now Arthur’s Seat shall be my bed,
The sheets shall ne’er be pressed by me,
St Anton’s Well shall be my drink,
Since my true love’s forsaken me.
O Martinmas wind, when wilt thou blaw,
And shake the green leaf aff the tree?
O gentle death, when wilt thou come,
And take a life that wearies me?’

The prose reality of all this was, that the marchioness by and by obtained a decree of the Privy Council, allowing her a provision out of her husband’s estate. The marquis, by a subsequent marriage, was the father of the semi-mad Duke of Douglas and of the celebrated Lady Jane Douglas.

Peerage of Scotland
Preceded by William Douglas	Marquess of Douglas; 1660–1700	Succeeded by Archibald Douglas
