= James Sholto Douglas =

Scottish diplomat

James Sholto Douglas (3 July 1757–1833) was a Scottish diplomat who was British Consul to Tangiers.

Douglas owned the Grove estate, Hanover Parish, Jamaica.

He was the son of Charles James Sholto Douglas and Basilia Dawes.
