= James Hamilton, 7th Duke of Hamilton =

British noble (1755–1769)

His Grace The Duke of Hamilton and Brandon
- Born: 18 February 1755; Holyrood Palace
- Died: 7 July 1769; Hamilton Palace
- Predecessor: James Hamilton (as Duke of Hamilton); Archibald Douglas (as Marquess of Douglas)
- Successor: Douglas Hamilton
- Parents: 6th Duke of Hamilton (father); Elizabeth (mother)

James George Hamilton, 7th Duke of Hamilton and 4th Duke of Brandon (18 February 1755 – 7 July 1769) was a short-lived Scottish peer.

Hamilton was born at Holyrood Palace, the son of the 6th Duke of Hamilton and his wife, Elizabeth. Styled as Marquess of Clydesdale from his birth until his father's death, he succeeded to his father's title of Duke of Hamilton in 1758, at the age of two.

Upon the death in 1761 of his distant cousin, the Duke of Douglas, he inherited the title of Marquess of Douglas. A dispute concerning the estate of the late Duke of Douglas led to the Douglas Cause.

Hamilton was educated at Eton from 1763 to 1767. However, he died in 1769, aged 14, at Hamilton Palace from a fever. He was interred in the family mausoleum at Hamilton, Scotland, and his titles passed to his younger brother, Douglas Hamilton.

Peerage of Scotland
Preceded by James Hamilton	Duke of Hamilton; 1758–1769	Succeeded by Douglas Hamilton
Preceded by Archibald Douglas	Marquess of Douglas; 1761–1769	Succeeded by Douglas Hamilton
Peerage of Great Britain
Preceded by James Hamilton	Duke of Brandon; 1758–1769	Succeeded by Douglas Hamilton
