= Gondelsheim =

- Municipality
- Flag Coat of arms

- Location of Gondelsheim within Karlsruhe district
- Interactive map of Gondelsheim
- Location within Germany Location within Baden-Württemberg
- Coordinates: 49°03′38″N 08°39′26″E
- Country: Germany
- State: Baden-Württemberg
- Admin. region: Karlsruhe
- District: Karlsruhe

Government
  - Mayor (2021–29): Markus Rupp

Area
  - Total: 14.86 km^{2} (5.74 sq mi)
- Elevation: 180 m (590 ft)

Population (2025-12-31)
  - Total: 4,139
  - Density: 278.5/km^{2} (721.4/sq mi)
- Time zone: UTC+01:00 (CET)
  - Summer (DST): UTC+02:00 (CEST)
- Postal codes: 75053
- Dialling codes: 07252
- Vehicle registration: KA
- Website: www.gondelsheim.de

Gondelsheim is a municipality in Northern Karlsruhe district in Baden-Württemberg, Germany. It is located on Bertha Benz Memorial Route 3 km northwest of Bretten and shares a direct border with that city.

== History ==
During the late 12th or early 13th century the village of Gondelsheim became a property of Herrenalb Abbey. Later it came into possession of the lords of Wiesloch, followed by the Counts of Hohenberg. During that period it was mortgaged to the Johanniter Order, and then to the Counts of Württemberg. In 1483 the latter sold the village and its castle to Palatine Hofmeister Blicker Landschad von Steinach. Eventually, the village was resold to the House of Katzenelnbogen.

Following a conflict between the local community and lord Georg Rudolf Knebel von Katzenelnbogen, in 1614 an agreement was concluded between the inhabitants of Gondelsheim and their ruler through the mediation of Electoral Palatinate. It limited the number of days on which locals could be employed for corvée labour, defined the amount of wood to be provided on the lord's demand, regulated the settlement of new inhabitants, the appointment of burgomasters, court proceedings and other issues.

As a result of the Thirty Years' War, after 1648 the population of Gondelsheim had decreased to only 80 inhabitants. In 1650 the Katzenelnbogen family sold the village to Freiherr of Mentzingen. The old agreement between the lords and community was confirmed, and the war damage was quickly overcome: by the mid-1650s the settlement had over 150 residents, with the number further increasing to 400 in 1687. In 1709 the territory on which the inhabitants were required to perform corvée labour was increased by 50%, which led to new conflicts.

Following a property conflict between the Freiherr of Mentzingen and a burgher of nearby Bretten, in 1727 the forces of Electoral Palatinate, which controlled the latter city, established a blockade of Gondelsheim and plundered the goods of local inhabitants, which led to popular dissatisfaction and emigration of parts of the population. That event was brought to the attention of Charles VI, Holy Roman Emperor, who in 1728 issued a decree demanding that the officials of Bretten stop their raids against Mentzingen's property.

After a new increase of corvée duties and due to the increasing appropriation of forest grounds by the Freiherr of Mentzingen, in 1730 the inhabitants of Gondelsheim launched a revolt under the leadership of burgomaster Johann Georg Ries. The uprising was supported by the authorities of Electoral Palatinate. The villagers refused to perform the duties put upon them by their lord, occupied the Freiherr's land plots and attacked his servants. As a direct subordinate of the Holy Roman Emperor, Mentzingen was supported by an imperial commission, which demanded that the inhabitants of Gondelsheim return to fulfilling their duties, abandon their relations with Electoral Palatnate and stop persecuting those who remained loyal to their lord.

Due to the rebels' refusal to comply, an imperial force was dispatched from Philippsburg in order to subdue the revolt. On 28 September, several leaders of the uprising were arrested and imprisoned. On 8 October 150 soldiers of the Electoral Palatinate approached Gondelsheim in order to force the imperials to retreat. The latter established their positions in the Freiherr's castle and were besieged by the Palatinate forces and rebels, who plundered and destroyed the lord's buildings. Following negotiations, on 31 October half of the siege force retreated to Bretten, which produced great insecurity among the rebels. On the next day the rest of the Palatinate army retreated as well, which allowed the locals who remained loyal to the Freiherr to return.

Following the retreat of Palatinate troops, the imperial force stayed in Gondelsheim, which caused large expenses for the local budget. Their retreat took place only in late 1733, after the beginning of the War of the Polish Succession. In May 1734 the imprisoned rebels were freed from the fortress of Philippsburg shortly before its siege by the French. During the same year, the area of Gondelsheim was devastated by French troops. Following the death of Johann Reinhard von Mentzingen, in 1737 his successors reached an agreement with Electoral Palatinate, restoring the 1614 agreement with their subjects, recognizing the Elector Palatine's authority in tax and escort affairs and allowing his serfs with an income of at least 300 gulden and respective papers to settle in Gondelsheim.

However, the rebelling peasants continued to argue against the authority of Mentzingen family. In 1739 and 1742 new imperial commissions visited the village to solve the conflict. During the second visit, the delegation was accompanied by 50 Württembergish grenadiers, which forced Ries and other rebel leaders to flee. In 1743 Charles VII, Holy Roman Emperor condemned the former burgomaster and three of his accomplices to five years of exile from Gondelsheim. Two of them asked the Mentzingen family for mercy and returned to the village soon thereafter. Ries and Georg Heck, another supporter of the rebellion, moved to nearby Diedelsheim. Following the bankruptcy of Mentzingens' properties in Gondelsheim in 1752, the ownership over the village became an object of an auction contested between Electoral Palatinate and the Margraviate of Baden-Durlach. In 1755 Ries and Heck were once again banished; the former died in 1757, while the latter was able to return in 1764 and died in Gondelsheim three years later.

In 1774 the burghers of Gondelsheim and the lord of the village agreed to exchange contested lands in an attempt to solve the almost half-century long conflict. Following the sale of the village to Baden-Durlach in 1787, the community attempted to overturn the agreement, which it saw as unjust. However, after a long process in 1802 the Reichshofrat confirmed the terms of the 1774 document.

== Jewish community ==
The first mention of Jews residing in Gondelsheim dates from 1548. A Jewish cemetery existed at least since 1632 on the outskirts of the village. By 1709 five Jewish families lived in Gondelsheim, with that number rising until the 19th century and reaching its peak in 1855 with 110 Jewish inhabitants. Since the 18th century a synagogue was active in the village. The new Romanseque Revival synagogue building was finished in 1849, and until 1876 also housed a Jewish school. By 1924 only 14 Jews remained in Gondelsheim. Next year, the synagogue was closed. Its building was later used by the New Apostolic Church and is currently in private ownership. Until 1933 two Jewish families living in Gondelsheim were active in cattle trade.

== Points of interest ==
Sights are the gothic-revival castle with the Old Tower and a replica of the Three Dancing Maidens fountain. The castle was inherited by Countess Louise von Langenstein und Gondelsheim, an illegitimate daughter of Louis I, Grand Duke of Baden, who in 1848 married the Swedish Count Carl Israel Wilhelm Douglas (1824–1898). Count Ludwig Wilhelm August von Langenstein and Gondelsheim had today's palace built in 1857. The Douglas family, living in Langenstein Castle, sold it in 2010.

== Gallery ==
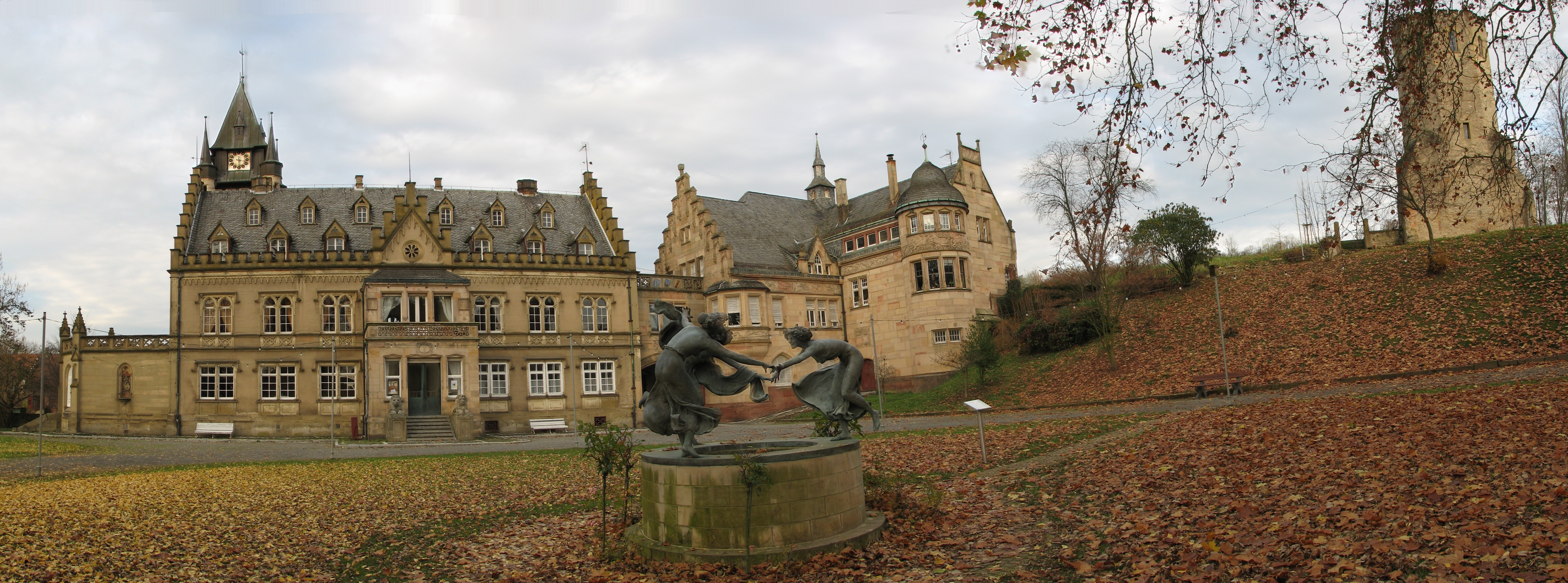
Gondelsheim Castle

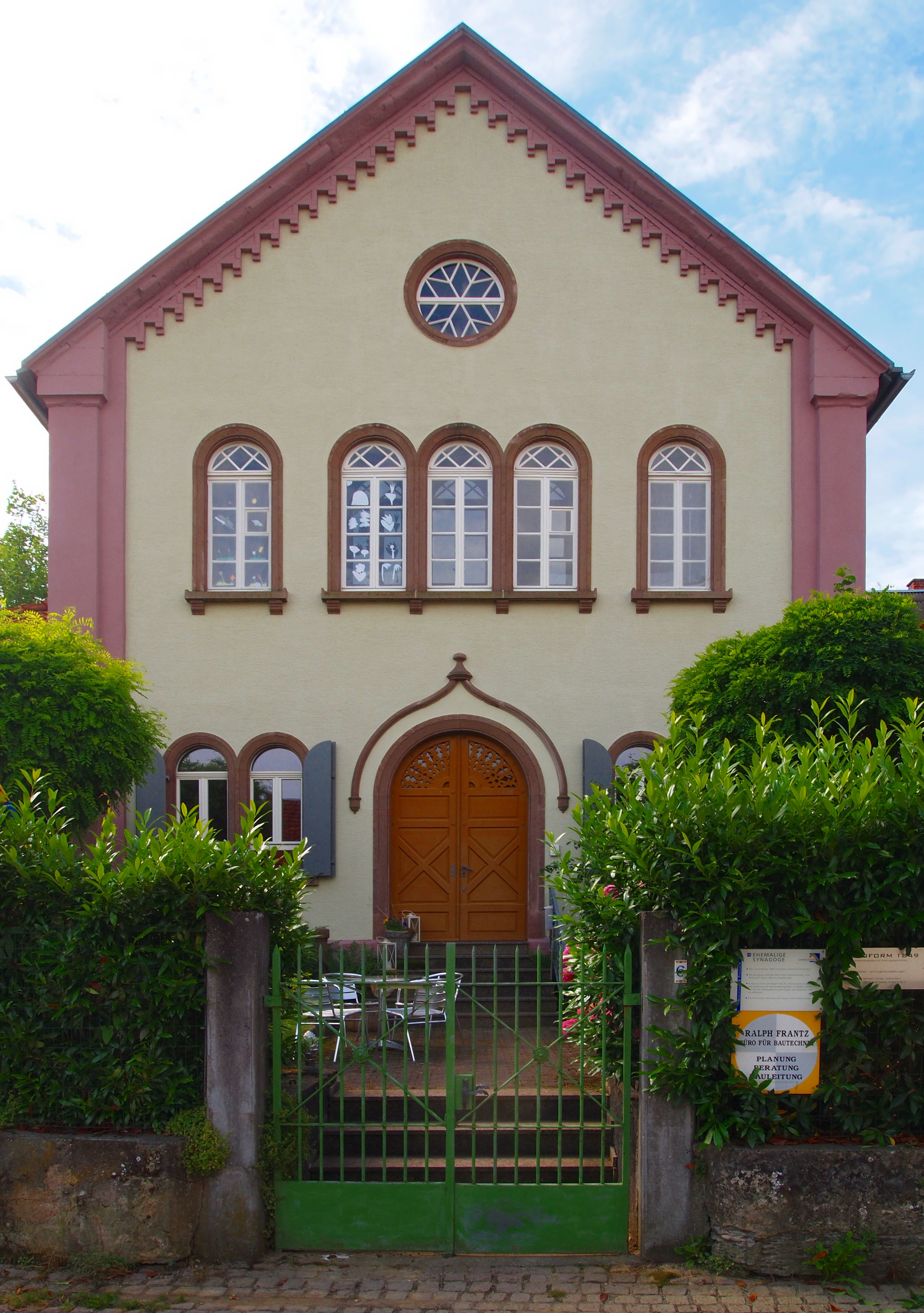
Former synagogue

== Sources ==
- Adam, Thomas (2005). Die Gondelsheimer Rebellion von 1730. Ein Bauernaufstand und seine Folgen. Heidelberg – Ubstadt-Weiher – Basel: verlag regionalkultur. ISBN 3897354098.
