= Clan Douglas =

Lowland Scottish clan

Douglas
- Dùbhghlas
- Crest: On a chapeau, a green salamander surrounded by fire
- Motto: Jamais arrière (Note: Translated: Never backwards, in a sense that the Douglas clan is always marching forwards, never going backwards in battle; the often used translation "Never behind" is misleading, in French this would be translated as Jamais derrière.); Tender and true; Forward
- Slogan: "A Douglas! A Douglas!"

Profile
- Region: Lowlands
- District: Lanarkshire, Lothian, Scottish Marches, Angus, Moray, Galloway and Dumfriesshire
- Plant badge: Rue
- Pipe music: Dumbarton's Drums
- Douglas no longer has a chief, and is an armigerous clan
- Historic seat: Douglas Castle
- Last Chief: His Grace Archibald Douglas; The 1st Duke of Douglas
- Died: 21 July 1761 (Note: His Grace Alexander Douglas-Hamilton, the 16th Duke of Hamilton is heir to the chiefdom of Douglas, but cannot assume the title of chief since the Lord Lyon King of Arms requires him to assume the single name Douglas.)
Septs of Douglas
Agnew, Bell, Blackadder, Blackett, Blacklock, Blackstock, Blackwood, Blaylock, Brown, Brownlee, Carmichael, Carruthers, Cavan, Crockett, Dalzell, Dickson, Douglass, Drysdale, Forest, Forrest, Forrester, Foster, Galbraith, GilPatrick, Hamilton, Home, Hume, Ingles, Inglis, Kilgore, Kilpatrick, Kirkland, Kirkpatrick, Lockerbie, Lockerby, MacGuffey, MacGuffock, McKittrick, Maxwell, Moffat, Morton, Pringle, Rowell, Rutherford, Sandilands, Simms, Syme, Symington, Turnbull, Weir, Young
Clan branches
- Black Douglas
- Red Douglas
- Douglas of Morton
- Douglas of Queensbury
- Douglas of Ormond and Forfar
- Douglas of Selkirk
- Douglas of Mains
See also: Douglas baronets
Allied clans
- Clan Bell
- Clan Hamilton
- Clan Carmichael
- Clan Kirkpatrick
- Clan Forrester
- Clan Carruthers
- Clan Maxwell (16th century)
- Clan Heron
- Clan Campbell
Rival clans
- Clan Stewart
- Clan Crichton
- Clan Gordon
- Clan Sandilands
- Clan Charteris
- Clan Johnstone
- Clan Colville
- Clan Scott
- Clan MacLellan
- Clan Ramsay
- Clan Maxwell (17th century)

Clan Douglas (Gaelic: Dùbhghlas) is an ancient clan or noble house from the Scottish Lowlands. Taking their name from Douglas in Lanarkshire, their leaders gained vast territories throughout the Borders, Angus, Lothian, Moray, and also in France and Sweden. The family is one of the most ennobled in the United Kingdom and has held numerous titles.

The Douglases were one of Scotland's most powerful families, and certainly the most prominent family in lowland Scotland during the Late Middle Ages, often holding the real power behind the throne of the Stewart kings. The heads of the House of Douglas held the titles of the Earl of Douglas (Black Douglas) and later the Earl of Angus (Red Douglas).

The clan does not have a chief recognised by the Lord Lyon. The principal Douglas is the Duke of Hamilton; as his surname is "Douglas-Hamilton" rather than simply "Douglas", the laws of the Lyon Court prevent him from assuming the chiefship of the name. The original caput of the family was Douglas Castle in Lanarkshire. The Kirk of St Bride at Douglas, along with Melrose Abbey and the Abbey of Saint-Germain-des-Prés holds the remains of many of the Earls of Douglas and Angus. The Swedish branch is descended from Field Marshal Robert Douglas, Count of Skenninge, and has been one of Sweden's most prominent noble families since the 17th century.

== History ==
=== Origins ===
In modern texts, the family's surname is thought to derive from the village of Douglas, the name of which comes from the Gaelic elements dubh, meaning "dark, black"; and glas, meaning "stream" (in turn from Old Gaelic dub and glais). However, according to the 17th-century historian Frederic van Bossen, the Douglas name means "gray hairs in the old language", and it was first given to a Lord Shulton, who lived in the 8th century. Frederic van Bossen states Lord Shulton was a descendant of Adrolena of Shaultow who was a descendant of the Princes of Caledonia.

In 1179 William Douglas was Lord of Douglas; he is the first certain record of the name Douglas and undoubtedly the ancestor of the family. He witnessed a charter between 1175 and 1199 by the Bishop of Glasgow to the monks of Kelso. His grandson, also Sir William de Douglas had two sons who fought at the Battle of Largs in 1263 against the Norsemen. One old tradition is that the first chief of Douglas was Sholto Douglas who helped the king of Scotland win a battle in the year 767. This is not substantiated and likely to be pseudohistory.

The true progenitor of Clan Douglas may have been "Theobaldus Flammatius" (Theobald the Fleming), who in 1147 received the lands near Douglas Water in Lanarkshire in return for services for the Abbot of Kelso, who held the barony and lordship of Holydean. The Douglas family names consisted of Arkenbald and Freskin, and were believed to be related to the Clan Murray, believed to be descended from a Flemish knight called Freskin. It seems likely that he was the father of the first William Douglas; however the Flemish origin of the Douglases is disputed; it is claimed by some that the lands which were granted to Theobald the Fleming were not the lands from which the Douglas family later emerged.

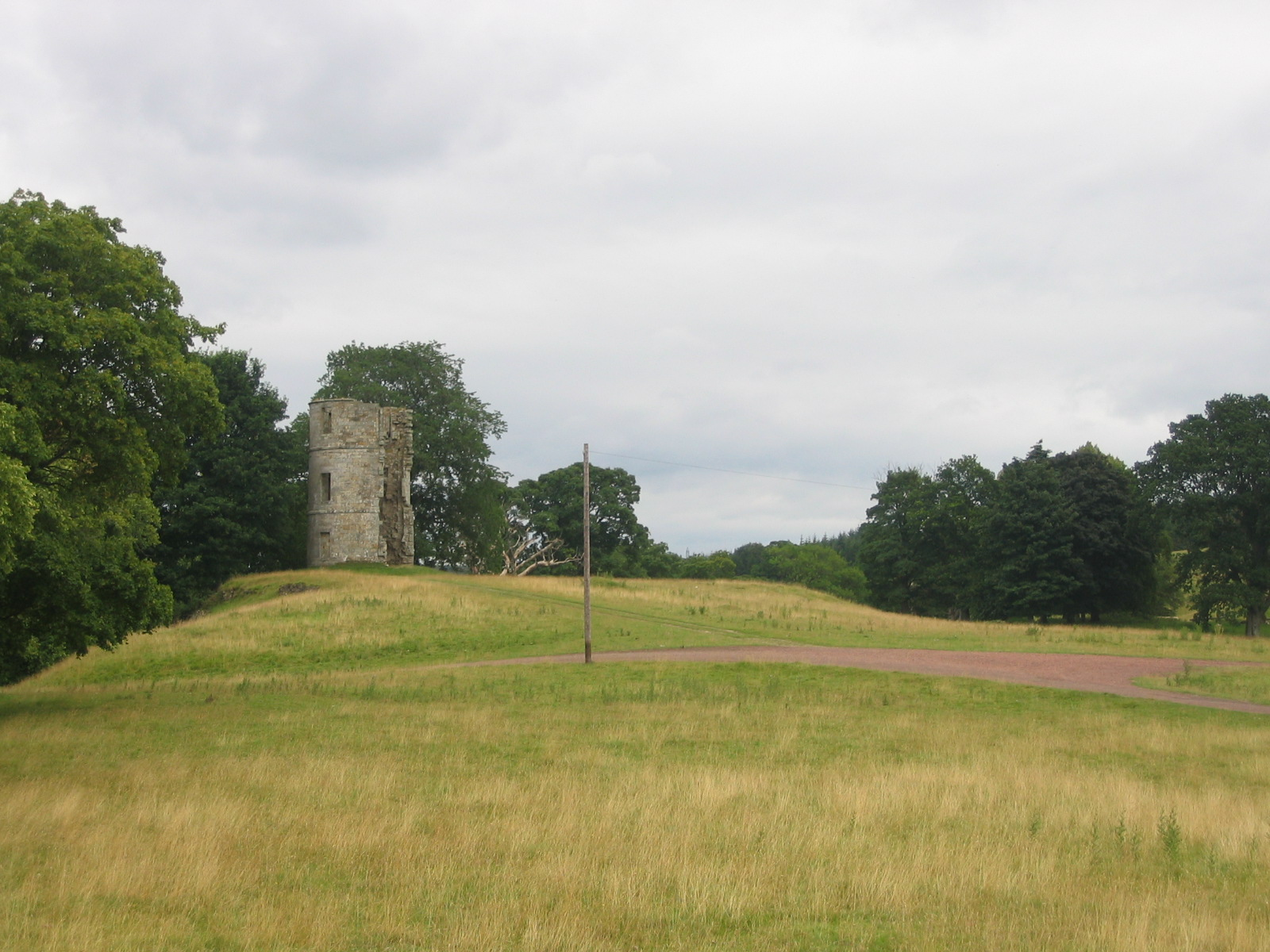
Ruin of Douglas Castle, South Lanarkshire

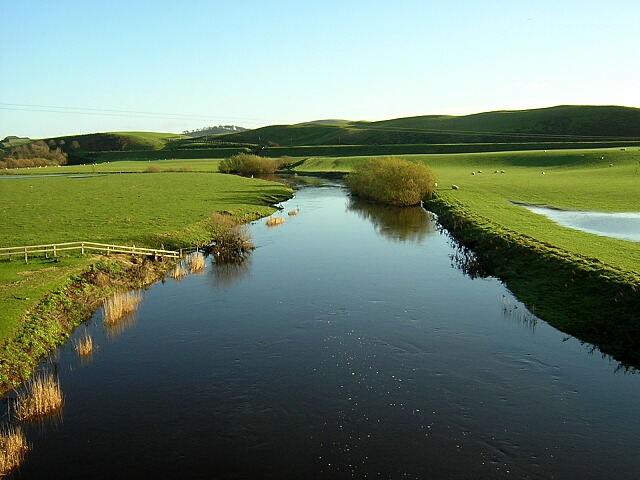
Douglas Water (dubh glass, the dark stream)

Clan Murray coat of arms

Original coat of arms of Clan Douglas

Coat of arms of Clan Douglas from 1330, with the Heart of King Robert the Bruce

=== Wars of Scottish Independence ===
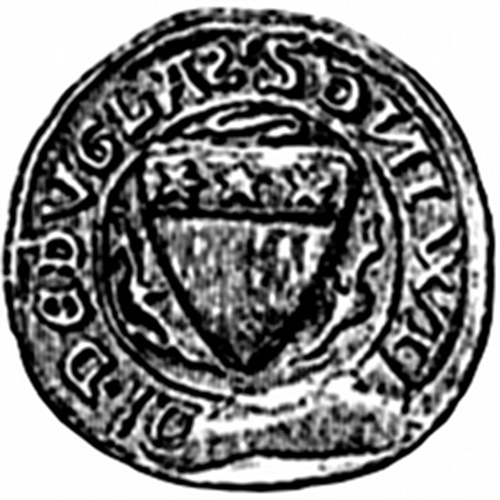
Seal of William Douglas the Hardy

During the Wars of Scottish Independence, Sir William Douglas "le Hardi," Lord of Douglas (1243 – c. 1298), was governor of Berwick-upon-Tweed when the town and Berwick Castle were besieged by the English. Douglas was captured and was released only after he had agreed to accept the claim of Edward I of England to be overlord of Scotland. He subsequently joined William Wallace in fighting for Scottish independence, but was captured and taken to England, where he died in 1298, a prisoner in the Tower of London.

==== The "Good" Sir James Douglas or "Black Douglas" ====
William Le Hardi's son, James Douglas, "The Good Sir James" (c. 1286–1330), was the first to acquire the epithet "the Black". He shared in the early misfortunes of Robert the Bruce and in the defeats at Methven and Dalrigh in 1306. But for both men these setbacks provided a valuable lesson in tactics: limitations in both resources and equipment meant that the Scots would always be at a disadvantage in conventional medieval warfare. By the time the fighting flared up again in the spring of 1307 they had learned the value of guerrilla warfare – known at the time as "secret war" – using fast-moving, lightly equipped and agile forces to maximum effect against an enemy often dependent on static defensive positions. Sir James Douglas recaptured Roxburgh Castle from the English in 1313. He was made a knight banneret, a high honor, and fought at the Battle of Bannockburn in 1314.

John Barbour recounts that the English called Sir James "The Black Douglas" for what they considered his dark deeds. According to Sir Walter Scott, he became the bogeyman of a Northern English lullaby "Hush ye, hush ye, little pet ye. Hush ye, hush ye, do not fret ye. The Black Douglas shall not get ye." Unsubstantiated theories point to his colouring and complexion, but this is tenuous. Douglas appears only in English records as "The Black" – Scots chronicles almost always referred to him as "The Guid" or "The Good". Later Douglas lords took the by-name of their revered forebear in the same way that they attached the image of Bruce's heart to their coat of arms: to strike fear into the hearts of their enemies and to exhibit the prowess of their race.

==== Crusader ====
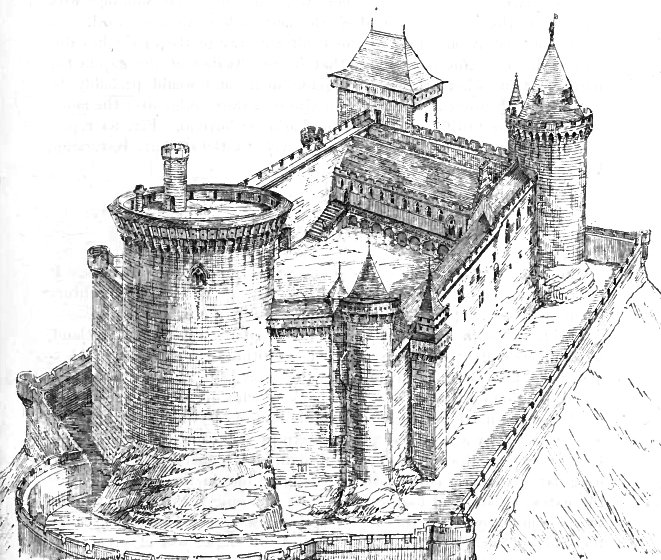
Bothwell Castle, a seat of the Black Douglases from 1362 to 1455

King Robert the Bruce had requested that Douglas, latterly his most esteemed companion in arms, should carry his heart to the Holy Land, as atonement for the murder of John III Comyn. In 1330 Douglas, en route to the East with a company of Scots men-at-arms, joined the forces of Alfonso XI of Castile, Edward III of England's cousin by his mother Queen Isabella, to fight against the Moors of Granada at the siege of Teba. Here Sir James was killed. Accounts vary of how he died but he is generally depicted either outnumbered or alone, fighting against overwhelming odds. The casket containing the heart of the Bruce was recovered and returned to Scotland, to be interred at Melrose Abbey.

Douglas' bones were boiled and returned to Scotland. Tradition claimed that his embalmed heart was lodged in the Douglas vaults at the Kirk of St Bride. Meanwhile, his bones are not in the stone vault lying under his effigy and they have yet to be located. By 1333, King Robert's "bloody heart" was incorporated in the arms of Sir James' son, William, Lord of Douglas. It subsequently appeared, sometimes with a royal crown, in every branch of the Douglas family.

==== Sir Archibald Douglas, Guardian of the Realm ====
The Scottish army that fought and lost the Battle of Halidon Hill in 1333 was led by James' youngest brother who had been elected Regent of Scotland in late March 1333. Sir Archibald Douglas has been badly treated by some historians; frequently misidentifying this Douglas warrior as the Tyneman or loser when the moniker was intended for a later less fortunate but equally warlike Archibald. He was mentioned in Barbour's The Brus for his great victory during the Weardale campaign; leading the Scottish army further south into County Durham he devastated the lands and took much booty from Darlington and other nearby towns and villages.

Sir James 'The Good' Douglas' son William succeeded to the title as Lord of Douglas but may not have completed his title to the estates, possibly because he might have been underage. He died at Halidon Hill with his uncle, Sir Archibald Douglas. James' younger brother, Hugh the Dull, Lord of Douglas, a canon serving the See of Glasgow and held a prebendary at Roxburgh became Lord Douglas in 1342; Hugh of Douglas resigned his title to his nephew, the youngest surviving son of the Regent Archibald, William Lord of Douglas who was to become the first Earl. The First Earl's legitimate son James Douglas, 2nd Earl of Douglas succeeded him. His illegitimate son by Margaret Stewart, 3rd Countess of Angus was George Douglas, 1st Earl of Angus, who was the progenitor of the Earls of Angus also known as the "Red Douglases".

The prestige of the family was greatly increased when James Douglas's great nephew, James Douglas, 2nd Earl of Douglas married Isabel, a daughter of King Robert II of Scotland. In 1388 at the Battle of Otterburn he was instrumental to the Scots' victory but was killed during the fighting. Leaving no legitimate heir, his titles passed to the illegitimate son of his great-uncle.

=== 15th century ===
Arms of Sir James Douglas

Arms of Sir Archibald Douglas

Arms of the Earl of Douglas

Arms of the Duke of Douglas

Arms of the Duke of Hamilton

Arms of the Earl of Morton

Arms of Douglas of Mar

Arms of Douglas of Mains

Arms of Douglas of Mar as Marquess and Duke of Queensberry

==== Wars with England ====
Archibald Douglas, 3rd Earl of Douglas did much to consolidate the family's power and influence. He successfully defended Edinburgh Castle against Henry IV of England in 1400 but died the following year. His son, Archibald Douglas, 4th Earl of Douglas, married the daughter of Robert III of Scotland. The fourth Earl fought against King Henry IV of England at the Battle of Shrewsbury in 1403, where he was taken prisoner.

In 1406, with the death of the king, the 4th Earl of Douglas became one of the council of regents to rule Scotland during the childhood of James I of Scotland. In 1412, the 4th Earl had visited Paris, when he entered into a personal alliance with John the Fearless, Duke of Burgundy, and in 1423, he commanded a contingent of 10,000 Scots sent to the aid of Charles VII of France against the English. He was made lieutenant-general in Joan of Arc's French army, and received the title Duke of Touraine, with remainder to his heirs-male, on 19 April 1424. The newly created French duke was defeated and slain at Battle of Verneuil on 17 August 1424, along with his second son, James, and son-in-law John Stewart, Earl of Buchan.

==== Black Dinner ====
On 24 November 1440, the 16-year-old William Douglas, 6th Earl of Douglas, and his younger brother David were invited to dine with the ten-year-old King James II of Scotland. Later called the Black Dinner, the occasion was organised by Sir William Crichton, Lord Chancellor of Scotland, along with James Douglas, the uncle of William and David's late father; James stood to inherit the young Earl's wealth and titles. While they ate, a black bull's head, a symbol of death, was brought in and placed before the Earl. Over the protests of the young King James II, the two brothers were then dragged out to Castle Hill, given a mock trial and beheaded. Clan Douglas then laid siege to Edinburgh Castle. Perceiving the danger, Crichton surrendered the castle to the king and was rewarded with the title Lord Crichton. It is still unclear exactly who else was ultimately responsible, though it is thought Livingston and Buchan were likely candidates. However, it was James Douglas and his son who profited.

==== Clan conflicts ====
In 1448, Hugh Douglas, Earl of Ormond led a Scottish force to victory against an English army at the Battle of Sark. Sir Alexander Gordon created Earl of Huntly in 1449. At this time the king was at enmity with the Black Douglases. The Gordons stood on the king's side, and with their men involved in the south of the country, Archibald Douglas, Earl of Moray took the opportunity to sack the Gordon lands, setting Huntly Castle ablaze. However, the Gordons returned and quickly destroyed their enemies. Although the castle was burned to the ground, a grander castle was built in its place. The Douglases had a long feud with Clan Colville. Sir Richard Colville had killed the Laird of Auchinleck who was an ally of the Douglases. To avenge this murder the Douglases attacked the Colvilles in their castle, where many were killed. The Douglases levelled the Colvilles' castle and put their men to the sword. William Douglas, 8th Earl of Douglas personally executed Richard Colville.

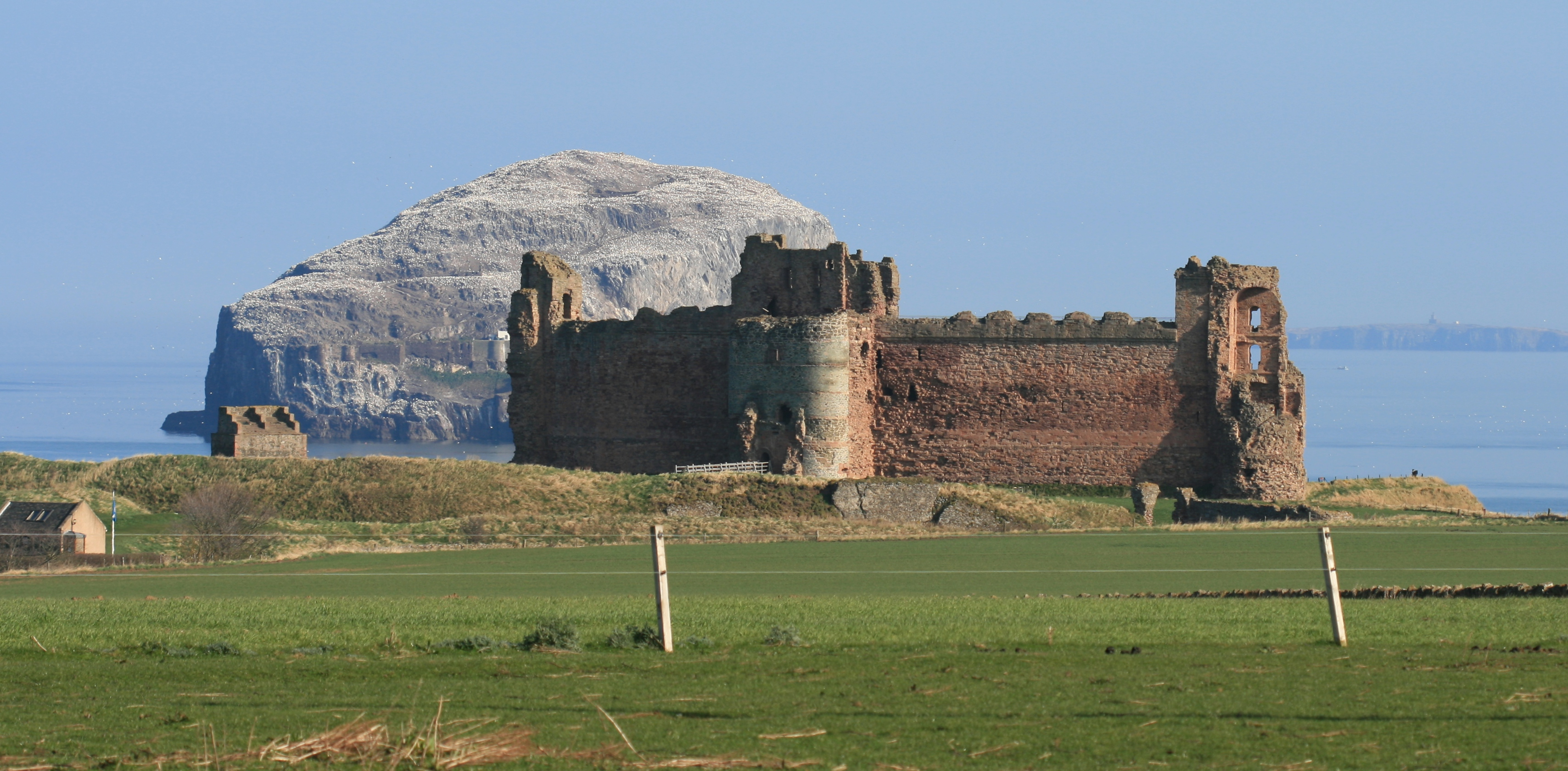
Tantallon Castle, seat of the "Red Douglases" 1389−1699

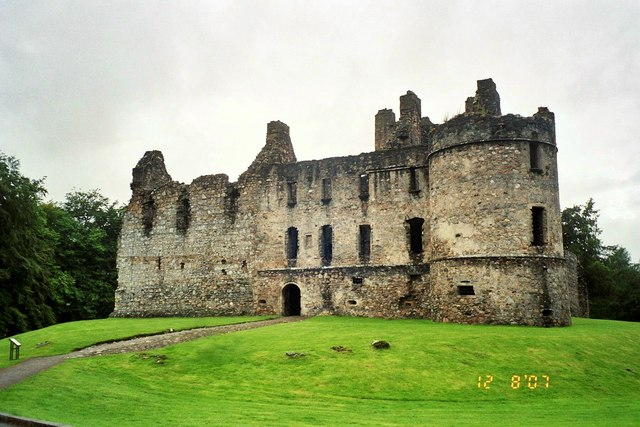
The ruins of Balvenie Castle, a stronghold of the Douglases from 1362 to 1455 and seat of John Douglas, Lord of Balvenie

==== Murder of the Earl of Douglas by King James II ====
After fruitless feuding with the Douglases, the King invited William Douglas, 8th Earl of Douglas to Stirling Castle in 1452 under the promise of safe conduct, but then the King accused the Earl of conspiracy in his dealings with the Yorkists in England and through a pact made between Douglas, the Earl of Crawford and the Lord of the Isles. Upon Douglas' refusal to repudiate the pact and reaffirm his loyalty to James II, the King drew his dagger and stabbed Douglas in the throat. The story goes that the King's Captain of the Guard then finished off the Earl with a pole axe. The body was thrown from the window into a garden below, where it was later given burial. A stained glass window bearing the Douglas Arms now overlooks "Douglas Garden", the spot where the Earl is said to have fallen.

==== Feud with the Royal Stewarts ====
In 1455, James Douglas, 9th Earl of Douglas (the Black Douglas) rebelled against the king but his forces were defeated at the Battle of Arkinholm by the king's forces who were commanded by George Douglas, 4th Earl of Angus (the Red Douglas). This brought an end to the Black Douglases. After the battle an act of parliament gave the Earl of Angus the lordship of Douglas with the original possessions of his ancestors in Douglasdale. The 9th Earl of Douglas was later defeated by the forces of King James III of Scotland at the Battle of Lochmaben Fair in 1484.

=== 16th-century conflicts ===
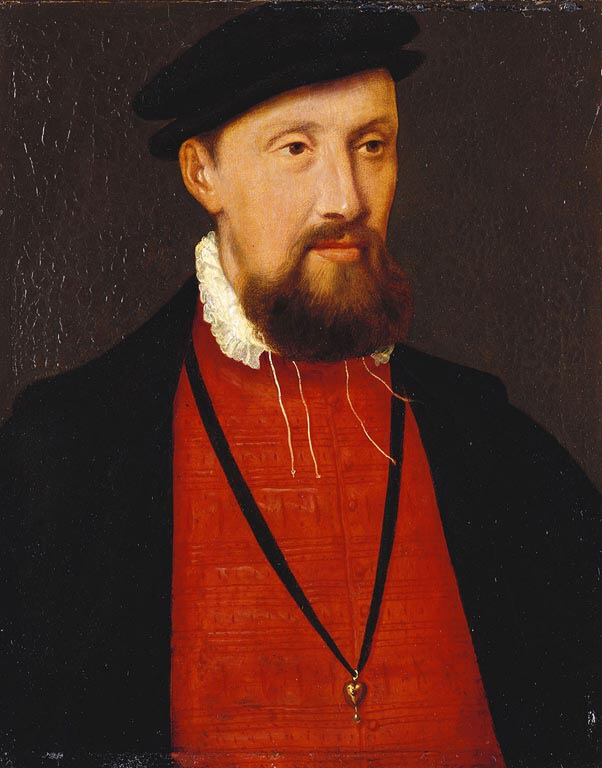
Archibald Douglas, 6th Earl of Angus (1490–1557), husband of Margaret Tudor, widow of James IV, mother of James V (whose guardian he became), and elder sister of Henry VIII of England.

In 1513, there was a strong Douglas contingent at the Battle of Flodden, where two of Archibald Douglas, 5th Earl of Angus's sons were killed along with 200 men of the name of Douglas. In 1526, Archibald Douglas, 6th Earl of Angus defeated Walter Scott of Branxholme and Buccleuch, chief of Clan Scott, at the Battle of Melrose, who was attempting to rescue the young James V of Scotland from Douglas.

A dispute occurred in 1530, when Sir Robert Charteris, the 8th Laird and chief of Clan Charteris fought a duel with Sir James Douglas of Drumlanrig in what was said to have been one of the last great chivalric contests. It was fought with all the observance of a medieval tournament with heralds and the king himself watching from the castle walls. The joust was apparently fought with such fury that Charteris' sword was broken and the king had to send his men-at-arms to part the combatants.

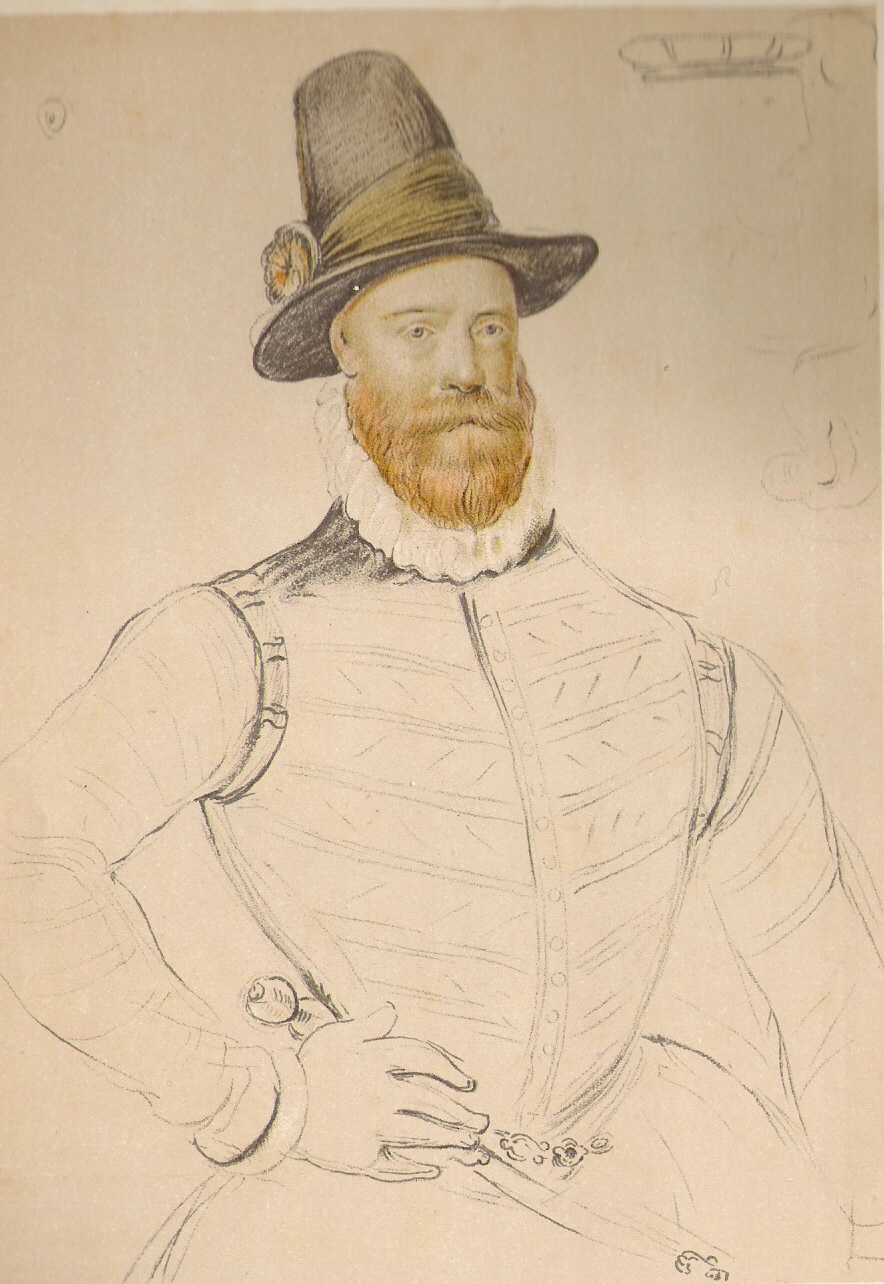
James Douglas, 4th Earl of Morton, Regent of Scotland

Archibald Douglas, 6th Earl of Angus held the post of Lord Chancellor and became guardian of James V of Scotland by marrying his widowed mother, Margaret Tudor, sister of Henry VIII of England, with whom he had a daughter, Margaret Douglas, mother of Henry Stuart, Lord Darnley. In 1545, Angus led his forces to victory at the Battle of Ancrum Moor where they defeated the English army during the Rough Wooing, and he was also present at the defeat in 1547 at the Battle of Pinkie Cleugh.

James Douglas, 4th Earl of Morton, nephew of the 6th Earl of Angus, was a bitter enemy of Mary, Queen of Scots. He was one of the murderers of the queen's secretary David Rizzio and was heavily implicated in the murder of her second husband Lord Darnley. In 1572 he was elected regent for the still minor King James VI. In many respects Morton was an energetic and capable ruler, but he was brutal in crushing factions still loyal to Queen Mary. Regent Morton was finally forced to resign in March 1578, but retained much of his power. Ultimately, he was accused of complicity in the murder of Darnley and was executed in 1581.

=== 17th century and the Bishops' War ===
During the Wars of the Three Kingdoms, William Douglas, 11th Earl of Angus, a Catholic, was a supporter of King Charles I. In 1633, he was created Marquess of Douglas. Following the Battle of Kilsyth in 1645, he joined James Graham, 1st Marquess of Montrose, and was present when Royalist forces fought Covenanter cavalry at the Battle of Philiphaugh where he barely escaped with his life. Following Cromwell's victory, he was able to make peace and was fined £1,000.

In 1660, William Douglas, the brother of the second Marquess of Douglas became, through marriage, the Duke of Hamilton. Eventually, the titles of Marquess of Douglas, Earl of Angus, and several others devolved to the Dukes of Hamilton and the heir of that house is always styled Marquess of Douglas and Clydesdale. The Douglas and Hamilton lines became Douglas-Hamilton and, under Scots law, are barred from inheriting the title of chief of Clan Douglas due to the hyphenated surname. This similarly applies to the Douglas-Home family who joined their surnames in the nineteenth century. In 1689, James Douglas, Earl of Angus raised the Cameronian regiment (Earl of Angus's regiment). Although greatly outnumbered, the regiment managed to defeat a larger Jacobite force at the Battle of Dunkeld. The regiment was victorious under the command of Captain George Munro, 1st of Auchinbowie.

=== 18th century and the Jacobite risings ===
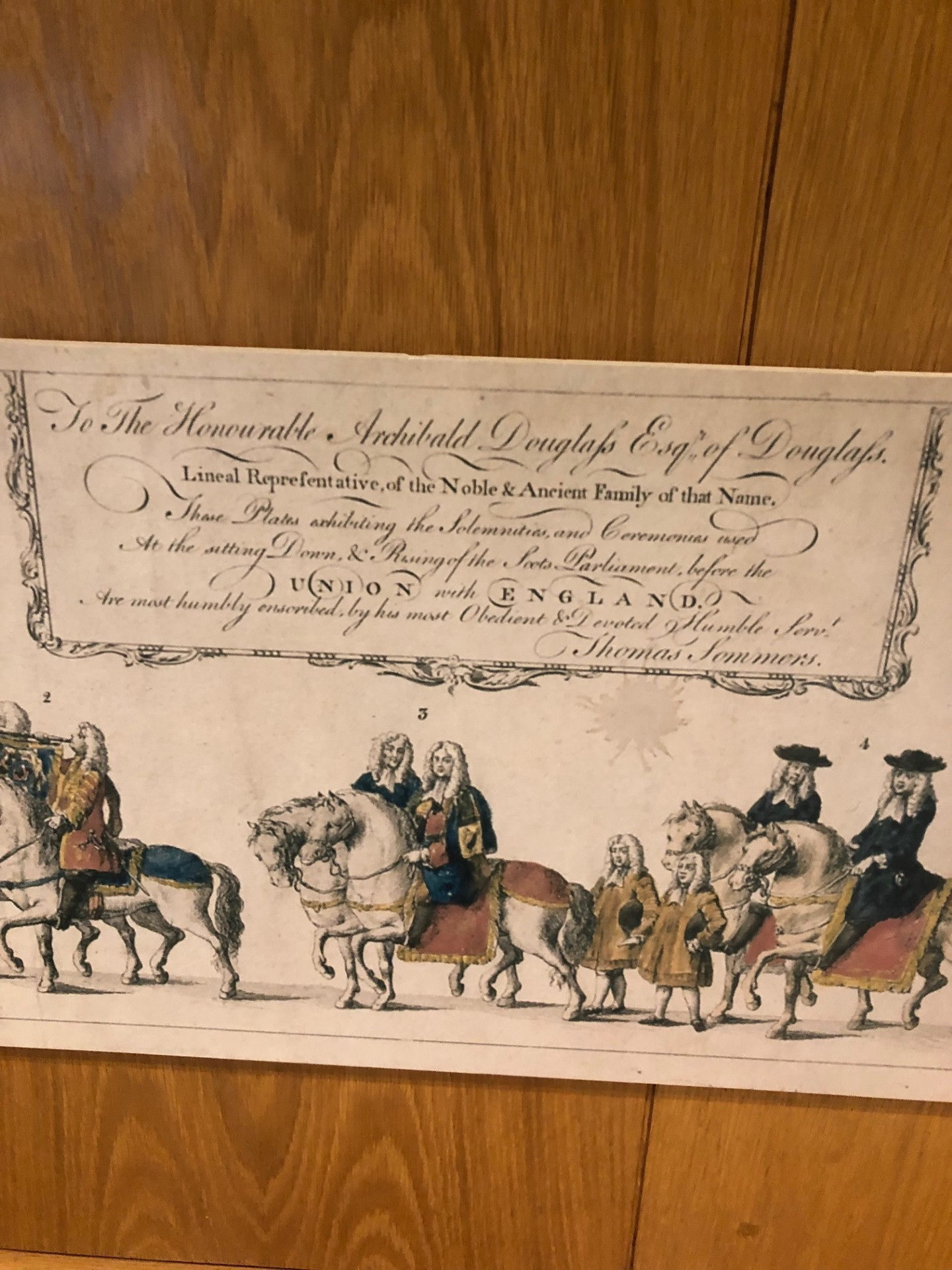
Archibald Douglas of Douglas at the sitting down and rising of the Scots' Parliament before the Acts of Union 1707 as shown in the Scottish Parliament Building visitor centre

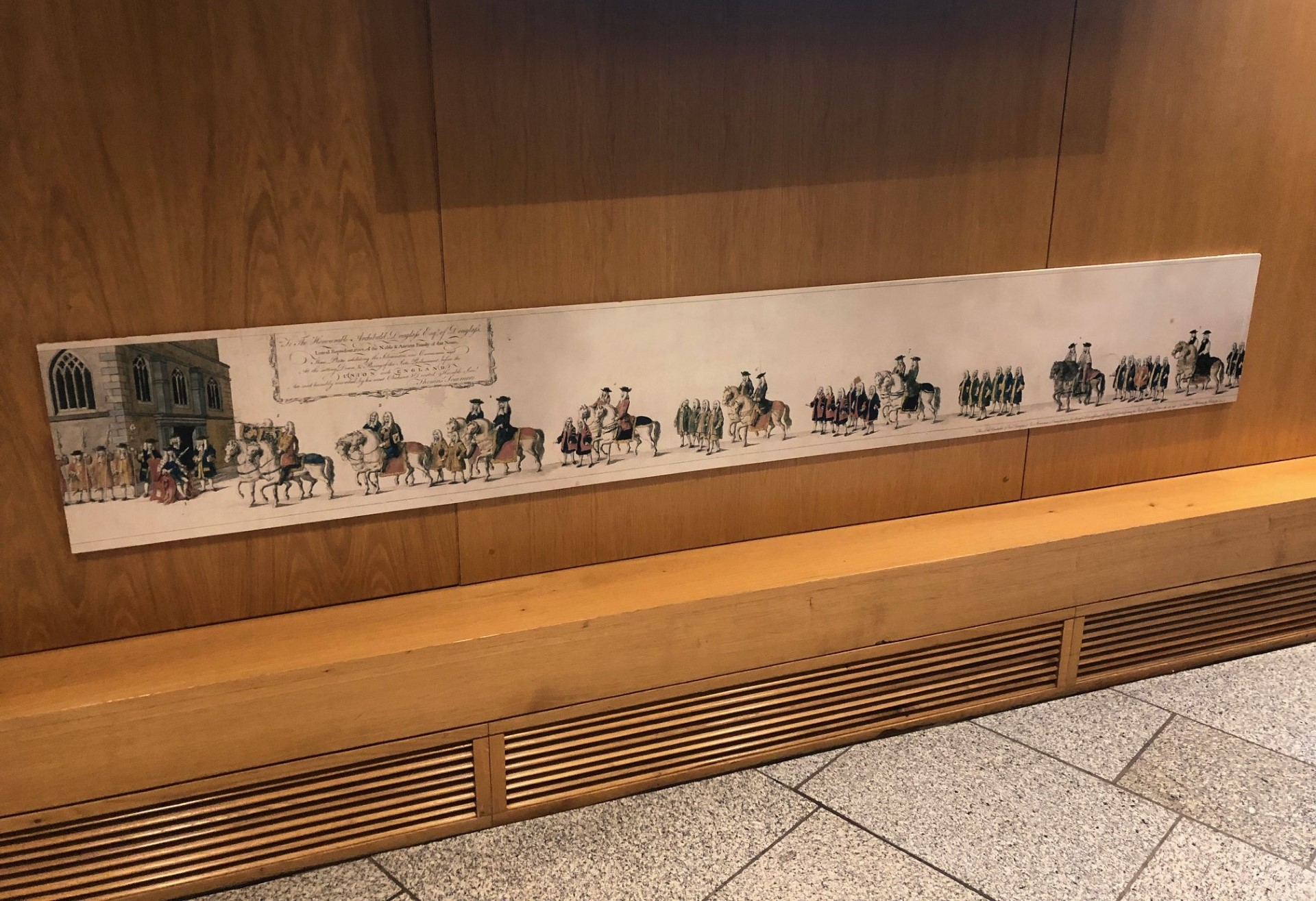
Archibald Douglas of Douglas at the sitting down and rising of the Scots' Parliament before the Acts of Union 1707 as shown in the Scottish Parliament Building visitor centre

In 1703, the Marquisate of Douglas was elevated to a Dukedom. Archibald Douglas, 1st Duke of Douglas married Margaret Douglas (a distant relation) late in life and had no direct heir – the title of Duke became extinct on his death. By the late 17th century, more political power was wielded by the Douglases of Drumlanrig, in Dumfriesshire who are also descended from the Black Douglases. The Douglases of Drumlanrig had become Earl of Queensberry in 1633, Marquises in 1682 and Dukes in 1684. The maneuvers of James Douglas, 2nd Duke of Queensberry, contributed to the Union of 1707.

During the Jacobite risings of the 18th century the Douglases continued their support for the British Government. Archibald Douglas, 1st Duke of Douglas led the volunteer horse at Battle of Sheriffmuir during the Jacobite rising of 1715. Also at that fight was the Duke's young cousin, Archibald Douglas, 2nd Earl of Forfar, colonel of the 3rd Regiment of foot, and who died of wounds taken there shortly afterward. Douglas Castle was burnt by the Highland armies of Bonnie Prince Charlie in the Jacobite rising of 1745. Douglas Castle was again burnt down in 1755, and the Duke commenced work on a new edifice designed by Robert Adam.

Building work ceased on the Duke's death in 1761, and with it his Dukedom became extinct. The Marquisate of Douglas and Earldom of Angus devolved to James Hamilton, 7th Duke of Hamilton, the senior male-line descendant of William Douglas, 1st Marquess of Douglas, his great-great-great-grandfather, by the way of his son, Lord William Douglas, 1st Earl of Selkirk, whom upon his marriage to Anne Hamilton, 3rd Duchess of Hamilton, became William Hamilton, Duke of Hamilton, the adoption of the surname Hamilton being one of the conditions to inheriting the Dukedom. His descendants would later add Douglas back to the surname and become the Douglas-Hamilton branch.

=== 20th century and the World Wars ===
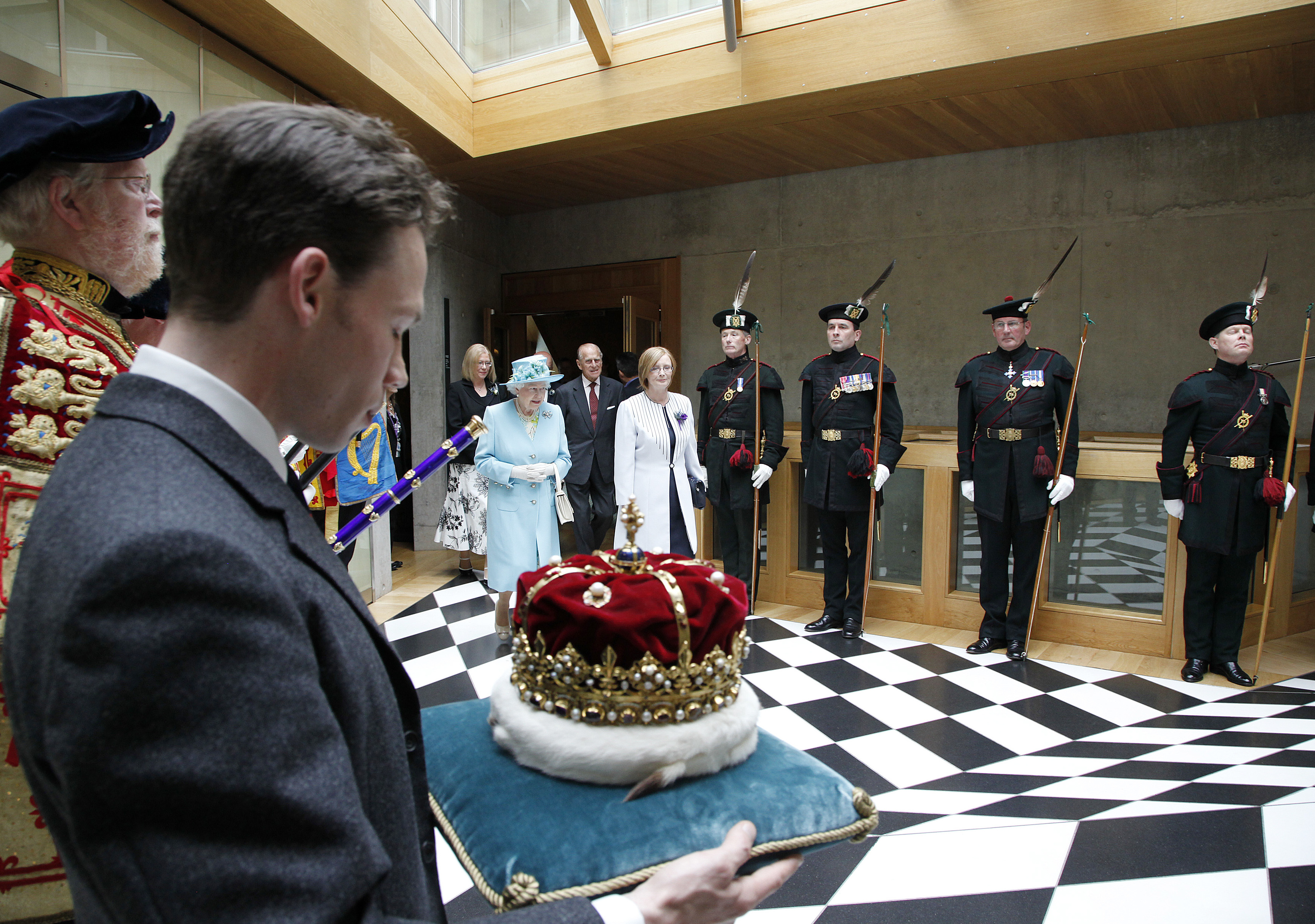
Elizabeth II opening the Scottish Parliament, with Alexander Douglas-Hamilton, 16th Duke of Hamilton, traditionally carrying the Crown of Scotland (2011)

In 1895, Alfred Douglas-Hamilton inherited the Dukedom of Hamilton from his cousin William Douglas-Hamilton, 12th Duke of Hamilton and became Alfred Douglas-Hamilton, 13th Duke of Hamilton. Alfred Douglas-Hamilton was the great-great-great-grandson of James Hamilton, 4th Duke of Hamilton through a collateral line. During World War I, Hamilton Palace, the main family seat, was used as a hospital with his blessing.

During World War II, his sons, Douglas Douglas-Hamilton, 14th Duke of Hamilton, George Douglas-Hamilton, 10th Earl of Selkirk, Lord Malcolm Douglas-Hamilton, and Lord David Douglas-Hamilton made history by all being squadron leaders or above at the outbreak of the war. Lord David Douglas-Hamilton was killed in action in 1944. The 14th Duke of Hamilton was the first man to fly over Mt. Everest. His son, Angus Douglas-Hamilton, 15th Duke of Hamilton was also in the Royal Air Force and achieved the rank of flight lieutenant during his service in the Cold War. He was the father of the current Duke, Alexander Douglas-Hamilton, 16th Duke of Hamilton. The current heir apparent to the Dukedom is the 16th Duke's son, Douglas Charles Douglas-Hamilton, Marquess of Douglas and Clydesdale.

=== The Swedish-German branch ===
Coat of arms of Douglas of Skenninge, Swedish branch of Clan Douglas

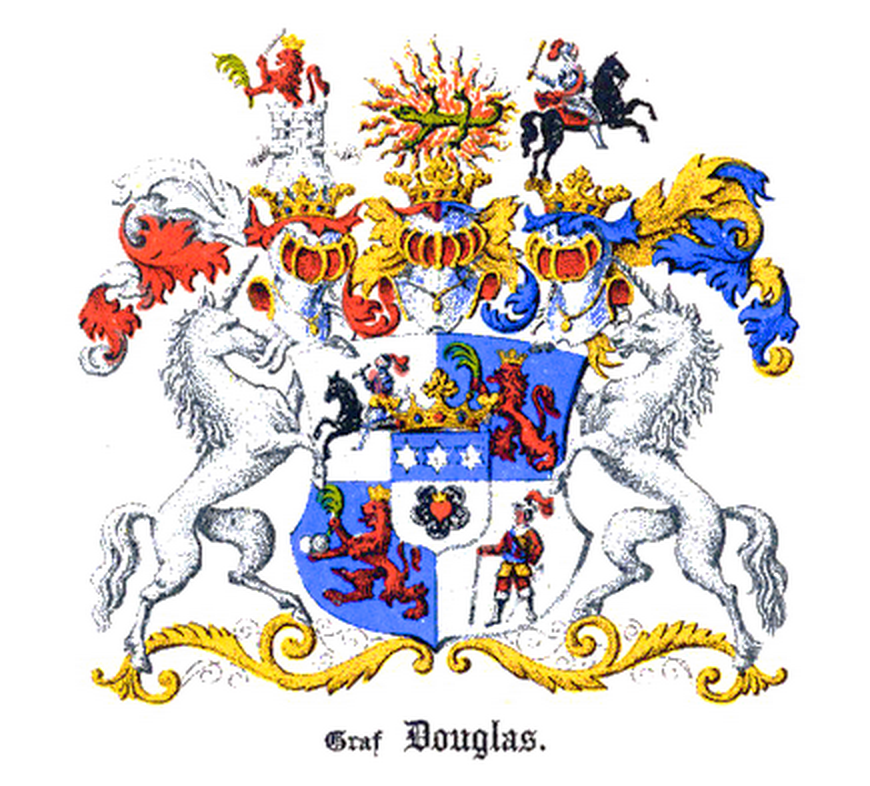
German Coat of arms of the comital Douglas family; the escutcheon is the Scottish Douglas arms

The lineage of the Swedish branch of the Douglas of Dalkeith line begins with James Douglas, documented in 1353, died in 1420. His descendant Sir William Douglas of Whittingehame (which had come from the Earls of March by marriage to James Douglas of Dalkeith in 1372) became English ambassador to the royal Danish court at Copenhagen in 1603. His grandson, the Scottish-born Robert Douglas (1611–1662), transplanted this branch of the Scottish clan to Sweden when in 1627 he became an officer in the Thirty Years' War; In 1657 he became field marshal. He received the Swedish title of Baron in 1651 and the title of Count (the highest title awarded to non-royalty in Sweden) in 1654. He was enfeoffed with the county of Skänninge and introduced in 1654 to the class of counts of the Swedish nobility under No. 19. From 1655 he built Stjärnorp Castle in Östergötland, which is still an ancestral seat of the Swedish branch today, besides Ekensholm Castle and Rydboholm Castle. The escutcheon of the Swedish Douglas family's arms is the Scottish Douglas arms.

Robert Douglas' descendants, the Swedish counts Douglas (the title is not primogenitary, but is held by all members of the line), are one of Sweden's most prominent noble families since the mid 17th century and has included numerous prominent individuals, such as Foreign Minister Ludvig Douglas. Count Gustaf Douglas was an important entrepreneur. His sisters are Rosita Spencer-Churchill, Duchess of Marlborough, and Princess Elisabeth, Duchess in Bavaria, the wife of Prince Max, Duke in Bavaria. Walburga Habsburg, Countess Douglas, the daughter of Austria-Hungary's last crown prince, is a member of this family by her marriage to Count Archibald Douglas.

Through a marriage in 1848 to Countess Louise von Langenstein und Gondelsheim, an illegitimate daughter of Louis I, Grand Duke of Baden, the Swedish Count Carl Israel Wilhelm Douglas (1824–1898) came into possession of Langenstein Castle in Baden, near Lake Constance. Their children achieved important political offices in both Sweden and Germany: their son Count Wilhelm Douglas (1848-1908) was a member of the German Reichstag, his brother Count Ludvig Douglas (1849–1916) was the Swedish foreign minister, and their grandson count Archibald Douglas (1883–1960) was chief of staff of the Swedish army. In 1906, the grandson, Count Karl Robert (1880-1955), second husband of Augusta Victoria of Hohenzollern, titular Queen consort of Portugal, took up his main residence at Langenstein Castle, which his descendants still live in today. The castle and the surrounding estate is owned by Count Leopold Douglas (b. 1989), which he inherited from his father Count Christoph Douglas (1948-2016), who bought it in 2014 from his cousin, Count Axel Douglas (b. 1943).

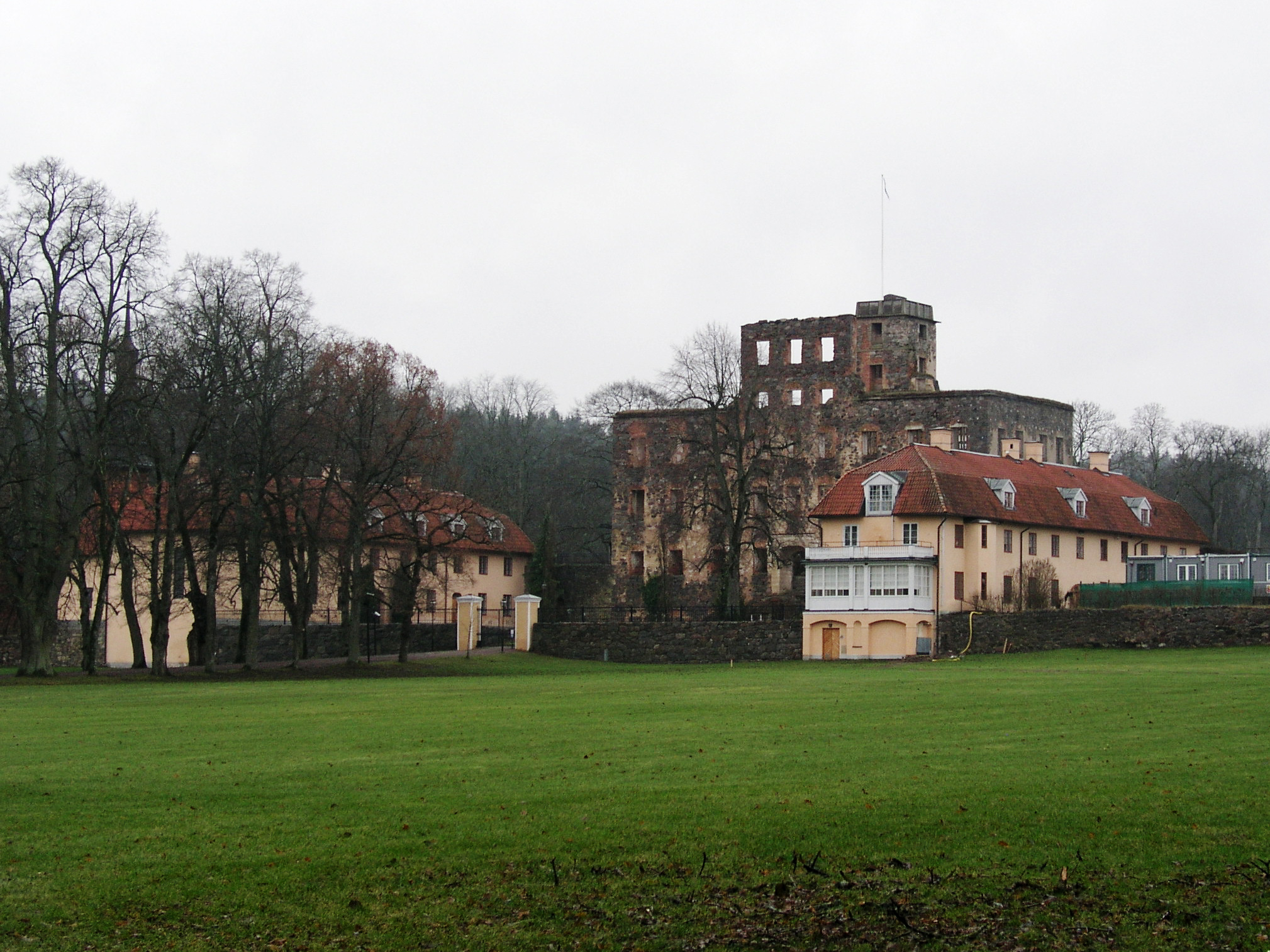
Stjärnorp Castle, Östergötland (Sweden)

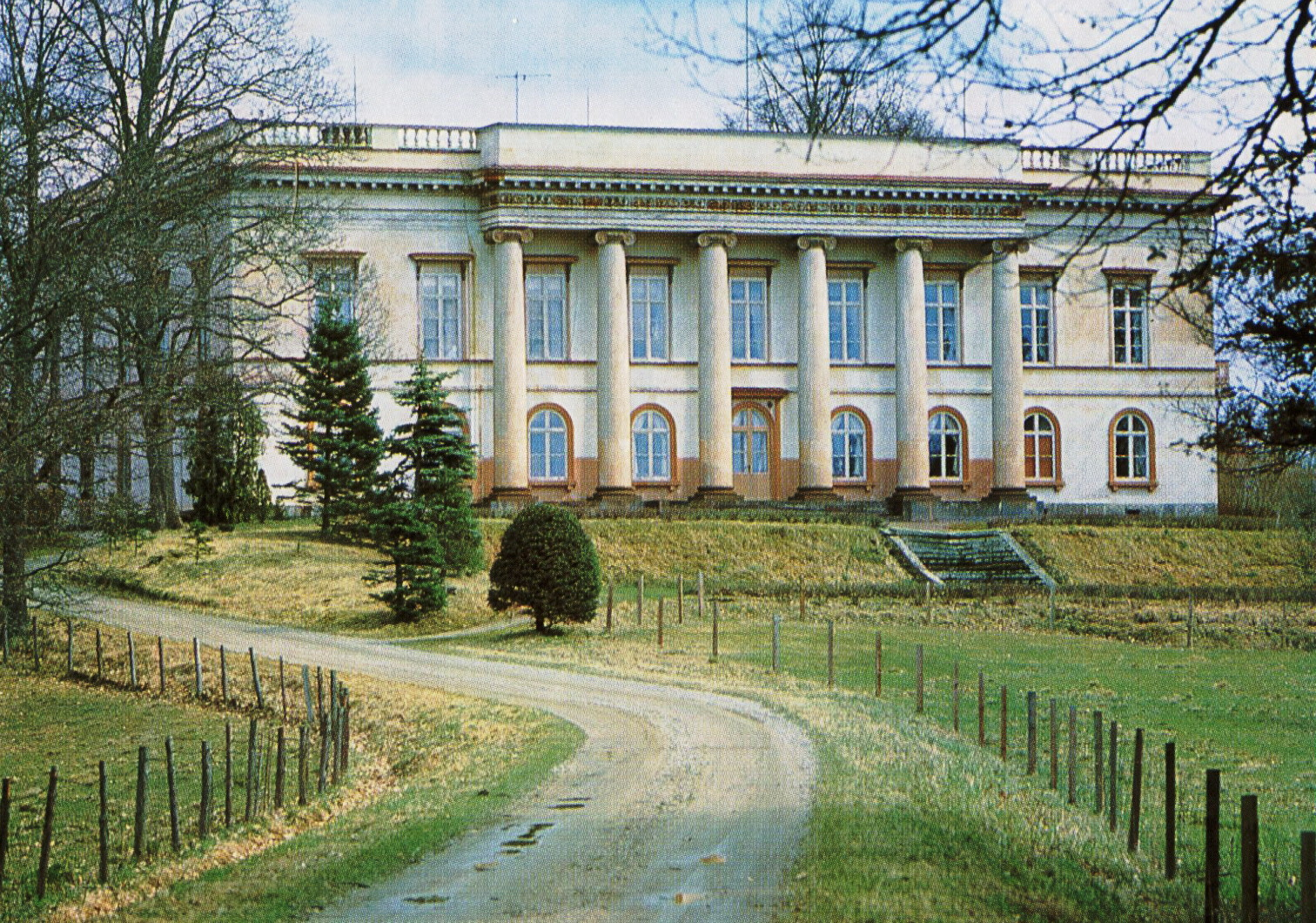
Ekensholm Castle, Södermanland (Sweden)

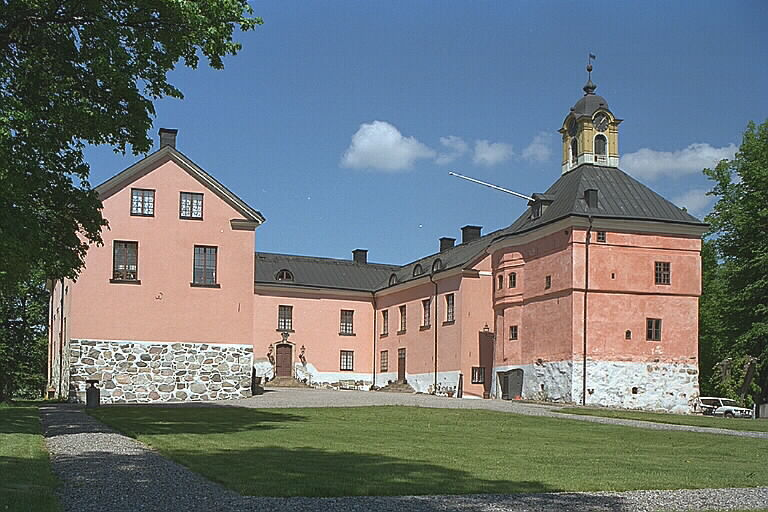
Rydboholm Castle, Uppland (Sweden)

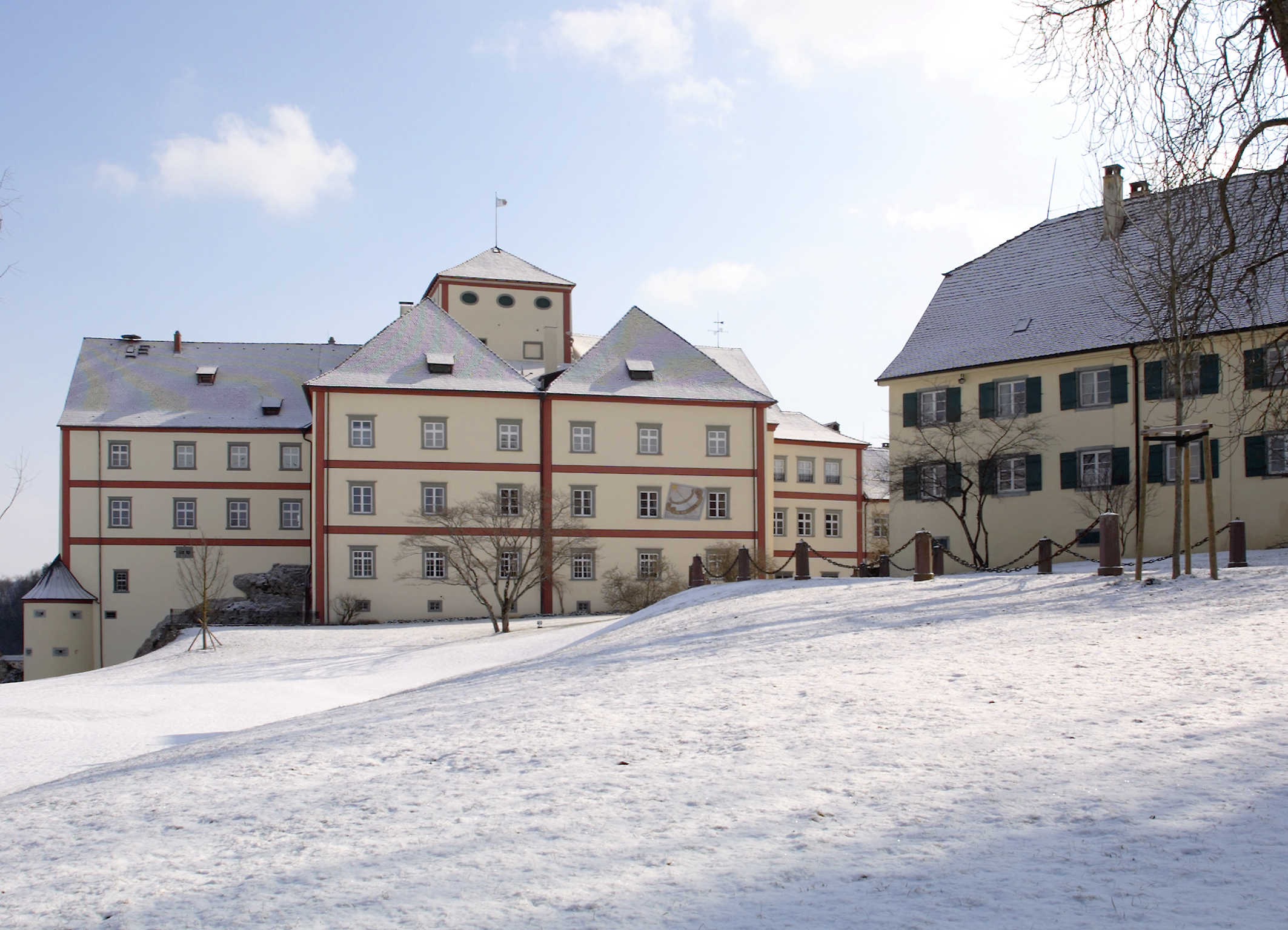
Langenstein Castle, Baden (Germany)

== Chief ==
Alexander Douglas-Hamilton, 16th Duke of Hamilton, and 13th Duke of Brandon is heir to the chiefdom of the house of Douglas, but he cannot assume the title of chief since the Lord Lyon King of Arms requires him to assume the single name Douglas. Note that the Duke of Hamilton is the Chief of Clan Hamilton. For a list of the historic chiefs of Clan Douglas see: Earl of Douglas until 1455 and Earl of Angus for after 1455.

== Douglas castles ==
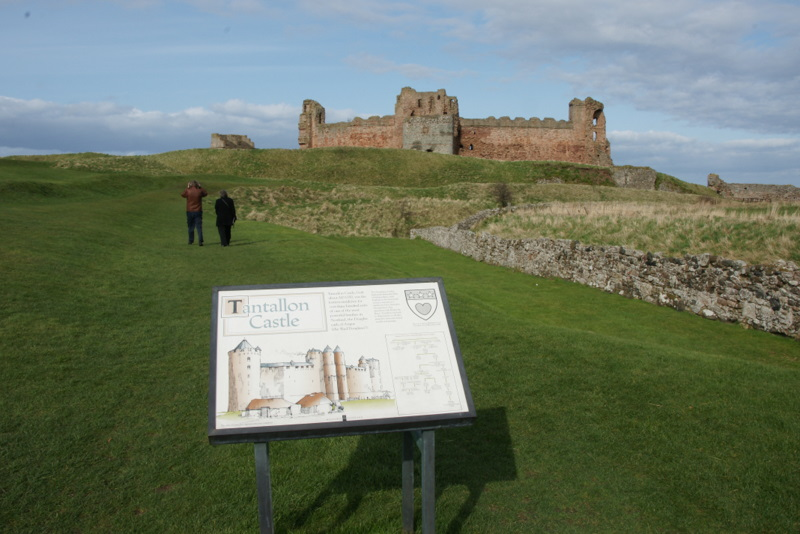
The ruins of Tantallon Castle, a stronghold of the Douglases from 1374 to 1699

- Aberdour Castle, Fife, held by the Earls of Morton (partially preserved)
- Balvenie Castle, Moray, held by James Douglas, 7th Earl of Douglas (ruined)
- Berwick Castle, Northumberland, governed by William "le Hardi" (ruined, now forms part of Berwick-upon-Tweed railway station)
- Bonkyll Castle (Bunkle), Berwickshire
- Bothwell Castle, South Lanarkshire (ruins)
- Bowhill House, Selkirkshire, home of the Duke of Buccleuch and Queensberry (preserved)
- Cranshaws Castle
- Dalkeith Castle, Mid-Lothian (heavily converted)
- Douglas Castle, South Lanarkshire, now only minimal ruins remain
- Drumlanrig Castle, Dumfries and Galloway, 17th-century mansion house of the Dukes of Buccleuch and Queensberry (preserved)
- Grangemuir House, Fife
- Hawthornden Castle, Mid-Lothian
- Hermitage Castle, Roxburghshire, 13th-century Douglas stronghold (restored ruin)
- Kilspindie Castle, East Lothian, home to the Douglases of Kilspindie (scant ruins)
- Langenstein Castle, Germany, to this day home to the Swedish-German branch (Counts Douglas)
- Lennoxlove House, East Lothian, home of the Duke of Hamilton (also the Marquess of Douglas and Clydesdale, Earl of Angus etc.) (preserved)
- Lochleven Castle, Kinross, first home of the Earl of Morton (ruins)
- Lochindorb Castle, Strathspey
- Morton Castle, Nithsdale, Dumfries and Galloway, ruined former home of the Douglas Earls of Morton
- Newark Castle, Selkirkshire
- Neidpath Castle, Peeblesshire
- Ormond Castle, Black Isle
- Roxburgh Castle, captured by Sir James Douglas
- Rydboholm Castle, home to the Swedish branch
- Sandilands Castle, Fife (ruins)
- Stjärnorp Castle, Östergötland, Sweden (partially ruined), home to the Swedish branch
- Strathaven Castle, South Lanarkshire
- Strathendry Castle, Fife
- Tantallon Castle, East Lothian, stronghold of the Red Douglases (partially ruined)
- Threave Castle, Dumfries and Galloway (ruins)
- Timpendean Tower, Roxburghshire (ruins)
- Whittingehame Tower, East Lothian (ruins)
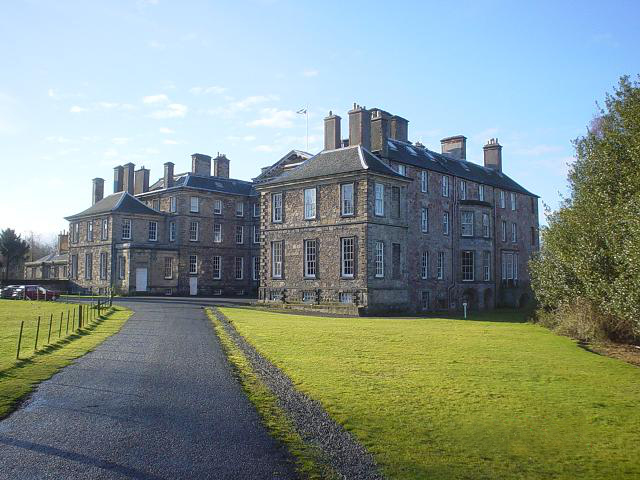
Dalkeith Palace, the former Dalkeith Castle was owned by the clan since 1341 and extended by Regent Morton from 1574

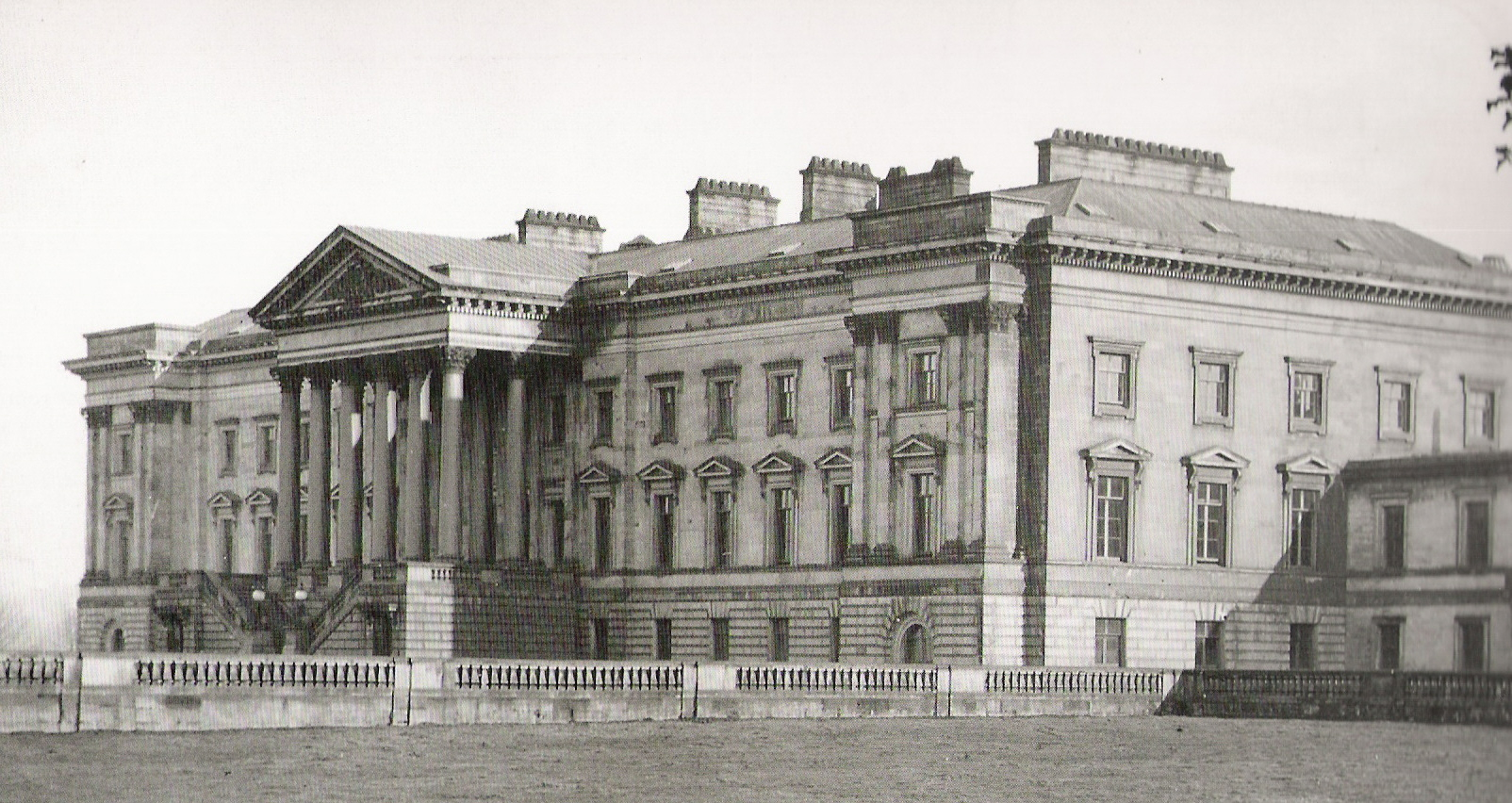
Hamilton Palace (1916, demolished in 1927)

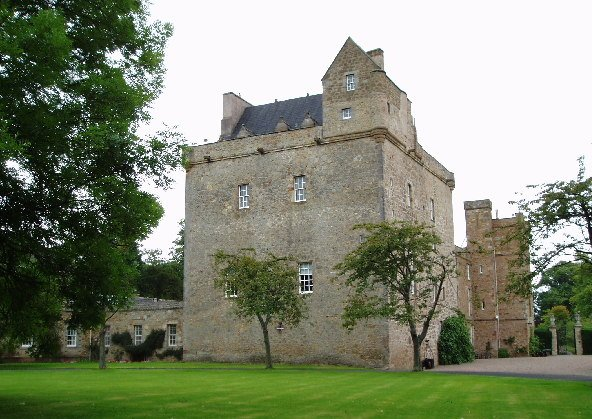
Lennoxlove House, East Lothian, present seat of the Duke of Hamilton

== Titles ==
Peerage of Scotland

- Duke of Hamilton, Marquess of Clydesdale, Earl of Arran and Cambridge, Lord Aven and Innerdale (1643)
- Duke of Hamilton, Marquess of Clydesdale, Earl of Arran, Lanark and Selkirk, Lord Aven, Machanshire, Polmont and Daer (Life Peerage, 1660)
- Duke of Queensberry, Marquess of Dumfriesshire (1684)
- Marquess of Douglas, Earl of Angus, Lord Abernerthy and Jedburgh Forest (1633)
- Marquess of Queensberry, Earl of Drumlanrig and Sanquhar, Viscount Nith, Torthorwald and Ross, Lord Douglas of Kilmount, Middlebie and Dornock (1682)
- Earl of Mar (c. 1114)
- Earl of Wigtown (1341)
- Earl of Douglas (1358)
- Earl of Angus (1389)
- Earl of Avondale (1437)
- Earl of Morton (1458)
- Earl of Queensberry, Viscount of Drumlanrig, Lord Douglas of Hawick and Tibbers (1633)
- Earl of Lanark, Lord Machanshire and Polmont (1639)
- Earl of Arran (1643)
- Earl of Selkirk, Lord Daer and Shortcleugh (1646)
- Earl of Orkney, Viscount of Kirkwall, Lord Dechmont (1696)
- Earl of March, Viscount of Peebles, Lord Douglas of Neidpath, Lyne and Munard (1697)
- Earl of Solway, Viscount Tibbers, Lord Douglas of Lockerby, Dalveen and Thornhill (1706)
- Viscount of Drumlanrig, Lord Douglas of Hawick and Tibbers (1628)
- Viscount of Belhaven (1633)

Peerage of Great Britain

- Duke of Dover, Marquess of Beverley, Baron Ripon (1708)
- Duke of Brandon, Baron Dutton (1711)
- Baron Hamilton of Hameldon (1776)
- Baron Douglas of Lochleven (1791)

Peerage of the United Kingdom

- Baron Solway (1833)
- Baron Penrhyn (1866)
- Baron Kelhead (1893)
- Baron Douglas of Kirtleside (1948)
- Baron Selkirk of Douglas (Life Peerage, 1997)

== Tartans ==
Tartan image	Notes
	Douglas Tartan (modern). The Douglas tartan was worn by the former British Army Regiment, The Cameronians (Scottish Rifles) and is still worn by the Royal Gurkha Rifles. In its grey form, it is worn by the officers of all Scottish squadrons of the RAuxAF as part of their mess uniform.
	Douglas tartan, as published in 1842 in the Vestiarium Scoticum. Whether the Douglasses wore tartan in the sixteenth century, as the Vestiarium asserts, can be questioned.

== Eminent members of the Douglas family ==
Douglases have excelled in many fields, from politics to sports, science to the military, and more. Biographies held on Wikipedia can be found in the lists: 'Douglas (surname) and Douglass (surname)'.

=== Family tree ===
Partial family tree
- William I, Lord of Douglas (died c. 1214)
  - Archibald I, Lord of Douglas
    - William Longleg, Lord of Douglas
      - William the Hardy, Lord of Douglas
        - James Douglas, Lord of Douglas (died 1330), "the Good Sir James"
          - William IV, Lord of Douglas (died 1333)
          - Archibald Douglas, 3rd Earl of Douglas (1328–1400), "the Grim"
            - Archibald Douglas, 4th Earl of Douglas (died 1424), Duke of Touraine
              - Archibald Douglas, 5th Earl of Douglas (died 1439)
                - William Douglas, 6th Earl of Douglas (died 1440)
                - Margaret Douglas, Fair Maid of Galloway
            - James Douglas, 7th Earl of Douglas (1371–1443), "the Gross"
              - William Douglas, 8th Earl of Douglas (1425–1452)
              - James Douglas, 9th Earl of Douglas (1426–1488)
              - Archibald Douglas, Earl of Moray (1426–1455)
              - Hugh Douglas, Earl of Ormonde (died 1455)
              - John Douglas, Lord of Balvenie (died 1463)
            - Sir William Douglas of Nithsdale (died 1391)
        - Hugh the Dull, Lord of Douglas
        - Sir Archibald Douglas (died 1333), Guardian of Scotland
          - William Douglas, 1st Earl of Douglas, married Margaret, Countess of Mar
            - James Douglas, 2nd Earl of Douglas, Earl of Mar (c. 1358–1388)
              - Sir William Douglas of Drumlanrig (died 1421)
                - William Douglas of Drumlanrig (died 1458)
                  - William Douglas of Drumlanrig (died 1464)
                    - Sir William Douglas of Drumlanrig (died 1484)
                      - James Douglas of Drumlanrig (died 1498)
                        - Sir William Douglas of Drumlanrig (died 1513)
                          - Sir James Douglas, 7th of Drumlanrig (died 1578)
                            - Sir William Douglas of Hawick (died 1572)
                              - Sir James Douglas of Drumlanrig (died 1615)
                                - William Douglas, 1st Earl of Queensberry (died 1640)
                                  - James Douglas, 2nd Earl of Queensberry (died 1671)
                                    - William Douglas, 1st Duke of Queensberry (1637–1695)
                                      - James Douglas, 2nd Duke of Queensberry (1662–1711)
                                        - James Douglas, 3rd Marquess of Queensberry (1697–1715)
                                        - Charles Douglas, 3rd Duke of Queensberry (1698–1778), married Catherine Douglas, Duchess of Queensberry (1701–1777)
                                          - Henry Douglas, Earl of Drumlanrig (1722–1754)
                                        - Jane Scott, Countess of Dalkeith (1701–1759)
                                          - Francis Scott, Earl of Dalkeith (1721–1750)
                                            - Henry Scott, 3rd Duke of Buccleuch, 5th Duke of Queensberry (1746–1812)
                                              - Charles Montagu-Scott, 4th Duke of Buccleuch, 6th Duke of Queensberry (1772–1819)
                                                - Walter Montagu Douglas Scott, 5th Duke of Buccleuch, 7th Duke of Queensberry (1806–1884), married Charlotte Montagu Douglas Scott, Duchess of Buccleuch (1811–1895)
                                                  - William Montagu Douglas Scott, 6th Duke of Buccleuch, 8th Duke of Queensberry (1831–1914), married Louisa Montagu Douglas Scott, Duchess of Buccleuch (1836–1912)
                                                    - John Montagu Douglas Scott, 7th Duke of Buccleuch, 9th Duke of Queensberry (1864–1935)
                                                      - Walter Montagu Douglas Scott, 8th Duke of Buccleuch, 10th Duke of Queensberry (1894–1973), married Mary Montagu Douglas Scott, Duchess of Buccleuch (1900–1993)
                                                        - Elizabeth Percy, Duchess of Northumberland (1922–2012)
                                                        - John Scott, 9th Duke of Buccleuch, 11th Duke of Queensberry (1923–2007), married Jane Scott, Duchess of Buccleuch (1929–2011)
                                                          - Richard Scott, 10th Duke of Buccleuch, 12th Duke of Queensberry (born 1954), married Elizabeth Scott, Duchess of Buccleuch (1954–2023)
                                                            - Walter Scott, Earl of Dalkeith (born 1984)
                                                      - Lord William Montagu-Douglas-Scott (1896–1958)
                                                      - Princess Alice, Duchess of Gloucester (1901–2004)
                                                    - Lord George Montagu-Douglas-Scott (1866–1947)
                                                    - Lord Henry Montagu-Douglas-Scott (1868–1945)
                                                    - Lord Herbert Montagu-Douglas-Scott (1872–1944)
                                                      - Andrew Montagu Douglas Scott (1906–1971)
                                                      - Marian Montagu Douglas Scott (1908–1996), grandmother of Sarah Ferguson
                                                    - Lord Francis Montagu-Douglas-Scott (1879–1952)
                                                  - Henry Douglas-Scott-Montagu, 1st Baron Montagu of Beaulieu (1832–1905)
                                                    - John Douglas-Scott-Montagu, 2nd Baron Montagu of Beaulieu (1866–1929)
                                                      - Elizabeth Varley (1909–2002)
                                                      - Edward Douglas-Scott-Montagu, 3rd Baron Montagu of Beaulieu (1926–2013), married Belinda Douglas-Scott-Montagu, Baroness Montagu of Beaulieu (born 1932)
                                                        - Ralph Douglas-Scott-Montagu, 4th Baron Montagu of Beaulieu (born 1961)
                                                        - Mary Montagu-Scott (born 1964)
                                                  - Lord Charles Montagu Douglas Scott (1839–1911)
                                                - Lord John Douglas-Montagu-Scott (1809–1860)
                                      - William Douglas, 1st Earl of March (died 1705)
                                        - William Douglas, 2nd Earl of March (died 1731)
                                          - William Douglas, 4th Duke of Queensberry, 3rd Earl of March (1725–1810)
                                      - Lady Anne Douglas (died 1700), married David Wemyss, 4th Earl of Wemyss
                                        - James Wemyss, 5th Earl of Wemyss (1699–1756)
                                          - Francis Wemyss-Charteris (1723–1808)
                                            - Francis Charteris, Lord Elcho (1749–1808)
                                              - Francis Douglas, 8th Earl of Wemyss, 4th Earl of March (1772–1853)
                                    - James Douglas (1645–1691)
                                  - Sir William Douglas of Kelhead (died 1673)
                                    - Sir James Douglas, 1st Baronet (1639–c. 1707)
                                      - Sir William Douglas, 2nd Baronet (died 1733)
                                        - Sir John Douglas, 3rd Baronet (died 1778)
                                          - Sir William Douglas, 4th Baronet (died 1783)
                                            - Charles Douglas, 6th Marquess of Queensberry (1777–1837)
                                            - John Douglas, 7th Marquess of Queensberry (1779–1856)
                                              - Archibald Douglas, 8th Marquess of Queensberry (1818–1858), married Caroline Douglas (1821–1904)
                                                - John Douglas, 9th Marquess of Queensberry (1844–1900)
                                                  - Francis Douglas, Viscount Drumlanrig, 1st Baron Kelhead (1867–1894)
                                                  - Percy Douglas, 10th Marquess of Queensberry (1868–1920)
                                                    - Francis Douglas, 11th Marquess of Queensberry (1896–1954), married Cathleen Mann
                                                      - David Douglas, 12th Marquess of Queensberry (born 1929)
                                                  - Lord Alfred Douglas (1870–1945), "Bosie"; married Olive Custance
                                                - Lord Francis Douglas (1847–1865)
                                                - Lord Archibald Edward Douglas (1850–1938)
                                                - Lady Florence Dixie (1855–1905)
                                            - Henry Alexander Douglas (1781–1837)
                                              - Henry Alexander Douglas (1821–1875), Bishop of Bombay
                                              - John Douglas (1828–1904)
                                            - Lord William Douglas (1785–1859)
                                              - Walter Douglas Irvine of Grangemuir (1825–1901)
                                                - Helen Douglas Irvine (1880–1946)
                                          - Charles James Sholto Douglas
                                            - James Sholto Douglas (1757–1830)
                                              - Sir James Dawes Douglas (1785–1862)
                                                - Sir John Douglas (1836–1885)
                                            - Stair Douglas (1764–1826)
                                        - David Douglas
                                          - John Erskine Douglas (died 1847)
                                  - Archibald Douglas of Dornock
                                    - William Douglas of Dornock (died 1715)
                                    - James Douglas
                                      - Thomas Douglas (1660–1717)
                                        - Samuel Douglas
                                          - Samuel Douglas
                                            - Robert Douglas
                                              - Samuel Douglas
                                                - Robert Douglas (1836–1912)
                                                  - Robert Langton Douglas (1864–1951)
                                                    - Sholto Douglas, 1st Baron Douglas of Kirtleside (1893–1969)
                                                    - Claire Douglas (born 1933), married J. D. Salinger
                              - Sir James Douglas of Mouswald
                                - James Douglas of Mouswald (died 1655)
                            - Robert Douglas (died 1609), Provost of Lincluden
              - Archibald Douglas of Cavers
                - William Douglas of Cavers
                  - Sir Archibald Douglas of Cavers
                    - Sir William Douglas of Cavers
                      - Sir James Douglas of Cavers
                        - Sir James Douglas of Cavers
                          - Sir William Douglas of Cavers
                            - Sir James Douglas of Cavers (died 1612)
                              - Sir William Douglas, 9th of Cavers
                                - Sir Archibald Douglas, 10th of Cavers
                                  - Sir William Douglas, 11th of Cavers (died 1676)
                                    - Sir William Douglas, 12th of Cavers (died 1698)
                                    - Archibald Douglas, 13th of Cavers (died 1741)
                                      - William Douglas, 14th of Cavers (died 1748)
                        - William Douglas of Friarshaw (died 1575)
                          - George Douglas of Friarshaw
                            - Andrew Douglas of Friarshaw
                              - Andrew Douglas of Friarshaw
                                - Henry Douglas of Friarshaw (died 1701)
                                  - George Douglas of Friarshaw (1673–1753)
                                    - Sir James Douglas, 1st Baronet (1703–1787)
                                      - Sir George Douglas, 2nd Baronet (1754–1821)
                                        - Sir John James Scott-Douglas, 3rd Baronet (1792–1836)
                                          - Sir George Henry Scott-Douglas, 4th Baronet (1825–1885)
                                            - Sir George Brisbane Douglas, 5th Baronet (1856–1935)
                                            - Francis John Scott-Douglas (1858–1934)
                                              - George Francis Valentine Scott-Douglas (1898–1930)
                                                - Sir James Scott Douglas, 5th Baronet (1930–1969)
                                    - Robert Douglas (1727–1809)
                                      - Mary Douglas, married Caspar van Breugel
                                        - Robert van Breugel Douglas (1791–1873)
                                  - James Douglas (1674–1757)
                                    - James Douglas (died 1751)
            - Isabel Douglas, Countess of Mar (died 1408)
            - George Douglas, 1st Earl of Angus (1380–1403), son of Margaret Stewart, Countess of Angus
              - William Douglas, 2nd Earl of Angus (1398–1437)
                - James Douglas, 3rd Earl of Angus (1426–1446)
                - George Douglas, 4th Earl of Angus (died 1463)
                  - Archibald Douglas, 5th Earl of Angus (died 1513), "Bell the Cat"
                    - George Douglas, Master of Angus (1469–1513)
                      - Archibald Douglas, 6th Earl of Angus (died 1557), married Margaret Tudor
                        - Margaret Douglas, Countess of Lennox (1515–1578), grandmother of King James VI and I
                        - George Douglas (died 1589), Bishop of Moray
                      - George Douglas of Pittendreich (died 1552)
                        - David Douglas, 7th Earl of Angus (died 1558)
                          - Archibald Douglas, 8th Earl of Angus, 5th Earl of Morton (1555–1588)
                          - Margaret Douglas, Countess of Bothwell (died 1640)
                        - James Douglas, 4th Earl of Morton (died 1581), Regent of Scotland
                          - Sir James Douglas of Spott (died 1614)
                          - Archibald Douglas of Tofts (died 1621)
                        - George Douglas of Parkhead (died 1602)
                    - Sir William Douglas of Glenbervie (died 1513)
                      - Sir Archibald Douglas of Glenbervie (1513–1570)
                        - William Douglas, 9th Earl of Angus (1533–1591)
                          - William Douglas, 10th Earl of Angus (1552–1611)
                            - William Douglas, 1st Marquess of Douglas (1589–1660)
                              - Archibald Douglas, 1st Earl of Ormond (1609–1655)
                                - James Douglas, 2nd Marquess of Douglas (died 1700)
                                  - James Douglas, Earl of Angus (1671–1692)
                                  - Archibald Douglas, 1st Duke of Douglas (1694–1761)
                                  - Lady Jane Douglas (1698–1753), married John Stewart of Grantully
                                    - Archibald Douglas, 1st Baron Douglas (1748–1827), litigant in the Douglas Cause; married Frances Douglas, Lady Douglas (1750–1817)
                                      - Archibald Douglas, 2nd Baron Douglas (1773–1844)
                                      - Charles Douglas, 3rd Baron Douglas (1775–1848)
                                      - Jane Margaret Douglas (1779–1859), married Henry Scott-Montagu, 2nd Baron Montagu of Boughton
                                        - Lucy Elizabeth Montagu (1805–1877), heiress of Douglas Castle; married Cospatrick Douglas-Home, 11th Earl of Home, 1st Baron Douglas (1799–1881)
                                          - Charles Douglas-Home, 12th Earl of Home, 2nd Baron Douglas (1834–1918)
                                            - Charles Douglas-Home, 13th Earl of Home, 3rd Baron Douglas (1873–1951)
                                              - Sir Alec Douglas-Home (1903–1995), 14th Earl of Home, 4th Baron Douglas (disclaimed); Prime Minister and Foreign Secretary; married Elizabeth Douglas-Home (1909–1990)
                                                - David Douglas-Home, 15th Earl of Home, 5th Baron Douglas (born 1943)
                                              - Henry Montagu Douglas-Home (1907–1980)
                                                - Charles Douglas-Home (1937–1985), journalist
                                              - William Douglas Home (1912–1992), married Rachel Douglas-Home, 27th Baroness Dacre (1929–2012)
                                                - James Thomas Archibald Douglas-Home, 28th Baron Dacre (1952–2014)
                                                  - Emily Beamish, 29th Baroness Dacre (born 1983)
                                      - Caroline Lucy Scott (1784–1857)
                                      - James Douglas, 4th Baron Douglas (1787–1857)
                                - Archibald Douglas, 1st Earl of Forfar (1653–1712)
                                  - Archibald Douglas, 2nd Earl of Forfar (1692–1715)
                              - William Hamilton, Duke of Hamilton, 1st Earl of Selkirk (1634–1694), married Anne Hamilton, 3rd Duchess of Hamilton
                                - James Hamilton, 4th Duke of Hamilton (1658–1712)
                                  - James Hamilton, 5th Duke of Hamilton (1703–1743), married Anne Hamilton, Duchess of Hamilton (1720–1771)
                                    - James Hamilton, 6th Duke of Hamilton (1724–1758), married Elizabeth Hamilton, 1st Baroness Hamilton of Hameldon (1733–1790)
                                      - Elizabeth Smith-Stanley, Countess of Derby (1753–1797)
                                      - James Hamilton, 7th Duke of Hamilton, 4th Marquess of Douglas (1755–1769)
                                      - Douglas Hamilton, 8th Duke of Hamilton, 5th Marquess of Douglas (1756–1799), married Elizabeth Hamilton, Duchess of Hamilton (1757–1837)
                                    - Archibald Hamilton, 9th Duke of Hamilton, 6th Marquess of Douglas (1740–1819)
                                      - Alexander Hamilton, 10th Duke of Hamilton, 7th Marquess of Douglas (1767–1852), married Susan Hamilton, Duchess of Hamilton (1786–1859)
                                        - William Hamilton, 11th Duke of Hamilton, 8th Marquess of Douglas (1811–1863), married Princess Marie Amelie of Baden (1817–1888)
                                          - William Douglas-Hamilton, 12th Duke of Hamilton, 9th Marquess of Douglas (1845–1895)
                                          - Charles George Hamilton, 7th Earl of Selkirk (1847–1886)
                                          - Lady Mary Victoria Douglas-Hamilton (1850–1922)
                                  - Lord William Hamilton (died 1734)
                                  - Lord Anne Hamilton (1709–1748)
                                    - Charles Powell Hamilton (1747–1825)
                                      - Augustus Barrington Price Anne Powell Douglas-Hamilton (1781–1849)
                                        - Charles Henry Douglas-Hamilton (1808–1873)
                                          - Alfred Douglas-Hamilton, 13th Duke of Hamilton, 10th Marquess of Douglas (1862–1940), married Nina Douglas-Hamilton, Duchess of Hamilton (1878–1951)
                                            - Douglas Douglas-Hamilton, 14th Duke of Hamilton, 11th Marquess of Douglas (1903–1973), married Elizabeth Douglas-Hamilton, Duchess of Hamilton (1916–2008)
                                              - Angus Douglas-Hamilton, 15th Duke of Hamilton, 12th Marquess of Douglas (1938–2010)
                                                - Alexander Douglas-Hamilton, 16th Duke of Hamilton, 13th Marquess of Douglas (born 1978)
                                              - James Douglas-Hamilton, Baron Selkirk of Douglas (born 1942), 11th Earl of Selkirk (disclaimed)
                                            - George Douglas-Hamilton, 10th Earl of Selkirk (1906–1994), married Audrey Sale-Barker (1903–1994)
                                            - Lord Malcolm Douglas-Hamilton (1909–1964), married Lady Malcolm Douglas-Hamilton (1909–2013)
                                            - Lord David Douglas-Hamilton (1912–1944), married Prunella Stack (1914–2010)
                                              - Iain Douglas-Hamilton (born 1942)
                                                - Saba Douglas-Hamilton (born 1970)
                                        - Frederic Douglas-Hamilton (1815–1887)
                                          - Frederick Robert Vere Douglas-Hamilton (1843–1917)
                                - Charles Hamilton, 2nd Earl of Selkirk (1663–1739)
                                - John Hamilton, 1st Earl of Ruglen, 3rd Earl of Selkirk (1664–1744)
                                  - Anne Hamilton, 2nd Countess of Ruglen (1698–1748)
                                - George Hamilton, 1st Earl of Orkney (1666–1737)
                                  - Anne O'Brien, 2nd Countess of Orkney (1696–1756)
                                - Lord Basil Hamilton (1671–1701)
                                  - Basil Hamilton of Baldoon (1696–1742)
                                    - Dunbar Douglas, 4th Earl of Selkirk (1722–1799)
                                      - Thomas Douglas, 5th Earl of Selkirk (1771–1820)
                                        - Dunbar Douglas, 6th Earl of Selkirk (1809–1885)
                                - Lord Archibald Hamilton (1673–1754)
                              - George Douglas, 1st Earl of Dumbarton (1635–1692)
                                - George Douglas, 2nd Earl of Dumbarton (1687–1749)
                            - James Douglas, 1st Lord Mordington (died 1656)
                              - William Douglas, 2nd Lord Mordington
                                - James Douglas, 3rd Lord Mordington (born 1651)
                                  - George Douglas, 4th Lord Mordington (died 1741)
                                    - Charles Douglas, 5th Lord Mordington
                          - Sir Robert Douglas of Glenbervie
                            - Sir William Douglas, 1st Baronet
                              - Sir Robert Douglas, 2nd Baronet (died 1692)
                            - George Douglas of Ardit
                              - William Douglas of Ardit (died 1666)
                                - Sir Robert Douglas, 4th Baronet (died 1748)
                                  - Sir William Douglas, 5th Baronet (died 1764)
                                  - Sir Robert Douglas, 6th Baronet (1694–1770)
                                    - Sir Alexander Douglas, 7th Baronet (1738–1812)
                                    - Janet Douglas, married Kenneth Mackenzie
                                      - Sir Kenneth Douglas, 1st Baronet (1754–1833)
                                        - Sir Robert Andrews Douglas, 2nd Baronet (1807–1843)
                                          - Sir Robert Andrews Mackenzie Douglas, 3rd Baronet (1837–1884)
                                          - Kenneth Douglas (1842–1882)
                                            - Sir Kenneth Douglas, 4th Baronet (1868–1954)
                                        - Donald Mackenzie Douglas (1821–1883)
                                          - Donald Sholto Mackenzie Douglas (1849–1928)
                                            - Sir Sholto Courtenay Mackenzie Douglas, 5th Baronet (1890–1986)
                        - James Douglas of Nether Kinmonth
                          - Robert Douglas of Nether Kinmonth
                            - Robert Douglas (1625–1716), Bishop of Brechin and Dunblane
                              - Sylvester Douglas of Whiterigs (died 1729)
                                - John Douglas of Fechel (died 1762)
                                  - Sylvester Douglas, 1st Baron Glenbervie (1743–1823), married Catherine Douglas, Baroness Glenbervie (1760–1817)
                                    - Frederick Sylvester North Douglas (1791–1819)
                              - William Douglas
                                - Robert Douglas of Brigton
                                  - William Douglas of Brigton (died 1814)
                                    - Sir William Douglas of Balgillo (died 1818)
                    - Gavin Douglas (died 1522), Bishop of Dunkeld
                    - Sir Archibald Douglas of Kilspindie, "Greysteil"; married Isobel Hoppar
                      - Archibald Douglas of Kilspindie (died 1580)
                      - Alexander Douglas
                - William Douglas of Cluny
    - Andrew Douglas of Hermiston
      - William Douglas of Hermiston
        - Sir James Douglas of Lothian
          - Sir William Douglas, Lord of Liddesdale (died 1353), "the Flower of Chivalry"
          - Sir John Douglas
            - Sir James Douglas of Dalkeith (died 1420), married Agnes Dunbar
              - James Douglas, 1st Lord Dalkeith (died c. 1441)
                - James Douglas, 2nd Lord Dalkeith (died c. 1456)
                  - James Douglas, 1st Earl of Morton (1426–1493), married Joan Stewart, Countess of Morton
                    - John Douglas, 2nd Earl of Morton (died 1513)
                      - James Douglas, 3rd Earl of Morton (died 1548)
                - Sir William Douglas of Whittingehame
                  - William Douglas of Whittingehame
                    - William Douglas of Whittingehame
                      - William Douglas of Whittingehame (died 1595)
                        - Sir Archibald Douglas of Whittingehame (died 1631)
                        - Patrick Douglas of Standingstone
                          - Robert Douglas, Count of Skenninge (1611–1662)
                            - Gustaf Douglas (1648–1705)
                              - Vilhelm Douglas (1683–1763)
                                - Vilhelm Otto Douglas (1721–1776)
                                  - Carl Vilhelm Douglas (1754–1816)
                                    - Vilhelm Christoffer Robert Douglas (1784–1844)
                                      - Carl Israel Wilhelm Douglas (1824–1898)
                                        - Wilhelm Ludwig Karl Douglas (1849–1908)
                                        - Ludvig Douglas (1849–1916)
                                          - Robert Douglas (1880–1955), married Augusta Victoria of Hohenzollern
                                            - Ludwig Friedrich Morton Douglas (1909–1979)
                                              - Christoph Archibald Ludwig Friedrich Douglas (1948–2016)
                                          - Archibald Douglas (1883–1960)
                                            - Carl Douglas (1908–1961)
                                              - Gustaf Douglas (1938–2023), married Elisabeth Douglas (born 1941)
                                                - Carl Douglas (born 1965)
                                                - Eric Douglas (born 1968)
                                              - Princess Elisabeth, Duchess in Bavaria (1940–2026)
                                              - Rosita Spencer-Churchill, Duchess of Marlborough (born 1943)
                                            - Archibald Douglas (1910–1992)
                                              - Archibald Douglas (born 1949), married Walburga Habsburg Douglas (born 1958)
                                          - Carl Douglas (1888–1946)
                              - Gustaf Otto Douglas (1687–1771)
                        - William Douglas of Stoneypath (died 1642)
                      - Richard Douglas
                    - Archibald Douglas, Parson of Douglas, married Jean Hepburn (died 1599)
            - Sir Henry Douglas of Lugton
              - Sir William Douglas of Lochleven
                - Sir Henry Douglas of Lochleven
                  - Robert Douglas of Lochleven (died 1513)
                    - Sir Robert Douglas of Lochleven
                      - Thomas Douglas
                        - Sir Robert Douglas of Lochleven (died 1547), married Margaret Erskine
                          - William Douglas, 6th Earl of Morton (died 1606)
                            - Robert Douglas, Master of Morton (died 1585)
                              - William Douglas, 7th Earl of Morton (1582–1648)
                                - Robert Douglas, 8th Earl of Morton (died 1649)
                                  - William Douglas, 9th Earl of Morton (died 1681)
                                - James Douglas, 10th Earl of Morton (died 1686)
                                  - James Douglas, 11th Earl of Morton (died 1715)
                                  - Robert Douglas, 12th Earl of Morton (died 1730)
                                  - George Douglas, 13th Earl of Morton (1662–1738)
                                    - James Douglas, 14th Earl of Morton (1702–1768)
                                      - Sholto Douglas, 15th Earl of Morton (died 1774)
                                        - George Douglas, 16th Earl of Morton (1761–1827)
                                        - Hamilton Douglas Halyburton (1763–1783)
                                      - John Douglas (1756–1818)
                                        - George Douglas, 17th Earl of Morton (1789–1858)
                                          - Sholto John Douglas, 18th Earl of Morton (1818–1884)
                                            - Sholto Douglas, 19th Earl of Morton (1844–1935)
                                              - Sholto Charles Douglas, Lord Aberdour (1878–1911)
                                                - Sholto Charles John Hay Douglas, 20th Earl of Morton (1907–1976)
                                              - Charles William Sholto Douglas (1881–1960)
                                                - John Douglas, 21st Earl of Morton (1927–2016)
                                                  - Stewart Douglas, 22nd Earl of Morton (born 1952)
                                          - Arthur Gascoigne Douglas (1827–1905), Bishop of Aberdeen and Orkney
                                        - Edward Douglas-Pennant, 1st Baron Penrhyn (1800–1886)
                                          - George Douglas-Pennant, 2nd Baron Penrhyn (1836–1907)
                                            - Edward Douglas-Pennant, 3rd Baron Penrhyn (1864–1927)
                                              - Alan George Sholto Douglas-Pennant (1890–1914)
                                              - Hugh Douglas-Pennant, 4th Baron Penrhyn (1894–1949)
                                            - Violet Douglas-Pennant (1869–1945)
                                          - Archibald Charles Henry Douglas-Pennant (1837–1884)
                                            - Frank Douglas-Pennant, 5th Baron Penrhyn (1865–1967)
                                              - Sir Cyril Douglas-Pennant (1894–1961)
                                              - Malcolm Douglas-Pennant, 6th Baron Penrhyn (1908–2003)
                                              - Nigel Douglas-Pennant (1909–2000)
                                                - Simon Douglas-Pennant, 7th Baron Penrhyn (born 1938)
                                            - Muriel FitzRoy, 1st Viscountess Daventry (1869–1962)
                                    - Robert Douglas of St Olla (died 1745)
                                - Archibald Douglas of Keillor
                                  - Archibald Douglas
                                    - Sir William Douglas of Kirkness
                                      - William Douglas of Kirkness
                                        - Sir Robert Douglas of Kirkness
                                          - William Douglas of Kirkness (1688–1747)
                                        - William Douglas of Kinglassie
                                          - Charles Douglas of Kinglassie
                                            - Sir Charles Douglas, 1st Baronet (1727–1789)
                                              - Sir William Henry Douglas, 2nd Baronet (1763–1809)
                                              - Sir Howard Douglas, 3rd Baronet (1776–1861)
                                                - Sir Robert Percy Douglas, 4th Baronet (1805–1891)
                                                  - Sir Arthur Percy Douglas, 5th Baronet (1845–1913)
                                                  - Sir James Stewart Douglas, 6th Baronet (1859–1940)
                            - Agnes Douglas, Countess of Argyll (1574–1607)
                            - Elizabeth Douglas, Countess of Erroll (died 1631)
                          - Robert Douglas (died 1580), married Christina Stewart, 4th Countess of Buchan
                            - James Douglas, 5th Earl of Buchan (died 1601)
                              - Mary Douglas, 6th Countess of Buchan (died 1628)
                  - David Douglas of Tilquhillie
                    - James Douglas of Tilquhillie
                      - Arthur Douglas of Tilquhillie
                        - John Douglas of Tilquhillie
                          - John Douglas of Tilquhillie
                            - James Douglas of Inchmarlo
                              - John Douglas of Tilquhillie (died 1723)
                                - John Douglas of Tilquhillie (died 1749)
                                  - John Douglas of Tilquhillie (1708–1791)
                                    - John Douglas of Tilquhillie (1738–1773)
                                      - John Douglas of Tilquhillie (1772–1812)
                                        - John Douglas of Tilquhillie (1804–1870)
                                          - John Sholto Douglas of Tilquhillie (1838–1874)
                                            - Norman Douglas (1868–1952)
                              - Archibald Douglas
                                - Archibald Douglas (died 1743)
                                  - John Douglas (1721–1807), Bishop of Carlisle and Salisbury
                                    - William Douglas (1768–1819)
                                      - William Douglas (1806– )
                                        - Sir Charles Whittingham Horsley Douglas (1850–1914)
              - Nicholas Douglas of Mains
                - James Douglas
                  - James Douglas
                    - William Douglas
                      - John Douglas
                        - Alexander Douglas
                          - Matthew Douglas
                            - Malcolm Douglas of Mains (died 1584)
                              - Robert Douglas, 1st Viscount of Belhaven (1573–1639)
                      - Robert Douglas
                        - Walter Douglas
                          - Malcolm Douglas
                            - Walter Douglas
                              - John Douglas of Mains
                                - Mary Douglas, married John Campbell of Woodside
                                  - James Douglas of Mains
                                    - John Douglas of Mains
                                      - Robert Douglas
                                        - Colin Douglas of Mains (died 1820)
                                          - Archibald Campbell of Blythswood (died 1868)
                                            - Archibald Campbell, 1st Baron Blythswood (1835–1908)
                                            - Sholto Campbell, 2nd Baron Blythswood (1839–1916)
                                            - Barrington Campbell, 3rd Baron Blythswood (1845–1918)
                                              - Archibald Douglas, 4th Baron Blythswood (1870–1929)
  - Bricius de Douglas (died 1222), Bishop of Moray

== Popular culture ==
Samuel Rutherford Crockett's 1899 novel The Black Douglas featured the "Black Dinner". In the Highlander novel Scotland the Brave, James Douglas is a fictional Scot born into Clan Douglas, who died his First Death in 1746 at the Battle of Culloden. The Black Dinner served as inspiration for the events of the Red Wedding depicted in A Storm of Swords, the third book of George R. R. Martin's A Song of Ice and Fire series. Material based on the Red Wedding was included in the episode "The Rains of Castamere" of the HBO drama Game of Thrones which aired on 2 June 2013 in the United States.

== See also ==
- Earl of Home

== Sources ==
- Anderson, William (1878). The Scottish Nation Or the Surnames, Families, Literature, Honours and Biographical History of The People of Scotland. Vol. 3. 13 Blair Street, Edinburgh and 45 Ludgate Hill, London: A. Fullarton & Co. pp. 42-60.
- Barrow, G. W. S (1973). The Kingdom of the Scots: Government, Church and Society from the eleventh to the fourteenth century. New York City: St. Martin's Press.
- Black, George Fraser. The Surnames of Scotland.
- Brown, Michael. The Black Douglases.
- Coventry, Martin (2001). The Castles of Scotland (3rd ed.). Musselburgh: Goblinshead.
- Coventry, Martin (2008). Castles of the Clans: The Strongholds and Seats of 750 Scottish Families and Clans. Musselburgh: Goblinshead. ISBN 978-1-899874-36-1.
- Fraser, William (1885). The Douglas Book.
- Maxwell, Herbert (1902). A History of the House of Douglas from the Earliest Times Down to the Legislative Union of England and Scotland. Vol. 1. 217 Piccadilly, London: Freemantle & Co. ISBN 9781145804951.
- Maxwell, Herbert (1902). A History of the House of Douglas from the Earliest Times Down to the Legislative Union of England and Scotland. Vol. 2. 217 Piccadilly, London: Freemantle & Co.
- Riksantikvarieämbetet (2015). RAÄ-nummer Stjärnorp 14:1.
- Stewart, Donald; Thompson, J Charles (1980). Scotland's Forged Tartans, An analytical study of the Vestiarium Scoticum. Edinburgh: Paul Harris Publishing. ISBN 0-904505-67-7.
- Way, George of Plean; Squire, Romilly of Rubislaw (1994). Collins Scottish Clan & Family Encyclopedia. Glasgow: HarperCollins (for the Standing Council of Scottish Chiefs). ISBN 0-00-470547-5.
