= Walburga Habsburg Douglas =

German-born Swedish lawyer and politician (born 1958)

Archduchess Walburga
- Countess Archibald Douglas
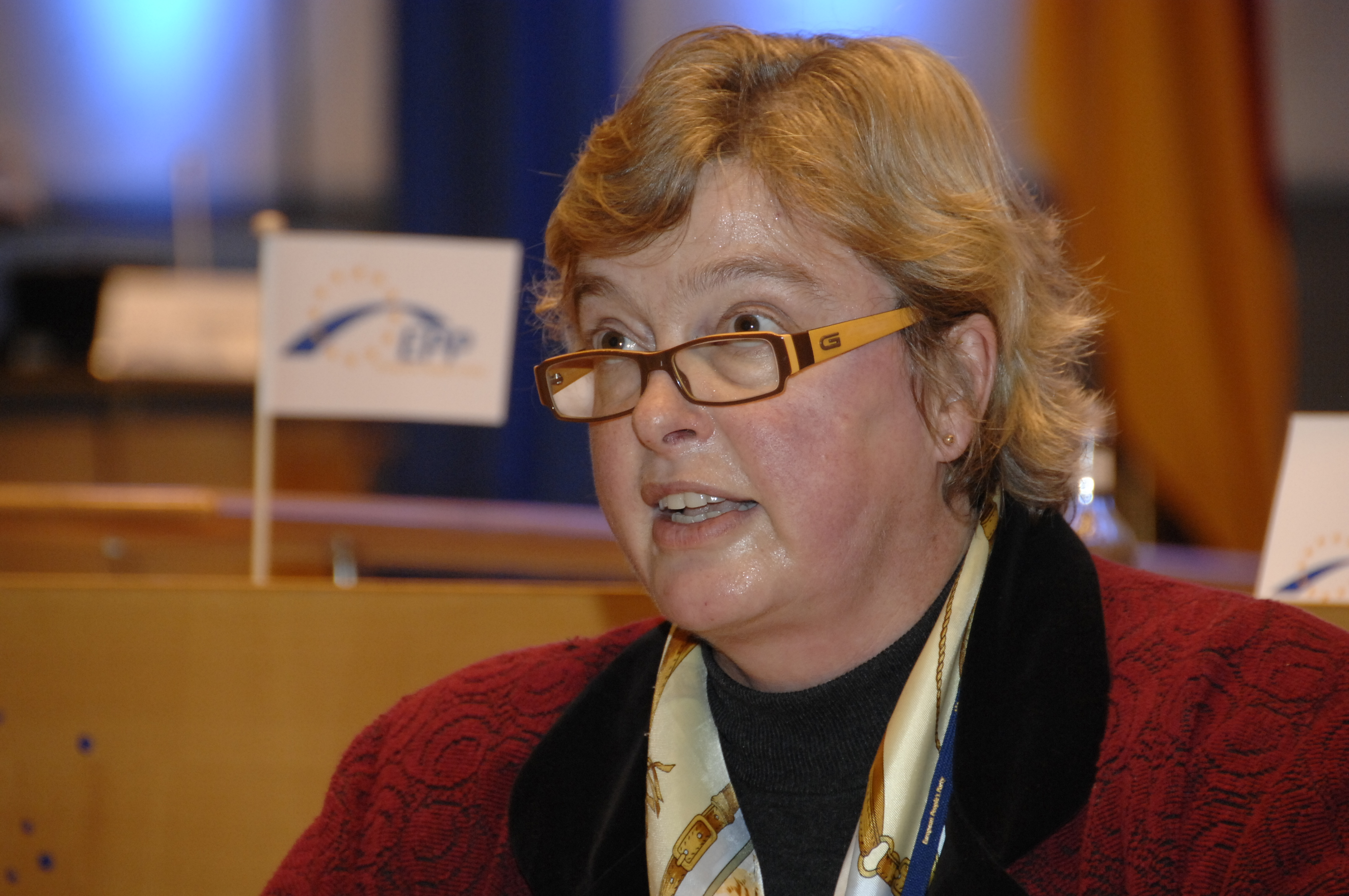
- Pictured in 2009
- Born: Walburga Maria Franziska Helene Elisabeth von Habsburg-Lothringen; 5 October 1958 (age 67); Berg am Starnberger See, West Germany
- Spouse: Count Archibald Douglas (m. 1992)
- Issue: Count Mauritz Douglas
- Father: Otto von Habsburg
- Mother: Regina Prinzessin von Sachsen-Meiningen

Countess Walburga Douglas (née von Habsburg-Lothringen; born 5 October 1958) is a German-born Swedish lawyer and politician, who served as a member of the Riksdag of Sweden for the Moderate Party from 2006 to 2014. She is the vice-president of the Paneuropean Union and a board member of the Institute for Information on the Crimes of Communism.

== Early life ==
At the Gothenburg Book Fair, 2011

Born in 1958 in Berg am Starnberger See, West Germany, she is the fifth daughter of Otto von Habsburg, the last crown prince of Austria-Hungary, and his wife Princess Regina of Saxe-Meiningen. She was baptized under the given names Walburga Maria Franziska Helene Elisabeth.

At the time of her birth, her father was stateless and domiciled in Germany on a Spanish diplomatic passport. Walburga was banished from the Republic of Austria from birth and well into adult life, along with her siblings, by the Habsburg Law that had been in effect since 1938, having been (re)imposed by the Nazis. The Austrian Republic was forced to repeal the banishment of Walburga and her family, which was found to violate their human rights, as a precondition for admission to the European Union.

She is a granddaughter of the last Austrian emperor, Charles I, and a member of the House of Habsburg-Lorraine. Her ancestral titles (abolished in Austria since 1919) are Archduchess Walburga of Austria, Archduchess of Austria, Princess of Hungary and Bohemia, with the style of Her Imperial and Royal Highness (HI&RH). Her family used the traditional titles as titles of pretense during their exile in Germany when she was a child. She does not currently use her ancestral titles actively in her daily life; however, by law she holds the title of Countess Douglas in the Kingdom of Sweden, her current country of residence and citizenship.

== Career ==
=== Professional career ===
After her Abitur graduation in 1977 in Tutzing, Bavaria, she studied canonical law to the doctoral level in Salzburg. From 1979 to 1992 she worked as an assistant at the European Parliament. In 1983 she studied at the National Journalism Center in Washington, D.C., and worked at the office of Reader's Digest in the same city. She worked for the Ministry of Information of the Sultanate of Oman from 1985 to 1992, and in 2004 she became a member of the board of the Arab International Media Forum in London.

=== Political career ===
In 1973 she co-founded Paneuropa-Jugend Deutschland, and was its chairperson in Bavaria, and vice chairperson on the national level. In 1977 she founded Brüsewitz-Zentrum (Christlich-Paneuropäisches Studienwerk). From 1980 to 1988 she was assistant international Secretary General of the international Paneuropean Union, 1988 to 2004 she was its secretary general and she is its executive vice chairperson since 2004.

She was one of the organisers of the Paneuropa-Picknick at the Iron Curtain on 19 August 1989, on the border between Hungary and Austria. At this occasion, the fence was opened for the first time, letting more than 660 Germans from the GDR escape from the east. This was the largest number of escapees since the Berlin Wall was built and is seen by many as one of the main symbols of the fall of Eastern European Communism.

Since 2003 she is the chairperson of the local branch of the Swedish Moderate Party in Flen and on the board of the regional organisation of the party in Södermanland. She is a member of the board of the Jarl Hjalmarson Foundation since 2005, a foundation closely linked to the Moderate Party.

In 1999 and 2004 she ran for the European Parliament for the Moderate Party, in 2002 and 2006 she ran for the national parliament (Riksdag). She was elected 17 September 2006 to the Swedish Parliament, in an election which showed the greatest support for the Moderate Party since 1928. Vice-president of the OSCE Parliamentary Assembly and Head of the Swedish Parliamentary delegation to the OSCE since 2011. She had to give up her seat in the Riksdag in 2014 due to the heavy losses of her party, after eight years as a member of parliament.

She is a board member of the Institute for Information on the Crimes of Communism.

On 17 September 2023, Douglas visited Armenia to dedicate the opening of the PanEuropa Armenia branch in Yerevan.

== Personal life ==
On 5 December 1992 in Budapest, Hungary, Walburga married a Swedish nobleman, Count Carl Axel Archibald Douglas (born 27 November 1949 in Stockholm), son of Count Archibald Douglas and Baroness Margareta Lagerfelt. Her husband's family is a noble family in Sweden, descended from the Scot Robert Douglas, Count of Skenninge, member of the Scottish Clan Douglas and founder of its Swedish branch. The family's comital title, conferred by Queen Christina of Sweden in 1654, is legally recognized in the country. Her husband is a first cousin of Count Gustaf Douglas and his sisters Rosita Spencer-Churchill, Duchess of Marlborough, and Princess Elisabeth, Duchess in Bavaria, the wife of Prince Max, Duke in Bavaria. The later is the mother of Sophie, Hereditary Princess of Liechtenstein, née Duchess in Bavaria. All those were also second cousins to Richard, 6th Prince of Sayn-Wittgenstein-Berleburg, the late husband of Princess Benedikte of Denmark.

They have a son, Count Mauritz Otto Wenzel Douglas (born 30 March 1994 in Stockholm). They live at Ekensholm Castle in Sweden.

== Honours ==
- House of Habsburg-Lorraine: Dame of the Imperial and Royal Order of the Starry Cross, 1st Class
- : Dame of Honour and Devotion of the Sovereign Military Order of Malta
