= Ekensholm Castle =

- Flen Municipality, Sweden
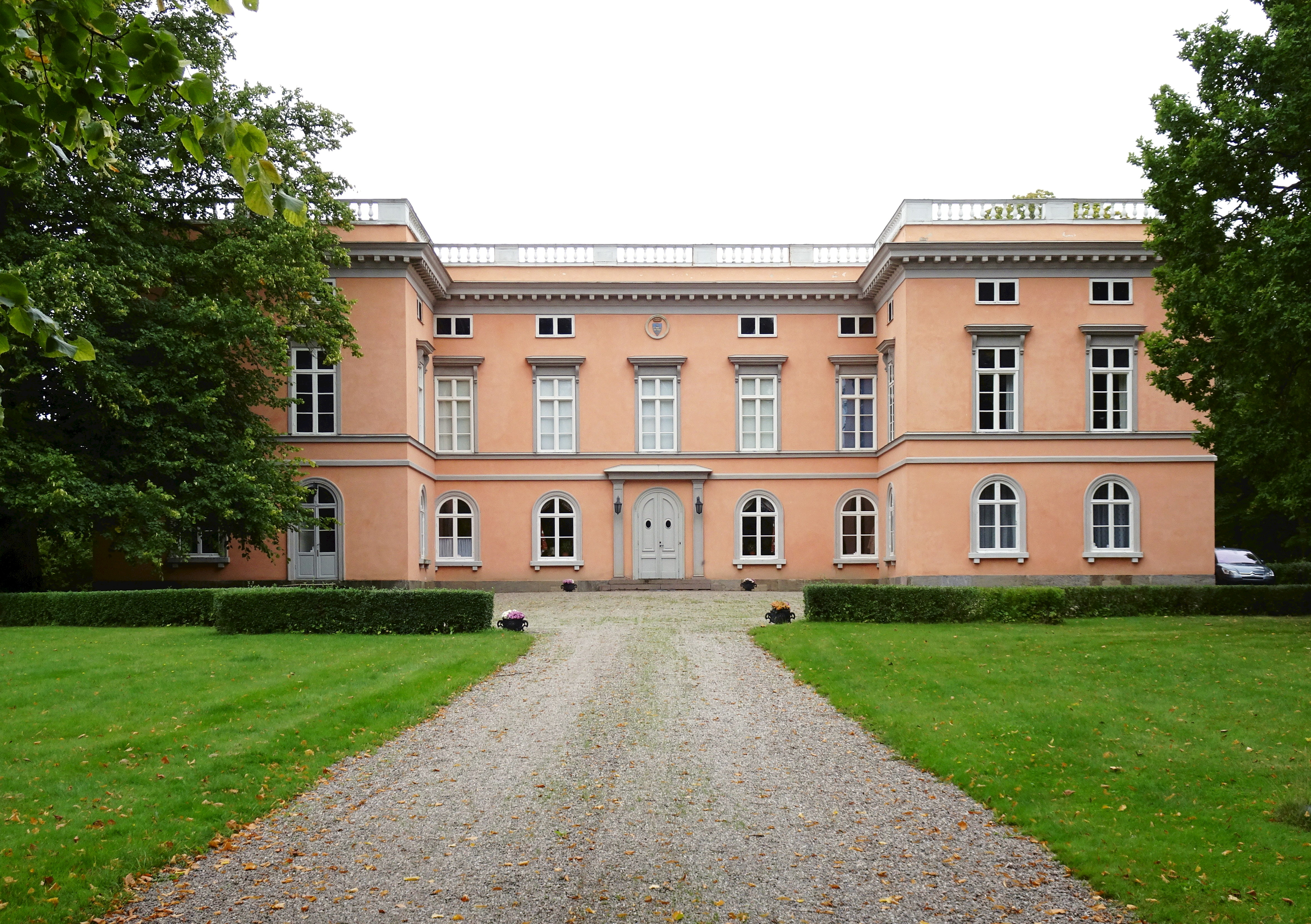

Site information
- Type: Castle
- Website: ekensholm.se

Location
- Coordinates: 59°09′44″N 16°52′34″E

Ekensholm Castle (Swedish: Ekensholms Slott) is a manor house in Sweden. It is located in Flen Municipality (Swedish: Flens Kommun), in Södermanland County. It is most known for being the residence of the Archduchess of Austria. Ekensholm Castle sits on the northern side of Dunkern lake, and is close to the small towns of Dunker and Hässelby. It is located in Dunker Parish. The current version of the manor was built in 1827 for the Swedish lieutenant and politician Baron Knut Kurck, who was briefly suspected of and arrested for the 1792 murder of King Gustav III of Sweden.

Today, the castle is the home of Count Archibald Douglas and his wife, Archduchess Walburga of Austria, Countess Douglas. From 2007 to 2008, the equestrian trainer at the manor trained a horse, Salut, for use by the Swedish Royal Guard.

== See also ==
- List of castles in Sweden
