= Langenstein Castle =

Coordinates: 47°50′34″N 8°54′10″E

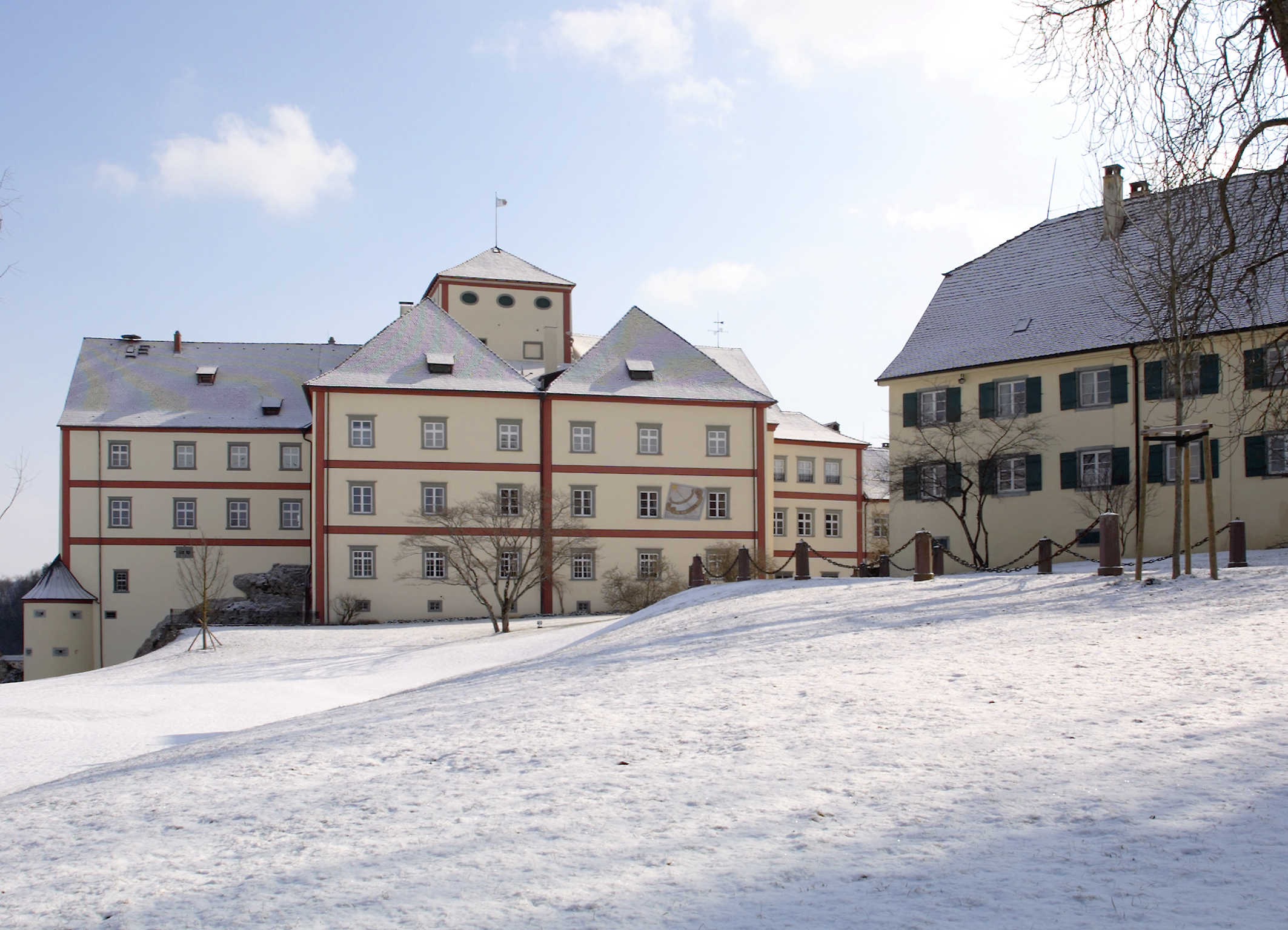
Langenstein Castle

Langenstein Castle is a Renaissance building of the sixteenth century. Today it is owned by the Douglases, descendants of the Swedish count Ludvig Douglas. It is located within the territory of Orsingen-Nenzingen, a municipality in the Hegau region near lake Constance in southern Germany. The castle is widely known for its golf course. The palace also houses a Carnival Museum.

In 2014, Count Axel Douglas (b. 1943) sold the castle and all its lands to his cousin, Count Christoph Douglas (1948-2016). His son and heir, Count Leopold Douglas (b. 1989), member of the Swedish-German branch of Clan Douglas and his family live in the castle today.
