= Frederick Robert Vere Douglas-Hamilton =

British engineer

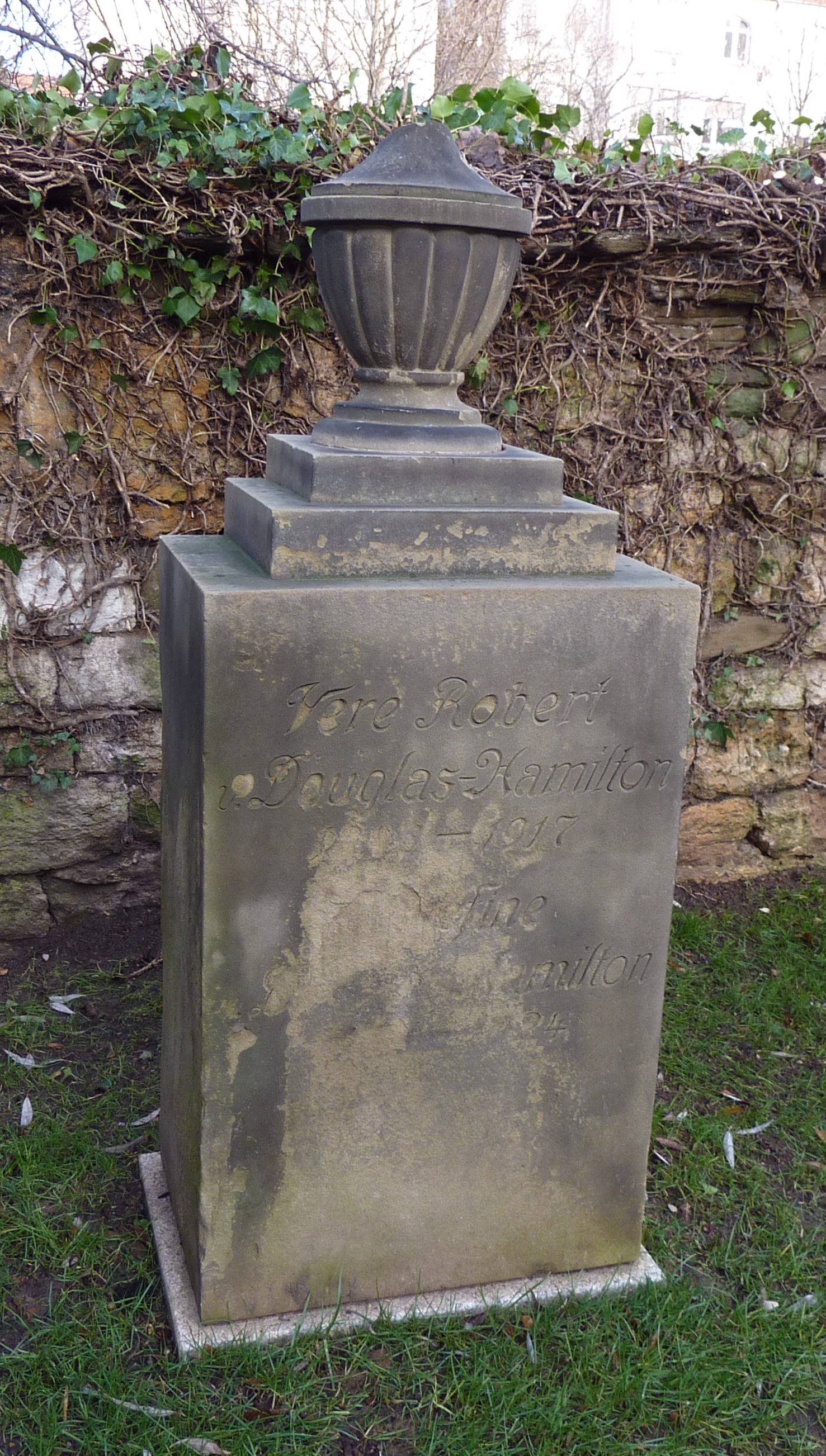
Tomb of Frederick Robert Vere Douglas-Hamilton

Frederick Robert Vere Douglas-Hamilton (1843–1917) was an engineer of Scottish ancestry. He was descended from James Hamilton, 4th Duke of Hamilton.

== Biography ==
He was born in London on 7 December 1843, the eldest son of diplomat Frederic Douglas-Hamilton and Marina (born Norton). He grew up in London and Madeira, and studied mathematics and civil engineering in Karlsruhe. He later worked as a railway engineer on the construction of the Schwarzwaldbahn. In 1873 he married Josefine Baumann, the daughter of an innkeeper in Hornberg. From 1910 until his death he lived in Bad Cannstatt.

== Ancestry ==
- James Hamilton, 4th Duke of Hamilton, 1658–1712
  - Lord Anne Hamilton, 1709–1748
    - Charles Powell Hamilton, 1747–1825
      - Augustus Barrington Price Anne Powell Hamilton, 1781–1849
        - Frederic Douglas-Hamilton, 1815–1887
          - Frederick Robert Vere Douglas-Hamilton

== Death ==
He died at Bad Cannstatt in 1917 and is buried in the Uff-Kirchhof cemetery.
