= John Elliot (Roxburghshire MP) =

British politician (1788–1862)

The Honourable John Edmund Elliot
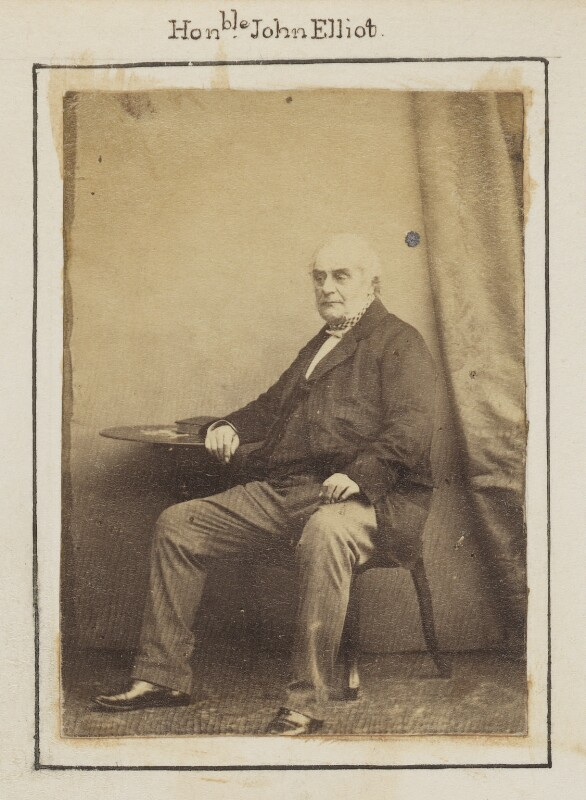
- Elliot in the 1860s

Member of Parliament for Roxburghshire
- In office 1837–1859
- Preceded by: Lord John Douglas-Montagu-Scott
- Succeeded by: Francis Scott

Personal details
- Parent: Gilbert Elliot-Murray-Kynynmound, 1st Earl of Minto

John Edmund Elliot (30 March 1788 – 4 April 1862) was a British Whig politician.

== Background ==
Elliot was the third son of Gilbert Elliot-Murray-Kynynmound, 1st Earl of Minto, and Anna Maria, daughter of Sir George Amyand, 1st Baronet.

== Political career ==
Elliot sat as Member of Parliament for Roxburghshire from 1837 to 1841 and again from 1847 to 1859. He served under Lord John Russell as Joint Secretary to the Board of Control between 1849 and 1852.

== Family ==
Elliot married Amelia, daughter of James Henry Casamaijor, in 1809. They had several children. He died in April 1862, aged 74. His wife survived him by ten years and died in July 1872.

Their children were:

- Edmund James (b. 1813, d. 1854) was married to Matilda Halkett in 1853.
- William Brownrigg (b. 1820, d. 1900) was married to Mary Morton in 1858.
- Amyand Powneg Charles (b. 1842, d. 1869) was married to Anna Maria Alexander in 1842.
- Augustus John (b. 1824, d. 1889) was married to Helene Lewis of Pleam in 1855.
- Amelia Jane (b. 1810, d. 1837) was married to Thomas Campbell Robertson in 1830.
- Anna Maria Elizabeth (b. 1812, d. 1883) was married to Pierce Taylor in 1865.

Parliament of the United Kingdom
| Preceded by Lord John Douglas-Montagu-Scott | Member of Parliament for Roxburghshire; 1837–1841 | Succeeded by Francis Scott |
| Preceded by Francis Scott | Member of Parliament for Roxburghshire; 1847–1859 | Succeeded by Sir William Scott, Bt |
Political offices
| Preceded by Thomas Wyse; James Wilson | Joint Secretary to the Board of Control; 1849–1852; With: James Wilson | Succeeded by Henry Baillie; Charles Lennox Cumming Bruce |
