= Lord John Scott =

Scottish aristocrat & politician (1809-1860)

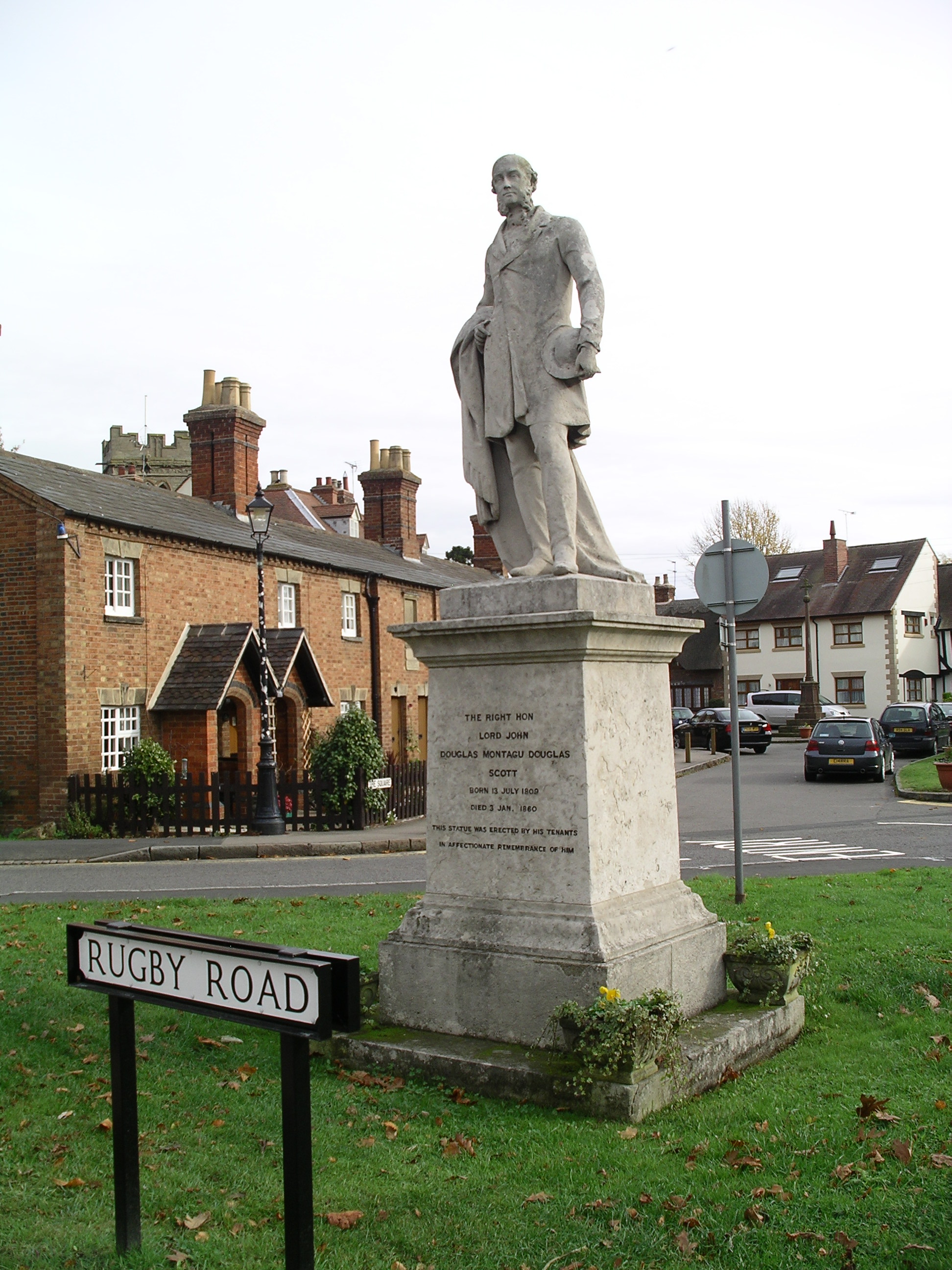
- Statue of Scott. Dunchurch, Warwickshire

Member of Parliament for Roxburghshire
- In office 1832-1835

Personal details
- Born: 13 July 1809 Dalkeith, Scotland
- Died: 3 January 1860 (aged 50) Cawston, Warwickshire
- Party: Whig
- Spouse: Alicia Spottiswoode (m. 1836)
- Parent: Charles Montagu-Scott (father)
- Relatives: Walter Montagu Douglas Scott (brother); Arthur Moore (nephew); Henry Moore (nephew); Henry Scott (grandfather); Elizabeth Montagu (grandmother); Thomas Townshend (grandfather); Elizabeth Powys (grandmother)

Lord John Douglas Montagu Scott (13 July 1809 – 3 January 1860) was a Scottish aristocrat and politician for Roxburghshire. He was born at Dalkeith House, the third son of the 4th Duke of Buccleuch and younger brother to the 5th Duke of Buccleuch. He inherited his residence at Cawston in Warwickshire. In March 1836, he married Alicia Spottiswoode but died childless.

== Election results ==
Scott defeated Royal Navy officer, George Elliot (b.1784). Elliot sat as a Whig Member of Parliament for Roxburghshire from 1832 until his defeat in 1835.

General election 1835: Roxburghshire
Party	Candidate	Votes	%	±%
Conservative	Lord John Scott	757		
Whig	Captain Elliot	681		

== Labrador Retrievers ==
Outside public life Lord John Scott was a keen fisherman, hunter, and yachtsman. In the 1830s, he together with his brother the 5th Duke of Buccleuch and his uncle, the 10th Earl of Home were among the first to import Newfoundland dogs for use as gundogs. These dogs are considered to be the progenitors of modern Labradors.

== Statue ==
A statue of Scott, by Joseph Durham, stands in the centre of Dunchurch, Warwickshire.

At Christmas, it has been an annual tradition for a group of pranksters to secretly dress up the statue in the garb of a cartoon or TV character overnight. They have done this every Christmas for more than 30 years, More recently the statue was dressed up as an Olympian for the final leg of the Olympic torch relay sporting a headband and runners jersey. The statue was dressed up as Queen Elizabeth II during her diamond jubilee weekend celebrations.
