= 1870 Roxburghshire by-election =

UK Parliamentary by-election

The 1870 Roxburghshire by-election was fought on 2 March 1870. The by-election was fought due to the resignation of the incumbent Liberal MP, Sir William Scott. It was won by the unopposed Liberal candidate Marquess of Bowmont.
