= Henry Montagu-Scott, 2nd Baron Montagu of Boughton =

British peer (1776-1845)

The Right Honourable The Lord Montagu of Boughton

Lord Lieutenant of Selkirkshire
- In office 25 August 1823 – 30 October 1845
- Preceded by: The Lord Napier
- Succeeded by: The Lord Polwarth

Personal details
- Born: Henry James Scott; 16 December 1776
- Died: 30 October 1845 (aged 68)
- Children: 4
- Parent(s): Lady Elizabeth Montagu; Henry Scott, 3rd Duke of Buccleuch
- Education: Eton College
- Alma mater: St. John's College, Cambridge

Henry James Montagu-Scott, 2nd Baron Montagu of Boughton (16 December 1776 – 30 October 1845)

== Early life ==
Lord Henry James Scott was born on 16 December 1776. He was the youngest son of Lady Elizabeth Montagu (1743–1827) and Henry Scott, 3rd Duke of Buccleuch. His elder siblings were Lady Elizabeth Scott (wife of Alexander Home, 10th Earl of Home), Lady Mary Scott (wife of James Stopford, 3rd Earl of Courtown), Charles Montagu-Scott, 4th Duke of Buccleuch, Lady Caroline Scott (wife of Charles Douglas, 6th Marquess of Queensberry). His younger sister was Lady Harriet Scott (wife of William Kerr, 6th Marquess of Lothian).

His paternal grandparents were Francis Scott, Earl of Dalkeith (son of Francis Scott, 2nd Duke of Buccleuch) and the former Caroline Campbell. His maternal grandparents were Lady Mary Montagu and George Montagu, 1st Duke of Montagu.

Lord Henry was educated at Eton and St. John's College, Cambridge.

== Career ==
On his maternal grandfather's death in 1790, when the Dukedom of Montagu became extinct, the Barony passed under a special remainder to Lord Henry Scott. Lord Henry also inherited the Lordship of Bowland from his mother, the Duchess, having the title entailed upon him by his nephew, the 5th Duke, in 1827.

In 1823, he was appointed Lord-Lieutenant of Selkirkshire, succeeding Francis Napier, 8th Lord Napier and holding office until his death in 1845.

== Personal life ==
On 22 November 1804, Scott was married to Hon. Jane Margaret Douglas, the daughter of Archibald Douglas, 1st Baron Douglas and, his first wife, Lady Lucy Graham (the daughter of William Graham, 2nd Duke of Montrose and Lady Lucy Manners). Together, they were the parents of four daughters:

- Hon. Lucy Elizabeth Montagu-Scott (1805–1877), who married her first cousin, Cospatrick Home, 11th Earl of Home, son of Alexander Home, 10th Earl of Home and Lady Elizabeth Scott. They were the parents of Charles Douglas-Home, 12th Earl of Home.
- Mary Margaret Montagu-Scott (1807–1885), who married Lt.-Col. Frederick Clinton, son of Lt.-Gen. Sir William Henry Clinton and Hon. Louisa Dorothea Holroyd (a daughter of John Baker-Holroyd, 1st Earl of Sheffield).
- Jane Caroline Montagu-Scott (1808–1846), who died unmarried.
- Hon. Caroline Georgiana Montagu-Scott (1811–1891), who married George William Hope, son of Gen. Sir Alexander Hope (a son of son of John Hope, 2nd Earl of Hopetoun) and Georgiana Brown.

Lord Montagu died on 30 October 1845. Upon his death, and with no male issue, the title of Montagu of Boughton became extinct.

Honorary titles
Preceded by The Lord Napier	Lord Lieutenant of Selkirkshire; 1823–1845	Succeeded by The Lord Polwarth
Peerage of Great Britain
Preceded by George Montagu	Baron Montagu of Boughton; 1790–1845	Extinct
