= Charles Montagu-Scott, 4th Duke of Buccleuch =

English politician and cricketer

His Grace The Duke of Buccleuch and Queensberry KT
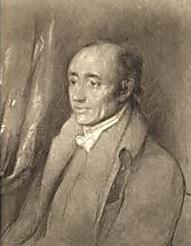
- The Duke of Buccleuch

Personal details
- Born: 24 May 1772 London, England
- Died: 20 April 1819 (aged 46) Lisbon, Portugal
- Party: Tory
- Spouse: Hon. Harriet Townshend (m. 1795; died 1814)
- Children: Lady Anne Montagu Douglas Scott; George Montagu Douglas Scott, Lord Eskdaill; Charlotte Stopford, Viscountess Stopford; Lady Isabella Cust; Lady Katherine Montagu Douglas Scott; Walter Montagu Douglas Scott, 5th Duke of Buccleuch; Lord John Montagu Douglas Scott; Margaret Marsham, Countess of Romney; Lady Harriet Moore
- Parents: Henry Scott, 3rd Duke of Buccleuch; Lady Elizabeth Montagu
- Education: Christ Church, Oxford

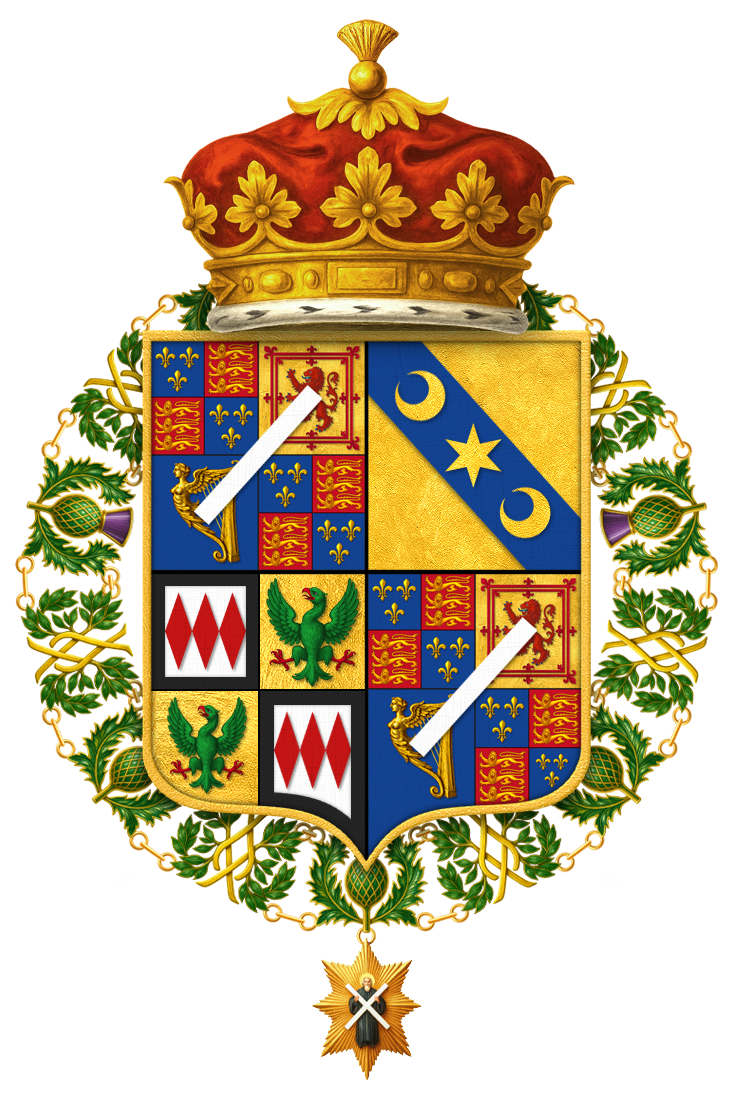
Shield of Arms of Charles William Henry Montagu-Scott, 4th Duke of Buccleuch and 6th Duke of Queensberry, KT

Charles William Henry Montagu-Scott, 4th Duke of Buccleuch and 6th Duke of Queensberry, KT (24 May 1772 – 20 April 1819), styled Earl of Dalkeith until 1812, was a British landowner, amateur cricketer and Tory politician.

== Background and education ==
Styled Earl of Dalkeith from birth, he was born in London, England, the fourth child of seven, and the second son of Henry Scott, 3rd Duke of Buccleuch and Lady Elizabeth Montagu, daughter of George Montagu, 1st Duke of Montagu. Charles was a direct male-line descendant of Charles II of England through his illegitimate son, James Scott. His elder brother George had died when only two months old after receiving a smallpox inoculation. He was educated at Eton and Christ Church, Oxford.

== Cricket career ==
Lord Dalkeith was an amateur cricketer who made four known appearances in important matches in 1797. He was a member of Marylebone Cricket Club (MCC).

== Public life ==
Dalkeith was returned to Parliament for Marlborough in 1793, a seat he held until 1796, and then represented Ludgershall until 1804, Mitchell between 1805 and 1806 and Marlborough again between 1806 and 1807. The latter year he was summoned to the House of Lords through a writ of acceleration in his father's junior title of Baron Scott of Tyndale. He was also Lord-Lieutenant of Selkirkshire between 1794 and 1797, of Dumfriesshire between 1797 and 1819 and of Midlothian between 1812 and 1819. He was appointed a deputy lieutenant of Northamptonshire on 9 May 1803. In 1812 he was made a Knight of the Thistle. He succeeded his father in the dukedom the same year and one of his first acts was to commission what is now the oldest iron bridge in Scotland. Also in 1813 his long-time friend Walter Scott was offered the position of Poet Laureate. Montagu counselled him to retain his literary independence, and the position went to Scott's friend, Robert Southey.

== Family ==
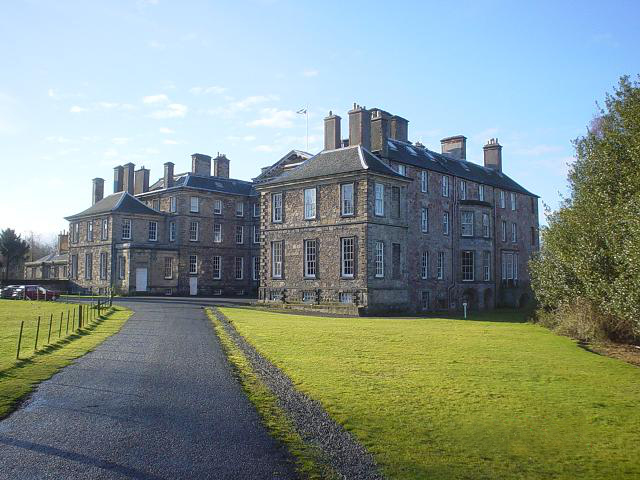
Dalkeith Palace, Midlothian

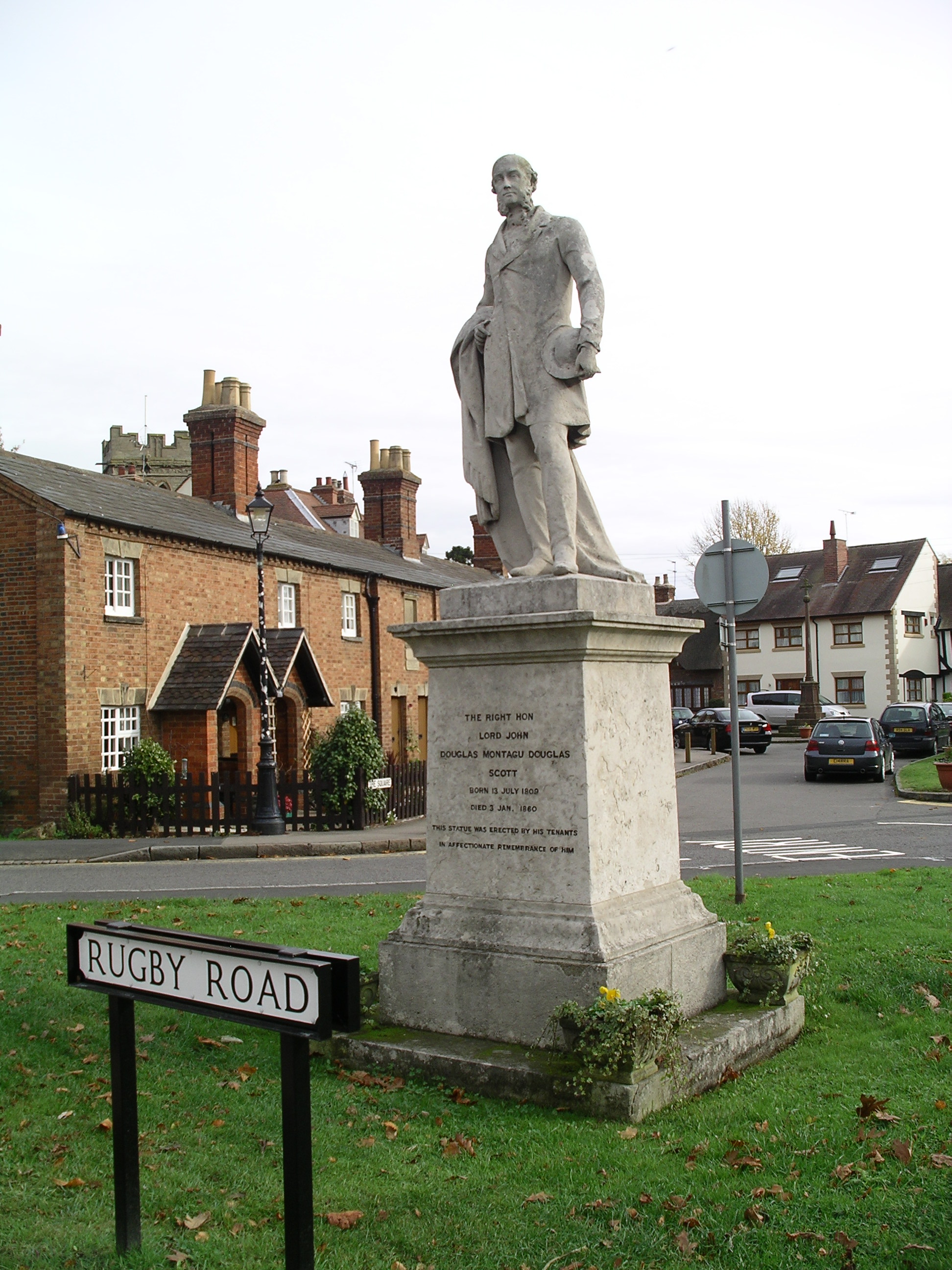
Statue of Lord John Douglas-Montagu-Scott by Joseph Durham

A statue of Scott, by Joseph Durham, stands in the centre of Dunchurch, Warwickshire.

Buccleuch married the Honourable Harriet Katherine Townshend (29 November 1773 – 24 August 1814), daughter of Thomas Townshend, 1st Viscount Sydney, on 24 March 1795. They had nine children:

- Lady Anne Elizabeth Montagu Scott (17 August 1796 – 13 August 1844).
- George Henry Scott, Lord Scott of Whitchester (2 January 1798 – 1 March 1808).
- Lady Charlotte Albinia Montagu Scott (16 July 1799 – 29 February 1828), married James Stopford, 4th Earl of Courtown. They were the parents of Frederick Stopford.
- Lady Isabella Mary Montagu Scott (24 October 1800 – 9 October 1829), married the Honourable Peregrine Francis Cust.
- Lady Katherine Frances Montagu Scott (4 December 1803 – 6 June 1814).
- Walter Francis Montagu Douglas Scott, 5th Duke of Buccleuch and 7th Duke of Queensberry (25 November 1806 – 16 April 1884).
- Lord John Douglas-Montagu-Scott (13 July 1809 – 3 January 1860), MP for Roxburghshire; married Alicia Ann Spottiswoode.
- Lady Margaret Harriet Montagu Scott (12 June 1811 – 5 June 1846), married Charles Marsham, 3rd Earl of Romney. They were the parents of Charles Marsham, 4th Earl of Romney and the cricketer John Marsham.
- Lady Harriet Janet Sarah Scott (13 August 1814 – 16 February 1870), who married the Reverend Edward Moore and was the mother of Admiral Sir Arthur Moore and Henry Moore.

The Duchess of Buccleuch died at Dalkeith House in August 1814, aged 40, and was buried at Warkton, Northamptonshire. Buccleuch died on 20 April 1819, aged 46, at Lisbon, Portugal, from tuberculosis, and was buried at Warkton. Having survived the death of his first-born son in 1808, he was succeeded by his second-born son, the twelve-year-old Walter, Earl of Dalkeith.

Parliament of Great Britain
Preceded by The Earl of Courtown; Thomas Bruce	Member of Parliament for Marlborough with Thomas Bruce; 1793–1796	Succeeded by Lord Bruce; James Bruce
Preceded by William Harbord; Nathaniel Newnham	Member of Parliament for Ludgershall; 1796–1801; With: Thomas Everett	Succeeded by Parliament of the United Kingdom
Parliament of the United Kingdom
Preceded by Parliament of Great Britain	Member of Parliament for Ludgershall; 1801–1804; With: Thomas Everett	Succeeded by Thomas Everett; Magens Dorrien Magens
Preceded by Robert Ainslie; Robert Dallas	Member of Parliament for Mitchell; 1805–1806; With: Robert Ainslie	Succeeded by Sir Christopher Hawkins, Bt; Frederick Trench
Preceded by Lord Bruce; James Henry Leigh	Member of Parliament for Marlborough; 1806–1807; With: Lord Bruce	Succeeded by Lord Bruce; Viscount Stopford
Honorary titles
New office	Lord Lieutenant of Selkirkshire; 1794–1797	Succeeded by The Lord Napier
Preceded by The Duke of Queensberry	Lord Lieutenant of Dumfriesshire; 1797–1819	Succeeded by The Marquess of Queensberry
Preceded by The Duke of Buccleuch	Lord Lieutenant of Midlothian; 1812–1819	Succeeded by The Marquess of Lothian
Masonic offices
Preceded by James Stirling	Grand Master of the Grand Lodge of Scotland; 1800–1802	Succeeded by The Earl of Aboyne
Peerage of Scotland
Preceded by Henry Scott	Duke of Buccleuch; 2nd creation 1812–1819	Succeeded by Walter Montagu Douglas Scott
Preceded by Henry Scott	Duke of Queensberry; 1812–1819	Succeeded by Walter Montagu Douglas Scott
Peerage of England
Preceded by Henry Scott	Baron Scott of Tyndale (writ of acceleration); 1807–1819	Succeeded by Walter Montagu Douglas Scott
