= Henry Hepburne-Scott =

Henry Hepburne-Scott may refer to:

- Henry Hepburne-Scott, 7th Lord Polwarth
- Henry Hepburne-Scott, 10th Lord Polwarth
