= Frittenden =

Village in Kent, England

Coordinates: 51.141430°N 0.593460°E

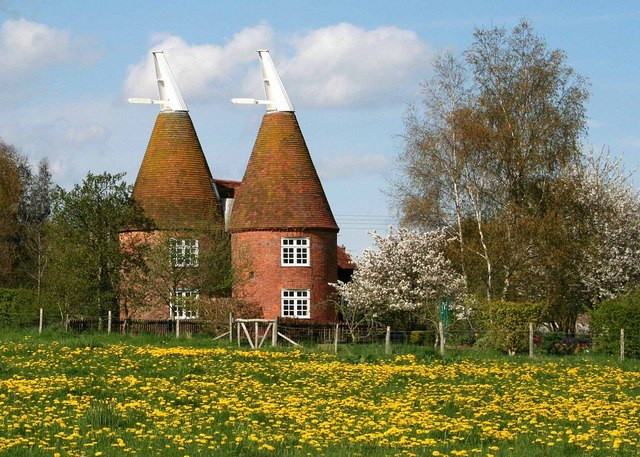
- Street Farm Oast, Frittenden

- Location within Kent
- Population: 888 (2011)
- Civil parish: Frittenden
- District: Tunbridge Wells
- Shire county: Kent
- Region: South East
- Country: England
- Sovereign state: United Kingdom
- Post town: Cranbrook
- Postcode district: TN17
- Police: Kent
- Fire: Kent
- Ambulance: South East Coast
- UK Parliament: Weald of Kent
- Website: Frittenden Parish Council

Frittenden is a village and civil parish in the Tunbridge Wells District of Kent, England. The parish is located on the flood plain of one of the tributaries of the River Medway, 15 miles (24 km) to the east of Tunbridge Wells: the village is three miles (4.8 km) south of Headcorn. It is in a very rural part of Kent. The parish church is dedicated to St Mary.

== History ==
Roman remains have been found near an old Jutish track which ran through the area, along which pigs were driven into the forest of Andreadsweald. The village itself is named in a charter of 804, and the Anglo Saxon Chronicle of 839 relate that King Ethelwulf of Wessex gave the village land to St Augustines in Canterbury.

Thomas Cromwell was given land in the village during the reign of King Henry VIII.

Frittenden Church underwent extensive renovation in 1848 following a fire in the Church in 1790 when lightning struck the Church steeple.

Rumours of the Frittenden Treacle Mines were started by locals in the 1930s at the expense of gullible Londoners who would tour the area in their newly acquired motor cars, eager to visit the source of much of the world's treacle.

Frittenden Historical Society keeps a record of the history of the village and its inhabitants. It meets regularly in the Memorial Hall.

== Notable people ==
The rector of the parish church from 1900 to 1916 was Rupert Edward Inglis who was a former England rugby international. He was killed at the Battle of the Somme in 1916. His letters home to his wife from the front were published by his widow after the war. He is commemorated on the war memorial, and the lychgate at St Mary's church is dedicated to him.

Admiral Sir Arthur Moore (1847–1934), the son of another rector of the parish, Edward Moore, was born at Frittenden in 1847 and was buried in the churchyard.

== See also ==
- Listed buildings in Frittenden
