= Listed buildings in Frittenden =

Civil Parish in Kent, England

Frittenden is a village and civil parish in the Borough of Tunbridge Wells of Kent, England. It contains 66 listed buildings that are recorded in the National Heritage List for England. Of these four are grade II* and 62 are grade II.

This list is based on the information retrieved online from Historic England.

== Key ==
Grade	Criteria
I	Buildings that are of exceptional interest
II*	Particularly important buildings of more than special interest
II	Buildings that are of special interest

== Listing ==
Name	Grade	Location	Type	Completed (Note: The date given is the date used by Historic England as significant for the initial building or that of an important part in the structure's description.)	Date designated	Grid ref. (Note: The grid reference is based on the British national grid reference system, sometimes known as OSGB36, used by the Ordnance Survey.) Geo-coordinates	Notes	Entry number (Note: The "List Entry Number" is a unique number assigned to each listed building and scheduled monument by Historic England.)	Image	Wikidata
Church Cottage	II	TN17 2DD			22 June 1989	TQ8131840900; 51°08′19″N 0°35′26″E		1320028	Upload Photo	Q26606070
Lashenden Farmhouse	II				22 June 1989	TQ8466540898; 51°08′15″N 0°38′18″E		1338648	Upload Photo	Q26622952
Tolehurst Farmhouse	II				20 June 1967	TQ7874240079; 51°07′56″N 0°33′12″E		1116163	Upload Photo	Q26409814
Wall and Outhouse Attached to Church Cottage	II				22 June 1989	TQ8130640914; 51°08′20″N 0°35′25″E		1338679	Upload Photo	Q26622978
Tile Barn House	II	Ayleswade Lane, Headcorn, TN27 9JG			22 June 1989	TQ8430542029; 51°08′52″N 0°38′01″E		1084759	Upload Photo	Q26368993
Barn and Attached Sheds 10 Metres West of Little Bubhurst	II	Bubhurst Lane			22 June 1989	TQ8295941595; 51°08′40″N 0°36′51″E		1084761	Upload Photo	Q26368999
Great Bubhurst	II*	Bubhurst Lane			20 June 1967	TQ8315941712; 51°08′43″N 0°37′02″E		1084760	Upload Photo	Q17547312
Little Bubhurst	II	Bubhurst Lane			22 June 1989	TQ8298441599; 51°08′40″N 0°36′53″E		1338649	Upload Photo	Q26622953
Balcombe Farmhouse	II*	Buckhurst Road			20 June 1967	TQ8207640916; 51°08′19″N 0°36′05″E		1338652	Upload Photo	Q17547728
Bell and Jorrocks Public House	II	Buckhurst Road	pub		22 June 1989	TQ8153941221; 51°08′29″N 0°35′38″E		1338650	Bell and Jorrocks Public House More images	Q26622954
Buckhurst Bridge (located at Tq 836 404)	II	Buckhurst Road			22 June 1989	TQ8355440424; 51°08′01″N 0°37′20″E		1084766	Upload Photo	Q26369029
Corner Farmhouse	II	Buckhurst Road			20 June 1967	TQ8215140866; 51°08′17″N 0°36′08″E		1084767	Upload Photo	Q26369033
Forge House	II	Buckhurst Road			22 June 1989	TQ8155641210; 51°08′29″N 0°35′38″E		1084763	Upload Photo	Q26369010
Frittenden Stores Manchester House	II	Buckhurst Road			22 June 1989	TQ8153541235; 51°08′30″N 0°35′37″E		1084762	Upload Photo	Q26369005
Manor Farmhouse	II	Buckhurst Road			20 June 1988	TQ8166341196; 51°08′28″N 0°35′44″E		1338651	Upload Photo	Q26622955
Oast About 25 Metres North of Stone Court Farmhouse	II	Buckhurst Road			22 June 1989	TQ8308740854; 51°08′16″N 0°36′57″E		1084765	Upload Photo	Q26369022
Oasthouse About 25 Metres North of Weaver's Den	II	Buckhurst Road			22 June 1989	TQ8193240874; 51°08′18″N 0°35′57″E		1116548	Upload Photo	Q26410147
Oasthouse and Barn About 15 Metres South of Manor Farmhouse	II	Buckhurst Road			9 January 1980	TQ8167941172; 51°08′28″N 0°35′45″E		1084764	Upload Photo	Q26369016
Ponds Farmhouse	II*	Buckhurst Road			9 June 1952	TQ8260740909; 51°08′18″N 0°36′32″E		1186236	Upload Photo	Q17547416
Providence Chapel and House	II	Buckhurst Road	chapel		22 June 1989	TQ8173541064; 51°08′24″N 0°35′47″E		1186207	Providence Chapel and House More images	Q26481474
Stone Court Farmhouse	II	Buckhurst Road			20 June 1967	TQ8306640839; 51°08′15″N 0°36′55″E		1186220	Upload Photo	Q26481485
The Mitchells	II	Buckhurst Road			22 June 1989	TQ8212740868; 51°08′17″N 0°36′07″E		1186257	Upload Photo	Q26481515
Townsend Cottages	II	1-3, Buckhurst Road			22 June 1989	TQ8190340854; 51°08′17″N 0°35′56″E		1084769	Upload Photo	Q26369044
Weaver's Den	II	Buckhurst Road			20 June 1967	TQ8192540850; 51°08′17″N 0°35′57″E		1084768	Upload Photo	Q26369039
Charity Cottages	II	Headcorn Road			22 June 1989	TQ8157641289; 51°08′31″N 0°35′40″E		1116521	Upload Photo	Q26410122
Great Hungerden Cottages	II	1 and 2, Headcorn Road			22 June 1989	TQ8186542356; 51°09′06″N 0°35′56″E		1116491	Upload Photo	Q26410094
Little Brookwood	II	Headcorn Road			22 June 1989	TQ8223642245; 51°09′02″N 0°36′15″E		1084770	Upload Photo	Q26369050
Little Brookwood Granary	II	Headcorn Road			12 June 1990	TQ8218242260; 51°09′02″N 0°36′13″E		1084546	Upload Photo	Q26368265
Lychgate and Quadrant Walls, About 40 Metres South Off Church of St Mary	II	About 40 Metres South Off Church Of St Mary, High Street			22 June 1989	TQ8133240900; 51°08′19″N 0°35′26″E		1320048	Upload Photo	Q26606089
Barn and Handpump Attached, About 10 Metres South of Broadlake	II	About 10 Metres South Of Broadlake, Mill Lane			15 February 1988	TQ8044442271; 51°09′04″N 0°34′43″E		1084736	Upload Photo	Q26368872
Broadlake	II	Mill Lane			22 June 1989	TQ8043642290; 51°09′05″N 0°34′43″E		1116329	Upload Photo	Q26409955
Brook Farmhouse	II	Mill Lane			22 June 1989	TQ8096941379; 51°08′35″N 0°35′09″E		1338674	Upload Photo	Q26622973
Cherry Tree Farmhouse	II	Mill Lane			20 June 1967	TQ8075341601; 51°08′42″N 0°34′58″E		1338672	Upload Photo	Q26622971
Cole Farm	II	Mill Lane			20 June 1967	TQ8066541555; 51°08′41″N 0°34′53″E		1084771	Upload Photo	Q26369054
Gould Farmhouse	II	Mill Lane			20 June 1967	TQ8057841519; 51°08′40″N 0°34′49″E		1084734	Upload Photo	Q26368861
Granary/outbuilding About 10 Metres East of Cole Farmhouse	II	Mill Lane			22 June 1989	TQ8068441556; 51°08′41″N 0°34′54″E		1084731	Upload Photo	Q26368846
Limberlost	II	Mill Lane			22 June 1989	TQ8111641328; 51°08′33″N 0°35′16″E		1084733	Upload Photo	Q26368856
Maplehurst Mill House	II	Mill Lane			22 June 1989	TQ8030541704; 51°08′46″N 0°34′35″E		1338675	Upload Photo	Q26622974
Oasthouse About 20 Metres South East of Cherry Tree Farmhouse	II	Mill Lane			22 June 1989	TQ8078041589; 51°08′42″N 0°34′59″E		1084732	Upload Photo	Q26368851
Oasthouse About 75 Metres South West of Cherry Tree Farmhouse	II	Mill Lane			22 June 1989	TQ8073141555; 51°08′41″N 0°34′57″E		1338673	Upload Photo	Q26622972
Rock Farm House	II	Rock Hill			20 June 1967	TQ7913140284; 51°08′02″N 0°33′32″E		1116339	Upload Photo	Q26409964
Beal Farmhouse	II	Sand Lane			22 June 1989	TQ8155340079; 51°07′52″N 0°35′36″E		1338677	Upload Photo	Q26622976
Brissenden Farmhouse	II	Sand Lane			22 June 1989	TQ8151439973; 51°07′49″N 0°35′34″E		1116281	Upload Photo	Q26409914
Catherine Wheel	II	Sand Lane			22 June 1989	TQ8189340350; 51°08′01″N 0°35′54″E		1338676	Upload Photo	Q26622975
Former Barn About 25 Metres North West of Catherine Wheel	II	Sand Lane, TN17 2BA			22 June 1989	TQ8189540371; 51°08′01″N 0°35′54″E		1116309	Upload Photo	Q26409936
Lowland Farm House and Walled Forecourt	II	Sand Lane			22 June 1989	TQ8142039794; 51°07′43″N 0°35′29″E		1084737	Upload Photo	Q26368878
Gatehouse	II	Staplehurst Road			22 June 1989	TQ8131440887; 51°08′19″N 0°35′25″E		1084740	Upload Photo	Q26368893
Lake House	II	Staplehurst Road			22 June 1989	TQ8124042304; 51°09′05″N 0°35′24″E		1116298	Upload Photo	Q26409926
Little Manor	II	Staplehurst Road, TN17 2EA			22 June 1989	TQ8079542234; 51°09′03″N 0°35′01″E		1338678	Upload Photo	Q26622977
Oasthouse About 25 Metres East of Sandhurst Bridge Farmhouse	II	Staplehurst Road			22 June 1989	TQ8137442221; 51°09′02″N 0°35′31″E		1084738	Upload Photo	Q26368884
Poplar House	II	Staplehurst Road			22 June 1989	TQ8093442301; 51°09′05″N 0°35′08″E		1084739	Upload Photo	Q26368887
Sandhurst Bridge Farmhouse	II	Staplehurst Road			20 June 1967	TQ8135042231; 51°09′02″N 0°35′30″E		1320006	Upload Photo	Q26606052
Sinkhurst Green Cottages	II	Staplehurst Road			22 June 1989	TQ8077542241; 51°09′03″N 0°35′00″E		1320025	Upload Photo	Q26606068
Burnt House	II	Tanyard Road			20 December 1988	TQ8006639314; 51°07′29″N 0°34′18″E		1116161	Upload Photo	Q26409812
Foxearth Cottage	II	Tanyard Road			22 June 1989	TQ7979139445; 51°07′34″N 0°34′05″E		1084745	Upload Photo	Q26368919
Park Farm House	II	Tanyard Road			22 June 1989	TQ8025139495; 51°07′35″N 0°34′28″E		1084744	Upload Photo	Q26368913
Church of St Mary	II*	The Street	church building		20 June 1967	TQ8131840953; 51°08′21″N 0°35′26″E		1116253	Church of St Mary More images	Q17547411
Frittenden School	II	The Street			22 June 1989	TQ8139140961; 51°08′21″N 0°35′30″E		1116159	Upload Photo	Q26409810
Monument to Reverend Edward Moore, About 25 Metres South of Church of St Mary	II	About 25 Metres South Of Church Of St Mary, The Street			22 June 1989	TQ8132740921; 51°08′20″N 0°35′26″E		1084741	Upload Photo	Q26368897
Street Farm Cottage Street Farmhouse	II	The Street			22 June 1989	TQ8135340870; 51°08′18″N 0°35′27″E		1338681	Upload Photo	Q26622980
Sundial About 30 Metres South of Church of St Mary	II	The Street			22 June 1989	TQ8132740910; 51°08′19″N 0°35′26″E		1116235	Upload Photo	Q26409875
Three Chest Tombs About 1 to 6 Metres East of Church of St Mary	II	The Street			22 June 1989	TQ8133740951; 51°08′21″N 0°35′27″E		1084742	Upload Photo	Q26368903
Wall and Outhouse Attached to Well House	II	The Street			22 June 1989	TQ8137240928; 51°08′20″N 0°35′28″E		1116217	Upload Photo	Q26409858
Well House	II	The Street			22 June 1989	TQ8135640912; 51°08′20″N 0°35′28″E		1338680	Upload Photo	Q26622979
Well and Housing About 10 Metres East of Well House	II	The Street			22 June 1989	TQ8136540920; 51°08′20″N 0°35′28″E		1084743	Upload Photo	Q26368908

== See also ==
- Grade I listed buildings in Kent
- Grade II* listed buildings in Kent

== Sources ==
- Newman, John (2012) [1969], Kent: West and the Weald, The Buildings of England, New Haven and London: Yale University Press, ISBN 978-0-300-18509-6
