= Grenzlandring =

Coordinates: 51°8′26.5″N 6°17′16.5″E

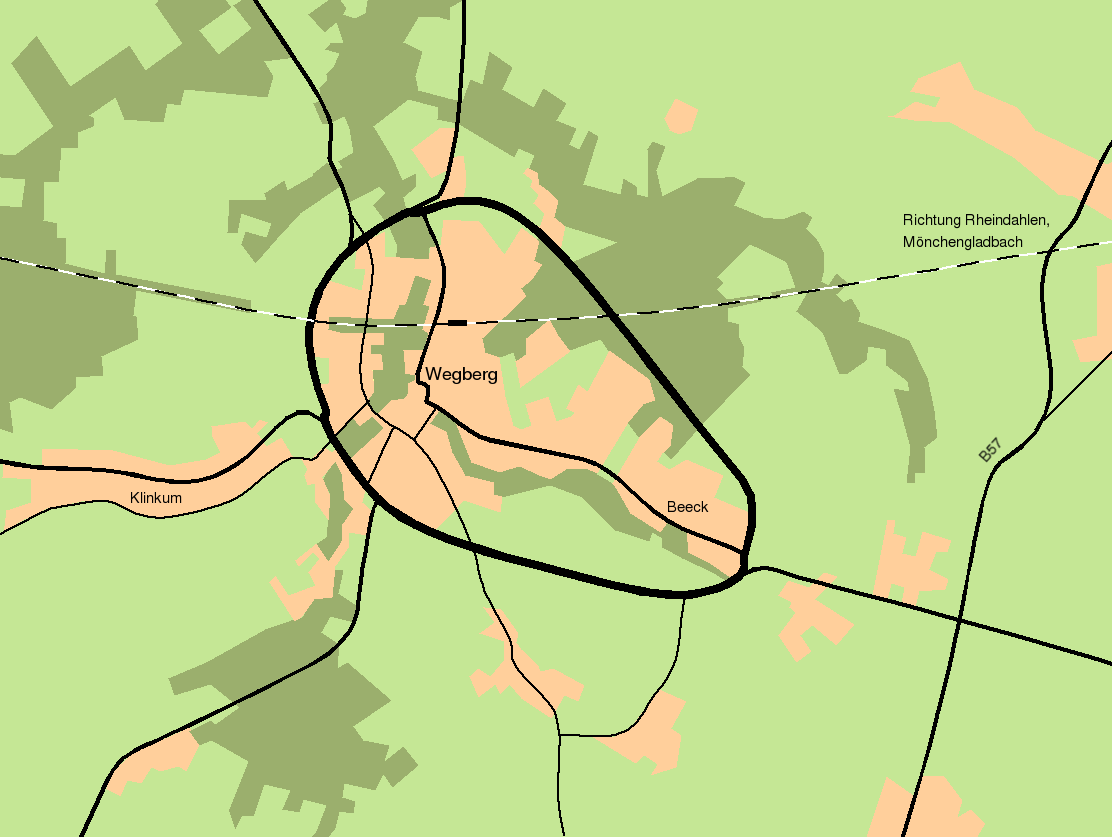
Map of the current Grenzlandring

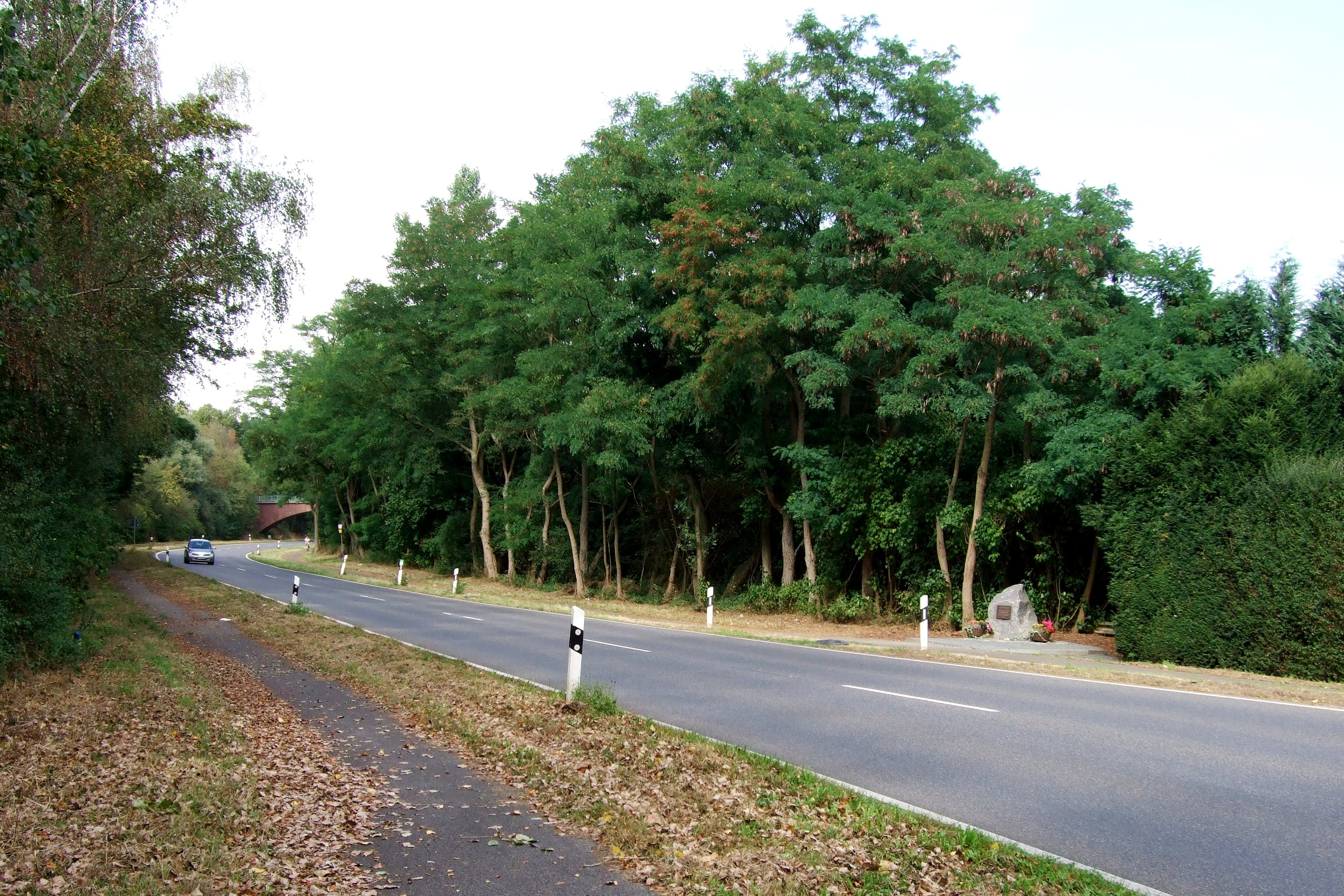
The Grenzlandring, pictured in 2012 from the spot of the 1952 accident, with the new memorial stone set up 60 years after Niedermayr's crash

The Grenzlandring ("border-region ring"), sometimes written Grenzland-Ring, was a high-speed oval race track in the Lower Rhine area of Germany, around the town of Wegberg and close to Mönchengladbach and the Dutch town of Roermond.

The concrete ring was secretly constructed in 1938-1939 as a "strategically important" supply route for construction of Nazi Germany's Westwall fortifications, at total cost of about 3.3 million Reichsmark. As a military project, it was not shown on road maps. After minor use early in World War II, the ring was disused, but survived the war largely intact.

Immediately after the war, parts of the ring were used by U.S. and British military units. In 1947, the Grenzlandring, also known as the Wegbergring or Wegberg-Ring, was locally "rediscovered" when Carl Marcus, mayor of nearby Rheydt, drove one night along what seemed to be a more or less straight country road. When he passed a bicycle rider more than once, he suddenly realized that the road was in fact circular.

Beginning in the late 1940s, the ring was used for auto and motorcycle racing. The all-time lap record was set in September 1949 by Bavarian Georg "Schorsch" Meier on a supercharged BMW 500 motorbike at 216 km/h (134 mph), and in September 1951 Toni Ulmen set the all-time record for cars, driving his Veritas 2000 RS to 212 km/h (132 mph).

On August 31, 1952, for reasons never completely explained, Berliner Helmut Niedermayr crashed his Formula Two Reif/Veritas-Meteor at the exit of the Roermonder Kurve at nearly 200 km/h (120 mph),, killing 13 spectators and injuring another 42. Although the actual event was not stopped to avert panic in the crowds, racing was subsequently banned from the ring by the government, after a total of five competitions attended by an estimated 300,000 people.

Subsequently, a southern section of the road was removed, while the remaining portion was asphalted for local traffic.

== See also ==
- List of motor racing tracks
- Superspeedway
