= Arthur Elliot (politician) =

British journalist and politician

The Honourable Arthur Elliot
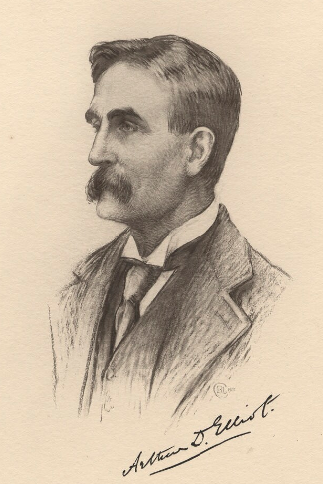

Financial Secretary to the Treasury
- In office 10 April 1903 – 9 October 1903
- Monarch: Edward VII
- Prime Minister: Arthur Balfour
- Preceded by: William Hayes Fisher
- Succeeded by: Victor Cavendish

Personal details
- Born: 17 December 1846
- Died: 12 February 1923 (aged 76)
- Party: Liberal; Liberal Unionist
- Education: University of Edinburgh; Trinity College, Cambridge

Arthur Ralph Douglas Elliot (17 December 1846 – 12 February 1923) was a British journalist and Liberal and Liberal Unionist politician.

== Background and education ==
Elliot was the second son of Emma Eleanor Elizabeth (née Hyslop) and William Elliot-Murray-Kynynmound, 3rd Earl of Minto. Gilbert Elliot-Murray-Kynynmound, 4th Earl of Minto, was his elder brother and the Honourable Hugh Elliot his younger brother.

At age four his leg was amputated as the result of a fall.

He was educated at the University of Edinburgh and Trinity College, Cambridge.

== Political career ==
Elliot was elected to the House of Commons for Roxburghshire in 1880 as a Liberal, and held that seat until 1892, having joined the Liberal Unionists when the Irish Home Rule split the Liberal Party in 1886. After his defeat by the Liberal candidate at the 1892 general election, he did not stand again in Roxburghshire, and at the 1895 general election he stood in the City of Durham, losing by 3 votes to the sitting Liberal MP, Matthew Fowler. After Fowler's death in 1898, Elliot won the resulting by-election, though with a margin of only 65 votes.

He was re-elected in Durham at the 1900 general election with a much bigger majority, but his support of free trade then brought him into conflict with the Durham Constitutional Association (the local Conservative and Liberal Unionist organisation), some of whose members were backing John Waller Hills as an alternative for the next election. Elliot resigned from the Durham Constitutional Association in February 1905, and contested the general election in January 1906 as a "Free Trade" Liberal candidate, with the support of the local Liberal Association. In a straight contest between Elliot and Hills (who had been adopted as the Conservative and Liberal Unionist candidate), Hills took the seat with 60% of the votes. He served briefly as Financial Secretary to the Treasury under Arthur Balfour between April and October 1903. Apart from his political career he was also editor of the Edinburgh Review.

== Family ==
Elliot married Madeline Harriet Dagmar, daughter of Sir Charles Lister Ryan, in 1888. They had two sons, of whom only the youngest reached adulthood. Madeline died in January 1906. Elliot lived for many years in Freshwater, Isle of Wight and remained a widower until his death in February 1923, aged 76.

Parliament of the United Kingdom
Preceded by Sir George Scott-Douglas, Bt	Member of Parliament for Roxburghshire; 1880 – 1892	Succeeded by Mark Napier
Preceded by Matthew Fowler	Member of Parliament for Durham; 1898 – 1906	Succeeded by John Hills
Political offices
Preceded by Hayes Fisher	Financial Secretary to the Treasury; April–October 1903	Succeeded by Victor Cavendish
