= Guy Gale =

British racing driver

Major Guy F. K. Gale
- Nationality: (United Kingdom) British

Guy Gale was a British racing driver, as well as a Major in the British Army.

== Racing Driver ==
Guy was a competent racing driver who raced mainly between 1949 and 1953. During these years, recording a number of good results, including six wins and 22 podiums finishes, with the majority of these at national events. His greatest racing achievement, when partnered by James Scott Douglas, he finished second in the 1953 24 Heures de Spa Francorchamps.

== Racing record ==
=== Career highlights ===
Season	Series	Position	Team	Car
1953	24 Heures de Spa Francorchamps	2nd	Ecurie Ecosse	Jaguar C-Type

=== Complete 24 Hours of Spa results ===
Year	Team	Co-Drivers	Car	Class	Laps	Pos.	Class Pos.
1953	(United Kingdom) Ecurie Ecosse	(United Kingdom) James Scott Douglas	Jaguar C-Type	S	242	2nd	2nd
