= Henry Moore (cricketer) =

English cricketer (1849–1916)

Personal information
- Full name: Henry Walter Moore
- Born: 1849; Cranbrook, Kent, England
- Died: 20 August 1916 (aged 66–67); Upper Norwood, London, England
- Batting: Right-handed
- Relatives: Arthur Moore (brother); John Lysaght Moore (nephew)

Domestic team information
- Years: Team
- 1876-77 to 1878-79: Canterbury
- 1894-95: Taranaki

Career statistics
Competition	First-class
Matches	5
Runs scored	185
Batting average	30.83
100s/50s	0/2
Top score	76
Balls bowled	28
Wickets	1
Bowling average	3.00
5 wickets in innings	0
10 wickets in match	0
Best bowling	1/3
Catches/stumpings	2/0
- Source: Cricinfo, 20 October 2018

Henry Walter Moore (1849 – 20 August 1916) was an English-born first-class cricketer who spent most of his life in New Zealand.

== Life and family ==
Henry Moore was born in Cranbrook, Kent, in 1849. He was the son of the Reverend Edward Moore and Lady Harriet Janet Sarah Montagu-Scott, who was one of the daughters of the 4th Duke of Buccleuch. One of his brothers, Arthur, became an admiral and was knighted. Their great-grandfather was John Moore, Archbishop of Canterbury from 1783 to 1805. One of their sisters was a maid of honour to Queen Victoria.

Moore went to New Zealand in 1876 and lived in Geraldine and Christchurch. He married Henrietta Lysaght of Hāwera in November 1879, and they had one son. In May 1884 she died a few days after giving birth to a daughter, who also died.

In 1886 Moore became a Justice of the Peace in Geraldine. In 1897 he married Alice Fish of Geraldine. They moved to England four years before his death in 1916.

== Cricket career ==
Moore was a right-handed middle-order batsman. In consecutive seasons, 1876–77 and 1877–78, playing for Canterbury, he made the highest score in the short New Zealand first-class season: 76 and 75 respectively. His 76 came in his first match for Canterbury, against Otago. He went to the wicket early on the first day with the score at 7 for 2 and put on 99 for the third wicket with Charles Corfe before he was out with the score at 106 for 3 after a "very fine exhibition of free hitting, combined with good defence". Canterbury were all out for 133, but went on to win the match. His 75 came in the next season's match against Otago, when he took the score from 22 for 2 to 136 for 6. The New Zealand cricket historian Tom Reese said, "Right from the beginning he smote the bowling hip and thigh, going out of his ground to indulge in some forceful driving." Canterbury won again.

Moore led the batting averages in the Canterbury Cricket Association in 1877–78 with 379 runs at an average of 34.4. Also in 1877–78, he was a member of the Canterbury team that inflicted the only defeat on the touring Australians. In 1896–97, at the age of 47, he top-scored in each innings for a South Canterbury XVIII against the touring Queensland cricket team.
