= George Elliot (Royal Navy officer, born 1784) =

Royal Navy Admiral (1784–1863)

Admiral The Honourable Sir George Elliot KCB FRS
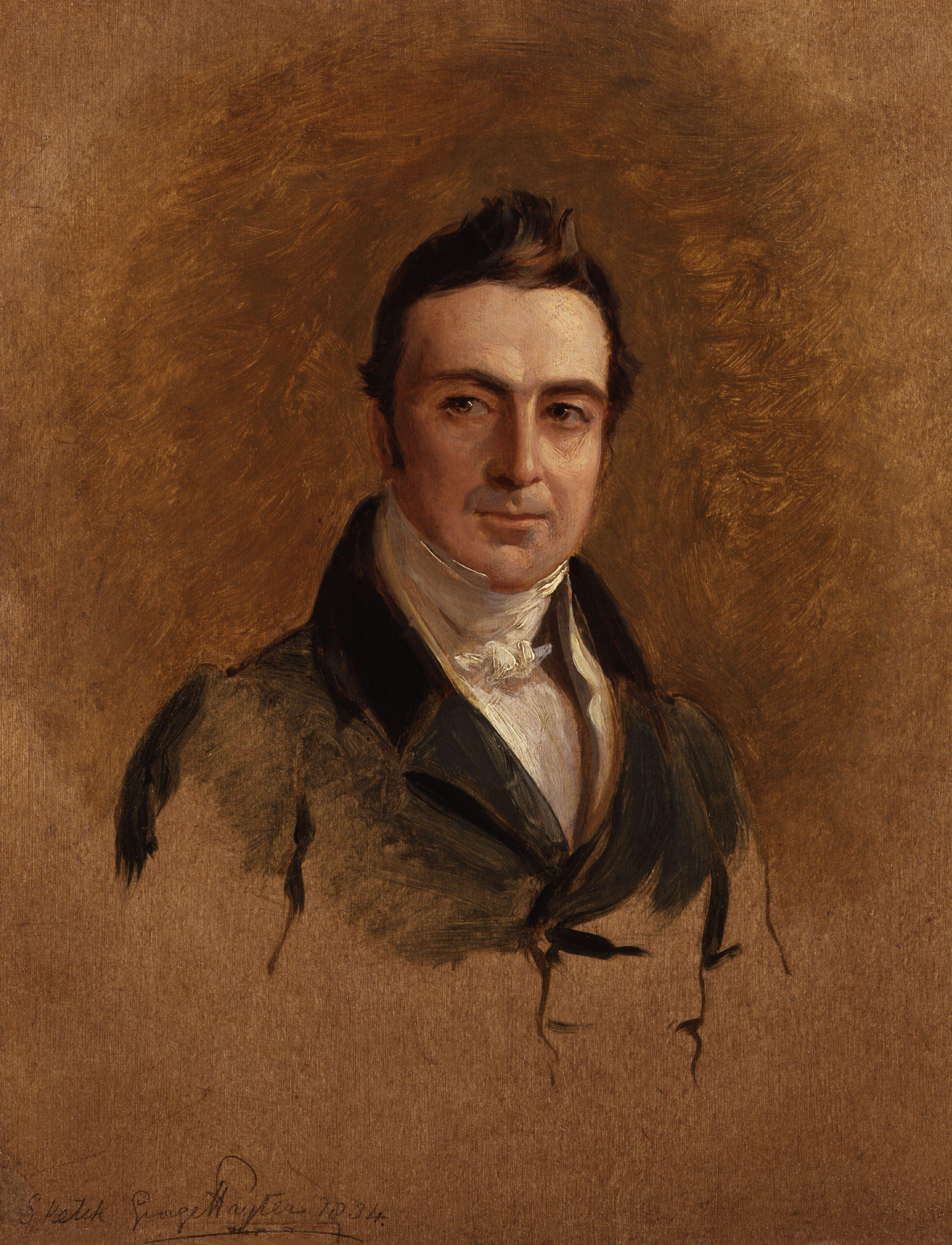
- Portrait by George Hayter, 1834
- Born: 1 August 1784
- Died: 24 June 1863 (aged 78); Kensington, London
- Burial place: Kensal Green Cemetery, London
- Spouse: Eliza Ness
- Relatives: Gilbert Elliot-Murray-Kynynmound, 1st Earl of Minto (father); Gilbert Elliot-Murray-Kynynmound, 2nd Earl of Minto (brother); George Elliot (son); Charles Elliot (cousin)
- Military career
- Allegiance: Great Britain; United Kingdom
- Branch: Royal Navy
- Service years: 1794–1863
- Rank: Admiral
- Commands: Nore Command; East Indies and China Station; Cape of Good Hope Station; HMS Victory; HMS Hussar; HMS Modeste; HMS Aurora; HMS Combatant; HMS Maidstone; HMS Termagant
- Conflicts: French Revolutionary Wars; Naval Battle of Genoa; Naval Battle of Hyères Islands; Battle of Cape St Vincent; Battle of the Nile; Battle of Copenhagen; Napoleonic Wars; Invasion of Java; First Opium War
- Awards: Knight Commander of the Order of the Bath

Admiral Sir George Elliot KCB FRS (1 August 1784 – 24 June 1863) was a Royal Navy officer who served during the French Revolutionary and Napoleonic Wars, and the First Opium War.

Elliot was born to an influential and distinguished family that included several powerful politicians and diplomats. After entering the navy at an early age he served through several of the decisive battles of the French Revolutionary Wars, seeing action at Genoa, Hyères, and Cape St Vincent and under Nelson at the Nile and Copenhagen. He had graduated to his own commands by the outbreak of the Napoleonic Wars, being described by Nelson as one of the best officers in the navy, and served with distinction in the Mediterranean and in the East Indies, where he took part in the Invasion of Java. Left without significant employment after the end of the wars with France, Elliot took up politics, with the support of the Duke of Clarence and his relatives already in government office.

Elliot briefly represented Roxburghshire in Parliament, and served as Secretary to the Admiralty and later one of the Lords Commissioners of the Admiralty. He briefly returned to active naval service with his elevation to flag rank, and commanded the station at the Cape of Good Hope. He went out to superintend operations in China during the First Opium War, but failed to make any decisive difference, and returned to Britain. Here he found factional politics had reduced his and his relations' former influence in government, and he thereafter only served in a minor capacity in the navy, and did not return to government office. He died in 1863, having risen by seniority to the rank of admiral, fathered a large family which included high-ranking military officers, and their spouses, and having made a distinct contribution to naval policy during his time in politics.

== Family and early life ==
George Elliot was born on 1 August 1784, the second son of Gilbert Elliot-Murray-Kynynmound, 1st Earl of Minto and his wife Anna Maria. George Elliot was the brother of Gilbert Elliot-Murray-Kynynmound, the future second Earl of Minto. George Elliot joined the navy as a first-class volunteer in 1794, shortly after the outbreak of the French Revolutionary Wars and served at first aboard the 98-gun HMS St George under Captain Thomas Foley. The St George was at the time the flagship of Sir Hyde Parker. While aboard St George Elliot saw action at the Naval Battle of Genoa on 14 March 1795 and the Naval Battle of Hyères Islands on 13 June 1795.

Elliot continued to serve under Foley for the next few years, moving with him in succession to HMS Britannia, aboard which he saw action at the Battle of Cape St Vincent on 14 February 1797, HMS Goliath, which fought at the Battle of the Nile on 1–3 August 1798 and then aboard HMS Elephant. After seeing action in several of the decisive naval battles of the French Revolutionary Wars Elliot was promoted to lieutenant on 12 August 1800. He went on to serve under admirals Sir Charles Pole and Horatio Nelson in this capacity in 1801, initially aboard HMS San Josef and then aboard HMS St George. While serving aboard St George, which was then under the command of Captain Thomas Hardy, Elliot accompanied the expeditionary fleet to the Baltic under Sir Hyde Parker, and took part in the fighting during the Battle of Copenhagen. He was promoted to the rank of commander on 14 April 1802, and went out to the Mediterranean in May the following year with Nelson, as a volunteer on his flagship HMS Victory.

== Command ==
Nelson gave Elliot his first command on 10 July 1803, appointing him to the sloop HMS Termagant. His time in command of her was brief, and on 1 August he was moved to the 32-gun HMS Maidstone. He received a promotion to post-captain on 2 January 1804, and commanded Maidstone at the blockade of Toulon. On 11 July 1804 boats from Maidstone, and those from HMS Narcissus and HMS Seahorse took part in the destruction of vessels at Lavandou. He was then briefly attached to the squadron blockading Cádiz under Captain Sir Richard Strachan, and it was around this time that Nelson described him as one of the best officers in the navy. Elliot spent the rest of the war serving on several different stations, at times in home waters, and with spells in the Mediterranean, and in the East Indies.

He was made captain of HMS Combatant in March 1805. In July 1805 he recommissioned the 22-gun HMS Aurora for service in the Mediterranean, and in October 1806 took command of the 36-gun HMS Modeste. Elliot commanded her for the next six years, and sailed for the East Indies and China on 15 February 1807. On 8 October 1808 he chased down and captured the 18-gun French corvette Iéna while in the Bay of Bengal, and on 15 July 1809 boats from Modeste and HMS Barracouta cut out the 8-gun Tuijneelar in the Sunda Straits. Elliot then took part in the operations to capture Java between August and September 1811. He took command of the 38-gun HMS Hussar in 1813 and was involved in the suppression of Borneo pirates in June. His actions during these campaigns brought the attention of his superiors, as did his assistance to Colonel McGregor in restoring the Sultan of Palembang. The end of the Napoleonic Wars left him without any commands, though he was able to secure a posting to command HMS Victory, then serving as the guardship at Portsmouth from 1 May 1827 until 24 January 1832. His service during this period earned Elliot the praise of the Duke of Clarence, the future King William IV.

== Flag rank and political career ==
King William appointed Elliot a naval aide-de-camp in 1830, and in September that year he was nominated a Companion of the Bath. The King also asked him to serve as Secretary to the Admiralty from 29 November 1830, a post he held until December 1834. In addition to these offices Elliot sat as a Whig Member of Parliament for Roxburghshire from 1832 until his defeat in 1835. In 1834 he was elected a Fellow of the Royal Society. He was also one of the Lords Commissioners of the Admiralty (the Third Naval Lord) from April 1835.

The First Lord of the Admiralty between September 1835 to September 1841, during Elliot's time as commissioner, was his brother, Gilbert Elliot-Murray-Kynynmound, 2nd Earl of Minto. George Elliot specialised in ship design and construction, notably opposing Sir William Symonds, the Surveyor of the Navy, and his system. Together with First Naval Lord Sir Charles Adam he pressed for money to be spent on repairing ships rather than building new ones. He designed a small frigate during this period, which was launched in 1843 as HMS Eurydice. The design attracted much comment, particularly praising her fine lines and speed, and for a time she was commanded by his son, Captain George Elliot. She later became a training ship and foundered with heavy loss of life in a squall off the Isle of Wight on 24 March 1878.

Elliot was promoted to rear-admiral on 10 January 1837 and in September that year went out as commander-in-chief of the Cape of Good Hope Station. He was then sent to China in February 1840, during the First Opium War, as commander-in-chief East Indies and China Station and joint plenipotentiary with his cousin, Captain Charles Elliot. He oversaw operations between July and November, but his actions and negotiations were viewed by the foreign secretary, Lord Palmerston, as being irresolute and ineffective. Elliot himself admitted that he was out of his depth, and on his health deteriorating, returned to Britain in November.

By the time of his return the political situation had changed. The formation of the First Russell ministry in 1846 led to the exclusion of the Elliot clan from the Admiralty by the powerful Lansdowne faction. George Elliot became a vice-admiral on 13 May 1847, and served as Commander-in-Chief, The Nore between 1848 and 1851. He attained the rank of full admiral on 5 March 1853, and was placed on the retired list at half pay in 1855. He was advanced to a Knight Commander of the Order of the Bath in November 1862, and died on 24 June the following year at his home, 4 Princes Terrace, Kensington, London. He was buried at Kensal Green Cemetery in a private ceremony.

== Family and issue ==
George Elliot married Eliza Cecilia in 1810 and went on to have a large family together. Their eldest son, George Elliot, entered the navy and became an admiral, while another son, Alexander Elliot, entered the Army and became a major-general. Of his daughters, Georgiana Maria married William Carnegie, 8th Earl of Northesk, Eliza married William Compton, 4th Marquess of Northampton and Catherine Francis married James Robert Drummond.

== See also ==
- O'Byrne, William Richard (1849). "Elliot, George (a)" . A Naval Biographical Dictionary . John Murray – via Wikisource.

== Notes ==
Political offices
Preceded by John Wilson Croker	Secretary of the Admiralty; 1830–1834	Succeeded by George Robert Dawson
Parliament of the United Kingdom
Preceded by Henry Hepburne-Scott	Member of Parliament for Roxburghshire; 1832–1835	Succeeded by Lord John Douglas-Montagu-Scott
Military offices
Preceded by Sir Charles Rowley	Third Naval Lord; 1835–1837	Succeeded by Sir Edward Troubridge
Preceded by Patrick Campbell	Commander-in-Chief, Cape of Good Hope Station; 1837–1840	Succeeded by Sir Edward Durnford King
Preceded by Sir Gordon Bremer	Commander-in-Chief, East Indies and China Station; July 1840 – November 1840	Succeeded by Sir Gordon Bremer
Preceded by Sir Edward Durnford King	Commander-in-Chief, The Nore; 1848–1851	Succeeded by Josceline Percy
