= Toni Ulmen =

German motorcycle racer and racing driver (1906–1976)

- Nationality: (West Germany) German
- Born: Anton Ulmen; 25 January 1906 Düsseldorf, German Empire
- Died: 4 November 1976 (aged 70) Düsseldorf, West Germany
Toni Ulmen
Formula One World Championship career
- Active years: 1952
- Team: privateer Veritas-Meteor
- Entries: 2
- First entry: 1952 Swiss Grand Prix
- Last entry: 1952 German Grand Prix

Anton "Toni" Ulmen (25 January 1906 – 4 November 1976) was a German motorcycle and racing driver. His racing career started in 1925 on a 250 cc Velocette. In 1927 he won the opening race of the Nürburgring on a 350 cc Velocette. In 1929 he won the 350 cc class on the Eilenriede, a non-permanent race course near Hanover. From 1949 to 1952, he was four times German sports car and Formula 2 champion.

== Craftsman, businessman and racer ==
After leaving school, Ulmen served an apprenticeship as a machinist with Motorradwerkstatt Hasenclever. When he finished there, he founded Gebrüder Ulmen, with his brother Andreas. They become the representatives of Opel for Düsseldorf.

It was in 1925 that Ulmen began his career in motorsport, at the Großen Deutschland-Rundfahrt on a 250cc Velocette motor cycle. Two years later can riding a 350 cc Velocette he won the first Eifelrennen, to claim the Deutsche Tourist-Trophäe, the inaugural race held on the Nürburgring. In 1929, he won another major German race, the 350cc race of Eilenridederennens in Hanover. By 1930, Ulmen was a works rider for NSU.

== After the War ==
After the war, Ulmen turned to car racing, taking a second place in his first major sportscar race, the Karlsruhe-Durlach, abroad a BMW 328. A year later, in 1947 he was awarded the title of best German sports car driver of the year.

The 1949 season saw Ulmen win nine races, including the Solituderennen and the DMV Grenzlandringrennen. He was won races at Munich, Nürburgring, Sachsenring and Kölner Kurs. He also recorded seven second place that season. 1950 saw the first Großer Preis von Deutschland after World War II, at the Nürburgring, where he finished fourth in his open-wheel Veritas RS. In this car, he also recorded a surprising third place in the Preis der Ostechweiz-Erlen in Switzerland, beaten only by the Scuderia Ferraris of Luigi Villoresi and Roberto Vallone. Prior to 1950, there was a ban on German cars and drivers completing in foreign events, after the war. He retained his German Champion title, he first won in 1949.

With victories at Hockenheim, the Schauinsland Hillclimb, and the Grenzlandring, Ulmen was clear champion in the 2-litre Sports Car class. He participated in two World Championship Grands Prix in 1952, debuting on 18 May 1952, in the Grosser Preis der Schweiz, but retired due to fuel tank issues. He returned for the Großer Preis von Deutschland, where despite his Veritas's power disadvantage compared to his rivals, his finished eighth. That season also saw Ulmen win the DMV Grenalandringrennen again. During the season, he suffered a heavy crash during a practise session on the Sachsenring from which he escaped almost unscathed. He arrived at the final meeting of the 1952 season, the Avusrennen, as leader in the Formula 2 class and 2-litre sport cars. On the AVUS, lost a dramatic slipstream battle with fellow Veritas driver, Fritz Rieß, on the penultimate lap. This meant both drivers were equal on points, and according to the DMV regulations, Rieß was declared champion, as he had scored the better at the Eifelrennen. As consolidation, Ulmen was awarded the Formula 2 title, despite the fact he could take part in this race. After that he competed only occasionally in car races.

Despite his retirement early 1953, Ulmen was soon, albeit briefly, behind the wheel, sharing a Jaguar D-Type with Herman Roosdorp to third place in his only 24-hour endurance race, the 1953 24 Heures de Spa Francorchamps.

== Away from the track ==
Following his racing retirement, Ulmen become president of the Deutscher Motorsport Verband (DMW) and he received the Silbernes Lorbeerblatt award from President of Germany, Theodor Heuss for his successes in motorsport, the highest national award in Germany for an athlete.

== Racing record ==
=== Career highlights ===
Season	Series	Position	Team	Car
1927	Deutsche Tourist-Trophäe	1st		Velocette
1946	Karlsruher Dreiecksrennen	2nd	Toni Ulmen	BMW 328
1947	Stadtparkrenne Hamburg	1st	Toni Ulmen	BMW 328
	Rund um Schotten	3rd	Toni Ulmen	BMW 328
1949	Deutsche Meisterschaft	1st	Toni Ulmen	Veritas-BMW RS
	Maipokalrennen	1st	Toni Ulmen	Veritas-BMW RS
	Riemer Flugplatzrennen	1st	Toni Ulmen	Veritas-BMW RS
	Großer Preis von Nürburgring	1st	Toni Ulmen	Veritas-BMW RS
	DMV Grenzlandringrennen	1st	Toni Ulmen	Veritas-BMW RS
	Solituderennen	1st	Toni Ulmen	Veritas-BMW RS
	Kölner Kurs	1st	Toni Ulmen	Veritas-BMW RS
	Rund um Schotten	2nd	Toni Ulmen	Veritas-BMW RS
	Tübinger Stadtring-Rennen	2nd	Toni Ulmen	Veritas-BMW RS
1950	Deutsche Meisterschaft	1st	Toni Ulmen	Veritas-BMW RS Spezial
	Sachsenringrennen	1st	ADAC	Veritas-BMW RS Spezial
	Internationales ADAC Eifelrennen	2nd	Toni Ulmen	Veritas-BMW RS Spezial
	Preis der Ostschweiz-Erlen	3rd	Toni Ulmen	Veritas-BMW RS Spezial
	Maipokalrennen	3rd	Toni Ulmen	Veritas-BMW RS Spezial
1951	Schauinsland Hillclimb	1st	Toni Ulmen	Veritas-BMW RS Großmutter
	Internationales AvD AVUS-Rennen	2nd	Toni Ulmen	Veritas Meteor
	DMV Grenzlandringrennen	3rd	Toni Ulmen	Veritas Meteor
	Meisterschaft West Deutschlands	4th	Toni Ulmen	Veritas Meteor
1952	Meisterschaft West Deutschlands	1st	Toni Ulmen	Veritas-BMW RS
	DMV Grenzlandringrennen	1st	Toni Ulmen	Veritas-BMW RS
	Internationales ADAC-Eifel-Rennen Nürburgring	2nd	Toni Ulmen	Veritas-BMW RS Großmutter
	24 Heures de Spa Francorchamps	3rd	Herman Roosdorp	Jaguar C-Type

=== Complete Formula One World Championship results ===
(key)

Year	Entrant	Chassis	Engine	1	2	3	4	5	6	7	8	WDC	Points
1952	Toni Ulmen	Veritas-Meteor	Veritas Straight-6	SUI; Ret	500	BEL	FRA	GBR	GER; 8	NED	ITA	NC	0

=== Complete 24 Hours of Spa results ===
Year	Team	Co-Drivers	Car	Class	Pos.	Class Pos.
1953	(Belgium) Herman Roosdorp	(Belgium) Herman Roosdorp	Jaguar C-Type	S	3rd	3rd
