= Herman Roosdorp =

Dutch racecar driver

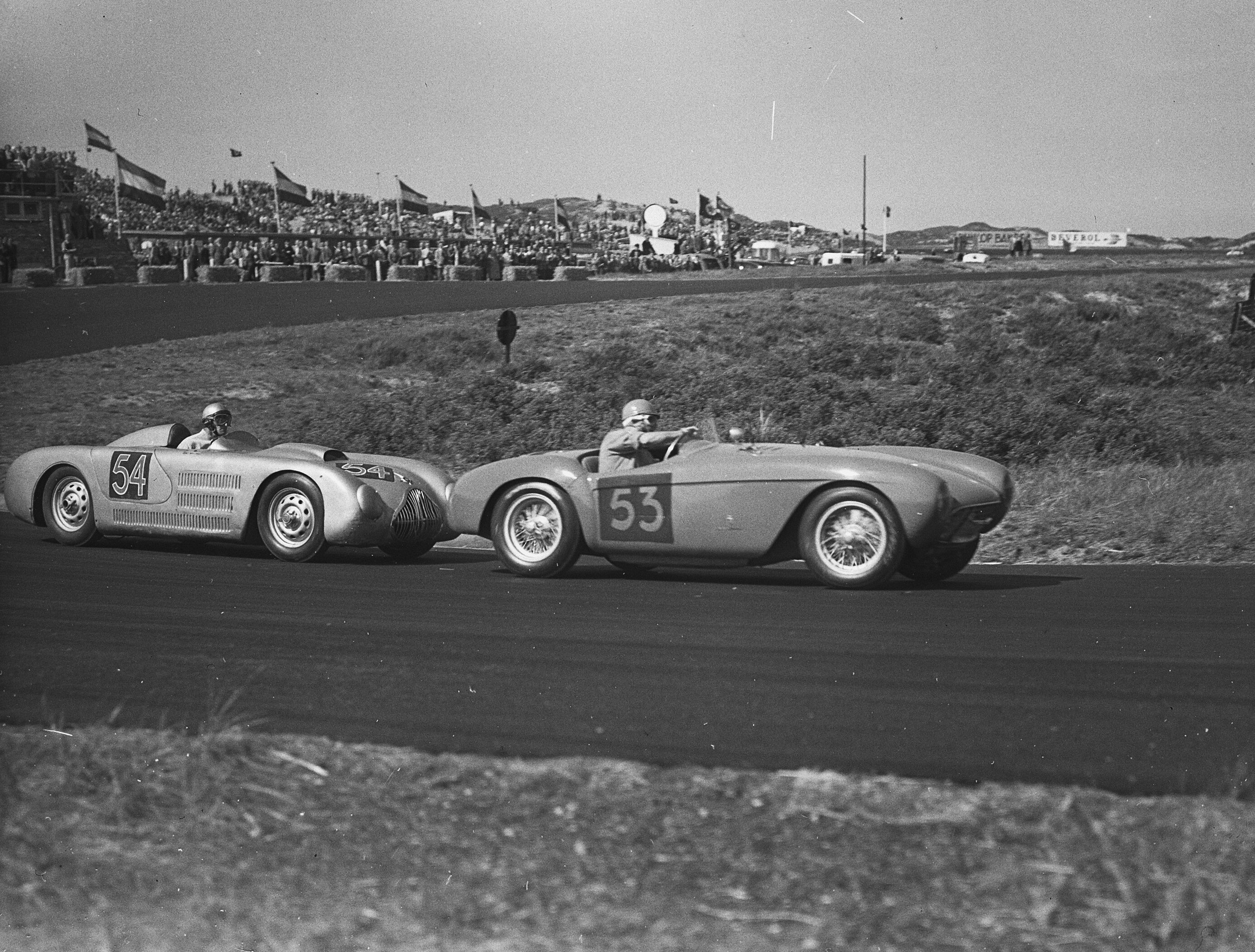
- Nationality: (Netherlands) Dutch
- Born: 19 April 1895; Haarlem
- Died: 1 January 1965 (aged 69)

Herman Roosdorp was a Dutch racing driver who lived a long period of his life in Belgium. He was born on 19 April 1895. He started as a house painter before becoming a car dealer. He was the first Dutch man to buy a Ferrari. In Antwerp (Borgerhout) he owned a garage and was dealer for Vanguard. His daughter Anni Roosdorp did also pursue a racing career.

== Racing Driver ==
Herman was a racing driver who raced mainly between 1949 and 1954, mostly in Ferraris. During these years, recording a number of good results, including a wins and numerous podiums finishes, with the majority of these at national events. His greatest racing achievement, when partnered by Toni Ulmen, he finished third in the 24 Heures de Spa Francorchamps. He introduced the Coupe Roosdorp or Roosdorp Cup, that was awarded to the driver of the day during the National races at Zandvoort. A group of journalists chose this driver.

== Racing record ==
=== Career highlights ===
| Season | Series | Position | Team | Car |
|---|---|---|---|---|
| 1949 | DMV Grenzlanringrennen | 2nd | Herman Roosdorp | Ferrari 166 SC |
| | Großer Preis von Nürburgring | 3rd | Herman Roosdorp | Veritas-BMW RS |
| 1950 | 12 heures de Paris | 3rd | Herman Roosdorp | Ferrari 166 MM |
| 1953 | 24 Heures de Spa Francorchamps | 3rd | Herman Roosdorp | Jaguar C-Type |

=== Complete 24 Hours of Spa results ===
| Year | Team | Co-Drivers | Car | Class | Pos. | Class Pos. |
|---|---|---|---|---|---|---|
| 1949 | (Netherlands) Herman Roosdorp | (Belgium) Adolf de Ridder | Ferrari 166 MM | S2.0 | 8th | 8th |
| 1953 | (Netherlands) Herman Roosdorp | (West Germany) Toni Ulmen | Jaguar C-Type | S | 3rd | 3rd |

=== Complete 12 Hours of Paris results ===
| Year | Team | Co-Drivers | Car | Class | Pos. | Class Pos. |
|---|---|---|---|---|---|---|
| 1950 | (Netherlands) Herman Roosdorp | (Belgium) André Pilette | Ferrari 166 MM | S2.0 | 3rd | 2nd |
