= Mark Napier (MP) =

Scottish Liberal Party politician

Member of Parliament for Roxburghshire
- In office 4 July 1892 – 13 July 1895
- Preceded by: Arthur Elliot
- Succeeded by: John Montagu Douglas Scott

Personal details
- Born: 21 January 1852 Naples, Kingdom of the Two Sicilies
- Died: 19 August 1919 (aged 67) Inverness
- Party: Liberal

Mark Francis Napier (21 January 1852 – 19 August 1919) was a Scottish Liberal Party politician who served as the Member of Parliament (MP) for Roxburghshire in the 25th Parliament between 1892 and 1895.

Napier was born in Naples, the fourth son of Francis Napier, 10th Lord Napier. Educated at Wellington College, Berkshire, and Trinity College, Cambridge, he was a Freemason who joined the Isaac Newton University Lodge whilst a student at university. After graduating from Cambridge with a BA degree in 1874, Napier was then called to the Bar at the Inner Temple two years later. He subsequently practised as a barrister prior to being elected to Parliament.

Parliament of the United Kingdom
Preceded by Arthur Elliot	Member of Parliament for Roxburghshire; 1892–1895	Succeeded by Earl of Dalkeith
