= George Brisbane Scott Douglas =

Sir George Brisbane Scott Douglas, 5th Baronet (1856–1935) was a Scottish poet and writer, as well as a Baronet.

Douglas was born on 22 December 1856 in Gibraltar, of which his mother, Doña Sanchez de Pina, was a native. He combined the running of a large country estate with his literary and academic endeavours. He never married and, on his death in 1935, he was succeeded by his nephew, James Louis Fitzroy Scott Douglas, who never resided at the family home of five generations, Springwood Park, near Kelso, Scottish Borders.

Educated at Harrow and Trinity College in Cambridge, his first book was published in 1880. He authored some of his books under the name of Sir George Douglas. The family seat was Springwood House, Kelso in the Scottish Borders. He died on 22 June 1935, aged 78.

== Works ==
- Poems (1880)
- The Fireside Tragedy (1896)
- New Border Tales (1892)
- Poems of a Country Gentleman (1897)
- Scottish Fairy and Folk Tales (reprinted 1901 by W. Scott Publication Company)
- Scottish Poetry: Drummond of Hawthornden to Fergusson (1911)

In 1899, he published both an authoritative biography of James Hogg and the History of the Border Counties: Roxburgh, Selkirk and Peebles; the latter was published by William Blackwood & Sons.

== Footnotes ==
Baronetage of Great Britain
Preceded by George Henry Scott-Douglas	Baronet (of Maxwell); 1885–1935	Succeeded by James Scott Douglas
