= 1953 Spa 24 Hours =

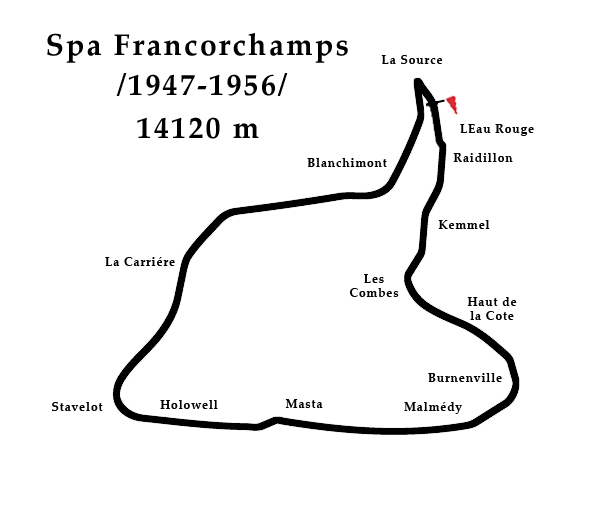
Layout of the Circuit de Spa-Francorchamps (1947-1956)

The 1953 24 Heures de Spa Francorchamps took place on 25 and 26 July 1953, at the Circuit de Spa-Francorchamps (Belgium). It was also the fourth round of the FIA World Sports Car Championship. This was the first time the event had taken place since Luigi Chinetti and Jean Lucas won in 1949. The race was not run again until 1964.

== Report ==
=== Entry ===
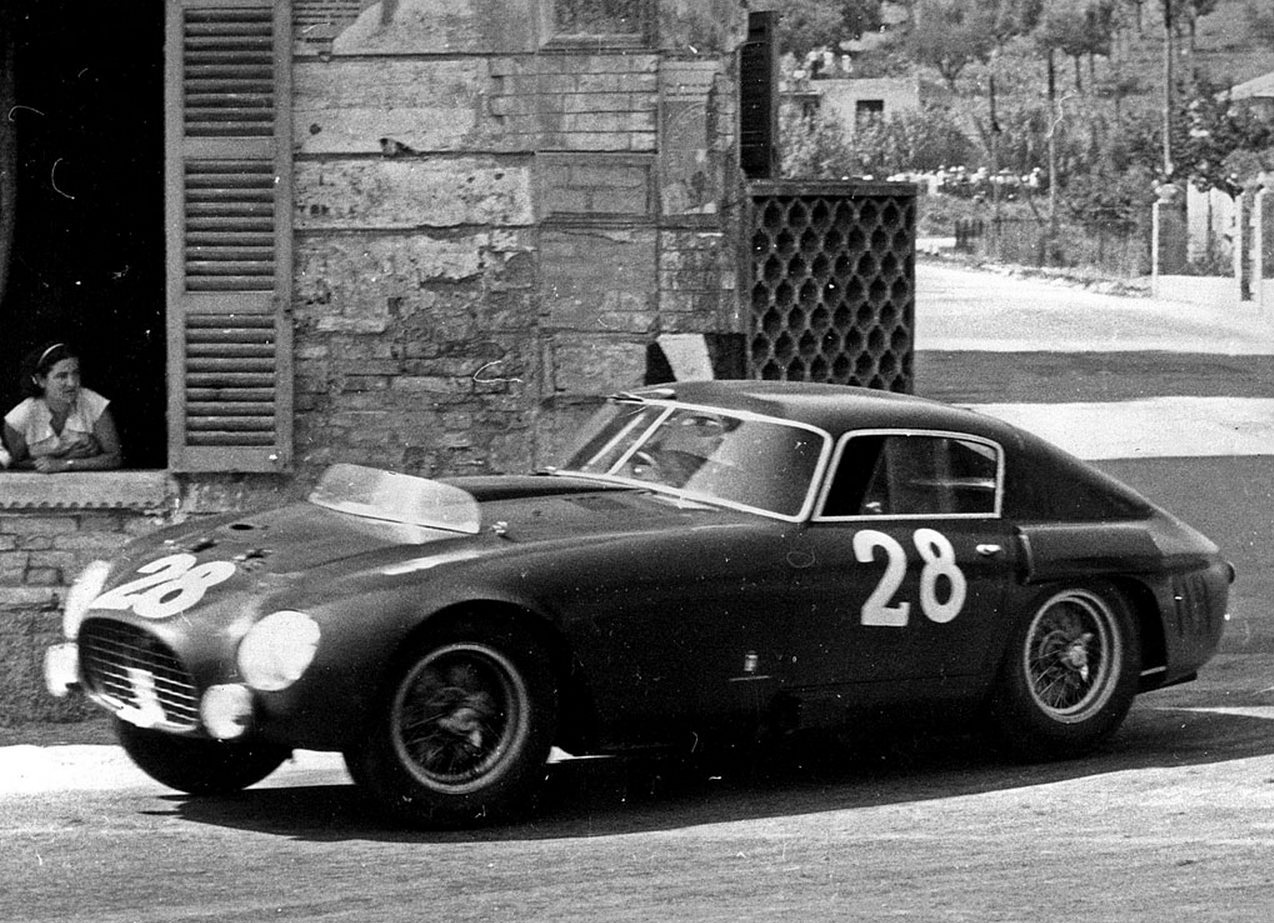
The race was won by a Ferrari 375 MM, similar to that pictured

A grand total 43 racing cars were registered for this event, of which 40 arrived for practise and qualifying. From Italy, the two work teams of Scuderia Ferrari and S. P. A. Alfa Romeo. The Scuderia from Maranello arrived with three cars, all 375 MM's. In the cockpits sat the driver pairings, Giuseppe Farina / Mike Hawthorn, Luigi Villoresi / Alberto Ascari and Umberto Maglioli with Piero Carini. Alfa Romeo brought two cars to Belgium, which went into different classes at the start. Juan Manuel Fangio and Consalvo Sanesi piloted an Alfa Romeo 6C 3000 CM in the sports car category. Max Thirion, together with Mario Damonte were entered in an Alfa Romeo 1900 in the touring car class. The host country was represented by the Ecurie Francorchamps, which entered a Jaguar C-Type and a Ferrari 212 Export.

=== Qualifying ===
The Ferrari 375 MM of Mike Hawthorn took pole position, averaging a speed of 113.871 mph around the 8.77 mile circuit. However, following an accident in practise, the Fiat 1100 of “Thillios” and Johnny Claes was withdrawn, leaving 39 cars to start.

=== Race ===
The day of the race would be warm and dry, but that would mean very little as the team prepared for the start at 4pm. As the field took off, it wouldn't be long before the Circuit de Spa-Francorchamps would prove to be a greater threat, even to the best teams and drivers in the race.

A number of privateers entries would fall out of contention early into the race, but then, the factory efforts and the bigger privateers began to run into trouble. Roger Laurent and Jacques Swaters would retire their C-Type with a blown engine. Fangio and Sanesi would be out following an accident in their Alfa Romeo 6C. The Ferrari pairing of Maglioli and Carini would be amongst the casualties with value troubles. It did not get any easier for the top drivers as even Ascari and Villoresi would retire with clutch failure.

Although two of the three works Ferraris had retired during the race, Scuderia victory was never seriously threatened. After Fangio/Sanesi accident after only 22 laps, the Ferrari was without any close competition. Farina and Hawthorn would remain in the lead throughout the whole race, even when the rain came late on in the race. At the finish, Farina and Hawthorn had an 18 lap advantage over the Jaguar C-Type of the Scottish Ecurie Ecosse. In the end, the Ferrari margin of victory amounted to about an advantage of close to 90 minutes over James Scott Douglas and Guy Gale. A Belgian-entered Jaguar C-Type of Herman Roosdorp and Toni Ulmen was a further eleven laps down and finished third. In the touring car class, the Portuguese driver Viegas Vellagao and his Belgian co-driver, Vladimir Narichkine were victorious in their Mercedes-Benz 220. However, although they were fifth overall, they were 68 laps behind the winning Ferrari. The winning partnership, won in a time of 24hr 02:07.085mins., averaging a speed of 94.910 mph. They covered a distance of 2,281.182 miles.

== Official Classification ==
Class Winners are in Bold text.

Pos	No	Class	Driver		Entrant	Chassis	Laps	Reason Out
1st	**8**	**S**	(Italy) **Giuseppe Farina**	(United Kingdom) **Mike Hawthorn**	**Scuderia Ferrari**	**Ferrari 375 MM**	**260**	
2nd	19	S	(United Kingdom) James Scott Douglas	(United Kingdom) Guy Gale	Ecurie Ecosse	Jaguar C-Type	242	
3rd	18	S	(Belgium) Herman Roosdorp	(Germany) Toni Ulmen	Herman Roosdorp	Jaguar C-Type	231	
DNF	6	S	(Italy) Luigi Villoresi	(Italy) Alberto Ascari	Scuderia Ferrari	Ferrari 375 MM	216	Clutch
4th	32	S	(France) Marc Gignoux	(France) Claude Storez	Deutsch et Bonnet	D.B. HBR Panhard	211	
5th	**38**	**T**	**(Portugal) Viegas Vallagao**	**(Belgium) Vladimir Narichkine**		**Mercedes-Benz 220**	**192**	
6th	51	T	(France) Marcel Lauga	(France) G. Averseng		Simca Aronde	191	
7th	49	T	(Belgium) Luc Mahy	(Belgium) Jean-Pierre de Nauville		Peugeot 203	189	
8th	44	T	(Belgium) André Pilette	(Belgium) Jacques de Wetter		Borgward Hansa 1800	188	
9th	57	T	(Belgium) Roger Meunier	(Belgium) Guy Sanders		Panhard Dyna	187	
10th	34	S	(France) René Philippe Faure	(France) Pierre Quetelart	Deutsch et Bonnet	D.B. HBR Panhard	186	
11th	33	S	(France) Reggie Bovens	(France) Roger Giraud	Automobiles Panhard et Levassor	Panhard X85	184	
12th	48	T	(Belgium) Télesphore George	(Belgium) Fernand George		Peugeot 203	184	
13th	62	S	(France) René Cotton	(France) Fernand Sigrand		Panhard Dyna	180	
14th	53	T	(Belgium) Pauwels	(Belgium) André Milhoux		Fiat 1100	176	
15th	55	T	(Belgium) Robert Reip	(Belgium) Louis Richard		Fiat 1100	176	
16th	54	T	(Belgium) Gilberte Thirion	(Belgium) Annie Bousquet		Fiat 1100	175	
17th	43	T	(Belgium) Pierre Slosse	(Belgium) Georges Berger		Borgward Hansa 1800	157	
18th	52	T	(Belgium) Pierre Stasse	(Belgium) Walter Deutsch		Fiat 1100	138	
NC	61	T	(France) Raymond Meignen	(France) Jacques Blanchet		Panhard Dyna	125	
DNF	20	S	(United Kingdom) Tom Meyes	(United Kingdom) Philip Fotheringham-Parker	Tom Meyer	Aston Martin DB3 Coupé	81	Clutch
DNF	15	S	(Argentina) Juan Manuel Fangio	(Italy) Consalvo Sanesi	SpA Alfa Romeo	Alfa Romeo 6C 3000 CM	22	Accident
DNF	4	S	(Belgium) C. Nias	(Belgium) A. Brancart		Talbot Oblin		DNF
DNF	9	S	(Italy) Umberto Maglioli	(Italy) Piero Carini	Scuderia Ferrari	Ferrari 375 MM		Value
DNF	17	S	(Belgium) Roger Laurent	(Belgium) Jacques Swaters	Ecurie Francorchamps	Jaguar C-Type		Engine
DNF	22	S	(Belgium) Charles de Tornaco	(Luxembourg) Onore Wagner	Ecurie Francorchamps	Ferrari 212 Export		Engine
DNF	24	S	(France) Jean Ampoulié	(France) Jacques Gergaud		Ford Siam Special		Engine
DISQ	26	S	(France) Elyane Imbert	(France) Simone des Forest		Porsche 356 1500 Super		Disqualified
DNF	29	S	(Belgium) Paul Frère	(Germany) Walter Hampel		Porsche 356		Gearbox
DNF	35	S	(France) Georges Guyot	(France) “Reverse”	Deutsch et Bonnet	D.B. HBR Panhard		Accident
DNF	36	S	(France) Louis Pons	(France) Jean Rédélé	R.N.U. Renault	Renault 4CV/1063		Engine
DNF	40	T	(Luxembourg) “Radrizzi”	(Luxembourg) “Tissot”		Fiat 1900		DNF
DNF	41	T	(Belgium) Max Thirion	(Italy) Mario Damonte	SpA Alfa Romeo	Alfa Romeo 1900		Electrics
DNF	43	T	(Belgium) Boy Laloux	(Belgium) Georges Berger		Borgward Hansa 1800		Accident
DNF	46	T	(United Kingdom) Barry Leavens	(United Kingdom) Joyce Leavens		Jowett Javelin		Accident
DISQ	50	T	(Belgium) “Eldé”	(Belgium) Claude Collard		Peugeot 203		Outside Assistance;Lost Wheel
DNF	58	T	(Belgium) Roland du Roy de Blicky	(Belgium) Olivier Gendebien		Panhard Dyna		DNF
DNF	59	T	(Belgium) Gert Welter	(Belgium) “Renant”		Panhard Dyna		Accident
DNF	60	T	(France) “de la Bourdonnaye”	(France) “Vandenberg”		Panhard Dyna		DNF
DNS		T	(Belgium) “Thillios”	(Belgium) Johnny Claes		Fiat 1100		Accident

- Fastest Lap: Giuseppe Farina, 4:44.0secs (111.217 mph)

=== Class Winners ===
Class	Winners		
Sports	8	Ferrari 375 MM	Farina / Hawthorn
Touring	38	Mercedes-Benz 220	Vallagao / Narichkine

== Standings after the race ==
Pos	Championship	Points
1	(Italy) Ferrari	19
2	(United Kingdom) Jaguar	18
3	(United States) Cunningham	12
4	(United Kingdom) Aston Martin	8
5	(Italy) Alfa Romeo	6

- Note: Only the top five positions are included in this set of standings.

Championship points were awarded for the first six places in each race in the order of 8-6-4-3-2-1. Manufacturers were only awarded points for their highest finishing car with no points awarded for positions filled by additional cars. Only the best 4 results out of the 7 races could be retained by each manufacturer. Points earned but not counted towards the championship totals are listed within brackets in the above table.

World Sportscar Championship
Previous race: 24 Hours of Le Mans	1953 season	Next race: 1000km Nürburgring
