= James Scott Douglas =

British racing driver and baronet

- Nationality: (United Kingdom) British
- Born: 24 October 1930; Malmesbury, Wiltshire, England
- Died: 16 July 1969 (aged 38); Cheshire, England

Sir James Louis Fitzroy Scott Douglas, 6th Baronet (24 October 1930 – 16 July 1969) was a British racing driver and a baronet.

== Early life and baronetcy ==
He was born in Malmesbury, Wiltshire. He succeeded his great uncle, Sir George Brisbane Scott Douglas, the 5th Baronet, who died in 1935 unmarried and without heirs, to the title 6th Baronet Douglas, of Springwood Park. James never resided at the family home of five generations, Springwood Park, near Kelso, Scottish Borders.

He was educated at Wellington College, Berkshire, before serving with the 15th/19th The King's Royal Hussars, where he gained the rank of 2nd Lieutenant. He gained the rank of Lieutenant whilst serving with the Lothians and Border Horse.

== Racing driver ==
James was a competent racing driver mainly between 1952 and 1954, but suffered from a congenital disorder, which made it difficult for him to keep his weight down. Despite that, he raced in 1952 for Ecurie Ecosse in his own Jaguar XK120, recording a number of good results, including a third place in the Grand Prix de Reims and a sixth place in the British Empire Trophy.

When the team switched to Jaguar C-Types, Scott Douglas needed to obtain one to remain at Ecurie Ecosse. However, all UK orders had been taken up, so he used his influence and brought an ‘export’ version from France for the 1953 season. He used this car to score his only victory, an unlimited national event at Castle Combe, as well as his greatest racing achievement, when partnered by Guy Gale, he finished second in the 24 Heures de Spa Francorchamps.

During the 1954 season, it became clear to James, that he was spending his inheritance too quickly, so he decided to move to Argentina and become a farmer. After he was left another inheritance, he returned to Britain to resume his hedonistic lifestyle. By now, he had tired of motor sport, and sold his C-Type and retired from racing. After spending his second inheritance, he worked for the Daily Express newspaper selling advertising space, and auctioned the contents of Springwood Park, leaving the house to decay until it was demolished.

== Death ==
Sir James Louis Fitzroy Scott Douglas died at the age of 38 in Bucklow, Cheshire. Upon his death, his baronetcy became extinct.

== Racing record ==
=== Career highlights ===
Season	Series	Position	Team	Car
1952	GP Reims	3rd	Ecurie Ecosse	Jaguar XK120
	Wakefield Trophy	3rd		Jaguar XK120
1953	24 Heures de Spa Francorchamps	2nd	Ecurie Ecosse	Jaguar C-Type
1954	Zandvoort International	2nd	Ecurie Ecosse	Jaguar C-Type

=== Complete 24 Hours of Spa results ===
Year	Team	Co-Drivers	Car	Class	Laps	Pos.	Class Pos.
1953	(United Kingdom) Ecurie Ecosse	(United Kingdom) Guy Gale	Jaguar C-Type	S	242	2nd	2nd

=== Complete 12 Hours of Reims results ===
Year	Team	Co-Drivers	Car	Class	Pos.	Class Pos.
1953	(United Kingdom) Ecurie Ecosse	(United Kingdom) Ninian Sanderson	Jaguar C-Type	S+2..0	2nd	2nd

Baronetage of Great Britain
Preceded by George Brisbane Scott Douglas	Baronet (of Maxwell); 1935–1969	Extinct
