= Lord Lieutenant of Selkirkshire =

Ceremonial officer in Selkirkshire, Scotland

This is a list of people, who have served as Lord Lieutenant of Selkirkshire. The office was replaced by the Lord Lieutenant of Roxburgh, Ettrick and Lauderdale in 1975.

- Charles Montagu-Scott, Earl of Dalkeith 17 March 1794 – 1797
- Francis Napier, 8th Lord Napier 17 November 1797 – 1 August 1823
- Henry Montagu-Scott, 2nd Baron Montagu of Boughton 25 August 1823 – 30 October 1845
- Henry Hepburne-Scott, 7th Lord Polwarth 5 December 1845 – 16 August 1867
- Allan Eliott-Lockhart 15 November 1867 – 15 March 1878
- Walter Hepburne-Scott, 8th Lord Polwarth 2 May 1878 – 1920
- Maj. Charles Henry Scott Plummer 6 June 1920 – 26 June 1948
- Sir Samuel Strang Steel, 1st Baronet 13 September 1948 – 1958
- V-Adm. Sir Edward Michael Conolly Abel Smith 15 February 1958 – 1975
- Walter Montagu-Douglas-Scott, 9th Duke of Buccleuch 16 March 1975 – 1975
- Buccleuch became Lord Lieutenant of Roxburgh, Ettrick and Lauderdale
