= George Henry Scott-Douglas =

George Henry Scott-Douglas MP

Member of Parliament for Roxburghshire
- In office 16 February 1874 – 10 April 1880
- Preceded by: James Innes-Ker
- Succeeded by: Arthur Elliot

Personal details
- Born: 19 June 1825 Edinburgh, Scotland
- Died: 26 June 1885 (aged 60)
- Party: Conservative
- Spouse: Mariquita Juana Petronilla (m. 1851)
- Children: Six, including: George Brisbane Scott Douglas
- Parent(s): John James Scott-Douglas; Hannah Charlotte Scott
- Education: Harrow School

Sir George Henry Scott-Douglas, 4th Baronet (19 June 1825 – 26 June 1885) was a Conservative Party politician and soldier.

== Military career ==
During his life, he was a captain of the 34th Regiment of Foot from 1843 to 1851 where he was stationed at Athlone, Ireland, and Corfu. He was also Lieutenant-Colonel of the Roxburgh and Selkirk Rifle Volunteers from 1868 to 1885, and Brigadier General of the Royal Company of Archers.

== Political career ==
Harris was elected MP for Roxburghshire in 1874, but lost the seat at the next election in 1880.

== Baronetcy ==
In 1836, upon the death of his father, John James Scott-Douglas, he succeeded as fourth baronet. Upon his death, the title passed to his second son, George Brisbane Scott Douglas.

== Family ==
Scott-Douglas met his wife, Mariquita, who was the eldest daughter of Don Francisco Serran Sanches de Piña, in Gibraltar, and they were married in 1851. Together they had six children, one of whom died in infancy. Their eldest son, James, was due to receive the baronetcy on Scott-Douglas' death; however, on 3 July 1879, while on tour in Zululand, he was killed.

Parliament of the United Kingdom
Preceded by James Innes-Ker	Member of Parliament for Roxburghshire; 1874–1880	Succeeded by Arthur Elliot
Baronetage of Great Britain
Preceded by John James Scott-Douglas	Baronet (of Maxwell); 1836–1885	Succeeded by George Brisbane Scott Douglas
