= Roxburghshire (UK Parliament constituency) =

Parliamentary constituency

- Former county constituency for the House of Commons
- Subdivision: Roxburghshire

1708–1918
- Seats: One
- Created from: Roxburghshire
- Replaced by: Roxburgh and Selkirk

Roxburghshire was a Scottish county constituency of the House of Commons of the Parliament of Great Britain (at Westminster) from 1708 to 1801, and of the Parliament of the United Kingdom (also at Westminster) from 1801 to 1918.

== Creation ==
The British parliamentary constituency was created in 1708 following the Acts of Union, 1707 and replaced the former Parliament of Scotland shire constituency of Roxburghshire.

== Boundaries ==
The name relates the constituency to the county of Roxburgh.

== History ==
The constituency elected one Member of Parliament (MP) by the first past the post system until the seat was abolished in 1918.

When the constituency was abolished in 1918, the Roxburgh and Selkirk constituency was created, covering the counties of Roxburgh and Selkirk

== Members of Parliament ==
Election	Member	Party
1708	Sir Gilbert Eliott, 3rd Bt	
1715	William Douglas	
1722	Sir Gilbert Elliot, 2nd Bt	
1726	Sir Gilbert Eliott, 3rd Bt	
1727	William Douglas	
1734	John Rutherfurd	
1742	William Douglas	
1747	Walter Scott	
1765	Sir Gilbert Elliot	
1777	Sir Gilbert Elliot	
1784	Sir George Douglas	Whig
1806	John Rutherfurd	
1812	Gilbert Elliot-Murray-Kynynmound	
1814	Sir Alexander Don	
1826	Henry Hepburne-Scott	Tory
1832	George Elliot	Whig
1835	Lord John Scott	Conservative
1837	John Elliot	Whig
1841	Francis Scott	Conservative
1847	John Elliot	Whig
1859	Sir William Scott, Bt	Liberal
1870	James Innes-Ker	Liberal
1874	Sir George Scott-Douglas	Conservative
1880	Arthur Elliot	Liberal
1886	Arthur Elliot	Liberal Unionist
1892	Mark Napier	Liberal
1895	The Earl of Dalkeith	Conservative
1906	John Jardine	Liberal
1918	constituency abolished	

== Election results ==
=== Elections in the 1830s ===
General election 1830: Roxburghshire
Party	Candidate	Votes	%
Tory	Henry Hepburne-Scott	Unopposed	
Registered electors		151	
Tory hold			

General election 1831: Roxburghshire
Party	Candidate	Votes	%
Tory	Henry Hepburne-Scott	57	80.3
Whig	Sir William Francis Eliott, 7th Baronet	14	19.7
Majority		43	60.6
Turnout		71	47.0
Registered electors		151	
Tory hold			

General election 1832: Roxburghshire
Party	Candidate	Votes	%	±%
Whig	George Elliot	624	53.4	N/A
Tory	John Douglas-Montagu-Scott	532	45.5	−34.8
Whig	Sir William Francis Eliott, 7th Baronet	12	1.0	−18.7
Majority		92	7.9	N/A
Turnout		1,168	88.4	+41.4
Registered electors		1,321		
Whig gain from Tory		Swing		

General election 1835: Roxburghshire
Party	Candidate	Votes	%	±%
Conservative	John Douglas-Montagu-Scott	757	52.6	+7.1
Whig	George Elliot	681	47.4	−6.0
Majority		76	5.2	N/A
Turnout		1,438	85.9	−2.5
Registered electors		1,674		
Conservative gain from Whig		Swing	+6.6	

General election 1837: Roxburghshire
Party	Candidate	Votes	%	±%
Whig	John Elliot	803	51.4	+4.0
Conservative	Francis Scott	759	48.6	−4.0
Majority		44	2.8	N/A
Turnout		1,562	80.8	−5.1
Registered electors		1,932		
Whig gain from Conservative		Swing	+4.0	

=== Elections in the 1840s ===
General election 1841: Roxburghshire
Party	Candidate	Votes	%	±%
Conservative	Francis Scott	830	52.6	+4.0
Whig	John Elliot	748	47.4	−4.0
Majority		82	5.2	N/A
Turnout		1,578	69.3	−11.5
Registered electors		2,277		
Conservative gain from Whig		Swing	+4.0	

General election 1847: Roxburghshire
Party	Candidate	Votes	%	±%
Whig	John Elliot	Unopposed		
Registered electors		2,091		
Whig gain from Conservative				

=== Elections in the 1850s ===
General election 1852: Roxburghshire
Party	Candidate	Votes	%	±%
Whig	John Elliot	Unopposed		
Registered electors		2,033		
Whig hold				

General election 1857: Roxburghshire
Party	Candidate	Votes	%	±%
Whig	John Elliot	Unopposed		
Registered electors		1,650		
Whig hold				

General election 1859: Roxburghshire
Party	Candidate	Votes	%	±%
Liberal	William Scott	Unopposed		
Registered electors		1,663		
Liberal hold				

=== Elections in the 1860s ===
General election 1865: Roxburghshire
Party	Candidate	Votes	%	±%
Liberal	William Scott	Unopposed		
Registered electors		1,639		
Liberal hold				

General election 1868: Roxburghshire
Party	Candidate	Votes	%	±%
Liberal	William Scott	750	55.1	N/A
Conservative	Schomberg Kerr	610	44.9	New
Majority		140	10.2	N/A
Turnout		1,360	81.7	N/A
Registered electors		1,664		
Liberal hold				

=== Elections in the 1870s ===
Scott resigned, causing a by-election.

By-election, 2 Mar 1870: Roxburghshire
Party	Candidate	Votes	%	±%
Liberal	James Innes-Ker	Unopposed		
Liberal hold				

General election 1874: Roxburghshire
Party	Candidate	Votes	%	±%
Conservative	George Henry Scott-Douglas	789	50.9	+6.0
Liberal	James Innes-Ker	762	49.1	−6.0
Majority		27	1.8	N/A
Turnout		1,551	85.5	+3.8
Registered electors		1,813		
Conservative gain from Liberal		Swing		

=== Elections in the 1880s ===
General election 1880: Roxburghshire
Party	Candidate	Votes	%	±%
Liberal	Arthur Elliot	859	50.3	+1.2
Conservative	George Henry Scott-Douglas	849	49.7	−1.2
Majority		10	0.6	N/A
Turnout		1,708	86.3	+0.8
Registered electors		1,978		
Liberal gain from Conservative		Swing	+1.2	

General election 1885: Roxburghshire
Party	Candidate	Votes	%	±%
Liberal	Arthur Elliot	3,419	63.6	+13.3
Conservative	Charles Balfour	1,954	36.4	−13.3
Majority		1,465	27.2	+26.6
Turnout		5,373	86.9	+0.6
Registered electors		6,180		
Liberal hold		Swing	+13.3	

General election 1886: Roxburghshire
Party	Candidate	Votes	%	±%
Liberal Unionist	Arthur Elliot	2,570	54.5	+18.1
Liberal	Mark Francis Napier	2,142	45.5	−18.1
Majority		428	9.0	N/A
Turnout		4,712	76.2	−10.7
Registered electors		6,180		
Liberal Unionist gain from Liberal		Swing	+18.1	

=== Elections in the 1890s ===
General election 1892: Roxburghshire
Party	Candidate	Votes	%	±%
Liberal	Mark Francis Napier	2,672	51.5	+6.0
Liberal Unionist	Arthur Elliot	2,514	48.5	−6.0
Majority		158	3.0	N/A
Turnout		5,186	86.2	+10.0
Registered electors		6,015		
Liberal gain from Liberal Unionist		Swing	+6.0	

General election 1895: Roxburghshire
Party	Candidate	Votes	%	±%
Conservative	John Scott	2,929	55.3	+6.8
Liberal	Mark Francis Napier	2,368	44.7	−6.8
Majority		561	10.6	N/A
Turnout		5,297	88.5	+2.3
Registered electors		5,988		
Conservative gain from Liberal		Swing	+6.8	

=== Elections in the 1900s ===
General election 1900: Roxburghshire
Party	Candidate	Votes	%	±%
Conservative	John Scott	2,682	53.6	−1.7
Liberal	John Jardine	2,323	46.4	+1.7
Majority		359	7.2	−3.4
Turnout		5,005	84.4	−4.1
Registered electors		5,931		
Conservative hold		Swing	−1.7	

General election 1906: Roxburghshire
Party	Candidate	Votes	%	±%
Liberal	John Jardine	2,829	52.9	+6.5
Conservative	Richard John Waldie-Griffith	2,514	47.1	−6.5
Majority		315	5.8	N/A
Turnout		5,343	90.8	+6.4
Registered electors		5,884		
Liberal gain from Conservative		Swing	+6.5	

=== Elections in the 1910s ===
General election January 1910: Roxburghshire
Party	Candidate	Votes	%	±%
Liberal	John Jardine	2,943	52.8	−0.1
Conservative	Henry Francis Douglas-Scott-Montagu, 1st Baron Montagu of Beaulieu	2,626	47.2	+0.1
Majority		317	5.6	−0.2
Turnout		5,569	92.4	+1.6
Registered electors		6,025		
Liberal hold		Swing	−0.1	

General election December 1910: Roxburghshire
Party	Candidate	Votes	%	±%
Liberal	John Jardine	2,908	51.8	−1.0
Conservative	Neil James Kennedy Cochran-Patrick	2,704	48.2	+1.0
Majority		204	3.6	−2.0
Turnout		5,612	91.8	−0.6
Registered electors		6,114		
Liberal hold		Swing	−1.0	
