= Henry Hepburne-Scott, 7th Lord Polwarth =

British politician

Henry Francis Hepburne-Scott, 7th Lord Polwarth (1 January 1800 – 16 August 1867) was firstly a Member of the Parliament of the United Kingdom for Roxburghshire, 1826–32, then a Scottish representative peer in the House of Lords at Westminster. He was Lord Lieutenant and Sheriff Principal of Selkirkshire, and a Lord-in-Waiting to Queen Victoria.

His father, Hugh Scott of Harden and Mertoun, had entered the House of Lords following his claim, by right of his mother, for the 1690 Scottish peerage of Lord Polwarth being admitted by them in July 1835. Henry assumed the additional surname of Hepburne in consequence of the estates of the Hepburns of Humbie having descended to him, through his great-great-grandmother, Helen Hepburn, Countess of Tarras.

Harriet Brühl, the mother of the 7th Lord Polwarth, was the daughter of Alicia, Dowager Countess of Egremont, through her second marriage to Count Hans Moritz von Brühl.

The 7th Lord Polwarth married, on 28 December 1841, Georgina (1816–1859), sister of George Baillie-Hamilton, 10th Earl of Haddington and third daughter of George Baillie of Mellerstain House and Jerviswood by his spouse Mary, youngest daughter of Sir James Pringle, 4th Baronet. They left children.

Parliament of the United Kingdom
Preceded by Sir Alexander Don	Member of Parliament for Roxburghshire; 1826–1832	Succeeded by George Elliott
Honorary titles
Preceded by The Lord Montagu of Boughton	Lord Lieutenant of Selkirkshire; 1845–1867	Succeeded by Alan Eliott-Lockhart
Peerage of Scotland
Preceded by Hugh Scott	Lord Polwarth; 1847–1867	Succeeded by Walter Hepburne-Scott
