= Alicia Ann Spottiswoode =

Scottish songwriter and composer

Alicia Anne Scott
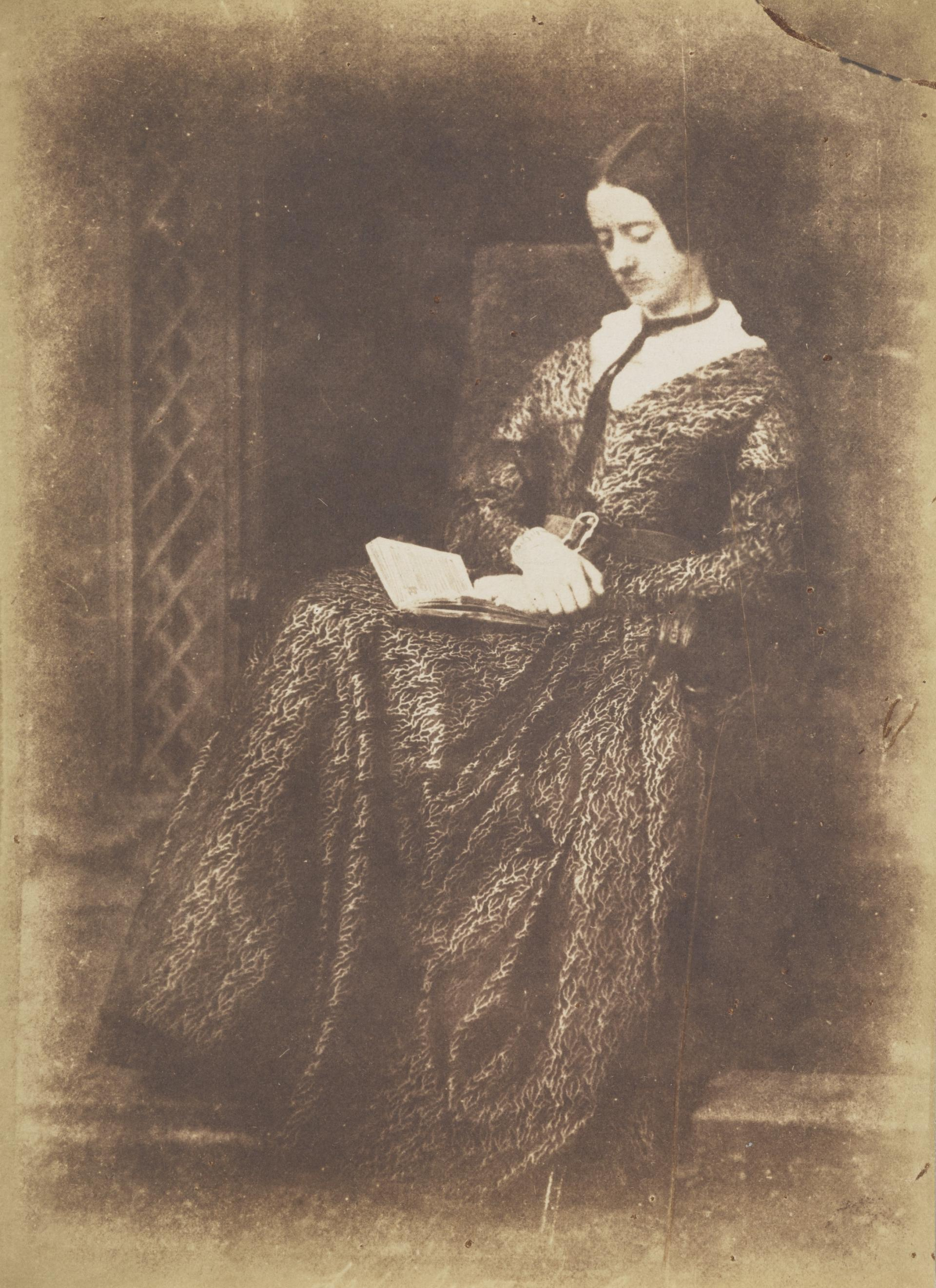
- Portrait of Lady John Scott in the 1840s
- Born: 1810; Spottiswoode, Berwickshire
- Died: 12 March 1900 (aged 89–90); Spottiswoode
- Burial place: Westruther Kirk
- Other name: Alicia Anne Spottiswoode Lady John Scott
- Known for: Poet and composer, first Lady Associate of the Society of Antiquaries of Scotland
- Notable work: "Annie Laurie"

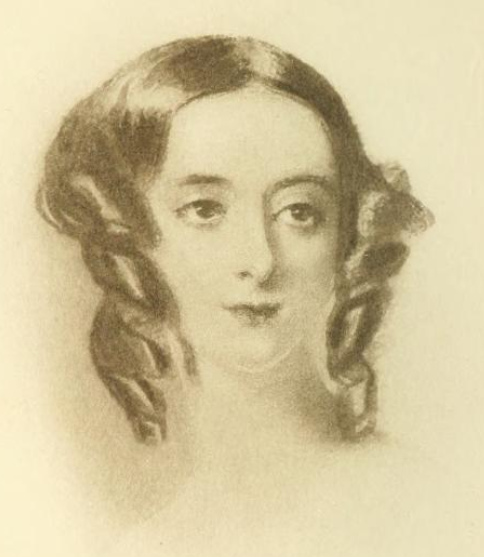
Lady John Scott

Alicia Ann, Lady John Scott (née Spottiswoode; 24 June 1810 – 12 March 1900) was a Scottish songwriter and composer known chiefly for the tune, "Annie Laurie," to which the words of a 17th-century poet, William Douglas, were set. She was passionate about preserving Scottish heritage, and was the first Lady Fellow of the Society of Antiquaries of Scotland.

== Personal life ==
Scott was born at Spottiswoode, Scottish Borders, in the former Berwickshire. She was the oldest daughter of John Spottiswoode of Berwickshire and his wife Helen Wauchope of Niddrie Marischal. She had three siblings, two brothers called John and Andrew and a sister, Margaret, to whom she was particularly devoted. The four children were close in age and were close companions. Alicia and Andrew were much bolder than John and Margaret, and thus acted as leaders of the group. Together they were adventurous; they were confident horseback riders, and would often gallop over the moors. They often joined their neighbour, Lord Lauderdale, in coursing hares.

Occasionally the children would be taken to their mother's former home in Niddrie. While there they would speak to her grandfather, a passionate Jacobite who would tell the children stories about the Jacobite rising of 1745. Scott was fascinated by these stories, and they stuck with her throughout her life.

Much of her childhood was spent in the countryside, where she was educated in Italian, French, drawing, literature, singing, and playing the harp. She inherited her father's interest in geology, botany and archaeology, and her grandfather's interest in Scottish history - being interested in the Jacobites in particular.

Scott was a champion of traditional Scots language, history and culture, her motto being 'Haud [hold] fast by the past'. Scott also regularly communicated with Scottish antiquary and folklorist Charles Kirkpatrick Sharpe during the 1840's, evidencing her interest in Scottish culture, history and folklore.

On 16 March 1836 she married Lord John Scott, a younger son of the 4th Duke of Buccleuch, and consequently become known as Lady John Scott. Together they lived at his estate in Cawston, Warwickshire.

In 1839 Scott's sister, Margaret, died. She had never been particularly strong, and had developed a "great delicacy of chest," and was told to winter abroad for her health. On her way to Italy in the winter of 1839, she and Sir Hugh stopped in Paris. Unbeknownst to them, the previous tenant of the room they stayed in had scarlet fever. Margaret caught it, and died a few days later. Scott received the news of her sister's illness and death almost simultaneously. This was deeply shocking to Scott, and she was deeply affected by her sister's passing.

In 1846 her eldest brother died of consumption.

On Christmas day in 1859 Scott was waiting for Lord John to join her from Cawston. However, his health had very suddenly declined, and she was quickly summoned. She arrived only a day or two before his death.

Later in her life, and especially after Lord John's death, she grew increasingly withdrawn, only interacting with loved ones. Before Lord John's death, when Scott was travelling she would write letters to him in her journal. During his life these letters were never sent, and after his death she continued this practice of writing to him. At Cawston she left his cane and hats in the hall where they had been kept while he was alive, and she kept his dressing room exactly as he had left it. His dressing room was only altered once the upper story was later remodelled.

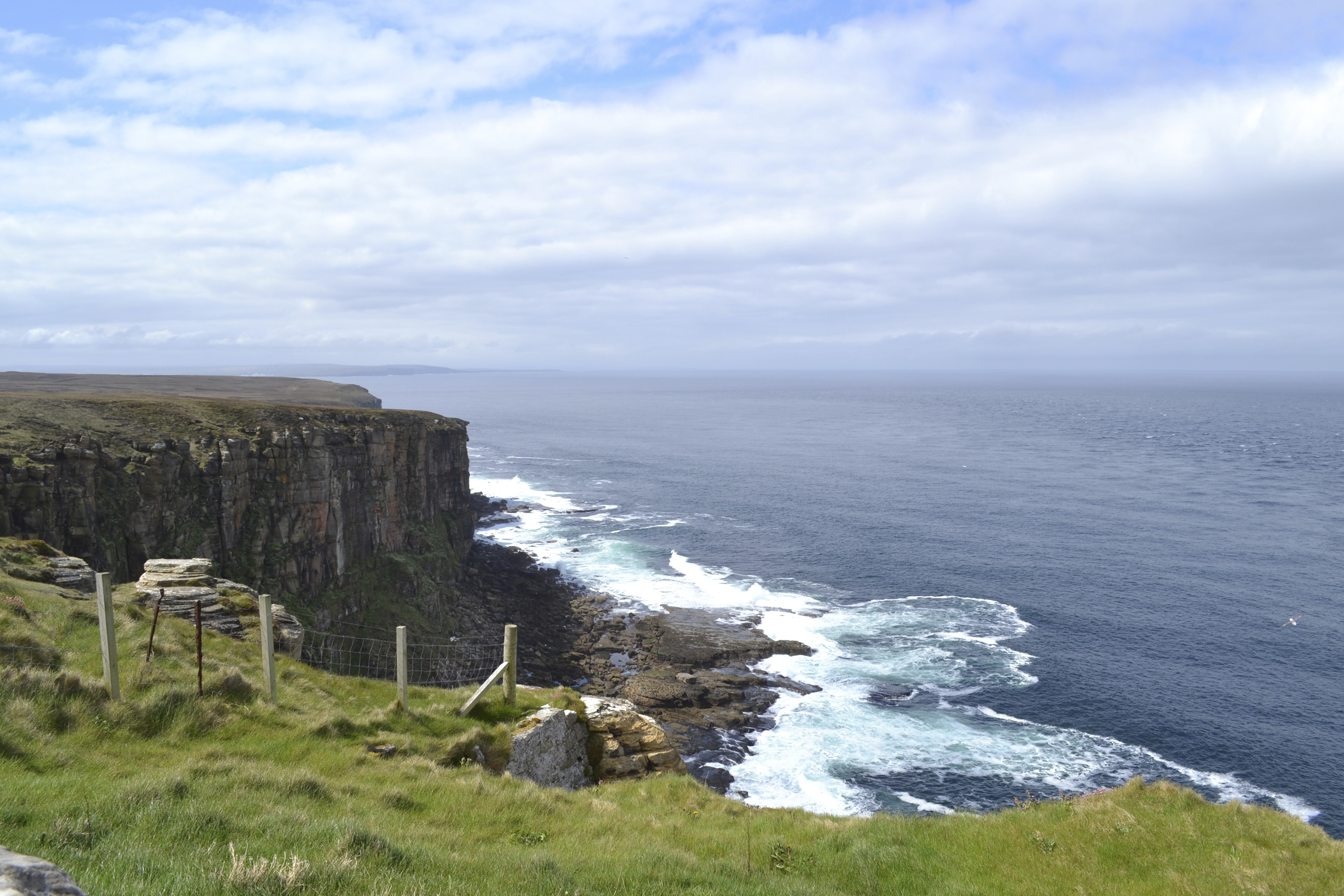
The view from along the coast at Dunnet Head

In 1870 her mother passed away. Every year after her mother's death Scott would go to Thurso in the summer. She found the seaside air beneficial, and loved swimming in the Pentland Firth. She would draw while on these trips, and "every ssummer her sketch-books were filled with fresh views of Scrabster, Dunnet Head, and Sinclair Bay." There are many prehistoric remains in Caithness, and she would explore these. She went from Thurso to Orkney many times, and went from Thurso to Shetland twice.

The spring of 1900 was very cold, and at the beginning of March an influenza outbreak spread through Spottiswoode. Scott was not strong enough to fight off the infection, and she was sick for only a few days. She died at Spottiswoode, in the Borders, on 12 March 1900. On her burial, George G. Napier published a short book, titled The Burial of Lady John Scott, Authoress of “Annie Laurie”, 16th March 1900.

== Archaeology ==
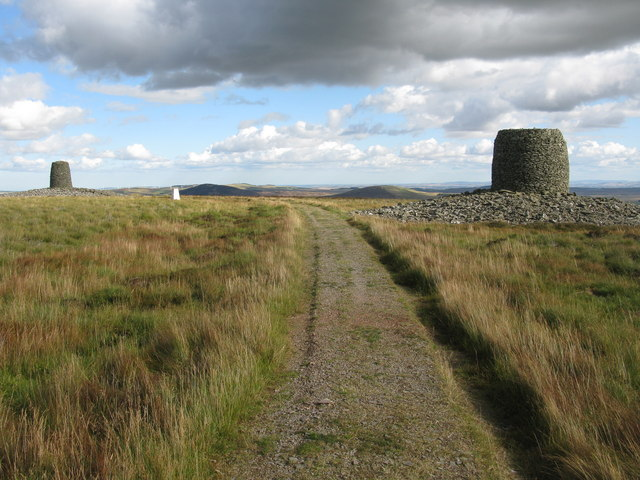
The Twinlaw Cairns

Scott was an avid collector of local artefacts such as ceramics, flint arrowheads, and bronze axes and spearheads. She would frequently purchase these artefacts from the locals who found them, which resulted in many items that would otherwise have been discarded being preserved. She displayed her collection in the Eagle Hall.

During nineteenth century archaeology was a popular pastime for women of means, some of whom, including Scott, became pioneers in the field. In 1845 she directed the excavations of the Twinlaw cairns. She recorded that they "opened the Twinlaw Cairns and found a cist (which had been ransacked before) in each."

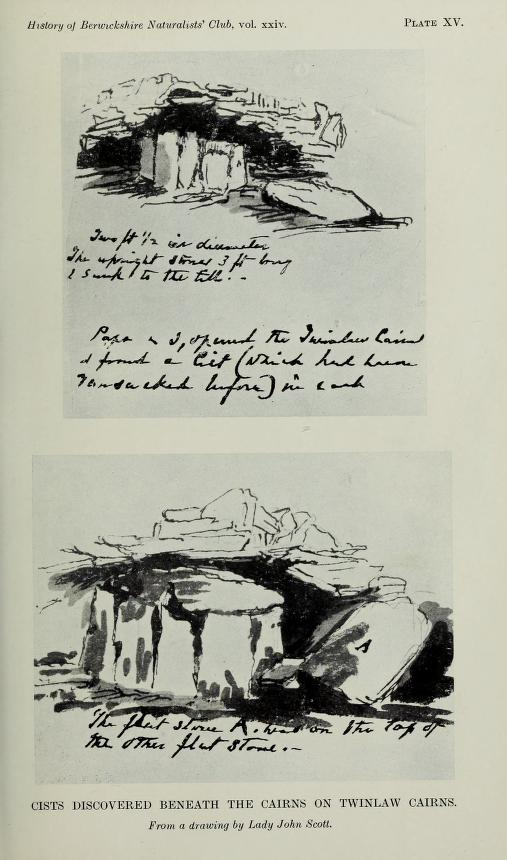
Lady John Scott's illustrations of the cists discovered beneath the Twinlaw cairns, published in the History of Berwickshire Naturalists' Club

In 1863 Scott oversaw excavations on two barrows on the Spottiswoode estate, and the subsequent paper was published in Volume 5 of the Proceedings of the Society of Antiquaries of Scotland as "communicated by Professor JY Simpson." The artefacts found during excavations are now in the collections of the National Museums of Scotland.

In Volume 6 of the Proceedings of the Society of Antiquaries of Scotland a report on an excavation of the tumuli at Hartlaw was published by John Stuart. He reported that the excavation was directed by Scott, who was assisted by a Mrs. Warrender.

Lord John Scott died in 1900. Under the will of her father, she resumed her maiden name Spottiswoode in 1866, and was sometimes known as Lady John Scott Spottiswoode.

In 1868 the Society of Antiquaries of Scotland began to discuss the admission of women as members, as several archaeological societies in England had begun to admit them as well. The Society established its first official membership category for women, then known as Lady Associate. Lady John Scott was admitted as the first Lady Associate in 1870. Lady Associates were honorary members of the Society. The number of Lady Associates permitted in the Society was limited to twenty five at a time. Lady Associates did not pay member fees and were allowed to submit communications to be read at meetings by male Fellows, although not permitted to attend said meetings in person.

Scott was a champion of traditional Scots language, history and culture, her motto being 'Haud [hold] fast by the past'. Scott also regularly communicated with Scottish antiquary and folklorist Charles Kirkpatrick Sharpe during the 1840's, evidencing her interest in Scottish culture, history and folklore.

== Music ==
Scott's fascination with the past began in her childhood. She would collect and record the traditional songs and stories that she was told. She made a conscious effort to preserve old customs and practices throughout her life. Poetry was an important outlet for her, especially later in her life.

One of her best known works, "Annie Laurie," was written whilst visiting her sister and brother-in-law in Marchmont, and was published in 1838. Years after writing "Annie Laurie" she recounted to a friend that "I made the tune very long ago to an absurd ballad, originally Norwegian, I believe, called 'Kempie Kaye,' and once, before I was married, I was staying at Marchmount, and fell in with a collection of Allan Cuningham's poetry. I took a fancy to the words of 'Annie Laurie,' and thought they would go well to the tune I speak of. I didn't quite like the words, however, and I altered the verse, 'she backit like a peacock,' to what it is now, and made the third verse ('like dew on the gowan lying') myself, only for my own amusement; but I was singing it, and Hugh Campbell and my sister liked it, and I accordingly wrote it down for them."

Scott occasionally printed her songs for charity. For example, after the Crimean War she gave "Annie Laurie" and several other songs to Lonsdale to publish and sell at "bazaar for the widows and orphans of soldiers who had been killed."

Most of her songs were recorded in her own manuscripts, occasionally gifting them to loved ones. She copied a set for the late Lord Napier, who had been a lifelong friend of hers. She also copied an extensive collection of old Scottish songs for her brother in law, which is likely the most complete collection of her work.

Her compositions were published by Paterson & Roy, and included:

== Works ==
Selected works include:

- “Annie Laurie”
- “Douglas Tender and True”
- “Durisdeer”
- “Etterick”
- “Farewell to Thee”
- “Foul Fords”
- “Katherine Logie”
- “Lammermoor”
- “Loch Lomond”
- “Mother, Oh Sing Me to Rest”
- “Shame on Ye, Gallants”
- "Think on Me"
- “When We First Rode Down to Ettrick”
- “Within the Garden of My Heart”
- “Your Voices Are Not Hush'd”

== Selected Publications ==
Stuart, J.; Scott, Lady J. (1865) Account of Graves recently discovered at Hartlaw, on the farm of Westruther Mains, with Drawings by Lady John Scott. Proceedings of the Society of Antiquaries of Scotland, 6, pp. 55–61. doi:10.9750/PSAS.006.55.61.

== See also ==
- List of places in the Scottish Borders
- List of places in Scotland
