= Sir William Scott, 6th Baronet =

Scottish politician

Sir William Scott, 6th Baronet of Ancrum MP FRSE (26 July 1803 – 12 October 1871) was a Scottish politician who sat in the House of Commons from 1829 to 1830 and 1859 to 1870.

== Life ==
Scott was the son of Sir John Scott, 5th Baronet of Ancrum and his wife Harriett Graham, daughter William Graham of Gartmore House, Stirlingshire.

He inherited the baronetcy on the death of his father in 1814. He was educated at the Royal Military College, Sandhurst, and became a lieutenant in the 2nd Battalion Life Guards. He was a Deputy Lieutenant and J.P. for Roxburghshire and a J.P. for Forfarshire. He was a Fellow of the Royal Society of Scotland.

In February 1829, Scott was elected Tory Member of Parliament for Carlisle and held the seat to July 1830. At the 1859 general election Scott was elected MP for Roxburghshire. He had already become a Liberal. He held the seat until 1870.

Scott died at the age of 68.

== Family ==
In 1828 Scott married Elizabeth Anderson, daughter of David Anderson of Balgay House near Dundee, Forfarshire. They had issue, including Henry Warren Scott (1833–1889), Queen Elizabeth The Queen Mother's maternal step-grandfather.

Parliament of the United Kingdom
Preceded by Sir James Graham, Bt; James Law Lushington	Member of Parliament for Carlisle; 1829–1830; With: James Law Lushington	Succeeded by Philip Howard; James Law Lushington
Preceded by John Edmund Elliot	Member of Parliament for Roxburghshire; 1859–1870	Succeeded by James Innes-Ker
Baronetage of Nova Scotia
Preceded by John Scott	Baronet (of Ancrum); 1812–1871	Succeeded by William Monteath Scott
