= Arthur Moore (Royal Navy officer) =

Royal Navy officer

Admiral Sir Arthur Moore GCB GCVO CMG
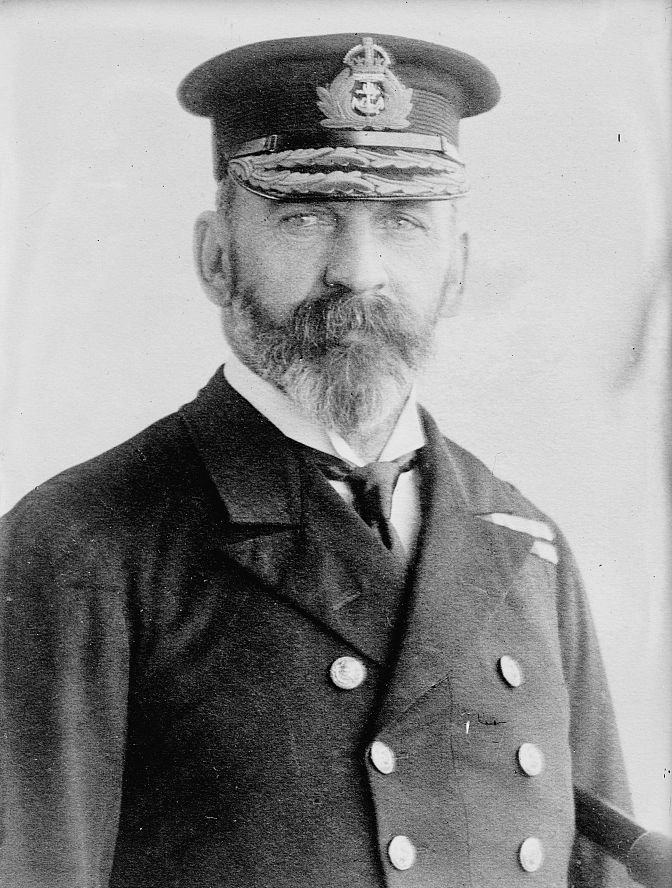
- Sir Arthur Moore
- Born: 30 July 1847; Frittenden, Kent, England
- Died: 3 April 1934 (aged 86)
- Military career
- Allegiance: United Kingdom
- Branch: Royal Navy
- Rank: Admiral
- Commands: HMS Invincible; HMS Orion; HMS Dreadnought; HMS Britannia; Cape of Good Hope Station; China Station; Portsmouth Command
- Conflicts: Second Boer War
- Awards: Knight Grand Cross of the Order of the Bath; Knight Grand Cross of the Royal Victorian Order; Companion of the Order of St Michael and St George

Admiral Sir Arthur William Moore, GCB, GCVO, CMG (30 July 1847 – 3 April 1934) was a Royal Navy officer who became both Commander-in-Chief, China and Commander-in-Chief, Portsmouth.

== Early life ==
Moore was born in 1847 in Frittenden, Kent, the son of the Rev. Edward Moore, rector of the parish, by his marriage to Lady Harriet Montagu-Scott (1814–1870), a daughter of the fourth Duke of Buccleuch. His father was an Honorary Canon of Canterbury, and his great-grandfather was John Moore, Archbishop of Canterbury.

== Military career ==
Moore joined the Royal Navy as a cadet in 1860, at the age of thirteen.

In 1881 he was given command of the battleship HMS Invincible in the Mediterranean Fleet and in 1882 he commanded the corvette HMS Orion in the Anglo-Egyptian War. He was present at the Battle of Tel-el-Kebir. In 1884 he was appointed Flag Captain to the Commander-in-Chief, East Indies.

He later took command of the battleship HMS Dreadnought in the Mediterranean Fleet before becoming Commandant of HMS Britannia at Dartmouth.

In 1889 Moore was sent as a British representative to the Anti-Slavery Congress held in Brussels. In 1890-1891 he was a member of the Australian Defence Committee.

He was made Junior Naval Lord at the Admiralty in 1898, and Commander-in-Chief, Cape of Good Hope and West Coast of Africa Station in early 1901, leaving the UK for Cape in March 1901 on board his flagship HMS Gibraltar. In this capacity he took part in the closing phases of the Second Boer War. Following the end of the war in June 1902, he toured the East Coast of Africa, visiting Zanzibar with seven Royal Navy ships for a show of force following the death of the sultan and the accession of his son in July 1902, and Kenya in August.

In 1905 he became Second in Command in the Channel Fleet and in 1906 he was made Commander-in-Chief, China. His last appointment was as Commander-in-Chief, Portsmouth from 1911; he retired in 1912.

When he died in 1934, Moore was buried with other members of his family at St Mary's Church, Frittenden, near the west end of the church.

== Honours and awards ==
- In the 1870s while on the frigate Glasgow, Moore was awarded the bronze medal of the Royal Humane Society for gallantry in rescuing a seaman who had fallen overboard.
- 1 January 1892 - Captain Arthur William Moore, RN, is appointed a Companion of the Order of St Michael and St George for services in connection with the defences of Australasia.
- 25 June 1897 - Captain Arthur William Moore, CMG, Royal Navy is appointed a Companion of the Order of the Bath in commemoration of the sixtieth year of Queen Victoria's reign.
- 11 August 1905 - Vice-Admiral Sir Arthur William Moore, KCB, CMG, second in command of the channel fleet is appointed a Knight Commander of the Royal Victorian Order on the occasion of the visit of the French fleet.
- 5 February 1906 - Vice-Admiral Sir Arthur William Moore, KCB, KCVO, CMG, lately commanding HMS Caesar, which accompanied the king of Norway from Norway to Denmark in November 1905 is allowed to accept and wear the Grand Cross of the Royal Norwegian Order of St Olav awarded to him by the king of Norway.
- 16 June 1911 - Admiral Sir Arthur William Moore, KCB, KCVO, CMG, is promoted to a Knight Grand Cross of the Order of the Bath on the occasion of His Majesty's Coronation.
- 4 July 1911 - Admiral Sir Arthur William Moore, GCB, KCVO, CMG, Commander-in-Chief Portsmouth, is promoted to a Knight Grand Cross of the Royal Victorian Order on the occasion of the Review of the Fleet at Portsmouth.

Military offices
Preceded by Sir Gerard Noel	Junior Naval Lord; 1898–1901	Succeeded by Sir John Durnford
Preceded by Sir Robert Harris	Commander-in-Chief, Cape of Good Hope Station; 1901–1903	Succeeded by Sir John Durnford
Preceded by Sir Gerard Noel	Commander-in-Chief, China Station; 1906–1908	Succeeded by Sir Hedworth Meux
Preceded by Sir Assheton Curzon-Howe	Commander-in-Chief, Portsmouth; 1911–1912	Succeeded by Sir Hedworth Meux
