= William, Lord of Douglas =

William, Lord of Douglas can refer to several chiefs of the House of Douglas, an historic and warlike Scots family.

- William I, Lord of Douglas (c. 1174–1213)
- William II, Lord of Douglas (c. 1220–1274)
- William III, Lord of Douglas (c. 1240–1298)
- William IV, Lord of Douglas (died 1333)
- William Douglas, 1st Earl of Douglas (1327–1384)
- William Douglas, 6th Earl of Douglas (1426–1440)
- William Douglas, 8th Earl of Douglas (1425–1452)
