= Hugh Douglas =

Hugh Douglas may refer to:

- Hugh the Dull, Lord of Douglas (1294–c. 1342), Scottish cleric and nobleman
- Hugh Douglas, Earl of Ormonde (died 1455), Scottish nobleman and soldier
- Hugh Douglas (minister) (1911–1986), Moderator of the General Assembly of the Church of Scotland
- Hugh Douglas (American football) (born 1971), American football player
