= Earl of Douglas =

Scottish title

Undifferenced arms of the Lord of Douglas, post 1330

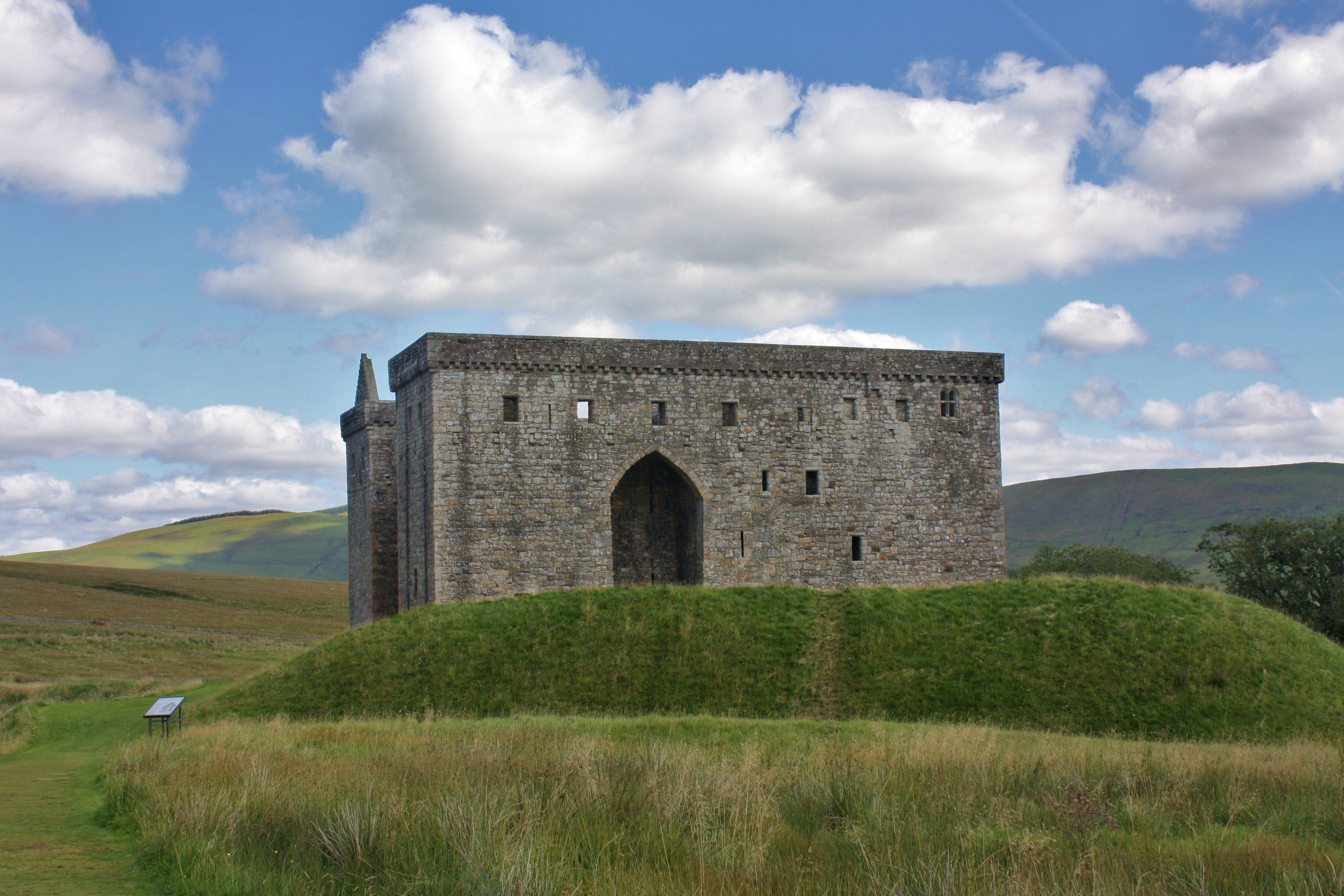
Hermitage Castle, stone castle built by 1st Earl, and held by the Douglases from the mid-14th until the late 15th century

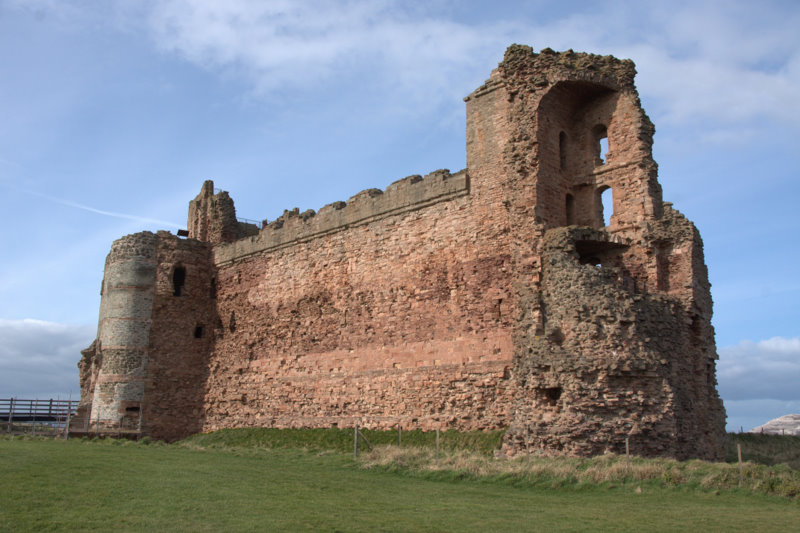
Tantallon Castle, built by the 1st Earl of Douglas, and held by the Red Douglases from 1389 until 1699

This page is concerned with the holders of the forfeit title Earl of Douglas and the preceding feudal barons of Douglas, South Lanarkshire. The title was created in the Peerage of Scotland in 1358 for William Douglas, 1st Earl of Douglas, son of Sir Archibald Douglas, Guardian of Scotland. The Earldom was forfeited by James Douglas, 9th Earl of Douglas, in 1455.

== Origins ==
=== Mythic beginnings ===
The Earls of Douglas, chiefs of Clan Douglas, and their successors claimed descent from Sholto Douglas, a mythical figure dated by Godscroft to 767 AD. However, it is more likely that they were descendants of Flemish immigrants to Scotland, during the reign of David I. Through the marriage of William the Hardy, grandfather of the 1st Earl, to Eleanor de Lovaine, the Earls of Douglas could trace their ancestry to the Landgraves of Brabant. In the story of Sholto Douglas, his son William Douglas is a commander of forces sent by the mythical Scottish king Achaius (Eochaid?), to the court of Charlemagne to aid him in his wars against Desiderius, King of the Lombards. William Douglas is said to have settled in Piacenza where his descendants became powerful local magnates under the name Scotti (or Scoto), and eventual leaders of the Guelph faction of that city.

=== Historicity ===
Comparison between pre-1330 Douglas (L) and Moray (R) Arms

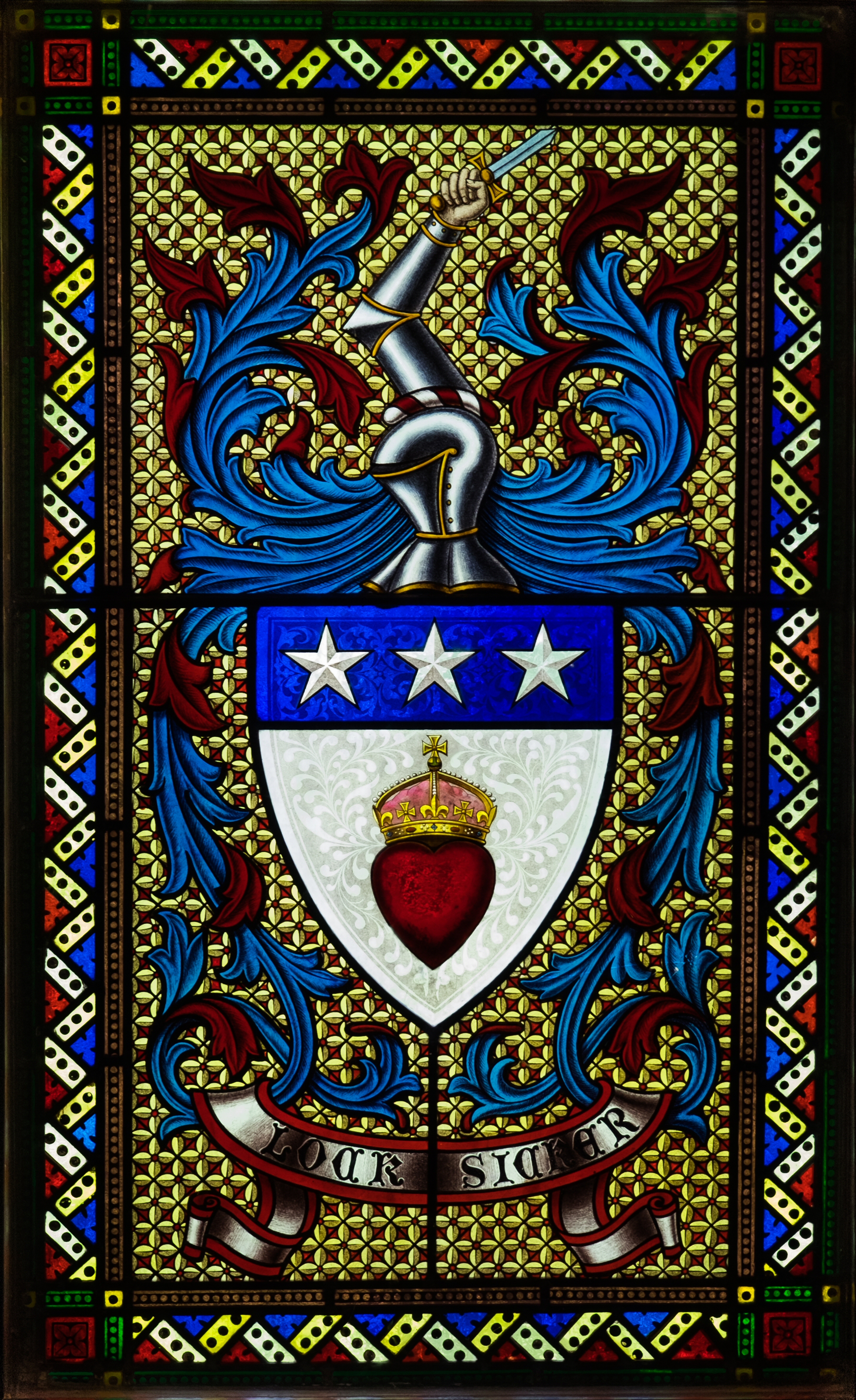
The arms of the Earl of Douglas stained glass in the King's Old Building, Stirling Castle

The first Douglas on record in Scotland is William I, Lord of Douglas (c. 1174–1214), where he was witness to a charter of bishop Jocelin of Glasgow in 1198, where he signed "Will. de Dufglas" in what can only be a territorial designation. It can be deduced however, that there was a connection to the House of Moray and its progenitor, Freskin, Lord of Duffus, insofar as the later blazon of both Houses both contained three stars argent on a field azure; further in a document pertaining to Bricius de Douglas, William of Douglas's son and Bishop of Moray, he refers to his avunculus Freskin of Kerdal, an unusual name for the time in Scotland. This connection with the Morays can be later attested in a rhyme penned by Andrew of Wyntoun around the time of the marriage of Archibald the Grim to Johanna de Moravia the Moray heiress, of which further below:

Of Murrawe and the Douglas,
How that thare begynnyng was,
Syn syndry spekis syndryly
I can put that in na story.
But in thare armeyis bath thai bere
The sternys[stars] set in lyke manere;
Til mony men it is yhit sene
Apperand lyk that had bene
Of kyn be descens lyneale
Or be branchys collaterele

It is also attested to by the fact that Archibald the Grim and Johanna de Moravia had to receive permission from the pope to marry because of consanguinity.

=== Famous art works ===
In the early 16th century Charles II D'Amboise commissioned Bernardino de' Conti to do a portrait painting for him in 1505 AD. Although a friend and patron of Leonardo da Vinci, D'Amboise picked de' Conti for his traditional style of oil painting.

Prominently inscribed on the top left the painting reads, "The Earl of Douglas surnamed Black Dudley" (referring to James, Lord of Douglas).

It is unknown how many renditions de' Conti created, but there is one that resides in the Seattle Art Museum, another once owned by Henry VIII belongs to the Royal Family, and at least one belongs in a private collection.

== Rise to power ==
Sir William the Hardy is the first of the Douglas Lords on record to take a major part in domestic and international affairs. He partook in Wallace's uprising against English rule in Scotland and died captive in the Tower of London. His son Sir James Douglas, his estates forfeit to the English crown, swore allegiance to Robert the Bruce in 1306 prior to the latter's coronation, and was to share the deprivations and small victories of Bruce during the years leading up to Bannockburn. Afterwards he was appointed Warden of the Western March on the Scottish Border. Following Bruce's death, Sir James Douglas, now known as either "the Black Douglas" to the English, or the "Good Sir James" to the Scots, took the King's heart on crusade, and died fighting the Moors in Spain.

== Earldom of Douglas ==
The Good Sir James's nephew William, Lord of Douglas was created 1st Earl of Douglas in 1358, and greatly increased Douglas territory by marrying Margaret, Countess of Mar. The creation of the Earldom can be accurately dated to 26 January that year, because of a charter witnessed by Douglas on the 25 January where he is described as "William, Lord of Douglas, Knight", and another of the 27th of the month as the Earl of Douglas. The power of Douglas was further increased by the marriage of the 2nd Earl to Princess Isabel, daughter to Robert II of Scotland. The acme of Douglas territorial power came when Archibald the Grim, Lord of Galloway and a bastard son of the Good Sir James inherited the Earldom following the 2nd Earl's death at the Battle of Otterburn. "Black Archibald" as he was also known, was by right of conquest Lord of Galloway; and by right of his wife, the Moray heiress Joanna de Moravia, the Lord of Bothwell and its vast entail. Already one of the largest landowners in the realm, Archibald the Grim was now the greatest tenant-in-chief of the Scottish Crown.

William, the 1st Earl, Archibald the Grim and both his son the 4th Earl and his grandson the 5th Earl fought in France as well as the along the Anglo-Scottish Border, during what would become known as the Hundred Years War. The 1st Earl and the 3rd were both present at the Battle of Poitiers, and the future 5th Earl Archibald, Earl of Wigtown was a deputy of John Stewart, Earl of Buchan at the Battle of Baugé and elsewhere. Archibald Douglas, 4th Earl of Douglas, had fought at Homildon Hill, was captured there and then joined the rebel Northern English Barons to fight at the Battle of Shrewsbury where he was again captured. It was during this episode of his life that Douglas makes an appearance as one of the characters in William Shakespeare's Henry IV, Part 1. In 1423 Douglas's son Wigtown, returned to Scotland to raise more troops for the French war and managed to enlist his father's support, the 4th Earl sailed for France with an army some 6,500 strong, was created Duke of Touraine and Lieutenant General of France by a grateful Dauphin. Douglas was killed at Battle of Verneuil in 1424. The 5th Earl of Douglas upon his accession was sometime regent of Scotland during the minority of James II of Scotland and Lieutenant-General of Scotland.

The 5th Earl's sons, the sixteen-year-old William Douglas, 6th Earl of Douglas and his brother David Douglas, were to be victim to the cabal of Sir William Crichton, Sir Alexander Livingston of Callendar, and their great uncle James Douglas, Earl of Avondale who wished to break the power of the Black Douglases. The boys were summoned to Edinburgh Castle, and where at what is known as the "Black Dinner" the Earl and his brother were taken into the Castleyard and executed before the young king.

== Downfall of the Black Douglases ==
The Earl of Avondale, the boys' great uncle and supposed conspirator into their deaths, became the 7th Earl of Douglas; known as "James the Gross" he inherited all the Douglas patrimony and died in 1443. Far from breaking Douglas power, the death of the 6th Earl consolidated it into the hands of the five formidable sons of James the Gross. James II of Scotland, exasperated at his overmighty vassal, William Douglas, 8th Earl of Douglas, and his refusal to break a league entered into with the Earl of Crawford and John of Islay, stabbed him to death with his own hands, even though Douglas had been issued a safe conduct. Douglas's brothers, James Douglas, 9th Earl of Douglas, Archibald Douglas, Earl of Moray, Hugh Douglas, Earl of Ormonde, and John Douglas, Lord of Balvenie went into open rebellion against the Crown, but were finally put down in a skirmish in 1455 known as the Battle of Arkinholm; the royal forces were led by another Douglas, the "Red" George Douglas, 4th Earl of Angus. The Douglas brothers were all slain, either in battle or executed afterwards, except the 9th Earl who was in England at the time. The 9th Earl was forfeited, but continued to foment unrest in Scotland from England, until his capture at the Battle of Lochmaben Fair in 1484. The aged Douglas was forced to spend the rest of his days at Lindores Abbey, his estates being divided up between the King's supporters, most notably Angus.

== Black and Red Douglases ==
Following the death of the 2nd Earl at the Battle of Otterburn in 1388 without legitimate issue, the Earldom passed to a bastard son of "The Good Sir James", the poetically named Archibald the Grim, the Lord of Galloway. This occurred through articles of special entail in the resignation of title by Hugh the Dull, Lord of Douglas. George Douglas, 1st Earl of Angus the bastard son of the 1st Earl by his sister-in law Margaret Stewart, Dowager Countess of Mar & Countess of Angus, inherited his mother's Earldom of Angus. Retrospectively the two branches of Douglas and Angus were described as the Black and Red lines respectively.

The Black Douglases fell from power and were attainted by King James II in 1455. The seventh Earl was created Earl of Avondale and Lord Balveny in 1437, also in the Peerage of Scotland. These titles also became forfeit in 1455.

The title of Douglas was restored in 1633 for the "Red" Douglas line, when William Douglas, 11th Earl of Angus (1589–1660), was created First Marquess of Douglas by Charles I.

== Lords of Douglas ==
- William I, Lord of Douglas (died c. 1214)
- Archibald I, Lord of Douglas (died c. 1240)
- William Longleg, Lord of Douglas (c. 1220–c. 1274)
- William 'The Hardy', Lord of Douglas (c. 1240–1298) Died captive in the Tower of London
- James 'The Good', Lord of Douglas (c. 1290–1330) Killed at the Battle of Teba
- William IV, Lord of Douglas (died 1333) Killed at the Battle of Halidon Hill
- Hugh the Dull, Lord of Douglas (1294–c. 1345) resigned Lordship 1342
- William, Lord of Douglas (1327–1384) Created first Earl 1358.

== Earls of Douglas (1358) ==
- William Douglas, 1st Earl of Douglas (from 1358)(1327–1384)
- James Douglas, 2nd Earl of Douglas (from 1384)(1358–1388), killed at the Battle of Otterburn
- Archibald Douglas, Lord of Galloway, 3rd Earl of Douglas (1325–1400) "the Grim", Bastard cousin of the 1st Earl, created Earl of Wigtown 1372
- Archibald Douglas, 4th Earl of Douglas (1370–1424) Duke of Touraine, killed at the Battle of Verneuil
- Archibald Douglas, 5th Earl of Douglas (1390–1439), son of the above
- William Douglas, 6th Earl of Douglas (1426–1440), Murdered at the Black Dinner at Edinburgh Castle
- James Douglas, 7th Earl of Douglas (died 1443) "the Gross" created Earl of Avondale in 1437, murderer and great-uncle of above.
- William Douglas, 8th Earl of Douglas and 2nd Earl of Avondale (1425–1452), Murdered by James II of Scotland at Stirling Castle.
- James Douglas, 9th Earl of Douglas and 3rd Earl of Avondale (died 1488), the last "Black Douglas", brother of the previous, attainted 1455 and all his titles forfeit.

Lordship of Douglas, and other estates and title devolved upon: George Douglas, 4th Earl of Angus

=== Other titles held ===
The following titles were held by the Earl of Douglas, at various times.

- Dukedom of Touraine
- Earldom of Mar
- Earldom of Wigtown
- Earldom of Avondale
  - Lordship of Balvenie- subsidiary title of Lord Avondale
- Earldom of Moray
- Earl of Ormonde
- Lordship of Annandale
- Lordship of Galloway
- County of Longueville
- Seigneurie of Dun-le-Roi

== Family tree ==
Family tree of the: Earls of Angus, Earls of Avondale, Earls of Douglas, Marquesses of Douglas, Earls of Forfar, Earls of Ormond and Marquesses of Ormond, Earls of Ross and Dukes of Ross

Earl of Angus (Stewart line) and Lord of Bonkyl, 1329
John Stewart d. 1331; 1st Earl of Angus, etc., Lord of Abernethy jure uxoris	William the Hardy; 1243–1298; Lord of Douglas
Thomas Stewart b. before 1331–1361; 2nd Earl of Angus, etc.	Archibald Douglas d. 1333	James Douglas "the Good" c. 1286–1330; Lord of Douglas
Earl of Douglas, 1358
Robert III c. 1337–1406; King of Scotland	Margaret Stewart d. 1417; 3rd Countess of Angus, etc.	William Douglas c. 1323–1384; 1st Earl of Douglas	Archibald Douglas "the Grim" c. 1330 – c. 1400; 3rd Earl of Douglas, Earl of Wigtown, Lord of Galloway, Lord of Douglas, Lord of Bothwell
Earl of Angus transferred from the Stewarts to the Douglasses when Margaret resigned her title in deference to her son, 1389	Earl of Avondale and Lord Balveny, 1437
James I 1394–1437; King of Scotland	Mary Stewart c. 1380–c. 1460	George Douglas; 1380–1430; 1st Earl of Angus, etc.	James Douglas c. 1358–1388; 2nd Earl of Douglas, Earl of Mar	Archibald Douglas "Tyneman" c. 1369–1424; Duke of Touraine, 4th Earl of Douglas, Earl of Wigtown, 13th Lord of Douglas, Lord of Galloway, Lord of Douglas, Lord of Bothwell m. Margaret of Carrick, daughter of Robert III	James Douglas; 1371–1443; 7th Earl of Douglas, 1st Earl of Avondale, etc.
William Douglas; 1398–1437; 2nd Earl of Angus, etc.	Douglases of Drumlanrig	Archibald Douglas c. 1391–1439; Duke of Touraine, 5th Earl of Douglas, Earl of Wigtown, Lord of Galloway, Lord of Douglas, Lord of Bothwell, Lord of Selkirk and Ettrick Forest, Eskdale, Lauderdale, Liddesdale and Annandale, Count of Longueville, Seigneur de Dun-le-roi
Earl of Ormond (Scotland) (1st creation), 1445
James II; 1430–1460; King of Scotland	James Douglas; 1428–1446; 3rd Earl of Angus, etc.	George Douglas c. 1427–1463; 4th Earl of Angus, etc.	William Douglas c. 1424–1440; Duke of Touraine, 6th Earl of Douglas, Earl of Wigtown, Lord of Galloway, Lord of Bothwell, Lord of Selkirk and Ettrick Forest, Eskdale, Lauderdale, and Annandale, Count of Longueville, Seigneur de Dun-le-roi	William Douglas; 1425–1452; 8th Earl of Douglas, 2nd Earl of Avondale, etc.	James Douglas; 1426–1491; 9th Earl of Douglas, 3rd Earl of Avondale, etc.	Hugh Douglas d. 1455; Earl of Ormond
Earldom of Douglas and Earldom of Avondale forfeit, 1491	Eardom of Ormand forfeit, 1455
James III; 1451/1452–1448; King of Scotland	Archibald Douglas c. 1449–1513; 5th Earl of Angus, etc.
Marquess of Ormond (Scotland) (1st creation), 1476; Earl of Ross, 1481; Duke of Ross, 1488
James IV; 1473–1513; King of Scotland	James Stewart; 1476–1504; Duke of Ross, etc.	George Douglas; 1469–1513 styled Master of Angus	William Douglas of Glenbervie; 1473–1513
Dukedom of Ross (1488 creation), Marqessate of Ormond (1st creation) and Earldom of Ross (1481 creation) extinct, 1504
Duke of Ross (2nd creation), 1514
James V 1512–1542; King of Scotland	Alexander Stewart; 1514–1515; Duke of Ross	Archibald Douglas; 1490–1557; 6th Earl of Angus, etc.	George Douglas of Pittendreich d. 1552	Archibald Douglas of Glenbervie; 1513–1570
Dukedom of Ross (2nd creation) extinct, 1515	Earl of Ross (1565 creation)
Mary; 1542–1587; Queen of Scotland	Henry Stuart; 1546–1567; Duke of Albany, 1st Earl of Ross, Lord Darnley, Lord Ardmannoch	David Douglas c. 1515–1558; 7th Earl of Angus, etc.	William Douglas; 1533–1591; 9th Earl of Angus, etc.
James VI and I 1566–1625; 2nd Earl of Ross, later King of Scotland	Archibald Douglas; 1555–1588; 8th Earl of Angus, etc., Earl of Morton	William Douglas; 1553–1611; 10th Earl of Angus, etc.
Earldom of Ross (1565 creation), merged with the crown
Marquess of Ormond (Scotland) (2nd creation), Earl of Ross, and Lord Ardmannoch, 1600	Earldom of Angus (1389 creation) resigned in favor of: Marquess of Douglas, Earl of Angus, Lord Abernethy, Lord Bonkyll and Preston, Lord Abernethy, and Lord Jedburgh Forest, 1633
Elizabeth Stuart; 1596–1662	Charles Stuart; 1600–1649; Marquess of Ormond, etc., Later King Charles I of England and Scotland	William Douglas; 1589–1660; 1st Marquess of Douglas, etc. 11th Earl of Angus, etc. (1389 creation)
Marquessate of Ormand (2nd creation) and Earldom of Ross (1600 creation) merged with the Crown, 1625
Earl of Ormond (Scotland) (2nd creation), 1651
Sophia of Hanover; 1630–1714	Archibald Douglas; 1609–1655; 1st Earl of Ormond
Earl of Forfar (1st creation), 1661
King George I 1660–1727	James Douglas c. 1646–1700; 2nd Marquess of Douglas, etc.	Archibald Douglas; 1653–1712; 2nd Earl of Ormond, 1st Earl of Forfar
Duke of Douglas, Marquess of Angus and Abernethy, Viscount of Jedburgh Forest, Lord Douglas of Bonkill, Prestoun, and Robertoun, 1703
King George II; 1683–1760	Archibald Douglas; 1694–1761; 1st Duke of Douglas, etc., 3rd Marquess of Douglas, etc.	Archibald Douglas; 1692–1715; 3rd Earl of Ormond, 2nd Earl of Forfar
Dukedom of Douglas, marquessate of Angus and Abernethy, and viscountcy of Jedburgh Forest, lordship Douglas of Bonkill, Prestoun, and Robertoun extinct, 1761; Marquessate of Douglas, earldom of Angus, and lordship of Abernethy and Jedburgh Forest passed to James Hamilton, 7th Duke of Hamilton	Earldoms of Ormond and Forfar extinct, 1715
Frederick; 1707–1751; Prince of Wales
King George III; 1683–1760
Edward Augustus; 1767–1820; Duke of Kent and Strathearn
Queen Victoria; 1819–1901
King Edward VII; 1841–1910
Duke of Clarence and Avondale and Earl of Athlone, 1890
Prince Albert Victor; 1864–1892; Duke of Clarence and Avondale, etc.	King George V 1865–1936
Dukedom of Clarence and Avondale and Earldom of Athlone extinct, 1892
King George VI; 1895–1952
Queen Elizabeth II; 1926–2022
Earl of Forfar (2nd creation), 2019
Prince Edward b. 1964; Duke of Edinburgh, Earl of Forfar

== Seals of the Douglas Lords ==
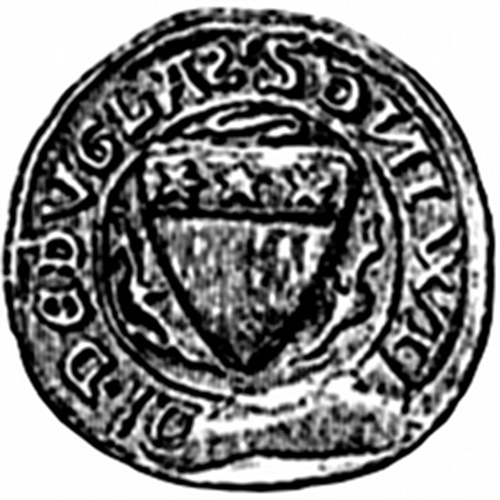
Seal of William le Hardi, Lord of Douglas

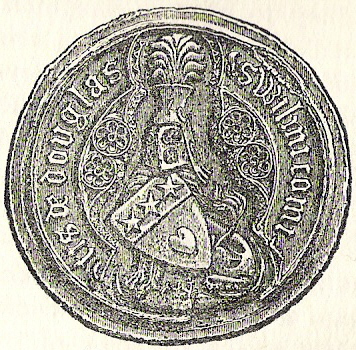
Seal attributed to William, 1st Earl of Douglas,

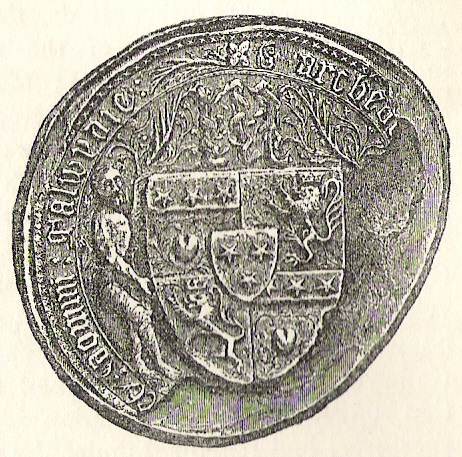
Seal of Archibald the Grim, 3rd Earl of Douglas

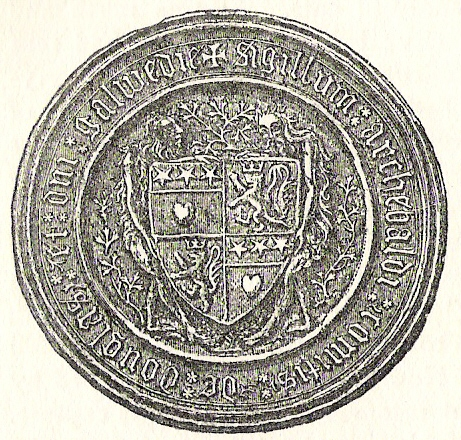
Seal of the 4th Earl of Douglas, Duke of Touraine

== See also ==
=== Red Douglas ===
- Earl of Angus, later Marquess of Douglas and Duke of Douglas.

This line is represented now by the Dukes of Hamilton, the heirs male of the House of Douglas.

=== Other lines ===
- Earl of Home (in the female line), in the capacity of Lord Douglas of that Ilk
- Earl of Queensberry (since 1633), later Marquess of Queensberry (since 1682) and Duke of Queensberry (1684–1810).
- Earl of Morton (since 1458)
  - Baron Penrhyn (since 1866)
- Swedish-German Line: Descendants of Robert Douglas, Count of Skenninge (1611–1662)
