= William I of Douglas =

Scottish noble

William of Douglas (died c. 1214) was a medieval nobleman living in Clydesdale, an area under the control of the King of the Scots.

== Enigmatic origins ==
The origins of William are uncertain, the first of the name of Douglas to appear on historic record. He appears as witness to a charter of Jocelin, Bishop of Glasgow in 1174 in favour of the monks of Kelso Abbey, at which time he was in possession of the Lands of Douglas. Some researchers believe that he was the son of Theobald le Fleming (born 1120, Aldingham Manor, Lancashire, England died 1193, Douglasdale, Midlothian, Scotland), however there is no proof of this relationship. William of Douglas' wife was either the daughter or the sister of Freskin de Kersdale (of Moray) who may also be the same Freskin referred to as Freskin of Moray, progenitor of the Murray families of Moray known collectively as de Moravia and /or Murreff.

=== Sholto/William ===
David Hume of Godscroft in his history refers to the progenitor of the House of Douglas, Sholto. Gleaned from the works of Buchanan and Boece, Godscroft's narrative explains that during the reign of a King Solvathius, Sholto Douglas was instrumental in putting down an uprising by a usurper Donald Bain in 767AD, and as reward was granted the lands that would after be called Douglas.

Both Balfour Paul and Maxwell agree that this origin tale is mythic, but do contest that William of Douglas was active at the time of the real rebellion of the Meic Uilleim, under their chief Domnall mac Uilleim. The earlier historians may have confused the mythic Donald Bain with Domnall Bán mac Domnaill, the penultimate Meic Uilleim chief.

This may be corroborated by the facts that the lands of Douglas marched with those of the leader of King William I of Scotland's retaliatory forces, Lochlann, Lord of Galloway. William may well have been a vassal of the Lord of Galloway. Furthermore, all of William's sons with the exception of the eldest were to hold privileged ecclesiastic positions within the former Meic Uilleim territories in Moray.

Although William de Douglas was the first known owner of Douglasdale, holding that land between 1174 and 1213, there is reason to question that his father was "Theobaldo Flamatico" or Theobald the Fleming who also held lands nearby. Theobald's family's arms might indicate the kinship with Murray and a descent like that of Brodie and Innes, from a third son of the house of Boulogne. In Flanders, there was a family of the Theobalds who were hereditary castellans of Ypres between about 1060 and 1127, after which their history becomes obscure. Theobald's lands in Scotland were granted to him soon after 1150 by the Abbot of Kelso.

William de Douglas having married the sister or daughter of Freskin de Kerdale or Freskin of Moray, had by her six sons; the five younger of them all went to Moray to support their uncle there as ecclesiastics. His heir, Archenbald, became Abbot of Dunfermline Abbey in Fife then inherited the Douglas estates. Archenbald married a daughter of Sir John Crawford.

== Issue ==
William of Douglas may have married Margaret, a sister of Freskin of Kerdal, seemingly a Flemish laird from Moray. He had issue:

- Archibald I (1166-1213), Lord of Douglas, married Margaret, daughter of Sir John Crawford of Crawford
- Bricius de Douglas (ca. 1170–1222), Bishop of Moray
- Alexander de Douglas (ca. 1171–1238), a canon of Spynie, vicar capitular of Elgin
- Henry de Douglas (ca. 1173–1245), a canon of Spynie
- Hugh de Douglas (ca. 1175–1245), a canon of Spynie, Archdeacon of Moray
- Freskin de Douglas (ca.1176 -September 1232), parson of Douglas, later Dean of Moray
- Margaret de Douglas (ca. 1177-1260), married Hervey de Keith, Marischal of Scotland

Baronage of Scotland
Preceded by unknown	Lord of Douglas b.1174–c.1214	Succeeded by Archibald I, Lord of Douglas
