= Andrew Douglas of Hermiston =

Scottish nobleman

Coat of Arms of the House Douglas of Dalkeith

Sir Andrew Douglas of Hermiston (d. bef. 1277) was a medieval Scottish nobleman.

== Life ==
Although it cannot be proven except circumstantially, Douglas was possibly related along maternal lines to Archibald, Lord of Douglas (c.1198-1238) or related to Archibald's wife Margaret Crawford. There is charter evidence of the Lord of Douglas receiving the lands of Hermiston from Máel Coluim II, Earl of Fife

Sir Andrew is the ancestor of the Earls of Morton, and the family of Douglas of Mains. Recent Y-DNA studies have shown this Andrew of Douglas to be unrelated paternally to descendants of Archibald's father William 1st Lord of Douglas.

== See also ==
- Scottish people
