= Archibald Douglas, 5th Earl of Douglas =

Scottish nobleman

Archibald Douglas: Earl of Douglas; Duke of Touraine; Earl of Wigton
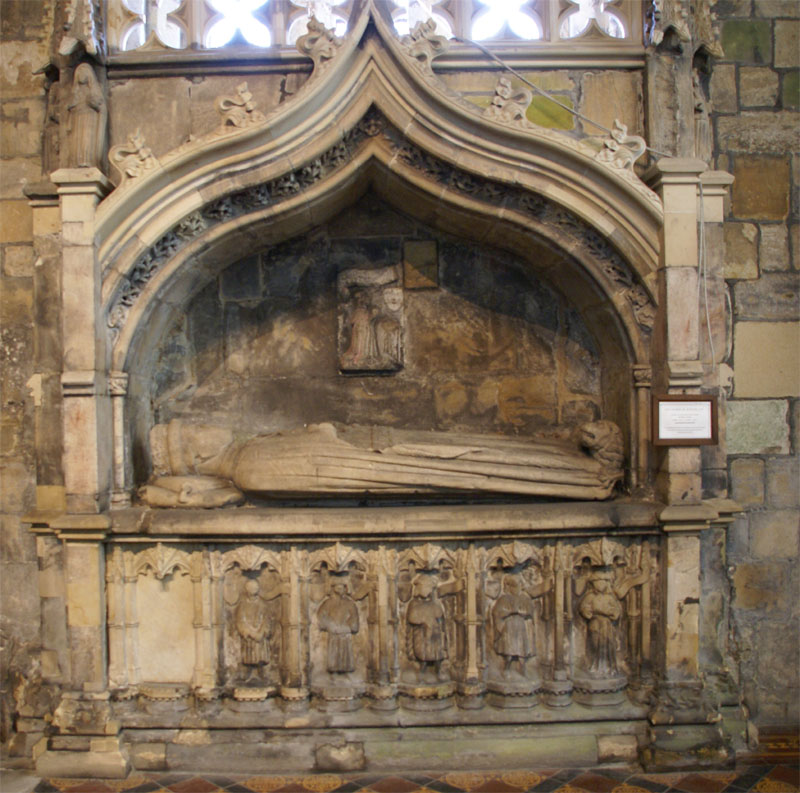
- Tomb of the Earl of Douglas
- Born: c. 1391
- Died: 26 June 1439; Restalrig, Midlothian
- Resting place: St Bride's Kirk, Douglas, South Lanarkshire
- Title: Earl of Douglas; Duke of Touraine (de jure); Earl of Wigton; Lord of Galloway; Lord of Bothwell, Selkirk and Ettrick Forest, Eskdale, Lauderdale, Liddesdale and Annandale; Count of Longueville; Seigneur de Dun-le-roi
- Spouse: Euphemia Graham
- Children: William Douglas, 6th Earl of Douglas; Margaret Douglas, Fair Lady of Galloway; David Douglas
- Parents: Archibald Douglas, 4th Earl of Douglas (father); Princess Margaret of Scotland (mother)
- Family: Clan Douglas

Archibald Douglas, 5th Earl of Douglas (c. 1391 – 26 June 1439) was a Scottish nobleman and general during the Hundred Years' War.

== Life ==
Douglas was the son of Archibald Douglas, 4th Earl of Douglas and Margaret Stewart, eldest daughter of Robert III. He was Earl of Douglas and Wigtown, Lord of Galloway, Lord of Bothwell, Selkirk and Ettrick Forest, Eskdale, Lauderdale and Annandale in Scotland, and de jure Duke of Touraine, Count of Longueville and Seigneur of Dun-le-roi in France. In contemporary French sources, he was known as Victon, a phonetic translation of his Earldom of Wigtown.

He fought for the French at Baugé in 1421 and was made count of Longueville in Normandy. He succeeded to his father's Scottish and French titles in 1424, though he never drew on his father's French estates of the Duchy of Touraine. Douglas served as ambassador to England in 1424, during the ransoming of King James I of Scotland.

He also sat on the jury of 21 knights and peers which convicted Murdoch Stewart, Duke of Albany and two of his sons of treason in 1425, leading to the execution of Albany and the virtual annihilation of his family.

Following the murder of James I at Perth in 1437, Douglas was appointed Lieutenant General of Scotland, and held the office of Regent, during the minority of James II until 1439. Douglas died from a fever in Restalrig, Midlothian, and was buried at Douglas.

== Marriage and issue ==
Between 1423 and 1425 he married Lady Eupheme Graham (before 1413–1468), daughter of Patrick Graham, de jure uxoris Earl of Strathearn and Euphemia Stewart, Countess of Strathearn. They had three children:

- William Douglas (c. 1424–24 November 1440), who briefly succeeded as 6th Earl;
- Margaret Douglas, Fair Lady of Galloway (before 1435–1475);
- David Douglas (before 1430–24 November 1440).

Both sons were summarily beheaded at Edinburgh Castle on trumped-up charges, in the presence of the child king James II. The "Black Dinner" led to the lordships of Annandale and Bothwell being annexed by the crown, Galloway to their sister, Margaret Douglas, and the Douglas lands and earldom passed to William's great-uncle James Douglas, Earl of Avondale, who was himself implicated, with Sir William Crichton, in the murder of the young earl.

Peerage of Scotland
Preceded by Archibald Douglas	Earl of Douglas; 1424–1439	Succeeded by William Douglas
French nobility
Preceded by Archibald Douglas	de jure Duke of Touraine; 1424–1439 _{Louis III of Naples de facto} _{1424–1434}	Succeeded by René I of Naples
