= Douglas, South Lanarkshire =

Coordinates: 55°33′16″N 3°50′46″W

Douglas: Scottish Gaelic: Dùbhghlas; Scots: Dooglis
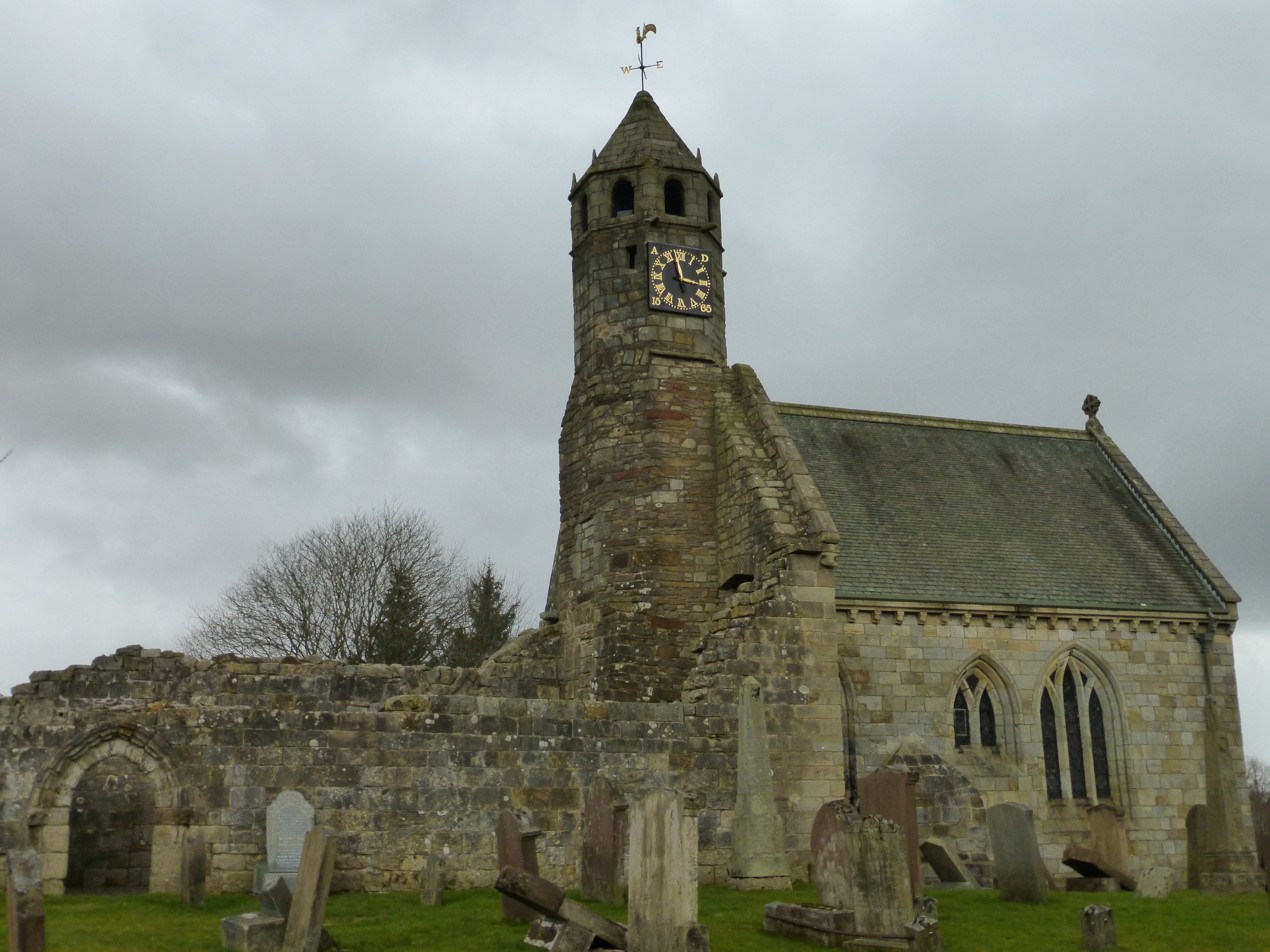
- St Bride's Kirk, Douglas

- Location within South Lanarkshire
- Area: 0.58 km^{2} (0.22 sq mi)
- Population: 1,460 (2020)
  - Density: 2,517/km^{2} (6,520/sq mi)
- OS grid reference: NS836305
  - Edinburgh: 38 mi (61 km) NE
  - London: 319 mi (513 km) SE
- Civil parish: Douglas
- Community council: Douglas
- Council area: South Lanarkshire
- Lieutenancy area: Lanarkshire
- Country: Scotland
- Sovereign state: United Kingdom
- Post town: LANARK
- Postcode district: ML11
- Dialling code: 01555
- Police: Scotland
- Fire: Scottish
- Ambulance: Scottish
- UK Parliament: Dumfriesshire, Clydesdale and Tweeddale
- Scottish Parliament: Clydesdale

Douglas (Scottish Gaelic: Dùbhghlas) is a village in South Lanarkshire, Scotland. It is located on the south bank of the Douglas Water and on the A70 road that links Ayr, on the West coast of Scotland, to Edinburgh on the East, around 12 miles south west of Lanark. The placename is of Gaelic origin, derived from the Old Gaelic dub and glais, meaning "dark stream", in reference to the Douglas Water. The Douglas family took this name when their ancestors settled here in the 12th century.

== History ==
The village grew to service the nearby Douglas Castle, the seat of the Lords of Douglas. The first recorded mention of the Parish of Douglas is in a charter of Bricius de Douglas, Bishop of Moray dated between 1203–1222 to the monks of Kelso Abbey which is witnessed by Freskin Parson of Douglas, brother to the bishop. The castle was well established by the time of William the Hardy when he was called upon to imprison Hugh de Abernethy there in 1288 and where Abernethy died at some point before 1293. The castle was occupied for some time by English forces during the Scottish Wars of Independence. However the castle was liberated by Sir James Douglas when in 1307 he and some followers trapped the English garrison inside the castle chapel whilst they were worshiping and burnt it to the ground, causing some damage to the castle.

== Notable buildings ==
The only remains of the castle are those of a 17th-century corner tower, still known as "Castle Dangerous", after the Walter Scott novel which took Douglas Castle as its inspiration. In the 1930s Charles Douglas-Home, 13th Earl of Home allowed the mining of coal in the park near to the castle, in a philanthropic effort to alleviate local unemployment. The Lanarkshire coal industry, once the mainstay of Scotland's production, had seen its output almost halved by 1937, with catastrophic consequences for local communities. As a consequence of the mining works, the castle was considered to be at risk of subsidence and had to be demolished in 1938.

The oldest structure within the village itself is the ruin of St. Bride's Church which, like the castle, originated in the 14th century. This church became the mausoleum of the Lords of Douglas. The church clock dates back to 1565 and is said to be Scotland's oldest working public clock. It is said to have been given as a gift to the village by Mary, Queen of Scots, after she spent time in the area. The clock is still in working order today, having been repaired and maintained by James Ritchie & Son in 2007/2008. The parish church was moved to its present site, near to the old chapel, where the Douglas St Bride's Parish Church still stands. Its congregation now worships at the newer St Bride's Church, built some distance away.

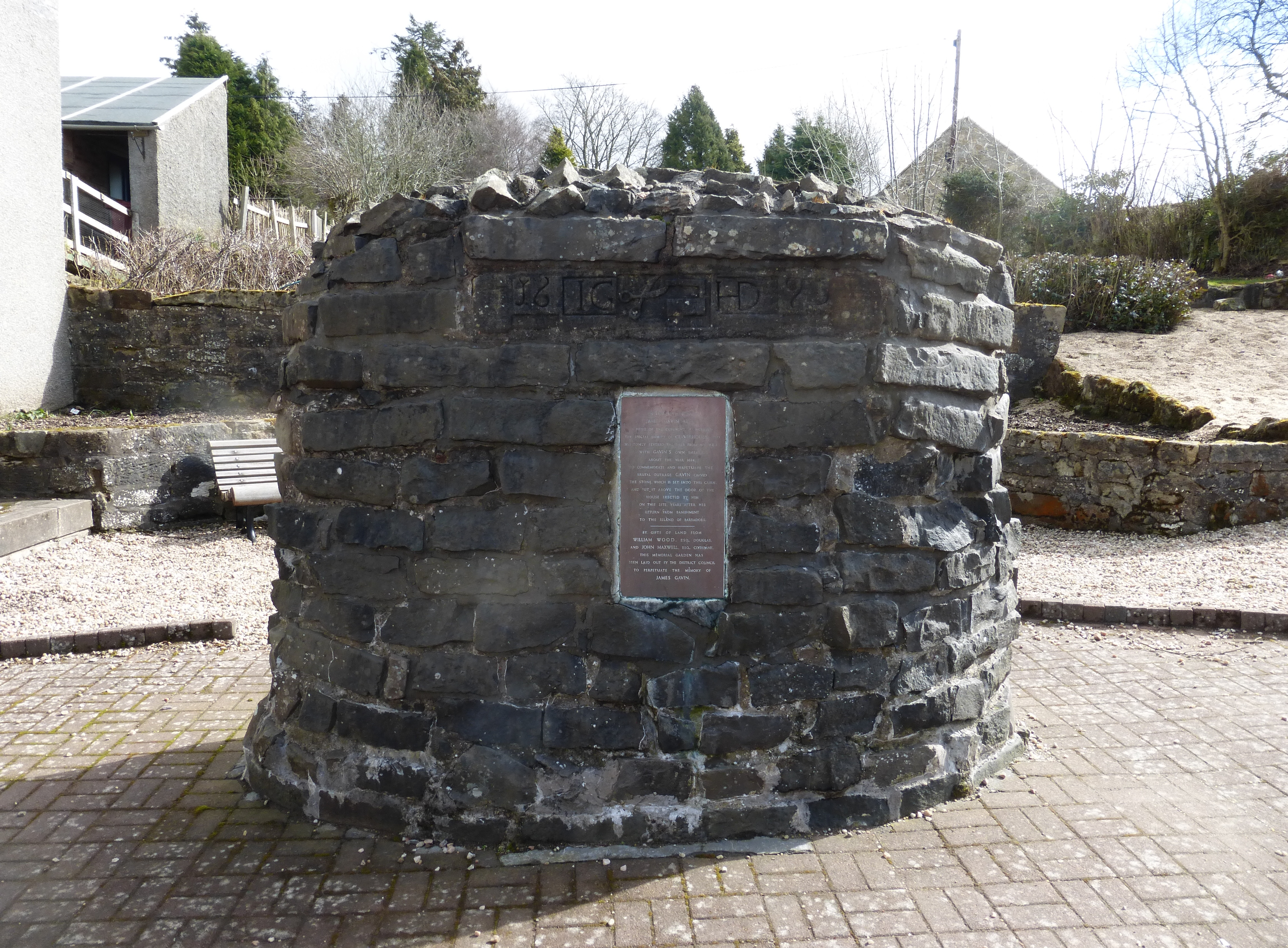
James Gavin Monument

Within the village stands a monument to the Covenanter James Gavin, a local tailor, who had his ears cut off with his own tailoring scissors for refusing to renounce his presbyterian principles. After suffering this humiliation he was transported to a life of slavery in the West Indies. The ruins of the house he built after his eventual return from banishment stood until 1968 with its engraved lintel still in place above the front door, featuring a carving of a pair of tailor's scissors. The lintel has been incorporated within the monument erected in what was the rear garden of the house. Also within the village is a statue of James Douglas, Earl of Angus, commemorating the Cameronians regiment which he raised in 1689. Nearby, another memorial commemorates its disbanding, over two and a half centuries later, in 1968.

The village was shaped later by the Industrial Revolution, which brought woollen mills and coal mining (in common with other villages in this part of Scotland). There is a heritage museum in Douglas that charts the history of the area.

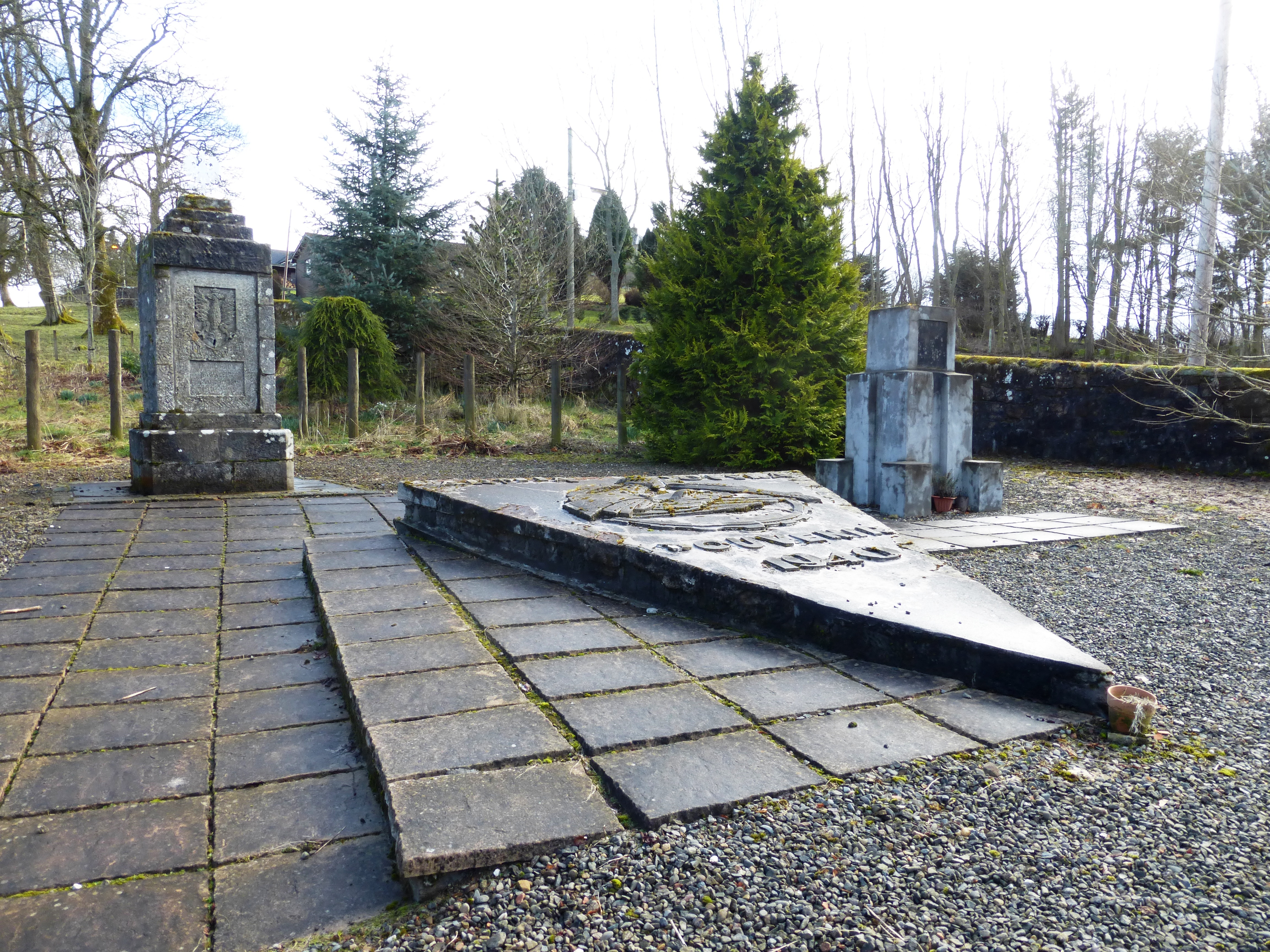
Polish Memorial Garden

The village was one of several locations near which a large camp of the Polish Army was set up in 1940. Units of the 10th Polish Cavalry, including the Podhalanski (Highland) Battalion, 10th Mounted Rifles Regiment, the 24th Lancers, as well as brigade support and service units, were stationed here for a brief period in a temporary tented camp before moving north to Fife and Angus where they were deployed to defend the east coast of Scotland against invasion. Three Polish monuments created by the 10th Cavalry Brigade in the vicinity of the village have been put together in a Memorial Garden.

== Sports ==
Glenbuck & Douglas Valley Football Academy play at Douglas' Crabtree Park. The club, formed in 2012, takes their inspiration from Bill Shankly and the original Glenbuck Cherrypickers. The club fields teams at different age groups (including boys, mixed junior, girls, mens and "walking football" grades).

== Burials at St. Bride's Church (in the Douglas family mausoleum) ==
- William Longleg, Lord of Douglas
- James Douglas, Lord of Douglas
- George Douglas, 1st Earl of Angus
- William Douglas, 1st Marquess of Douglas
- Archibald Douglas, 1st Earl of Ormond
- Archibald Douglas, 5th Earl of Douglas
- William Douglas, 6th Earl of Douglas
- James Douglas, 7th Earl of Douglas and his wife Beatrice Sinclair
