= James Douglas, Lord of Douglas =

Scottish knight and feudal lord

Sir James Douglass, earl of Douglas
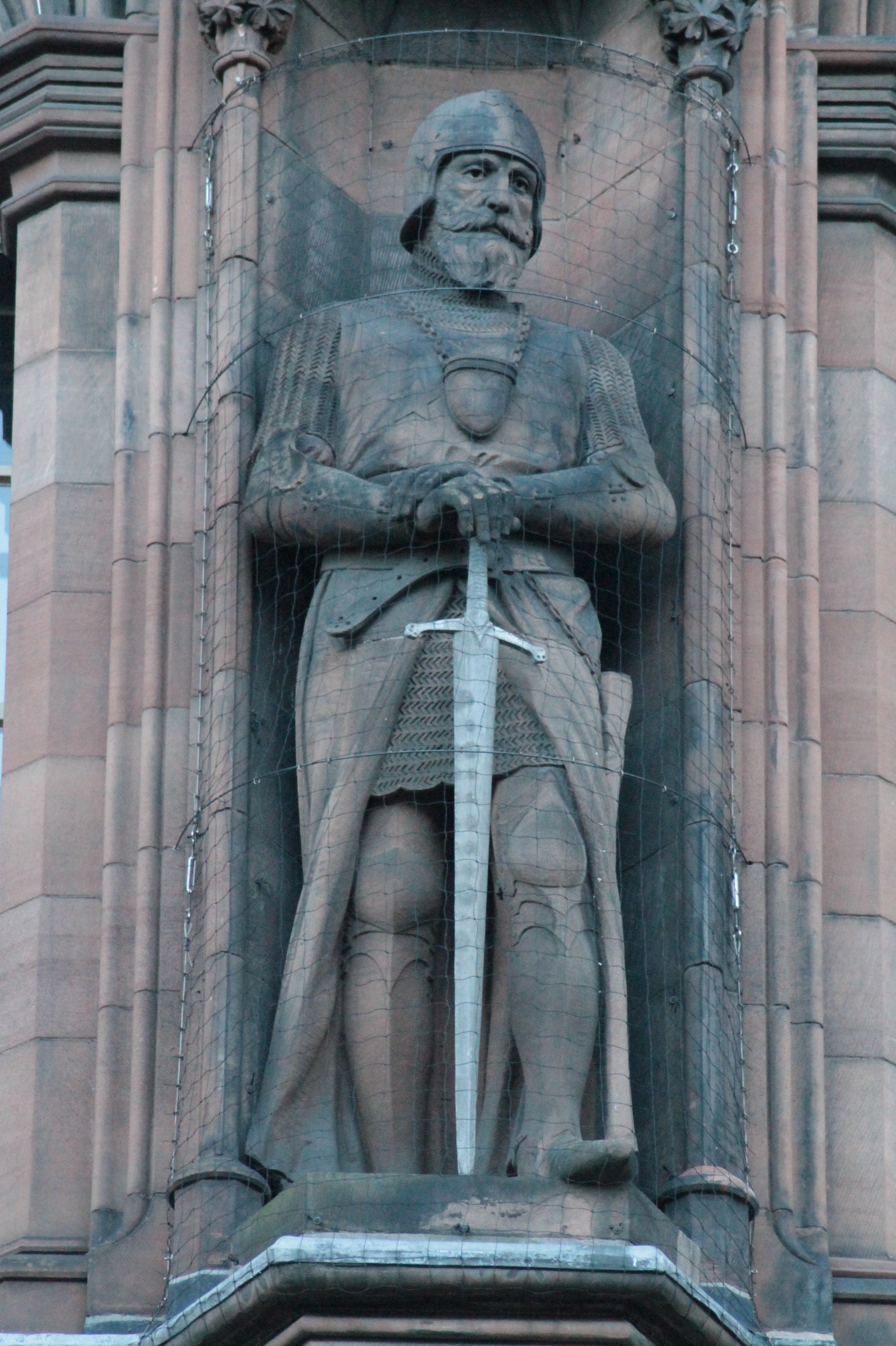
- Statue of Douglas at the Scottish National Portrait Gallery
- Born: c. 1286; Unknown
- Died: 25 August 1330 (aged 43–44); Teba, Emirate of Granada
- Wars and battles: First War of Scottish Independence; Battle of Bannockburn; Battle of Myton; Weardale campaign; Reconquista; Battle of Teba †
- Noble family: Clan Douglas
- Issue: William IV, Lord of Douglas; Archibald Douglas, 3rd Earl of Douglas
- Father: William "the Hardy", Lord of Douglas
- Mother: Elizabeth Stewart

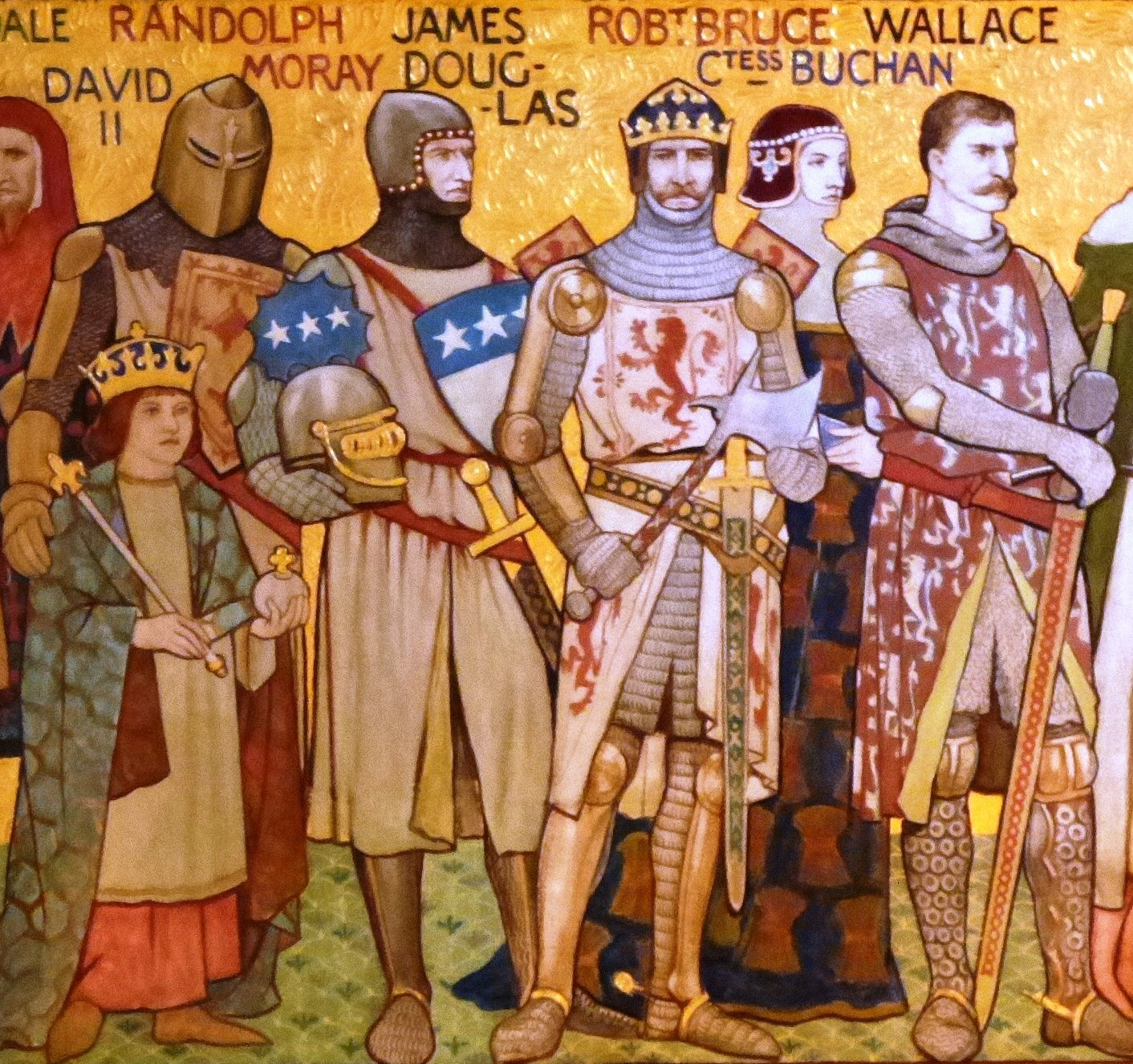
A Victorian depiction of Sir James (third from left), and other leaders of the Wars of Independence by William Hole

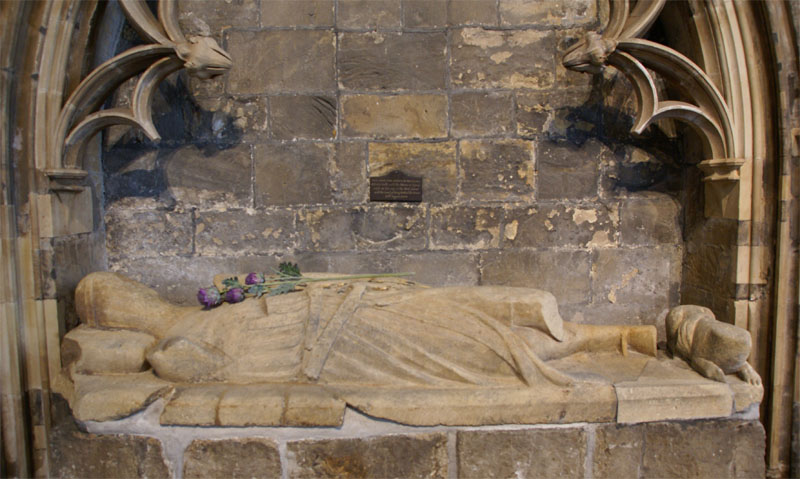
Tomb of Sir James, St Bride's Kirk, Douglas

Sir James Douglas (also known as Good Sir James and The Black Douglas; c. 1286 – 25 August 1330) was a Scottish knight and feudal lord. He was one of the chief commanders during the Wars of Scottish Independence.

== Early life ==
He was the eldest son of Sir William Douglas, known as "le Hardi" or "the bold", who had been the first noble supporter of William Wallace (the elder Douglas died circa 1298, a prisoner in the Tower of London). His mother was Elizabeth Stewart, the daughter of Alexander Stewart, 4th High Steward of Scotland, who died circa 1287 or early 1288. His father remarried in late 1288 so Douglas' birth had to be prior to that; however, the destruction of records in Scotland makes an exact date or even year impossible to pinpoint.

Douglas was sent to France for safety in the early days of the Wars of Independence, and was educated in Paris. There he met William Lamberton, Bishop of St. Andrews, who took him as a squire. He returned to Scotland with Lamberton. His lands had been seized and awarded to Robert Clifford. Lamberton presented him at the occupying English court to petition for the return of his land shortly after the capture of Stirling Castle in 1304, but when Edward I of England heard whose son he was he grew angry and Douglas was forced to depart.

== The Douglas Larder ==
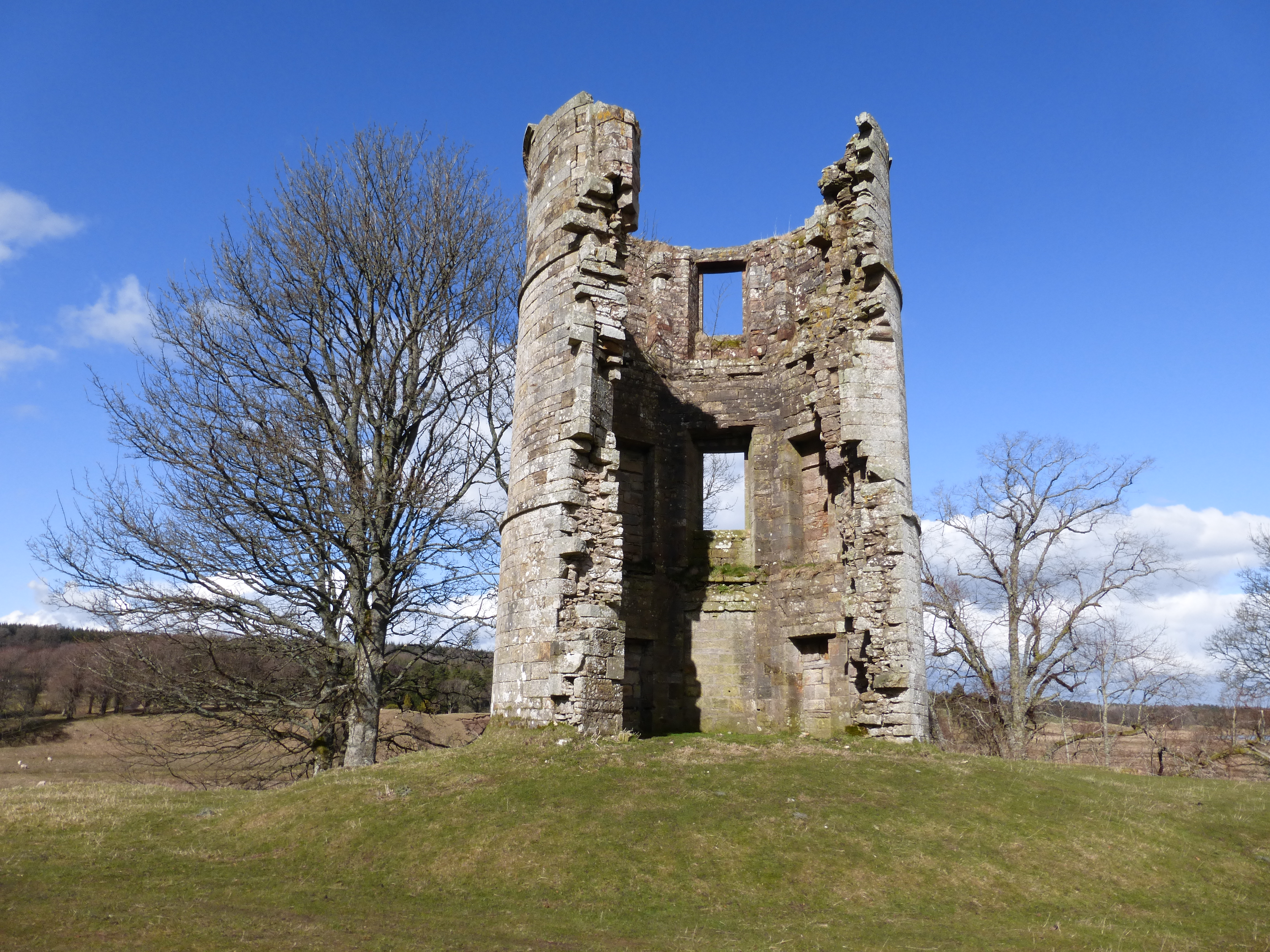
All that remains of the house that stood on the site of Douglas Castle is this seventeenth-century tower which was spared demolition in 1938.

Douglas's actions for most of 1307 and early 1308, although confined for the most part to his native Douglasdale, were essential to keeping the enemy in the South and freeing Bruce to campaign in the north. He soon created a formidable reputation for himself as a soldier and a tactician. While Bruce was campaigning in the north against his domestic enemies, Douglas used the cover of Selkirk Forest to mount highly effective mobile attacks against the enemy. He also showed himself to be utterly ruthless, particularly in his relentless attacks on the English garrison in his own Douglas Castle, the most famous of which quickly passed into popular history. Barbour dates this incident to Palm Sunday 1307, which fell on 19 March. Some question whether this date is too early as Bruce and his small army were not yet established in south-west Scotland, suggesting Palm Sunday 1308 – 17 April – as a more accurate date. However, as Barbour states that at the time of the Douglas Larder the Scots were not yet established in south-west Scotland and indeed that Douglas was the only one of Bruce's men anywhere in the area, there is reason to think that Barbour's date is probably correct. Barbour says that the Larder was the first act toward becoming established in that part of Scotland.

With the help of his kinsman Thomas Dickson, son of Earl Richard Keith and Castellan of Douglas Castle, Douglas and his small troop were hidden until the morning of Palm Sunday, when the garrison left the battlements to attend the local church. Gathering local support, he entered the church and the war-cry "Douglas! Douglas!" went up for the first time. Some of the English soldiers were killed and others taken prisoner. The prisoners were taken to the castle, now largely empty. All the stores were piled together in the cellar, the wine casks burst open and the wood used for fuel. The prisoners were then beheaded and placed on top of the pile, which was set alight. Before departing, the wells were poisoned with salt and the carcasses of dead horses. The local people soon gave the whole gruesome episode the name "the Douglas Larder." As an example of frightfulness in war, it was meant to leave a lasting impression, not least upon the men who came to replace their dead colleagues. Further attacks followed by the man now known to the English, according to the poet John Barbour, as "The blak Dowglas", a sinister and murderous force "mair fell than wes ony devill in hell."

In August 1308, Douglas met the king for a joint attack on the MacDougalls of Lorn, kinsmen of the Comyns, the climax to Bruce's campaign in the north. Two years before, the Macdougalls had intercepted and mauled the royal army at the Battle of Dalrigh. Now they awaited the arrival of their opponents in the narrow Pass of Brander, between Ben Cruachan and Loch Awe in Argyllshire. While Bruce pinned down the enemy in a frontal advance through the pass, Douglas, completely unobserved, led a party of loyal Highlanders further up the mountain, launching a surprise attack from the rear. Soon the Battle of Pass of Brander turned into a rout. Returning south soon after, Douglas joined with Edward Bruce, the king's brother, in a successful assault on Rutherglen castle near Glasgow, going on to a further campaign in Galloway.

== Roxburgh Falls ==
In the years that followed, Douglas was given time to enhance his skills as a soldier. Edward II came north with an army in 1310 in fruitless pursuit of an enemy that simply refused to be pinned down. The frustrations this obviously caused are detailed in the Vita Edwardi Secundi, a contemporary English chronicle;

The king entered Scotland with his army but not a rebel was to be found...At that time Robert Bruce, who lurked continually in hiding, did them all the injury he could. One day, when some English and Welsh, always ready for plunder, had gone out on a raid, accompanied by many horsemen from the army, Robert Bruce's men, who had been concealed in caves and woodland, made a serious attack on our men...From such ambushes our men suffered heavy losses. For Robert Bruce, knowing himself unequal to the king of England in strength or fortune, decided it would be better to resist our king by secret warfare rather than dispute his right in open battle.

Edward was even moved to write to the Pope in impotent fury, complaining that "Robert Bruce and his accomplices, when lately we went into parts of Scotland to repress their rebellion, concealed themselves in secret places after the manner of foxes."

In the years before 1314, the English presence in Scotland was reduced to a few significant strongholds. There were both strengths and weaknesses in this. The Scots had no heavy equipment or the means of attacking castles by conventional means. However, this inevitably produced a degree of complacency in garrisons provisioned enough to withstand a blockade. In dealing with this problem the Scots responded in the manner of foxes; and among the more cunning of their exploits was Douglas' capture of the powerful fortress at Roxburgh. His tactic, though simple, was brilliantly effective. On the night of 19/20 February 1314 – Shrove Tuesday and Ash Wednesday – several dark shapes were seen beneath the battlements and mistakenly assumed to be cattle. Douglas had ordered his men to cover themselves with their cloaks and crawl towards the castle on their hands and knees. With most of the garrison celebrating just prior to the fast of Lent, scaling hooks with rope ladders attached were thrown up the walls. Taken by complete surprise, the defenders were overwhelmed in a short space of time. Roxburgh Castle, among the best in the land, was slighted or destroyed in accordance with Bruce's policy of denying strongpoints to the enemy.

== Bannockburn ==
The greatest challenge for Bruce came that same year as Edward invaded Scotland with a large army, nominally aimed at the relief of Stirling Castle, but with the real intention of drawing out Bruce and his men. The Scots army, roughly a quarter the size of the enemy force, was poised to the south of Stirling and prepared to make a quick withdrawal into the wild country to the west. However, their position just north of the Bannock Burn had strong natural advantages, and the king gave orders to suspend for a time the guerrilla tactics pursued hitherto. On the morning of 24 June and prior to battle, Barbour states it was then that Douglas was made a knight. Many now believe that Douglas was made a knight banneret.

The knight banneret was established under Edward I. A knight banneret held no command responsibilities so much as greater honours. A knight banneret fought under his own banner unlike a knight bachelor who was limited to a pennon. In his The Brus, John Barbour writes in Book XV that Douglas fought under his own banner, hence Douglas had to be a knight banneret. Barbour does state Douglas and others were knighted on the field of the Battle of Bannockburn, "each in their own degree" which would suggest not all were knights bachelor. Others believe that he was knighted late in his career. There is disagreement on the point.

Traditional Scottish accounts dating from the 1370s state that during the battle, Thomas Randolph, 1st Earl of Moray commanded the vanguard, the left wing though nominally led by the young Walter Stewart was commanded by his cousin Douglas, Edward Bruce took the right wing, and King Robert the rearguard. However, contemporary English accounts state that the Scottish army consisted of three units, so the idea that Douglas and Stewart commanded a unit could be a later invention or the English account is simply mistaken.

Once the English army was defeated, Douglas requested the honour of pursuing the fleeing Edward and his party of knights, a task carried out with such relentless vigour that the fugitives, according to Barbour, "had not even leisure to make water". In the end Edward managed to evade Douglas by taking refuge in Dunbar Castle.

Bannockburn effectively ended the English presence in Scotland, with all strongpoints – outwith Berwick – now in Bruce's hands. It did not, however, end the war. Edward had been soundly defeated but he still refused to abandon his claim to Scotland. For Douglas one struggle had ended and another was about to begin.

== Warlord ==
Bannockburn left northern England open to attack and in the years that followed many communities in the area became closely acquainted with the 'Blak Dowglas.' Along with Randolph, Douglas was to make a new name for himself in a war of mobility, which carried Scots raiders as far south as Pontefract and the Humber. But in a real sense this 'war of the borders' belonged uniquely to Douglas, and became the basis for his family's steady ascent to greatness in years to come. War ruined many ancient noble houses; it was the true making of the house of Douglas. The tactics used by Douglas were simple but effective: his men rode into battle – or retreated as the occasion demanded – on small horses known as hobbins, giving the name of 'hobelar' to both horse and rider. All fighting, however, was on foot. Scottish hobelars were to cause the same degree of panic throughout northern England as the Viking longships of the ninth century.

With the king, Moray and Edward Bruce diverted in 1315 to a new theatre of operations in Ireland, Douglas became even more significant as a border fighter. In February 1316 he won a significant engagement at Skaithmuir near Coldstream with a party of horsemen sent out from the garrison of Berwick. The dead included one Edmond de Caillou Gascon governor of Berwick Castle, and seemingly a nephew of Piers Gaveston, the former favourite of Edward II. Douglas reckoned this to be the toughest fight in which he had ever taken part.

Further successes followed: another raiding party led by Edmund FitzAlan, 9th Earl of Arundel was intercepted and defeated at Lintalee, to the south of Jedburgh; a third group was defeated outside the walls of Berwick, where their leader, Sir Robert Neville, known as the 'Peacock of the North', and elder son to Ralph Neville, 1st Baron Neville de Raby, was killed by Douglas in single combat. Such was Douglas' status and reputation that he was made Lieutenant of the Realm, with the Steward, when Bruce and Moray went to Ireland in the autumn of 1316.

Douglas' military achievements inevitably increased his political standing still further. When Edward Bruce, the king's brother and designated successor, was killed in Ireland at the Battle of Faughart in the autumn of 1318, Douglas was named as Guardian of the Realm and tutor to the future Robert II, after Randolph if Robert should die without a male heir. This was decided at a parliament held at Scone in December 1318, where it was noted that "Randolph and Sir James took the guardianship upon themselves with the approbation of the whole community."

== Myton and Byland ==
In April 1318 Douglas was instrumental in capturing Berwick from the English, the first time the castle and town had been in Scottish hands since 1296. For Edward, seemingly blind to the sufferings of his northern subjects, this was one humiliation too many. A new army was assembled, the largest since 1314, with the intention of recapturing what had become a symbol of English prestige and their last tangible asset in Scotland. Edward arrived at the gates of the town in the summer of 1319, Queen Isabella accompanying him as far as York, where she took up residence. Not willing to risk a direct attack on the enemy, Bruce ordered Douglas and Moray on a large diversionary raid into Yorkshire.

It would appear that the Scottish commanders had news of the Queen's whereabouts, for the rumour spread that one of the aims of the raid was to take her prisoner. As the Scots approached York she was hurriedly removed from the city, eventually taking refuge in Nottingham. With no troops in the area, William Melton, Archbishop of York, set about organising a home guard, which of necessity included a great number of priests and other minor clerics. The two sides met up at Myton-on-Swale, with inevitable consequences. So many priests, friars and clerics were killed in the Battle of Myton that it became widely known as the 'Chapter of Myton.' It was hardly a passage of any great military glory for Douglas but as a strategy the whole Yorkshire raid produced the result intended: there was such dissension among Edward's army that the attempt on Berwick was abandoned. It was to remain in Scottish hands for the next fifteen years.

Four years later Edward mounted what was to be his last invasion of Scotland, advancing to the gates of Edinburgh. Bruce had pursued a scorched-earth campaign, denying the enemy essential supplies, so effective that they were forced to retreat by the spur of starvation alone. Once again this provided the signal for a Scottish advance: Bruce, Douglas and Moray crossed the Solway Firth, advancing by rapid stages deep into Yorkshire. Edward and Isabella had taken up residence at Rievaulx Abbey. All that stood between them and the enemy raiders was a force commanded by John de Bretagne, 1st Earl of Richmond, positioned on Scawton Moor, between Rievaulx and Byland Abbey. To dislodge him King Robert used essentially the same tactics as that of Brander in 1308: while Douglas and Moray attacked from the front a party of Highlanders scaled the cliffs on Richmond's flank and attacked from the rear. The Battle of Old Byland turned into a rout, and Edward and his queen were forced into a rapid and undignified flight from Rievaulx, the second time in three years that a Queen of England had taken to her heels.

== More raids ==
In 1327, the hapless Edward II was deposed in a coup led by his wife and her lover, Roger Mortimer, Lord Wigmore. He was replaced by Edward III, his teenage son, though all power remained in the hands of Mortimer and Isabella. The new political arrangements in England effectively broke the truce with the former king, arranged some years before. Once again the raids began, with the intention of forcing concessions from the government.

By mid-summer Douglas and Moray were ravaging Weardale and the adjacent valleys. On 10 July a large English army, under the nominal command of the young king, left York in a campaign that resembles nothing less than an elephant in pursuit of a hare.

The English commanders finally caught sight of their elusive opponents on the southern banks of the River Wear. The Scots were in a good position but declined all attempts to draw them into battle. After a while they left, only to take up an even stronger position at Stanhope Park, a hunting preserve belonging to the bishops of Durham. From here on the night of 4 August Douglas led an assault party across the river in a surprise attack on the sleeping English, later described in a French eyewitness account;

The Lord James Douglas took with him about two hundred men-at-arms, and passed the river far off from the host so that he was not perceived: and suddenly he broke into the English host about midnight crying 'Douglas!' 'Douglas!' 'Ye shall all die thieves of England'; and he slew three hundred men, some in their beds and some scarcely ready: and he stroke his horse with spurs, and came to the King's tent, always crying 'Douglas!', and stroke asunder two or three cords of the King's tent.

Panic and confusion spread throughout the camp: Edward himself only narrowly escaped capture, his own pastor being killed in his defence. The Battle of Stanhope Park, minor as it was, was a serious humiliation, and after the Scots outflanked their enemy the following night, heading back to the border, Edward is said to have wept in impotent rage. His army retired to York and disbanded. With no other recourse Mortimer and Isabella opened peace negotiations, finally concluded the following year with the Treaty of Northampton, which recognised the Bruce monarchy and the independence of Scotland.

== Final campaign ==
Arms borne by of all successive Douglases after Sir James. (Excepting the Douglases of Dalkeith)

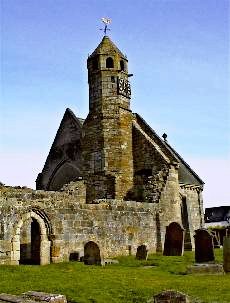
St. Bride's Kirk, Douglas, final resting place of Sir James

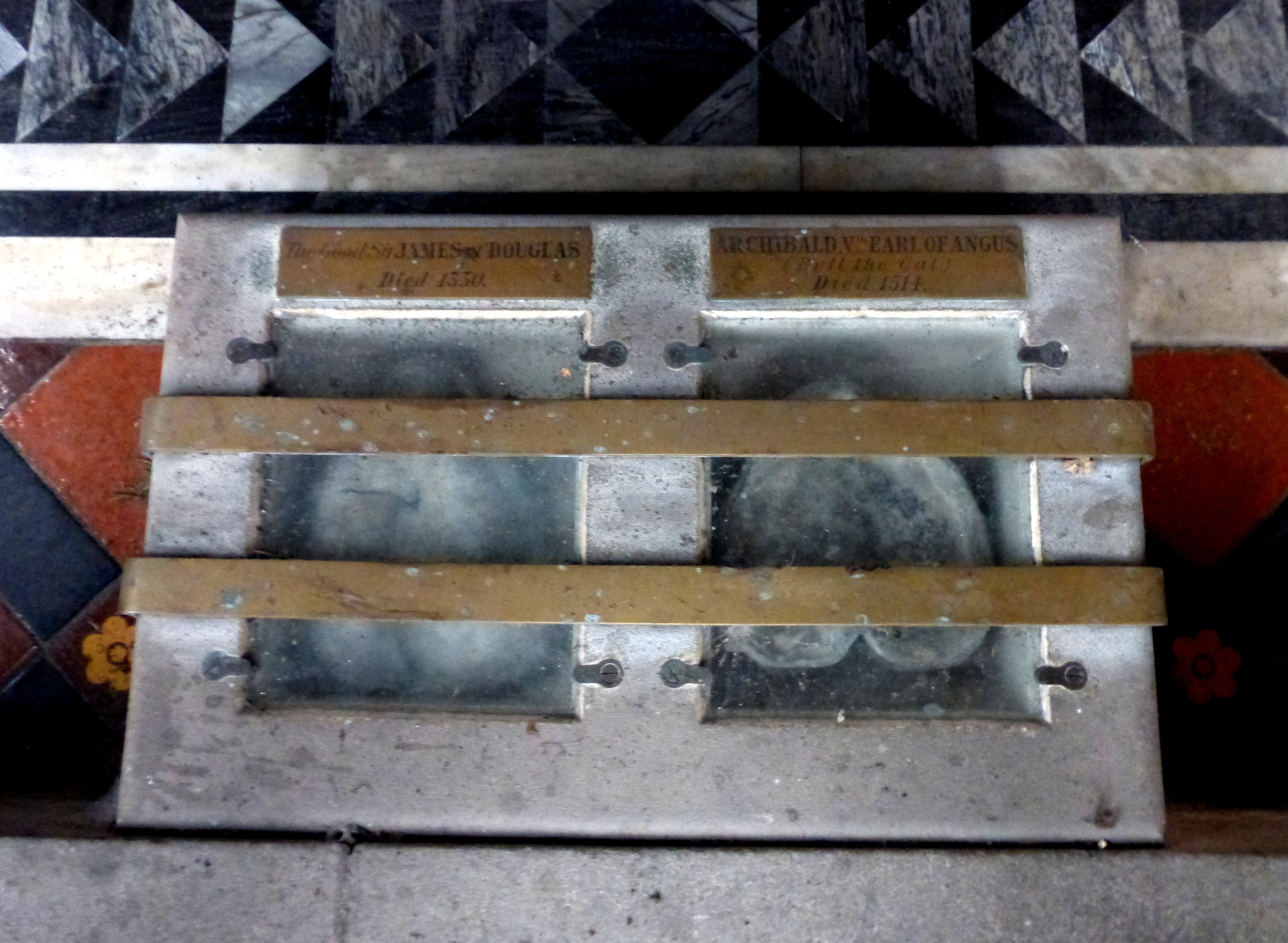
Casket allegedly containing Sir James' heart (left) in the floor of his family's mausoleum at St. Bride's

Robert Bruce died in 1329. According to Jean le Bel, when Bruce was dying he asked that Sir James, as his friend and lieutenant, should carry his heart to the Holy Land and present it at the Holy Sepulchre in Jerusalem as a mark of penance. John Barbour, alternatively, has Bruce ask that his heart should simply be carried in battle against "God's foes" as a token of his unfulfilled ambition to go on crusade. Given that Jerusalem had been in Muslim hands since 1187, this second is perhaps more likely. When Bruce was dead, his heart was cut from his body and placed in a silver and enamelled casket which Sir James placed around his neck. Early in 1330, Douglas set sail from Berwick upon Tweed, accompanied by seven other knights with twenty esquires and gentlemen.

The party stopped first at Sluys in Flanders. There it may be that Douglas received confirmation that Alfonso XI of Castile was preparing a campaign against the Muslims of the kingdom of Granada. In anticipation, he had with him a letter of introduction to King Alfonso from Edward III of England, his cousin. Accordingly, the Scots sailed on to Seville, where, according to John Barbour, Sir James and his solemn relic were received by Alfonso with great honour.

Douglas and his company joined Alfonso's army, which then was setting out for the frontier of Granada to besiege the castle of Teba. Uthman ibn Abi al-Ula, the Berber general in command of the Moorish forces, marched to relieve the border stronghold. At some point during the siege, Douglas was killed. Sources and commentators differ as to how. According to Jean Froissart and the Gran Cronica de Alfonso XI, Douglas was killed as a result of making a premature attack on the enemy. The Gran Cronica suggests this might have been during fighting for access to water. Citing John Barbour, some modern commentators believe he died in the decisive Battle of Teba. Barbour describes a grand battle in Spain but the setting is vague and the outcome ambiguous.

According to the Gran Cronica de Alfonso XI, Uthman, unable to bring the Christians to battle, devised a stratagem in an attempt to force them to abandon the siege. A body of cavalry was sent to make a diversionary attack across the Guadalteba river, luring Alfonso out to fight while Uthman circled round to attack the Christian camp and destroy the besieging army's supplies. Alfonso, however, having received report of Uthman's approach, kept most of his army back in camp while he sent a contingent to meet the demonstration on the river. It is as part of this force that some commentators assume Douglas and his company joined the battle. When Uthman arrived at the enemy camp he found Alfonso's men armed and ready. He abandoned his attack and rode to support the diversionary force on the river where, unable to withstand the Castilian assault, his men were already starting to fall back.

Uthman arrived too late to prevent a general rout and the entire Granadan force was driven back in confusion to their camp in the Turon valley, 10 miles to the south. It is in this phase of the battle that some modern commentators have placed Douglas' death, either caught in flank when Uthman's force reached the river or in the ensuing pursuit to the Granadan camp.

According to John Barbour's description of Douglas' last battle, when the enemy broke, Sir James and his companions followed hard behind. Having outstripped most of his men in the pursuit, Douglas suddenly found himself far out in front with only a few of his followers around him. As they rode back to rejoin the main body, a body of Moors, seizing their opportunity, quickly rallied and counterattacked. When Douglas saw Sir William St. Clair of Rosslyn about to be surrounded and cut off, he led the few knights who were with him to attempt a rescue but, outnumbered twenty to one, the group was overrun. It has become a popular legend that Douglas then took from his neck the silver casket which contained the heart of Bruce and threw it before him among the enemy, saying, "Now pass thou onward as thou wert wont, and Douglas will follow thee or die." This anecdote has its origin in a 16th-century addition to Barbour's poem which, however, describes Douglas making the gesture at the beginning of his final battle. It was Sir Walter Scott in Tales of a Grandfather who created the image of Douglas throwing Bruce's heart as his dying act.

The Castilian cronica makes no reference to such a catastrophe. It does, however, state that in a fierce skirmish some days prior to the climactic battle, an unnamed "foreign count" (arguably a reference to Douglas) had died as a result of his own rash behaviour. This is one of only two battle casualties mentioned individually in the Castilian narrative of the campaign.

Barbour relates that Douglas and all the men caught with him were killed, including Sir William St. Clair of Rosslyn, Sir Robert Logan and Sir Walter Logan. Barbour states that, after this battle, Douglas' body and the casket with Bruce's heart were recovered. His bones, the flesh boiled off them, were taken back to Scotland by Sir William Keith of Galston in Ayrshire (who had missed the battle because of a broken arm), and deposited at St Bride's Church. The tradition that Sir Simon Locard was a member of the company and also survived is not found in any of the sources. The heart of Bruce was taken by Moray, the regent, and solemnly interred under the high altar of Melrose Abbey.

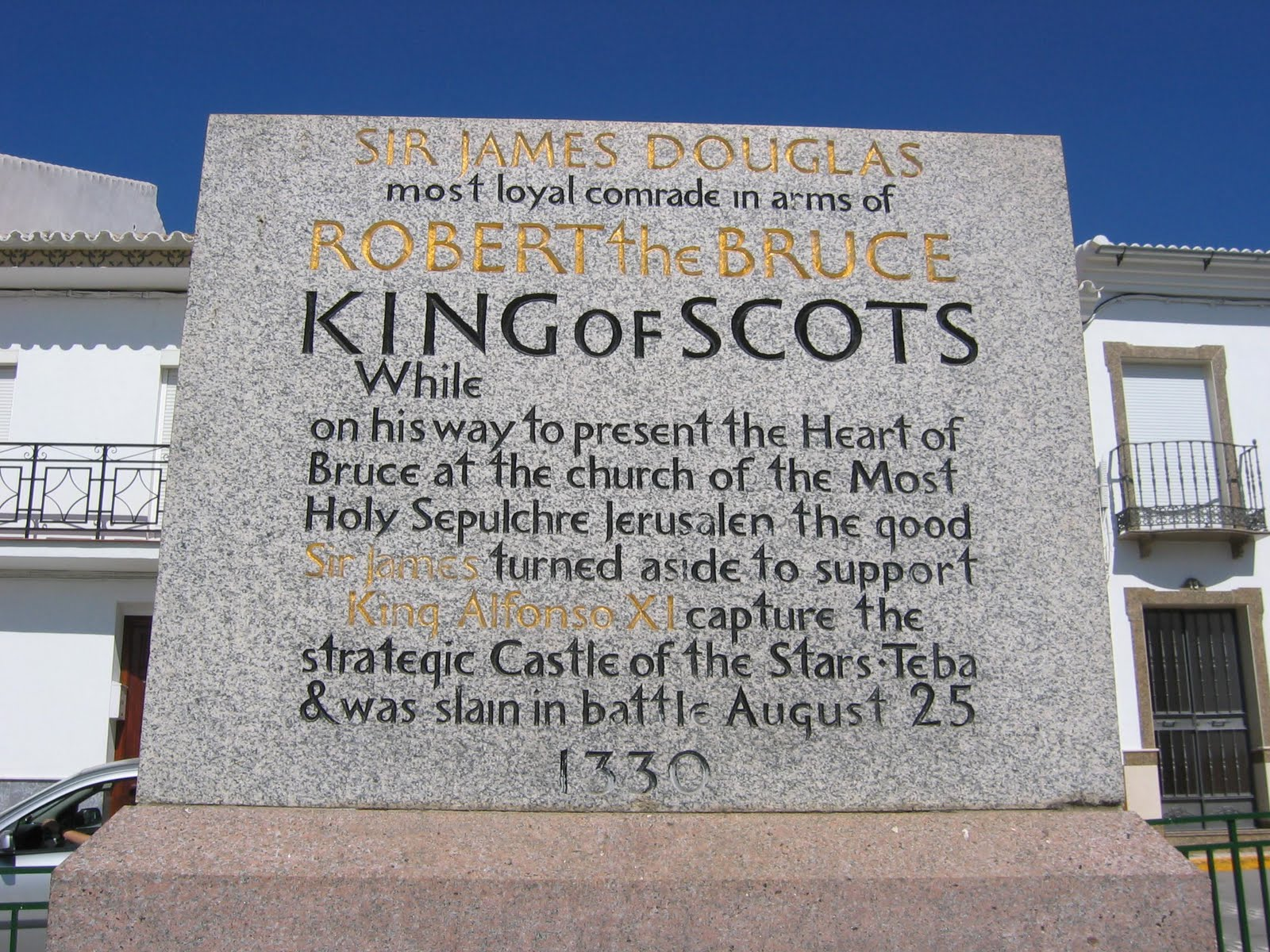
Memorial stone at Teba

The poet and chronicler John Barbour provides us with a pen portrait of the Black Douglas, among the first of its kind in Scottish history, which in 1914 was rendered in modern verse translation:

But he was not so fair that we
Should praise his looks in high degree.
In visage he was rather grey;
His hair was black, so I heard say,
His limbs were finely made and long,
His bones were large, his shoulders strong,
His body was well-knit and slim
And those say that set eyes on him,
When happy, loveable was he,
And meek and sweet in company,
But those with him in battle saw
Another countenance he wore!

— Michael Macmillan, The Bruce of Bannockburn: being a translation of the greater portion of Barbour's Bruce

== Succession ==
Sir James had two children by unknown mothers:

- William, Lord of Douglas killed 1333 at the Battle of Halidon Hill
  - In 1333 succeeded by his uncle, Sir James' half-brother, Hugh the Dull, Lord of Douglas (c. 1294–1342)
  - In 1342 succeeded by Hugh's nephew (by Sir James' youngest half-brother Archibald), William Douglas, 1st Earl of Douglas, (1327–1384)
- Archibald the Grim (circa 1330–1400), Lord of Galloway succeeded his once removed cousin as Earl of Douglas in 1388.

By 1333 the 'bloody heart' was incorporated in the arms of Sir James' son, William, Lord of Douglas. It subsequently appeared, sometimes with a royal crown, in every branch of the Douglas family.

== Modern culture ==
=== Literature ===
- Sir James Douglas is the lead character in author Patricia Kennealy-Morrison's novella "The Last Voyage", which is collected in her short-story compilation "Tales of Spiral Castle".
- Sir James Douglas is the lead character of the novella, "The Knight" by Monica McCarty
- Sir James Douglas is a major character in author Nigel Tranter's Robert the Bruce trilogy. The trilogy focuses on King Robert the Bruce and the Scottish War of Independence.
- Sir James Douglas is the lead character in J. R. Tomlin's Black Douglas Trilogy. The trilogy focuses on Douglas's friendship with King Robert the Bruce and his part in the Scottish War of Independence.

=== Films ===
- Sir James Douglas is a character in the low-budget film The Bruce.
- Sir James Douglas was portrayed by Aaron Taylor-Johnson in the 2018's film Outlaw King. The film is a historical action drama, focusing on Robert the Bruce and the Scottish Wars of Independence.

=== Liquor ===
- "The Black Douglas" is an export market scotch whisky named in his honour.
- A popular real ale from the Broughton Brewery in the Scottish Borders also bears the name "Black Douglas". It carries the descriptive note, 'Dark and Bitter'.

=== Music ===
- "The Black Douglas" is a song that first appeared on the Corries' album, A Little of What You Fancy.

=== Railways ===
- "Black Douglas" was the name given to British Rail locomotive 87030.
- "Black Douglas" name now fitted to class 68 Locomotive, 68030, working for Transpennine trains.

Baronage of Scotland
Preceded by Sir William Douglas the Hardy	Lord of Douglas c. 1298–1330	Succeeded by William Douglas
