= Archibald of Douglas =

Scottish knight

Archibald of Douglas (died c. 1238) was the Abbot of Dunfermline Abbey (1178–1198) and a Scottish knight. He was the son of William I, Lord of Douglas.

== Life ==
The earliest attestation of his existence is in a charter of confirmation dated prior to 1198. This charter of Jocelin, Bishop of Glasgow, granted the rights of a toft in Glasgow to Melrose Abbey. Archibald's name appears between that of Alan, High Steward of Scotland and Robert de Montgomery. Also before 1198, Archibald appears in another document, again before 1198, in which he resigns the lands of Hailes held by him of the Abbey of Dunfermline, to Robert of Restalrig. Between 1214 and 1226, Archibald acquired the use of the lands of Hermiston and Livingston, with Maol Choluim I, Earl of Fife as his feudal superior. Archibald of Douglas must have been knighted before 1226 as he appears in another charter of Melrose Abbey as 'Dominus de Douglas' witnessing William Purves of Mospennoc granting the Monks of Melrose rights to pass through his lands. Another witness is Andrew, Archibald's knight which highlights his influential position. Archibald de Douglas appears as a signatory to several royal charters following 1226, and he appears to have spent a considerable time in Moray as episcopal charters of his brother Bricius de Douglas show. He was in the retinue of the King Alexander II, at Selkirk, in 1238 when the title Earl of Lennox was regranted to Maol Domhnaich of Lennox. Douglas disappears from historical record after 1239 and it is presumed that he died about this time.

== Marriage and issue ==
Archibald of Douglas is thought to have married Margaret, daughter of Sir John Crawford of Crawfordjohn and had issue:

- William of Douglas (c.1220–c.1274)

A second son; Andrew, is often attributed to Archibald of Douglas, although without primary evidence, arguably due to this Andrew's possession of the lands of Hermiston; said lands previously held by Archibald. However an Andrew de Douglas was a known Knight of Archibald de Douglas and never proven as his biological son. Recent Y-DNA research analysis published in 2013 by Alexandrina Murray, Administrator of the Murray Clan DNA Research Project and via the Douglas Y-DNA project at Family Tree DNA administered by Kirk Douglas, which results were discussed at the University of St Andrews Scotland Conference: Scotland and the Flemish People during May 2016. This Y-DNA research has proven that the haplogroup R1b descendants of Andrew Douglas of Hermiston do not match the known descendants of Archibald Douglas via Archibald's son William above haplogroup R1a, through the ennobled Scottish line of the Earls; Dukes and Marquess' of Queensberry line of Douglas.

Nor do they match the I2b1 Y-DNA haplogroup of the noble Douglas-Hamilton line the most senior Douglas family as Dukes of Hamilton, also noted in the historical literature as being descended from the original progenitor - William l de Douglas; 1140 -1214 circa.

Therefore, William Douglas and Andrew Douglas were definitely unrelated paternally if the published genealogical trees are correct, with Andrew de Douglas of Hermiston possibly receiving Hermiston lands as a reward due to his services as a Knight of Archibald de Douglas as argued by Alexandrina Murray.

Disputed son of Archibald de Douglas:

- Andrew Douglas of Hermiston, progenitor of the Lords of Dalkeith & Earls of Morton and Lords of Mains.

Baronage of Scotland
Preceded by William I, Lord of Douglas	Lord of Douglas c.1214–c.1240	Succeeded by William Longleg, Lord of Douglas
