= Capitulation of Irvine =

1297 conflict in the Wars of Scottish Independence

The Capitulation of Irvine was an early armed conflict of the Wars of Scottish Independence which took place on 7 June 1297. Due to dissension among the Scottish leadership, it resulted in a stand-off.

== Prelude ==
In May 1297, William Wallace killed William de Heselrig, the English High Sheriff of Lanark. At the time, it was not an isolated incident, although it is unclear whether this was a spontaneous occurrence or co-ordinated with other risings in Scotland. The story that Wallace was seeking revenge for the killing by Heselrig of his wife, Marion Braidfute of Lamington is derived from the poem by Blind Harry, The Actes and Deidis of the Illustre and Vallyeant Campioun Schir William Wallace.

Wallace then joined with William the Hardy, Lord of Douglas, and they carried out the raid of Scone. This was one of several rebellions taking place across Scotland, including those of several Scottish nobles and Andrew Moray in the north.

== Irvine ==
John de Warenne, 6th Earl of Surrey and Edward's warden in Scotland, sent his grandson, Henry de Percy, 1st Baron Percy with an army of 40,000 foot and 300 horse to deal with the insurrection.

On 9 July 1297, the nobles of Scotland gathered on the banks of a loch between Irvine and Bourtreehill House. They were prepared to go into battle against the approaching English forces and had made camp at Knadgerhill, on the north side of the loch. When the English arrived, they too camped on the side of the loch but on the opposite banks to the south.

However, dissension amongst the Scots leaders was so great that a knight, Sir Richard Lundie said that there was no safety in a host which was divided against itself, and went over with his men to join Percy. Robert the Bruce, Bishop Robert Wishart of Glasgow, William Douglas and others followed. Wallace was in central Scotland at the time.

Percy negotiated their submission, possibly at Seagate Castle, subduing southern Scotland for a while.

G.W.S. Barrow argues that the intention of the Scots nobles was to prolong negotiations with King Edward I of England, allowing William Wallace to organise his rebellion. Wallace refused to join in the submission and retreated with his followers to the forest of Selkirk. Wallace was particularly indignant with the Bishop of Glasgow, and attacked Wishart's castle and lands. Wishart himself was imprisoned for a time, and swore his fealty to Edward anew, only to break it as soon as he was released.

== Document ==
The Capitulations of Irvine, is housed in the National Archives, Kew Surrey, England.

== See also ==
- Capture of Berwick (1296)

== Sources ==
- Watson, Fiona (1998). Under the Hammer: Edward I and Scotland, 1286-1306. Tuckwell Press. pp. 39–42. ISBN 978-1-86232-020-8.
- Strawhorn, John (1986). The History of Irvine: Royal Burgh and New Town. J. Donald. ISBN 978-0-85976-140-6.
