= Stebbing =

Village in Essex, England

Coordinates: 51.8956°N 0.4095°E

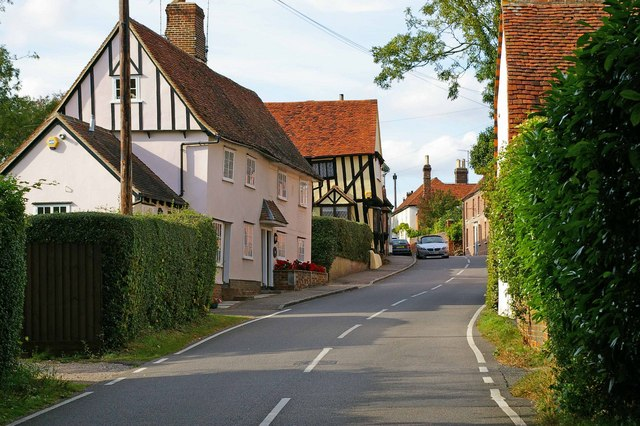
- Stebbing High Street

- Location within Essex
- Population: 1,465 (Parish, 2021)
- OS grid reference: TL677203
- District: Uttlesford
- Shire county: Essex
- Region: East
- Country: England
- Sovereign state: United Kingdom
- Post town: Dunmow
- Postcode district: CM6
- Dialling code: 01371
- Police: Essex
- Fire: Essex
- Ambulance: East of England
- UK Parliament: Saffron Walden

Stebbing is a village in the Uttlesford district of northern Essex, England. The village is situated north of the ancient Roman road Stane Street. It is 6 miles (9.7 km) from the nearest railway station (Braintree), and 8 mi (13 km) from nearest airport (London Stansted). The village has a pub and a bowling green. At the 2021 census the parish had a population of 1,465.

== History ==
Stebbing is mentioned in the Domesday Book of 1086:

"Henry de Ferrers holds Stebbing in demesne which Siward held as a manor and as two hides and 30 acres. Then and later two ploughs in demesne; now 3. Among the men then 4 ploughs now six and a half. There were six villans now eight. Then 16 bordars now 33."

Half a mile north-west of the church is The Mount, the moated earthwork identified as the remains of the medieval castle.

In the late 13th century the manor of Stebbing passed briefly to the Scottish noble house of Douglas by virtue of the marriage of William the Hardy, Lord of Douglas to Eleanor de Lovaine, the widow of William de Ferrers of Groby. Eleanor was a ward of Edward I, and had her late husband's manors of Stebbing and Woodham Ferrers made into a dowry for a future remarriage. Douglas absconded with Eleanor, when she was attending to her late husband's estates in Scotland, and married her c.1288. Douglas, a significant figure on the Scottish side during the First Scottish War of Independence, had his English manors finally forfeited by 1298 when he died of mistreatment in the Tower of London. His son Hugh Douglas had been captured previously at Stebbing in 1296, by the Sheriff of Essex.

== The church ==
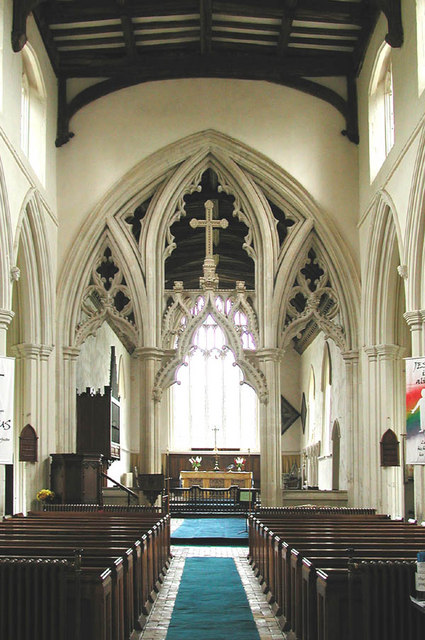
The unusual rood screen at St Mary the Virgin

The Grade I listed church was built mainly around 1360. An outstanding feature is the stone rood screen, one of only three that survive in Europe (the others are at Great Bardfield and in Trondheim). The earliest written record referring to the present church dates from 1377, when it was reported of Henry de Ferrers that he was “said to have been born in the Abbey of Tilty and baptised in the church of St. Mary the Virgin, Stebbing”. During work inside the church a few years ago part of the foundations of an earlier building were uncovered along with coins of King Henry II (1154 - 1189). During restoration work in 2010 remnants were discovered of medieval wall paintings.

== Governance ==
An electoral ward in the same name exists. This ward had a population of 1,560 at the 2011 census.

== Residents ==
The writer Henry De Vere Stacpoole lived in the village with his wife Margaret for over a decade, during which time he served the area as a justice of the peace. In 1922 they moved to the Isle of Wight.

== See also ==
- The Hundred Parishes
