= Douglas Water =

River in South Lanarkshire, Scotland

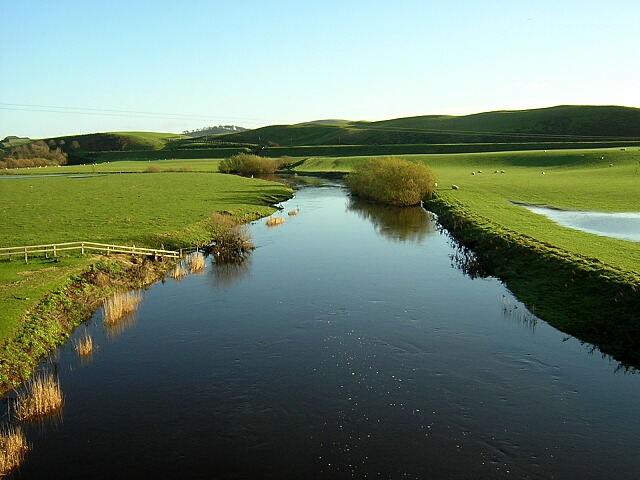
Douglas Water downstream of Douglasmouth Bridge.

The Douglas Water (Scottish Gaelic: Dùghlas) is a river in South Lanarkshire of south-central Scotland. It is a tributary of the River Clyde.

== Etymology ==
The river's name comes from the Gaelic dubh-ghlas or Brittonic dūβ-*glẹiss, both meaning either "black water" or "black stream".

== Course ==
The course of the Douglas Water is entirely within the South Lanarkshire council area.

The river rises in the hills which separate Lanarkshire from Ayrshire, to the south west of Muirkirk. The source is close to that of the River Ayr, which flows west to the sea, but the Douglas Water runs north-east then east, past Glespin and into Douglasdale. Here the river flows through the village of Douglas, and past the scant remains of Douglas Castle. The castle was a stronghold of the House of Douglas, a powerful medieval family who took their surname from the river. The A70 road follows the river through Douglasdale, and on to the Clyde.

East of Douglas, the river passes under the M74 motorway, just south of the Happendon services, and turns toward the north-east again. Below the village of Rigside, the smaller Poniel Burn flows into the Douglas Water. Beyond this confluence is the small village of Douglas Water. A dismantled railway line runs between the river and the A70 for the remaining 2 miles (3 kilometres) of its course. The Douglas Water flows into the Clyde around 3 mi (5 km) south of Lanark.
