= William Douglas, 6th Earl of Douglas =

Scottish nobleman

William, Earl of Douglas
- Duke of Touraine(de jure); Earl of Wigtown; Lord of Galloway; Lord of Bothwell, Selkirk and Ettrick Forest, Eskdale, Lauderdale, Liddesdale and Annandale; Count of Longueville (de jure); Lord of Dun-le-Roi (de jure)
- Arms of the 6th Earl of Douglas
- Predecessor: Archibald Douglas, 5th Earl of Douglas
- Successor: James Douglas, 7th Earl of Douglas
- Born: 1424; Scotland
- Died: 24 November 1440 (age 16) murdered at Edinburgh Castle
- Buried: 1440; St Bride's Kirk Douglas, South Lanarkshire
- Noble family: Douglas
- Spouse: Janet Lindsay
- Father: Archibald Douglas, 5th Earl of Douglas
- Mother: Euphemia Graham

William, 6th Earl of Douglas (c. 1424 – 24 November 1440) was a Scottish nobleman. In addition to his Earldom of Douglas, he was Earl of Wigtown, Lord of Galloway, Lord of Bothwell, Selkirk and Ettrick Forest, Eskdale, Lauderdale, and Annandale in Scotland, and de jure Duke of Touraine, Count of Longueville, and Lord of Dun-le-roi in France. He was the eldest son of Archibald Douglas, 5th Earl of Douglas, and Lady Eupheme Graham.

He married Lady Janet Lindsay, daughter of David, Earl of Crawford, and succeeded to the earldom on the death of his father, who had served as regent of James II. Following Archibald Douglas's death, Sir William Crichton, Sir Alexander Livingston of Callendar, and James Douglas, Earl of Avondale (William Douglas's great-uncle) shared power. Together they conspired to break the power of the late Archibald Douglas's family, and summoned William and his younger brother David to Edinburgh Castle. The so-called 'Black Dinner' which followed saw the two boys summarily beheaded on trumped-up charges, over the protests of the young King James II.

The lordships of Annandale and Bothwell fell to the crown; Galloway to Margaret Douglas (William Douglas's sister), and the Douglas lands and earldom passed to William's great-uncle James Douglas, the Earl of Avondale, who was accordingly seen later as the main perpetrator.

== In popular culture ==
- S. R. Crockett based his book, The Black Douglas on the death of William.
- His death at the "Black Dinner" served as one of the inspirations for "The Red Wedding" in George R. R. Martin's A Song of Ice and Fire.

Peerage of Scotland
Preceded by Archibald Douglas	Earl of Douglas; 1439–1440	Succeeded by James Douglas
