= William le Hardi, Lord of Douglas =

Scottish nobleman and soldier

William Douglas
- Lord of Douglas
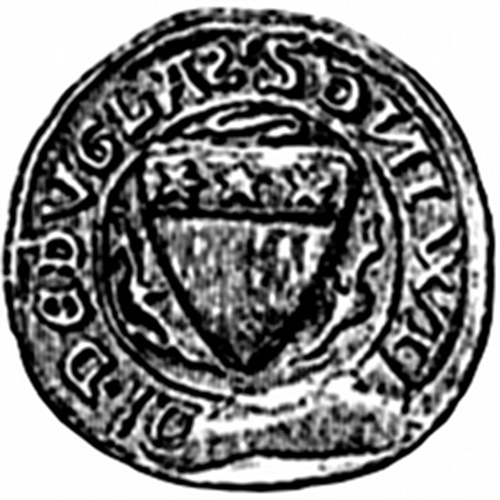
- Seal of William the Hardy
- Predecessor: William Longleg, Lord of Douglas
- Successor: Sir James Douglas
- Born: 1243; Douglas, South Lanarkshire, Scotland
- Died: 24 January 1298 (aged 54-55); Tower of London, England
- Noble family: Clan Douglas
- Spouses: Elizabeth Stewart; Eleanor de Lovaine
- Issue: Sir James Douglas; Sir Archibald Douglas; Hugh Douglas
- Father: William Longleg, Lord of Douglas
- Mother: Constance of Fawdon

Arms of William the Hardy

Sir William Douglas "le Hardi" ("the Bold"), Lord of Douglas (1243 – c. 1298) was a Scottish nobleman and soldier.

== Early life ==
William Douglas was the son of William Longleg, Lord of Douglas and it is supposed by his possible second wife, Constance Battail of Fawdon. However, Fraser claims that he bought Fawdon from the Battails, when it is recorded in legal records that he purchased it from Gilbert de Umberville, Earl of Angus which puts her origins into question. He first is recorded at an Assize at Newcastle-upon-Tyne in 1256, when his father made over a Carucate of land at Warndon, Northumberland to him. Douglas' father William Longleg was also Lord of Fawdon, and had as his superior Gilbert de Umfraville, Earl of Angus. In 1264, Longleg was acquitted of withholding rents by a jury, but in 1267, Umfraville notwithstanding attacked Fawdon, imprisoned Longleg at Harbottle Castle and made off with some £100 sterling of goods. William Douglas was seriously injured in the fight defending his father's home. Ita quod fere amputaverunt caput ejus (So as to nearly cut off his head).

=== Eighth Crusade ===
Sir William Fraser puts forward a theory that David Hume of Godscroft is mistaken about the William Douglas that went crusading, and suggests that it is this William Douglas, the son the rather than the father, who accompanied David I Strathbogie, Earl of Atholl, and other Scots nobility on the Eighth Crusade in 1270, as recorded by John of Fordun in his Chronica Gentis Scotorum. Fraser also concedes that there is no existing evidence left to verify this, except the reference in Godscroft's work. However, by that time the father was already in his fifties which makes his going seem less plausible as well.

== Lord of Douglas ==
Douglas' father, Longleg died at some point c. 1274 and there is some confusion as to whether his eldest son Hugh predeceased him, however William le Hardi was certainly in possession of his estates by the end of the decade. Douglas was knighted before 1288, when he was called upon by Sir Andrew Moray, to imprison his uncle, Sir Hugh de Abernethy at Douglas Castle. Abernethy had been party to the murder of Donnchadh III, Earl of Fife, one of the six Guardians of Scotland. Abernethy died in custody despite attempts by Edward I of England to have him released.

In 1289, Douglas requested the release of certain family charters from Richard, Abbot of Kelso. These charters had been kept at the Priory of Lesmahagow, a daughter house of the Tironensian Abbey of Kelso, for safety. In the receipt for these documents, Douglas styled himself Dominus de Duglas, Lord of Douglas, the first time the title had been recorded.

== Marriages ==
=== Elizabeth Stewart ===
Douglas married Elizabeth, daughter of Alexander Stewart, 4th High Steward of Scotland, by whom he had his eldest son James. Elizabeth Stewart appears to have died before the end of 1288, possibly in childbirth.

=== Eleanor de Lovaine ===
Later in 1288, William Douglas and a Borders Knight known as John Wishart surrounded the Castle of Fa'side near Tranent. The castle was held by Alan la Zouche, 1st Baron la Zouche of Ashby, feudal superior of the barony of Tranent. Within the Castle was Zouche's wife Eleanor, and another woman named Eleanor, the widow wife of William de Ferrers of Groby, second son of William de Ferrers, 5th Earl of Derby. Eleanor Ferrers was the daughter of Matthew de Lovaine, a great grandson himself of Godfrey III, Count of Louvain. King Edward had provided a handsome dowry from her husband's English lands following his death. He had also possessed lands in five counties in Scotland, and Eleanor had come north to collect her rents. Rather than despoliate the land and the castle, Douglas contented himself by abducting Eleanor and removing her to Douglas Castle. No one has ever explained how he mysteriously managed to remove her from within a castle under siege which was not taken by his forces.

==== Reaction to the abduction ====
William Douglas was imprisoned and fined for the abduction, but also granted permission to marry his captive. Eleanor and Douglas were wed soon afterwards. King Edward and ordered the Sheriff of Northumberland to seize all Douglas possessions in that county and to apprehend Douglas and Wishart if the chance arose. Edward also demanded that the Guardians of Scotland immediately arrest Douglas and deliver him and Eleanor to his pleasure. The Guardians did not respond. Douglas was connected to two of the Guardians: James Stewart, 5th High Steward of Scotland was his brother-in-law, and Alexander Comyn, Earl of Buchan was a brother-in-law of Eleanor de Lovaine. Furthermore, the Guardians may not have reacted well to the peremptory nature of the English king's request.

== First Imprisonment ==
However, Douglas seems to have fallen into the hands of the English monarch in early 1290 and was confined at Knaresborough Castle. His imprisonment does not appear to have been unduly harsh, he was released by the spring of 1290 when his wife Eleanor posted bail for his release with four manucaptors in May 1290, these four knights, all her cousins, were John Hastings, 1st Baron Hastings, Nicholas de Segrave, 1st Baron Segrave, William de Rye and Robert Bardulf. He was in favour with Edward again and he and Wishart had their Northumbrian lands restored to them. Eleanor Douglas was fined £100 sterling, and by way of payment had some of her manors in Essex and Herefordshire taken by the crown in 1296.

== Build up to War ==
Douglas' seal is on the Treaty of Salisbury approving the putative marriage between Margaret, Maid of Norway with Edward of Caernarfon, and was amongst those nobles that hammered out the deal that would become the Treaty of Birgham. At Norham, in June 1291, the Guardians accepted King Edward as Lord Paramount of Scotland. Whilst the negotiations were progressing, regarding the choice of the next King of Scots, Edward was staying with Sir Walter de Lindsay at Thurston Manor, near Innerwick, when William Douglas paid an oath of fealty to him in the chapel there.

By the end of 1291, Douglas had fallen again into disfavour and had his lands of Douglasdale forfeited to the English King. Edward appointed his own baronial officers and made one Master Eustace de Bikerton, Parson of St Bride's Kirk, the spiritual home and burying ground of the Douglases.

John Balliol was declared King of Scots on 17 November 1292, and called his first parliament on 10 February 1293. Douglas along with Robert de Brus, Earl of Carrick, Aonghus Mór mac Domhnaill, Lord of Islay, John, Earl of Caithness failed to attend and were proclaimed defaulters. Douglas attended the second parliament of King John, but was imprisoned again for failing to comply with royal officers enforcing a judgement against him, and imprisoning said officers in Douglas Castle. In prison, Douglas was duty bound to be at his lands in Essex, in order to provide service for Edward, his failure cost him £20 sterling in fines.

== Siege of Berwick ==
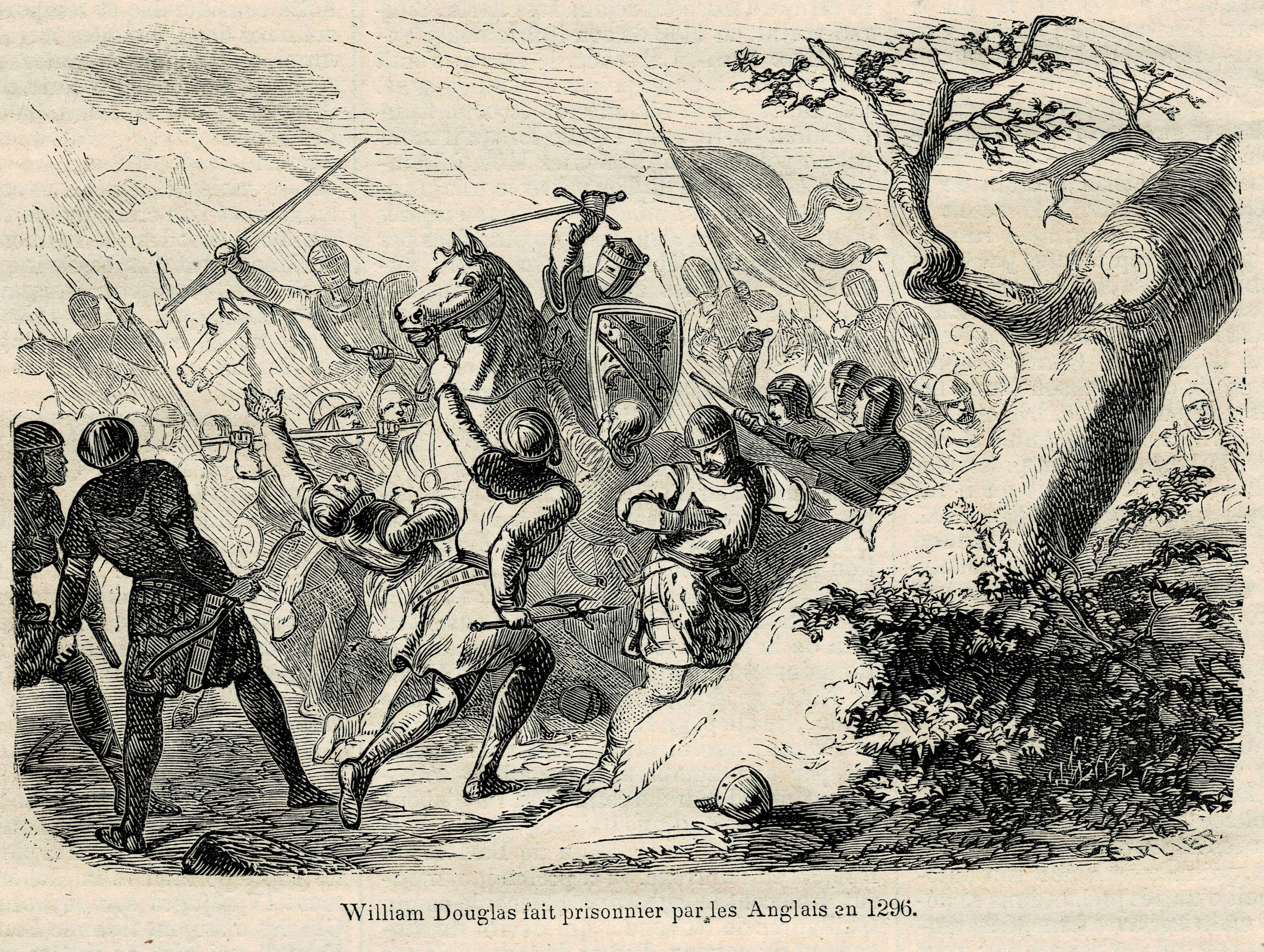
Douglas taken prisoner by the English in 1296 (illustration by Gustave Gerlier, 1863)

Upset at the humiliations heaped upon John Balliol and the ineffectiveness of his rule, a new Guardianship was created in 1295. These men concluded a treaty at Paris and ratified it at Dunfermline between the Kingdoms of Scotland, France and Norway, that would become known as the Auld Alliance. Douglas siding with his countrymen, was appointed Governor of Berwick upon Tweed, the most important commercial centre in Scotland at the time. When the Guardians threw down the gauntlet to Edward, he arrived at the walls of Berwick with 5,000 Cavalry and 30,000 Infantry. There followed one of the most brutal episodes in British history, the Sack of Berwick. The English army took the town by storm on Good Friday 1296 and gave no quarter to the inhabitants. The slaughter lasted for two days and the estimated death toll was between 7,500 and 8,500 men women and children. Appalled and after a resolute defence, the garrison of Berwick Castle under the leadership of William Douglas, gave themselves up to the mercy of King Edward. The garrison were freed and were allowed to march out of the castle with their arms, but Douglas was imprisoned and the last of his estates in Essex forfeit. (Douglas' two-year-old son Hugh had been taken into ward by the Sheriff of Essex at Stebbing, one of the forfeited properties)

== Ragman Roll ==
Douglas was imprisoned in the Hog's Tower at Berwick castle and stayed there until gaining his freedom by appending his seal to the Ragman Roll, in common with the majority of the Scots nobility. Within days of his swearing his new oath of Fealty to Edward, Douglas was restored to his lands in Scotland, but not those in England. To add salt to the wound, Douglas' Land at Fawdon and others in Northumberland were made over to his old foe Gilbert de Umfraville, Earl of Angus, Douglas had no reluctance in joining the patriotic party.

The Umfravilles' latterly forfeited Earldom of Angus was granted in 1389 to Douglas' great-grandson, George Douglas, 1st Earl of Angus.

== Uprising of William Wallace ==
Following the Battle of Dunbar, a large section of the Scots nobility were languishing in prison in England. The countryside was fomenting and there was talk of a new champion for the Scots people, William Wallace of Elderslie had started his campaign and Andrew de Moray had begun a campaign in the north, starting with retaking his father's castle. Douglas was summoned to attend King Edward in London on 7 July 1297, with fifty other barons to accompany him on an expedition to Flanders to aid Guy of Dampierre, Count of Flanders against Philip le Bel King of France. Douglas refused and joined company with Wallace. Most Scots magnates thought that Wallace was beneath their dignity, but Douglas had no such compunction. He was the first nobleman to join with Sir William Wallace in 1297 in rebellion; combining forces at Sanquhar, Durisdeer and later Scone Abbey where the two liberated the English treasury. With that booty Wallace financed further rebellion. Wallace joined his forces with that of Sir Andrew Moray and together they led the patriot army in the Battle at Stirling Bridge fought on 11 September 1297. They were joined by other patriots such as Robert Wishart Bishop of Glasgow, and the Morays of Bothwell, with a contingent of Douglases at the national muster at Irvine, North Ayrshire.

== Bruce raid on Douglas Castle ==
When Edward heard of Douglas' supposed treason he commanded the future King of Scots Robert Bruce, Earl of Carrick, then governor of Carlisle for the English to take retribution. Bruce swept into Douglasdale at the king's order. However, young Bruce, who was twenty-two years old at the time, stated, "I must join my own people and the nation in which I was born." He then was joined by the men of Douglas and Lady Douglas, proceeding to join the rebels at Irvine.

== Capitulation of Irvine ==
The third time Douglas was held a prisoner of King Edward, was after 9 July 1297 when he was accused by Sir Henry de Percy of breaking his covenant of peace with Edward that was agreed to in the document known as the Capitulation at Irving Water, where Douglas was in the company of Robert Brus, Alexander de Lindsay and John and James (the latter three his brothers in law). By the time Sir Andrew de Moray and William Wallace won their great victory at Stirling, Sir William the Hardy was again Edward's prisoner at Berwick Castle; staying in what was now called 'Douglas Tower'.

== Death ==
Following Wallace's success at Stirling Bridge the English fled Berwick on Tweed with Douglas and another Scottish prisoner Thomas de Morham; both were later committed to the Tower of London on 12 October 1297 with Douglas meeting his end there on 24 January 1298 due to mistreatment.

== Issue ==
William the Hardy was twice married and had three sons.

By Elizabeth, daughter of Alexander Stewart, 4th High Steward of Scotland:

- Sir James Douglas (also known as Good Sir James and the Black Douglas, ancestor of the "Black Douglases", including the 3rd to 9th Earls of Douglas).

By Eleanor de Lovaine of Groby, daughter-in-law of William de Ferrers, 5th Earl of Derby and great-great-granddaughter of Godfrey III of Leuven:

- Hugh Douglas,
- Sir Archibald Douglas (ancestor of the "Red Douglas" Earls of Angus, Marquesses of Douglas and Duke of Douglas).

Baronage of Scotland
Preceded by William "Longleg"	Lord of Douglas c. 1274 – c. 1298	Succeeded by Sir James Douglas
