= William IV, Lord of Douglas =

Scottish noble

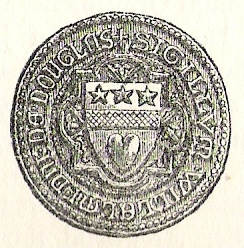
Seal of William, Lord of Douglas

William, Lord of Douglas (died 19 July 1333) was a short-lived Scottish nobleman, the son of Sir James Douglas and an unknown mother. Little is known of Lord Douglas's life which, after his father's death in Spain in 1330, he spent under the guardianship of Sir Archibald Douglas.

There are records of transactions occurring in the exchequer accounts of the Lord Chamberlain of Scotland in 1331 that refer to Willelmus dominus de Duglas. There is also a record of a complaint by the monks of Coldingham Priory to David II against the Lord of Douglas and his uncle Sir Archibald, in respect of certain manorial lands at Swinton, Berwickshire. In this the monks claimed that the lands had been given to Lord Douglas' father, Sir James, illegally and with prejudice against the priory at Coldingham.

William of Douglas accompanied his uncle, who had been appointed Guardian of the Realm, to the battlefield of Halidon Hill. There, with his uncle, six belted earls and countless knights and commoners, he was slain. He died unmarried and a minor. The title and privileges of the Lordship of Douglas passed to another uncle, Hugh "the Dull", a Canon of Glasgow and parson of Roxburgh who turned much of the Douglas patrimony over to his cousin William Douglas of Lothian.

In 1778, excavations at the Auld Kirk at North Berwick uncovered the matrix of the seal of William, Lord Douglas. This seal stamp shows the first representation of the heart of Bruce in Douglas heraldry, and shows that it was assumed immediately after the death of Sir James Douglas.

Baronage of Scotland
Preceded by Sir James Douglas, Lord of Douglas	Lord of Douglas c. 1330 – c. 1333	Succeeded by Hugh the Dull
