= William of Douglas =

Scottish noble

Sir William Douglas (c. 1220 – c 1289), known as 'Longleg', was a Scottish knight. He was the son of Archibald I, Lord of Douglas.

The years of the minority of King Alexander III (1249–1262) featured an embittered struggle for the control of affairs between two rival parties, the one led by the nationalistic Walter Comyn, Earl of Menteith, the other by pro-English Alan Durward, Justiciar of Scotia. The former dominated the early years of Alexander's reign. In 1255, an interview between the English and Scottish kings at Kelso led to Menteith and his party losing to Durward's party. Later, both parties called a meeting of the great Magnates of the Realm to establish a regency until Alexander came of age. The Lord of Douglas was one of the magnates called to witness. Douglas was a partisan of Durward's party. This can be explained by the fact that although most of his territories lay in Douglasdale, through his wife, Constance, he had obtained the rich Manor of Fawdon in Northumberland and it would do well to keep English royal favour.

David Hume of Godscroft, the arch-panegyricist of the House of Douglas, states that Longleg married Marjorie, Countess of Carrick, and had by her two sons and a daughter, the daughter inheriting the Earldom of Carrick. Marjorie went on to marry Robert de Brus, father to King Robert I of Scotland; this, however, does not make any sense historically.

William Longleg married Constance Battail of Fawdon, and had two sons and a daughter:

- Hugh I, Lord of Douglas (died c. 1259)
- William the Hardy, Lord of Douglas (1240–1298)
- Willelma de Douglas (d. 1302)

Baronage of Scotland
Preceded by Archibald I, Lord of Douglas	Lord of Douglas c. 1240 – c. 1274	Succeeded by Sir William Douglas the Hardy
