= Hugh the Dull, Lord of Douglas =

Scottish noble

Hugh the Dull (1294 – between 1333 and 1346) was Lord of Douglas, a Scottish nobleman and cleric.

The second son of William the Hardy, Lord of Douglas, William Wallace's companion in arms, and Eleanor Ferrers. Hugh's elder brother was Sir James Douglas, a hero of the Wars of Independence, and his younger was Sir Archibald Douglas, Guardian of the realm, and Scots commander at the Battle of Halidon Hill.

== Early life ==
Hugh of Douglas is first heard of in 1296. Following the forfeiture of his father's English possessions, the two-year-old Hugh was taken into custody at Stebbing in Essex, one of his father's manors.

Nothing further is heard of him until 1325 when he appeared by proxy as a canon of Glasgow Cathedral during a meeting of Chapter. He appears to have been at this time parish priest of Roxburgh.

== Titular Lord of Douglas ==
The death of his nephew William, Lord of Douglas, and brother Sir Archibald at Halidon Hill left the succession of the patrimony of Douglas to Hugh. However, Scotland at this time was going through the paroxysms of the Second War of Independence, and Edward III and Edward Balliol controlled much of the south of the country. Balliol, having paid homage for his kingdom to Edward, had also ceded to the Crown of England, in perpetuity, the Forests of Selkirk, Ettrick and Jedburgh, and the shires of Roxburgh, Peebles, Dumfries, Linlithgow, Edinburgh and Haddington - in essence, all the territories in which the Lord of Douglas held property. Edward had re-appointed Douglasdale to Robert de Clifford, 3rd Baron de Clifford, grandson of Robert de Clifford, 1st Baron de Clifford, who had been granted it by Edward I of England following his dissolution of the Kingdom of Scots in 1296. Clifford never got to enjoy his new properties, by way of stout resistance from the men of Douglas led by William Douglas of Lothian.

Hugh the Dull had probably escaped to France to the court of David II at Château Gaillard in 1337. Here it was that his young nephews William Douglas, 1st Earl of Douglas and Archibald Douglas, 3rd Earl of Douglas had sought refuge. Certainly by that date, Edward III had appointed Andrew de Ormiston as prebend of Hugh's parish of Roxburgh.

== The Knight of Liddesdale ==
By 1337, William Douglas of Lothian, using the same guerrilla tactics employed by Hugh's brother James, had carved out a power base in the Borders and had styled himself Lord of Liddesdale. It is assumed that the Lord of Douglas, no warrior, had given executive control of the Douglas territories in the south to him. In 1342, Liddesdale, hankering after formal power, coerced the Lord of Douglas into resigning the majority of the rest of the Douglas territories over to him with all administrative powers pertaining. Hugh of Douglas resigned his lordship in favour of his nephew William, still in France, making him Ward of Liddesdale.

== Legacy and death ==
Douglas dedicated a church to St John the Baptist at Crookboat, three miles south of Lanark, where the Douglas Water meets the Clyde. Amongst other endowments to this establishment, he granted the priest the right to the best cheese in every house on Douglas Moor. Hugh of Douglas retired to his parish duties at Roxburgh. He died in relative obscurity at an unknown date; following the Battle of Durham that year, Edward III controlled southern Scotland once more, and his parish was given to one William de Emeldon.

Hugh, Lord of Douglas, was a singular figure in the warlike tribe to which he belonged. His perhaps unfair epithet has probably more to do with the fact that he was a priest, which had him lead a more retiring life than the rest of his family. Certainly, there were no clerics amongst the immediate families of the Chief of Douglas until the 1440s.

Baronage of Scotland
Preceded by William, Lord of Douglas	Lord of Douglas; 1333–c.1342	Succeeded by William, 1st Earl of Douglas
