= Duke of Clarence and Avondale =

Royal dukedom in the Peerage of the United Kingdom

Dukedom of Clarence and Avondale
- Arms of the Duke of Clarence and Avondale
- Creation date: 24 May 1890
- Creation: First
- Created by: Victoria
- Peerage: Peerage of the United Kingdom
- First holder: Prince Albert Victor
- Last holder: Prince Albert Victor
- Remainder to: the 1st Duke's heirs male of the body lawfully begotten
- Subsidiary titles: Earl of Athlone
- Status: Extinct
- Extinction date: 14 January 1892

Duke of Clarence and Avondale was a title awarded to Prince Albert Victor, a grandson of Queen Victoria, in the Peerage of the United Kingdom.

Whilst there had previously been several creations of Dukes of Clarence (and one Duke of Clarence and St Andrews), the sole creation of a dukedom of Clarence and Avondale was for Albert Victor, the eldest son of the Prince of Wales (later King Edward VII). This was the last royal dukedom to be created with two territorial designations. The title "Avondale" refers to the valley of the Avon Water, Scotland.

The Duke died of pneumonia in 1892 before his planned marriage so the title became extinct. He is buried in the Albert Memorial Chapel adjoining St George's Chapel, Windsor, beneath an Art Nouveau memorial designed by Sir Alfred Gilbert.

== Duke of Clarence and Avondale (1890) ==
Duke	Portrait	Birth	Marriage(s)	Death
Prince Albert Victor; House of Saxe-Coburg and Gotha; 1890–1892 also: Earl of Athlone (1890)	Prince Albert Edward	8 January 1864; Frogmore House son of King Edward VII and Queen Alexandra	Never married	14 January 1892; Sandringham House, Sandringham aged 28
Albert Victor had no children and all his titles became extinct on his death.

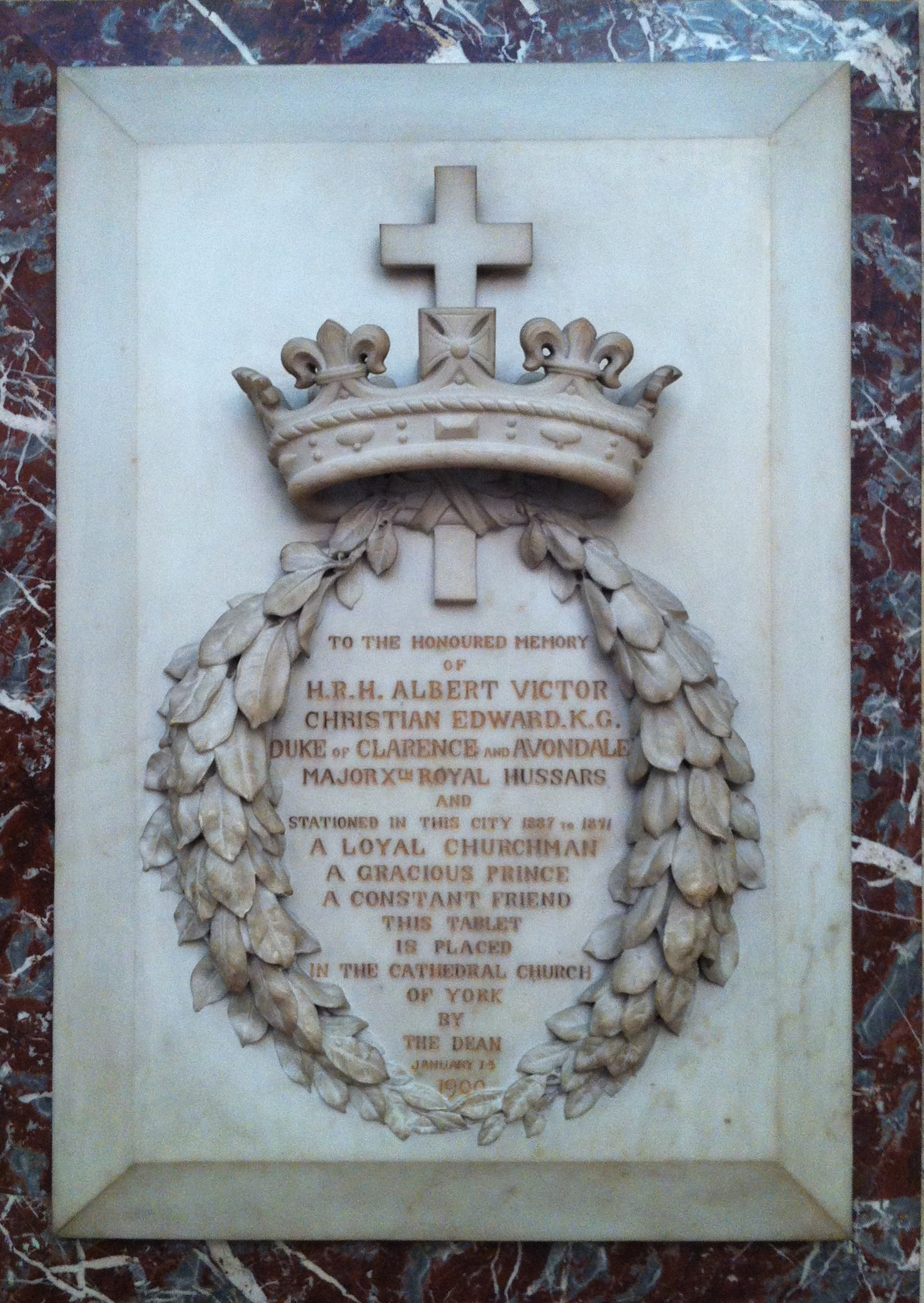
Memorial to the Duke of Clarence and Avondale in York Minster

== Family tree ==
Family Tree of the Dukes of Clarence, Clarence and Avondale, and Clarence and St Andrews

Edward III; 1312–1377; King of England
Duke of Clarence (1st creation), 1362
Lionel of Antwerp; 1338–1368; Duke of Clarence	Edmund of Langley; 1341–1402	John of Gaunt; 1340–1399; Duke of Lancaster
Dukedom (1st creation) extinct, 1368
Philippa; 1355–1382; Countess of Ulster	Henry IV; 1367–1413; King of England
Duke of Clarence (2nd creation), 1412
Roger Mortimer; 1374–1398; Earl of March	Thomas of Lancaster; 1388–1421; Duke of Clarence
Dukedom (2nd creation) extinct, 1421
Anne de Mortimer; 1390–1411	Richard of Conisburgh; 1385–1415
Richard of York; 1411–1460; Duke of York
Duke of Clarence (3rd creation), 1461
Edward IV; 1442–1483; King of England	George Plantagenet; 1449–1478; Duke of Clarence
Dukedom (3rd creation) extinct, 1478
Elizabeth of York; 1466–1503	Henry VII; 1457–1509; King of England
Princess Margaret Tudor; 1489–1541	James IV; King of Scotland
James V 1512–1542; King of Scotland
Mary; 1542–1587; Queen of Scotland
James VI & I 1566–1625; King of Scotland and England
Frederick V of the Palatinate	Princess Elizabeth Stuart; 1596–1662
Sophia of Hanover; 1630–1714	Ernest Augustus of Brunswick
George I 1660–1727; King of Great Britain
George II; 1683–1760; King of Great Britain
Prince Frederick Louis; 1707–1751; Prince of Wales
George III; 1738–1820; King of the United Kingdom
Duke of Clarence and St Andrews, 1789
Prince William Henry; 1765–1837; Duke of Clarence and St Andrews later King of the United Kingdom	Prince Edward; 1767–1820; Duke of Kent and Strathearn
Dukedom merged into the Crown, 1830
Victoria; 1819–1901; Queen of the United Kingdom
Earl of Clarence, 1881
Edward VII; 1841–1910; King of the United Kingdom	Prince Leopold; 1853–1884; Duke of Albany; 1st Earl of Clarence
Duke of Clarence and Avondale, 1890
Prince Albert Victor; 1864–1892; Duke of Clarence and Avondale	Charles Edward; 1884–1954; Duke of Saxe-Coburg and Gotha; Duke of Albany; 2nd Earl of Clarence
Dukedom extinct, 1892	Honours forfeit, 1919

Family tree of the: Earls of Angus, Earls of Avondale, Earls of Douglas, Marquesses of Douglas, Earls of Forfar, Earls of Ormond and Marquesses of Ormond, Earls of Ross and Dukes of Ross

Earl of Angus (Stewart line) and Lord of Bonkyl, 1329
John Stewart d. 1331; 1st Earl of Angus, etc., Lord of Abernethy jure uxoris	William the Hardy; 1243–1298; Lord of Douglas
Thomas Stewart b. before 1331–1361; 2nd Earl of Angus, etc.	Archibald Douglas d. 1333	James Douglas "the Good" c. 1286–1330; Lord of Douglas
Earl of Douglas, 1358
Robert III c. 1337–1406; King of Scotland	Margaret Stewart d. 1417; 3rd Countess of Angus, etc.	William Douglas c. 1323–1384; 1st Earl of Douglas	Archibald Douglas "the Grim" c. 1330 – c. 1400; 3rd Earl of Douglas, Earl of Wigtown, Lord of Galloway, Lord of Douglas, Lord of Bothwell
Earl of Angus transferred from the Stewarts to the Douglasses when Margaret resigned her title in deference to her son, 1389	Earl of Avondale and Lord Balveny, 1437
James I 1394–1437; King of Scotland	Mary Stewart c. 1380–c. 1460	George Douglas; 1380–1430; 1st Earl of Angus, etc.	James Douglas c. 1358–1388; 2nd Earl of Douglas, Earl of Mar	Archibald Douglas "Tyneman" c. 1369–1424; Duke of Touraine, 4th Earl of Douglas, Earl of Wigtown, 13th Lord of Douglas, Lord of Galloway, Lord of Douglas, Lord of Bothwell m. Margaret of Carrick, daughter of Robert III	James Douglas; 1371–1443; 7th Earl of Douglas, 1st Earl of Avondale, etc.
William Douglas; 1398–1437; 2nd Earl of Angus, etc.	Douglases of Drumlanrig	Archibald Douglas c. 1391–1439; Duke of Touraine, 5th Earl of Douglas, Earl of Wigtown, Lord of Galloway, Lord of Douglas, Lord of Bothwell, Lord of Selkirk and Ettrick Forest, Eskdale, Lauderdale, Liddesdale and Annandale, Count of Longueville, Seigneur de Dun-le-roi
Earl of Ormond (Scotland) (1st creation), 1445
James II; 1430–1460; King of Scotland	James Douglas; 1428–1446; 3rd Earl of Angus, etc.	George Douglas c. 1427–1463; 4th Earl of Angus, etc.	William Douglas c. 1424–1440; Duke of Touraine, 6th Earl of Douglas, Earl of Wigtown, Lord of Galloway, Lord of Bothwell, Lord of Selkirk and Ettrick Forest, Eskdale, Lauderdale, and Annandale, Count of Longueville, Seigneur de Dun-le-roi	William Douglas; 1425–1452; 8th Earl of Douglas, 2nd Earl of Avondale, etc.	James Douglas; 1426–1491; 9th Earl of Douglas, 3rd Earl of Avondale, etc.	Hugh Douglas d. 1455; Earl of Ormond
Earldom of Douglas and Earldom of Avondale forfeit, 1491	Eardom of Ormand forfeit, 1455
James III; 1451/1452–1448; King of Scotland	Archibald Douglas c. 1449–1513; 5th Earl of Angus, etc.
Marquess of Ormond (Scotland) (1st creation), 1476; Earl of Ross, 1481; Duke of Ross, 1488
James IV; 1473–1513; King of Scotland	James Stewart; 1476–1504; Duke of Ross, etc.	George Douglas; 1469–1513 styled Master of Angus	William Douglas of Glenbervie; 1473–1513
Dukedom of Ross (1488 creation), Marqessate of Ormond (1st creation) and Earldom of Ross (1481 creation) extinct, 1504
Duke of Ross (2nd creation), 1514
James V 1512–1542; King of Scotland	Alexander Stewart; 1514–1515; Duke of Ross	Archibald Douglas; 1490–1557; 6th Earl of Angus, etc.	George Douglas of Pittendreich d. 1552	Archibald Douglas of Glenbervie; 1513–1570
Dukedom of Ross (2nd creation) extinct, 1515	Earl of Ross (1565 creation)
Mary; 1542–1587; Queen of Scotland	Henry Stuart; 1546–1567; Duke of Albany, 1st Earl of Ross, Lord Darnley, Lord Ardmannoch	David Douglas c. 1515–1558; 7th Earl of Angus, etc.	William Douglas; 1533–1591; 9th Earl of Angus, etc.
James VI and I 1566–1625; 2nd Earl of Ross, later King of Scotland	Archibald Douglas; 1555–1588; 8th Earl of Angus, etc., Earl of Morton	William Douglas; 1553–1611; 10th Earl of Angus, etc.
Earldom of Ross (1565 creation), merged with the crown
Marquess of Ormond (Scotland) (2nd creation), Earl of Ross, and Lord Ardmannoch, 1600	Earldom of Angus (1389 creation) resigned in favor of: Marquess of Douglas, Earl of Angus, Lord Abernethy, Lord Bonkyll and Preston, Lord Abernethy, and Lord Jedburgh Forest, 1633
Elizabeth Stuart; 1596–1662	Charles Stuart; 1600–1649; Marquess of Ormond, etc., Later King Charles I of England and Scotland	William Douglas; 1589–1660; 1st Marquess of Douglas, etc. 11th Earl of Angus, etc. (1389 creation)
Marquessate of Ormand (2nd creation) and Earldom of Ross (1600 creation) merged with the Crown, 1625
Earl of Ormond (Scotland) (2nd creation), 1651
Sophia of Hanover; 1630–1714	Archibald Douglas; 1609–1655; 1st Earl of Ormond
Earl of Forfar (1st creation), 1661
King George I 1660–1727	James Douglas c. 1646–1700; 2nd Marquess of Douglas, etc.	Archibald Douglas; 1653–1712; 2nd Earl of Ormond, 1st Earl of Forfar
Duke of Douglas, Marquess of Angus and Abernethy, Viscount of Jedburgh Forest, Lord Douglas of Bonkill, Prestoun, and Robertoun, 1703
King George II; 1683–1760	Archibald Douglas; 1694–1761; 1st Duke of Douglas, etc., 3rd Marquess of Douglas, etc.	Archibald Douglas; 1692–1715; 3rd Earl of Ormond, 2nd Earl of Forfar
Dukedom of Douglas, marquessate of Angus and Abernethy, and viscountcy of Jedburgh Forest, lordship Douglas of Bonkill, Prestoun, and Robertoun extinct, 1761; Marquessate of Douglas, earldom of Angus, and lordship of Abernethy and Jedburgh Forest passed to James Hamilton, 7th Duke of Hamilton	Earldoms of Ormond and Forfar extinct, 1715
Frederick; 1707–1751; Prince of Wales
King George III; 1683–1760
Edward Augustus; 1767–1820; Duke of Kent and Strathearn
Queen Victoria; 1819–1901
King Edward VII; 1841–1910
Duke of Clarence and Avondale and Earl of Athlone, 1890
Prince Albert Victor; 1864–1892; Duke of Clarence and Avondale, etc.	King George V 1865–1936
Dukedom of Clarence and Avondale and Earldom of Athlone extinct, 1892
King George VI; 1895–1952
Queen Elizabeth II; 1926–2022
Earl of Forfar (2nd creation), 2019
Prince Edward b. 1964; Duke of Edinburgh, Earl of Forfar
