= Earl of Forfar =

Title of Scottish nobility

Earldom of Forfar held with Earldom of Wessex
- Arms of Prince Edward, in Scotland, the present Earl of Forfar
- Creation date: 10 March 2019
- Creation: Second
- Created by: Elizabeth II
- Peerage: Peerage of the United Kingdom
- First holder: Lord Archibald Douglas
- Present holder: Prince Edward, Duke of Edinburgh
- Heir apparent: James, Earl of Wessex
- Remainder to: the 1st Earl's heirs male of the body lawfully begotten
- Status: Extant
- Seat: Bagshot Park

Earl of Forfar is a title that has been created twice, once in the Peerage of Scotland and once in the Peerage of the United Kingdom. The name of the earldom refers to Forfar, the county town of Angus, Scotland. The current holder is Prince Edward, son of Elizabeth II and brother of Charles III.

== History ==
The title was first created in 1661 in the Peerage of Scotland as a subsidiary title to the Earldom of Ormond. This first creation of the title became extinct in 1715.

The dignity of Earl of Forfar in the Peerage of the United Kingdom was granted in 2019 to Prince Edward, Earl of Wessex, on the occasion of his 55th birthday. This earldom was given in addition to the two titles (Earl of Wessex and Viscount Severn) that he received on his wedding day and afforded Prince Edward and his wife Sophie a Scottish title to use when in Scotland before Edward was granted the Dukedom of Edinburgh. Unlike his brother (the then Prince Andrew, Earl of Inverness) and nephews (Prince William, Earl of Strathearn and Prince Harry, Earl of Dumbarton), Prince Edward did not receive a Scottish title on the occasion of his marriage. (Note: As heir apparent, Prince Charles (now Charles III) received his former Scottish titles of Duke of Rothesay, Earl of Carrick, Baron of Renfrew, Lord of the Isles, and Prince and Great Steward of Scotland upon his mother's accession to the throne.)

The County of Forfar, renamed Angus in 1928, contains Glamis Castle, the seat of the Earls of Strathmore and Kinghorne, from whom Prince Edward's grandmother Queen Elizabeth the Queen Mother was descended.

In July 2019, the Earl and Countess visited Forfar on their first official visit to the town since the Queen granted the title in March 2019. He was presented with 'Earl of Forfar' tartan, to decorate the Earl and Countess, by a town firm – the Strathmore Woollen Company. The weave is based on the existing Forfar tartan, which it designed in 2004 on the colours from the Forfar coat of arms. The geometry remains virtually the same, but the colours have been strengthened, with Azure blue replaced by the St Andrew's blue of the Scottish flag, and white yarns replaced by a brown to reflect the rich agriculture of the surrounds.

The couple visited Forfar again in the summer of 2021.

== Earls of Forfar, first creation (1661) ==
Subsidiary title was Lord Wandell and Hartside (Peerage of Scotland, 1661).

- Archibald Douglas, 1st Earl of Forfar and 2nd Earl of Ormond (1653–1712), younger son of the 1st Earl of Ormond.
- Archibald Douglas, 2nd Earl of Forfar and 3rd Earl of Ormond (1692–1715), only son of the above. On his death without issue in 1715, both earldoms became extinct.

Family tree of the: Earls of Angus, Earls of Avondale, Earls of Douglas, Marquesses of Douglas, Earls of Forfar, Earls of Ormond and Marquesses of Ormond, Earls of Ross and Dukes of Ross

Earl of Angus (Stewart line) and Lord of Bonkyl, 1329
John Stewart d. 1331; 1st Earl of Angus, etc., Lord of Abernethy jure uxoris	William the Hardy; 1243–1298; Lord of Douglas
Thomas Stewart b. before 1331–1361; 2nd Earl of Angus, etc.	Archibald Douglas d. 1333	James Douglas "the Good" c. 1286–1330; Lord of Douglas
Earl of Douglas, 1358
Robert III c. 1337–1406; King of Scotland	Margaret Stewart d. 1417; 3rd Countess of Angus, etc.	William Douglas c. 1323–1384; 1st Earl of Douglas	Archibald Douglas "the Grim" c. 1330 – c. 1400; 3rd Earl of Douglas, Earl of Wigtown, Lord of Galloway, Lord of Douglas, Lord of Bothwell
Earl of Angus transferred from the Stewarts to the Douglasses when Margaret resigned her title in deference to her son, 1389	Earl of Avondale and Lord Balveny, 1437
James I 1394–1437; King of Scotland	Mary Stewart c. 1380–c. 1460	George Douglas; 1380–1430; 1st Earl of Angus, etc.	James Douglas c. 1358–1388; 2nd Earl of Douglas, Earl of Mar	Archibald Douglas "Tyneman" c. 1369–1424; Duke of Touraine, 4th Earl of Douglas, Earl of Wigtown, 13th Lord of Douglas, Lord of Galloway, Lord of Douglas, Lord of Bothwell m. Margaret of Carrick, daughter of Robert III	James Douglas; 1371–1443; 7th Earl of Douglas, 1st Earl of Avondale, etc.
William Douglas; 1398–1437; 2nd Earl of Angus, etc.	Douglases of Drumlanrig	Archibald Douglas c. 1391–1439; Duke of Touraine, 5th Earl of Douglas, Earl of Wigtown, Lord of Galloway, Lord of Douglas, Lord of Bothwell, Lord of Selkirk and Ettrick Forest, Eskdale, Lauderdale, Liddesdale and Annandale, Count of Longueville, Seigneur de Dun-le-roi
Earl of Ormond (Scotland) (1st creation), 1445
James II; 1430–1460; King of Scotland	James Douglas; 1428–1446; 3rd Earl of Angus, etc.	George Douglas c. 1427–1463; 4th Earl of Angus, etc.	William Douglas c. 1424–1440; Duke of Touraine, 6th Earl of Douglas, Earl of Wigtown, Lord of Galloway, Lord of Bothwell, Lord of Selkirk and Ettrick Forest, Eskdale, Lauderdale, and Annandale, Count of Longueville, Seigneur de Dun-le-roi	William Douglas; 1425–1452; 8th Earl of Douglas, 2nd Earl of Avondale, etc.	James Douglas; 1426–1491; 9th Earl of Douglas, 3rd Earl of Avondale, etc.	Hugh Douglas d. 1455; Earl of Ormond
Earldom of Douglas and Earldom of Avondale forfeit, 1491	Eardom of Ormand forfeit, 1455
James III; 1451/1452–1448; King of Scotland	Archibald Douglas c. 1449–1513; 5th Earl of Angus, etc.
Marquess of Ormond (Scotland) (1st creation), 1476; Earl of Ross, 1481; Duke of Ross, 1488
James IV; 1473–1513; King of Scotland	James Stewart; 1476–1504; Duke of Ross, etc.	George Douglas; 1469–1513 styled Master of Angus	William Douglas of Glenbervie; 1473–1513
Dukedom of Ross (1488 creation), Marqessate of Ormond (1st creation) and Earldom of Ross (1481 creation) extinct, 1504
Duke of Ross (2nd creation), 1514
James V 1512–1542; King of Scotland	Alexander Stewart; 1514–1515; Duke of Ross	Archibald Douglas; 1490–1557; 6th Earl of Angus, etc.	George Douglas of Pittendreich d. 1552	Archibald Douglas of Glenbervie; 1513–1570
Dukedom of Ross (2nd creation) extinct, 1515	Earl of Ross (1565 creation)
Mary; 1542–1587; Queen of Scotland	Henry Stuart; 1546–1567; Duke of Albany, 1st Earl of Ross, Lord Darnley, Lord Ardmannoch	David Douglas c. 1515–1558; 7th Earl of Angus, etc.	William Douglas; 1533–1591; 9th Earl of Angus, etc.
James VI and I 1566–1625; 2nd Earl of Ross, later King of Scotland	Archibald Douglas; 1555–1588; 8th Earl of Angus, etc., Earl of Morton	William Douglas; 1553–1611; 10th Earl of Angus, etc.
Earldom of Ross (1565 creation), merged with the crown
Marquess of Ormond (Scotland) (2nd creation), Earl of Ross, and Lord Ardmannoch, 1600	Earldom of Angus (1389 creation) resigned in favor of: Marquess of Douglas, Earl of Angus, Lord Abernethy, Lord Bonkyll and Preston, Lord Abernethy, and Lord Jedburgh Forest, 1633
Elizabeth Stuart; 1596–1662	Charles Stuart; 1600–1649; Marquess of Ormond, etc., Later King Charles I of England and Scotland	William Douglas; 1589–1660; 1st Marquess of Douglas, etc. 11th Earl of Angus, etc. (1389 creation)
Marquessate of Ormand (2nd creation) and Earldom of Ross (1600 creation) merged with the Crown, 1625
Earl of Ormond (Scotland) (2nd creation), 1651
Sophia of Hanover; 1630–1714	Archibald Douglas; 1609–1655; 1st Earl of Ormond
Earl of Forfar (1st creation), 1661
King George I 1660–1727	James Douglas c. 1646–1700; 2nd Marquess of Douglas, etc.	Archibald Douglas; 1653–1712; 2nd Earl of Ormond, 1st Earl of Forfar
Duke of Douglas, Marquess of Angus and Abernethy, Viscount of Jedburgh Forest, Lord Douglas of Bonkill, Prestoun, and Robertoun, 1703
King George II; 1683–1760	Archibald Douglas; 1694–1761; 1st Duke of Douglas, etc., 3rd Marquess of Douglas, etc.	Archibald Douglas; 1692–1715; 3rd Earl of Ormond, 2nd Earl of Forfar
Dukedom of Douglas, marquessate of Angus and Abernethy, and viscountcy of Jedburgh Forest, lordship Douglas of Bonkill, Prestoun, and Robertoun extinct, 1761; Marquessate of Douglas, earldom of Angus, and lordship of Abernethy and Jedburgh Forest passed to James Hamilton, 7th Duke of Hamilton	Earldoms of Ormond and Forfar extinct, 1715
Frederick; 1707–1751; Prince of Wales
King George III; 1683–1760
Edward Augustus; 1767–1820; Duke of Kent and Strathearn
Queen Victoria; 1819–1901
King Edward VII; 1841–1910
Duke of Clarence and Avondale and Earl of Athlone, 1890
Prince Albert Victor; 1864–1892; Duke of Clarence and Avondale, etc.	King George V 1865–1936
Dukedom of Clarence and Avondale and Earldom of Athlone extinct, 1892
King George VI; 1895–1952
Queen Elizabeth II; 1926–2022
Earl of Forfar (2nd creation), 2019
Prince Edward b. 1964; Duke of Edinburgh, Earl of Forfar

== Earls of Forfar, second creation (2019) ==
Earl	Portrait	Birth	Marriage(s)	Death
Prince Edward; House of Windsor; 2019–present also: Duke of Edinburgh (2023), Earl of Wessex (1999), Viscount Severn (1999)	Prince Edward	10 March 1964; Buckingham Palace, London son of Queen Elizabeth II and Prince Philip	19 June 1999; Sophie Rhys-Jones; 2 children	– now 62 years, 256 days old

== Line of succession ==
- Prince Edward, Earl of Forfar (b. 1964)
  - (1) James, Earl of Wessex (b. 2007)
