= Lord Avondale =

Arms of the Stuarts of Avandale

There have been several peerage titles created with the name Avondale (or Avandale), referring to the dale (or valley) of the Avon Water in Scotland. The word strath also means valley, and the area is now better known as Strathaven.

The title Earl of Avondale, along with that of Lord Balveny, was created for James Douglas, known as "the Gross", in 1437. He was a younger son of Archibald Douglas, 3rd Earl of Douglas and succeeded to the Earldom of Douglas in 1440 following the deaths of his nephew and great-nephew. The titles were forfeit in 1455 on the attainder of his son James Douglas, 9th Earl of Douglas and 3rd Earl of Avondale.

The second creation was for Andrew Stuart, who was created Lord Avondale in 1459. He was a son of Sir Walter Stewart and therefore a grandson of Murdoch Stewart, 2nd Duke of Albany. He served as Chancellor of Scotland between 1460 and 1482, and died in 1488, when the title became extinct.

The third creation was for another Andrew Stuart, who was created Lord Avondale in about 1499. He was a great-grandson of Sir Walter Stewart, and thus a great-nephew of the first Lord Avondale. On his death on 9 September 1513, he was succeeded by his son, also named Andrew. The second Lord Avondale exchanged his title for that of Lord Ochiltree on 15 March 1543.

The most recent creation was for Prince Albert Victor, eldest son of the Prince of Wales (later King Edward VII). He was created Duke of Clarence and Avondale and Earl of Athlone on 24 May 1890, but died on 14 January 1892, when the titles became extinct.

== Earls of Avondale (1437) ==
- James Douglas, 1st Earl of Avondale (1371–1443)
- William Douglas, 2nd Earl of Avondale (1425–1452)
- James Douglas, 3rd Earl of Avondale (1426–1488)

== Lord Avondale (1459) ==
- Andrew Stewart, 1st Lord Avandale (d. 1488)

== Lords Avondale (c. 1499) ==
- Andrew Stewart, 1st Lord Avondale (d. 1513) - great nephew of the former 1st Lord Avondale.
- Andrew Stewart, 2nd Lord Avondale (d. 1548)

== Duke of Clarence and Avondale (1890) ==
- Prince Albert Victor, Duke of Clarence and Avondale (1864–1892)

== Family tree ==
Family tree of the: Earls of Angus, Earls of Avondale, Earls of Douglas, Marquesses of Douglas, Earls of Forfar, Earls of Ormond and Marquesses of Ormond, Earls of Ross and Dukes of Ross

Earl of Angus (Stewart line), 1329
John Stewart (d. 1331); 1st Earl of Angus, Lord of Bonkyl, Lord of Abernethy jure uxoris	William the Hardy (1243–1298); Lord of Douglas
Thomas Stewart (b. before 1331-1361); 2nd Earl of Angus	Archibald Douglas (d. 1333)	James Douglas "the Good" (c. 1286–1330); Lord of Douglas
Earl of Douglas, 1358
Robert III of Scotland (c. 1337–1406)	Margaret Stewart (d. 1417); 3rd Countess of Angus, Lady of Abernethy, Lady of Bonkyll	William Douglas (c. 1323–1384); 1st Earl of Douglas	Archibald Douglas "the Grim" (c. 1330 – c. 1400); 3rd Earl of Douglas, Earl of Wigtown, Lord of Galloway, Lord of Douglas, Lord of Bothwell
Earl of Angus transferred from the Stewarts to the Douglasses when Margaret resigned her title in deference to her son, 1389	Earl of Avondale and Lord Balveny, 1437
James I (1394–1437)	Princess Mary of Scotland	George Douglas (1380–1430); 1st Earl of Angus, Lord of Abernethy, Lord of Bonkyll	James Douglas (c. 1358–1388); 2nd Earl of Douglas, Earl of Mar	Archibald Douglas "Tyneman" (c. 1369–1424); Duke of Touraine, 4th Earl of Douglas, Earl of Wigtown, 13th Lord of Douglas, Lord of Galloway, Lord of Douglas, Lord of Bothwell m. Margaret of Carrick, daughter of Robert III	James Douglas (1371–1443); 7th Earl of Douglas, 1st Earl of Avondale, 1st Lord Balveny
William Douglas (1398–1437); 2nd Earl of Angus	Douglases of Drumlanrig	Archibald Douglas (c. 1391–1439); Duke of Touraine, 5th Earl of Douglas, Earl of Wigtown, Lord of Galloway, Lord of Douglas, Lord of Bothwell, Lord of Selkirk and Ettrick Forest, Eskdale, Lauderdale, Liddesdale and Annandale, Count of Longueville, Seigneur de Dun-le-roi
Earl of Ormond (Scotland) (1st creation), 1445
James II (1430–1460)	James Douglas (1428–1446); 3rd Earl of Angus	George Douglas (c. 1427–1463); 4th Earl of Angus	William Douglas (c. 1424–1440); Duke of Touraine, 6th Earl of Douglas, Earl of Wigtown, Lord of Galloway, Lord of Bothwell, Lord of Selkirk and Ettrick Forest, Eskdale, Lauderdale, and Annandale, Count of Longueville, Seigneur de Dun-le-roi	William Douglas (1425–1452); 8th Earl of Douglas, 2nd Earl of Avondale, 2nd Lord Balveny	James Douglas (1426–1491); 9th Earl of Douglas, 3rd Earl of Avondale, 3rd Lord Balveny	Hugh Douglas (d. 1455); Earl of Ormond
Earldom of Douglas and Earldom of Avondale forfeit, 1491	Eardom of Ormand forfeit, 1455
James III (1451/1452–1448)	Archibald Douglas (c. 1449–1513); 5th Earl of Angus
Marquess of Ormond (Scotland) (1st creation), 1476; Earl of Ross, 1481; Duke of Ross, 1488
James IV (1473–1513)	James Stewart (1476–1504); Duke of Ross, Marquess of Ormond, Earl of Ross	George Douglas (1469–1513) styled Master of Angus	William Douglas of Glenbervie (1473–1513)
Dukedom of Ross (1488 creation), Marqessate of Ormond (1st creation) and Earldom of Ross (1481 creation) extinct, 1504
Duke of Ross (2nd creation), 1514
James V (1512–1542)	Alexander Stewart (1514–1515); Duke of Ross	Archibald Douglas (1490–1557); 6th Earl of Angus	George Douglas of Pittendreich (d. 1552)	Archibald Douglas of Glenbervie (1513–1570)
Dukedom of Ross (2nd creation) extinct, 1515
Earl of Ross (1565 creation)
Mary, Queen of Scots (1542–1587)	Henry Stuart (1546–1567); Duke of Albany, 1st Earl of Ross, Lord Darnley, Lord Ardmannoch	David Douglas (c. 1515–1558); 7th Earl of Angus	William Douglas (1533–1591); 9th Earl of Angus
James VI and I (1566–1625); 2nd Earl of Ross	Archibald Douglas (1555–1588); 8th Earl of Angus, Earl of Morton	William Douglas (1553–1611); 10th Earl of Angus
Earldom of Ross (1565 creation), merged with the crown
Marquess of Ormond (Scotland) (2nd creation), Earl of Ross, and Lord Ardmannoch, 1600	Marquess of Douglas (1st creation), 1633
Elizabeth Stuart (1596–1662)	Charles Stuart (1600–1649); Marquess of Ormond, Earl of Ross; Later King Charles I of England and Scotland	William Douglas (1589–1660); 1st Marquess of Douglas, 11th Earl of Angus
Marquessate of Ormand (2nd creation) and Earldom of Ross (1600 creation) merged with the Crown, 1625
Earl of Ormond (Scotland) (2nd creation), 1651
Sophia of Hanover (1630–1714)	Archibald Douglas (1609–1655); 1st Earl of Ormond
Earl of Forfar (1st creation), 1661
King George I (1660–1727)	James Douglas (c. 1646–1700); 2nd Marquess of Douglas, 12th Earl of Angus	Archibald Douglas (1653–1712); 2nd Earl of Ormond, 1st Earl of Forfar
Duke of Douglas, Marquess of Angus and Abernethy, Viscount of Jedburgh Forest, Lord Douglas of Bonkill, Prestoun, and Robertoun, 1703
King George II (1683–1760)	Archibald Douglas (1694–1761); 1st Duke of Douglas, Marquess of Angus and Abernethy, and Viscount of Jedburgh Forest, Lord Douglas of Bonkill, Prestoun, and Robertoun, 3rd Marquess of Douglas, 13th Earl of Angus	Archibald Douglas (1692–1715); 3rd Earl of Ormond, 2nd Earl of Forfar
Dukedom of Douglas, Marquessate of Angus and Abernethy, and Viscountcy of Jedburgh Forest, Lordship Douglas of Bonkill, Prestoun, and Robertoun extinct, 1761; Marquessate of Douglas, and earldom of Angus passed to James Hamilton, 7th Duke of Hamilton	Earldoms of Ormond and Forfar extinct, 1715
Frederick (1707–1751); Prince of Wales
King George III (1683–1760)
Edward Augustus (1767–1820); Duke of Kent and Strathearn
Queen Victoria (1819–1901)
King Edward VII (1841–1910)
Duke of Clarence and Avondale and Earl of Athlone, 1890
Prince Albert Victor (1864–1892); Duke of Clarence and Avondale, Earl of Athlone	King George V (1865–1936)
Dukedom of Clarence and Avondale and Earldom of Athlone extinct, 1892
King George VI (1895–1952)
Queen Elizabeth II (1926–2022)
Earl of Forfar (2nd creation), 2019
Prince Edward (b. 1964); Duke of Edinburgh, Earl of Forfar

== See also ==
- Avondale Castle
- Balvenie Castle
- Earl of Douglas
- Earl Castle Stewart
