= Threave Castle =

Castle in Scotland

- Near Castle Douglas, Dumfries and Galloway, Scotland
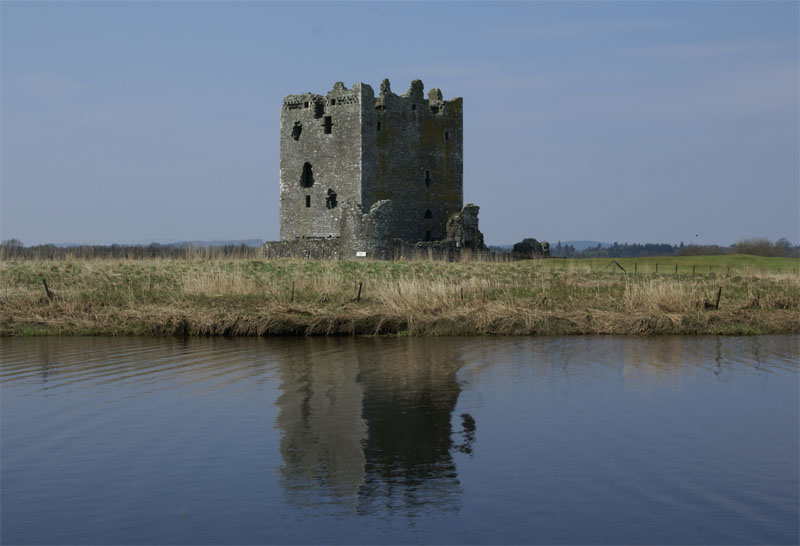
- Threave Castle seen across the River Dee

Site information
- Type: Tower house
- Owner: Historic Environment Scotland
- Open to the public: Yes
- Condition: Ruined

Location
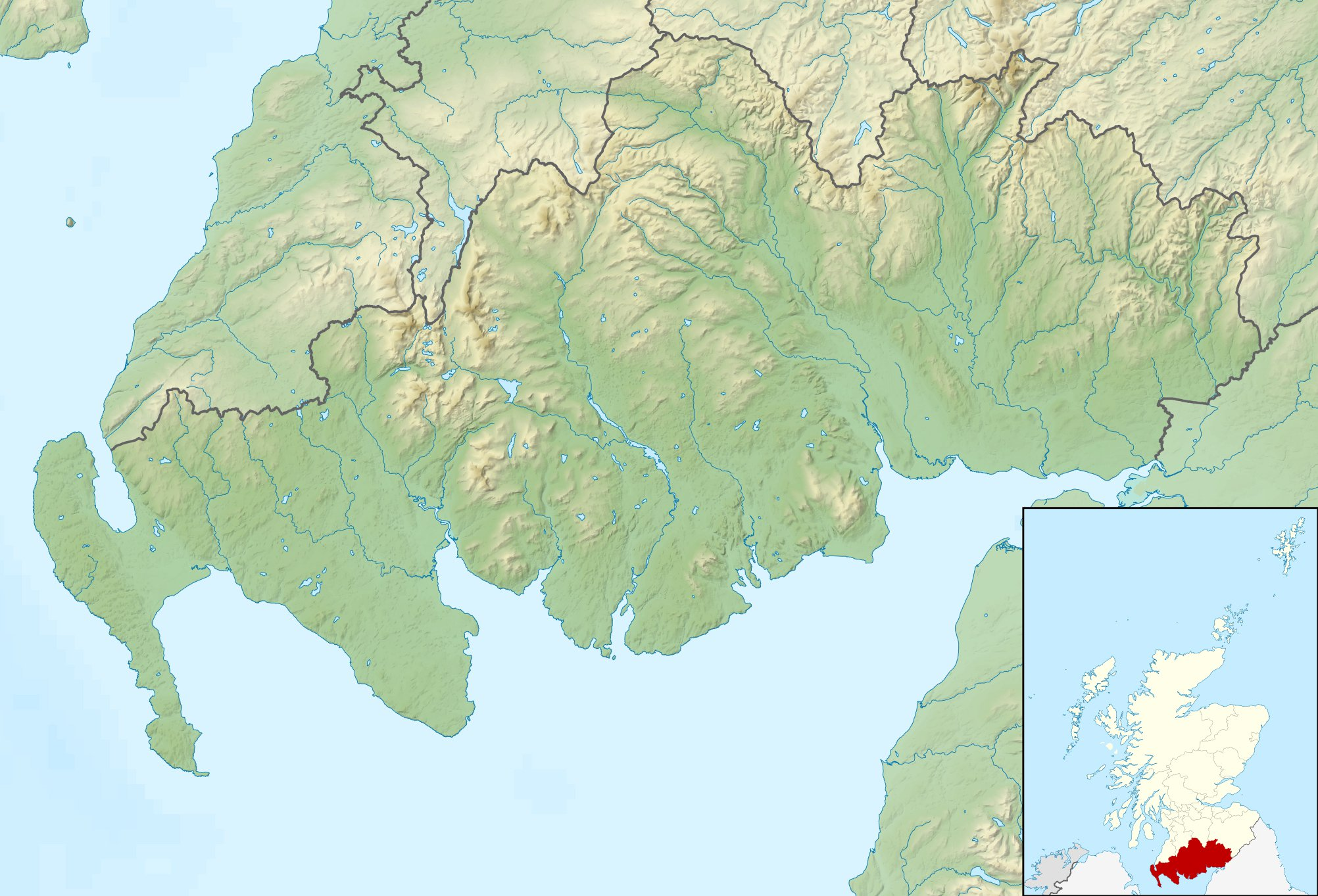
- Shown within Dumfries and Galloway
- Coordinates: 54.9392°N 3.9697°W
- Height: 21 metres (69 ft)

Site history
- Built: c.1370
- Built by: Archibald the Grim, Lord of Galloway; William Douglas, 8th Earl of Douglas
- In use: c.1370–1640
- Battles/wars: Sieges in 1455 and 1640

Threave Castle is situated on an island in the River Dee, 2.5 kilometres (1.6 mi) west of Castle Douglas in the historical county of Kirkcudbrightshire in the Dumfries and Galloway region of Scotland.

Built in the 1370s by Archibald the Grim, it was a stronghold of the "Black Douglases", Earls of Douglas and Lords of Galloway, until their fall in 1455. For part of this time, the castle and the lordship of Galloway were controlled by Princess Margaret, daughter of Robert III and widow of Archibald Douglas, 4th Earl of Douglas. In 1449 Threave was regained by William Douglas, 8th Earl of Douglas, Scotland's most powerful magnate, who controlled extensive lands and numerous castles. He fortified Threave with an "artillery house", a sophisticated defence for its time. The excessive power of the Black Douglas lords led to their overthrow by James II in 1455, after which Threave was besieged and captured by the King's men.

It became a royal castle, and in the 16th century hereditary responsibility for Threave was given to the Lords Maxwell. It was briefly held by the English in the 1540s, but did not see serious action until the Bishops' Wars, when in 1640 a royalist garrison was besieged by a force of Covenanters. Partially dismantled, the castle remained largely unused until given into state care in 1913. The ruins, comprising the substantially complete tower house and the L-shaped artillery house, are today maintained by Historic Environment Scotland as a scheduled monument.

The castle complex is open to the public.

== History ==
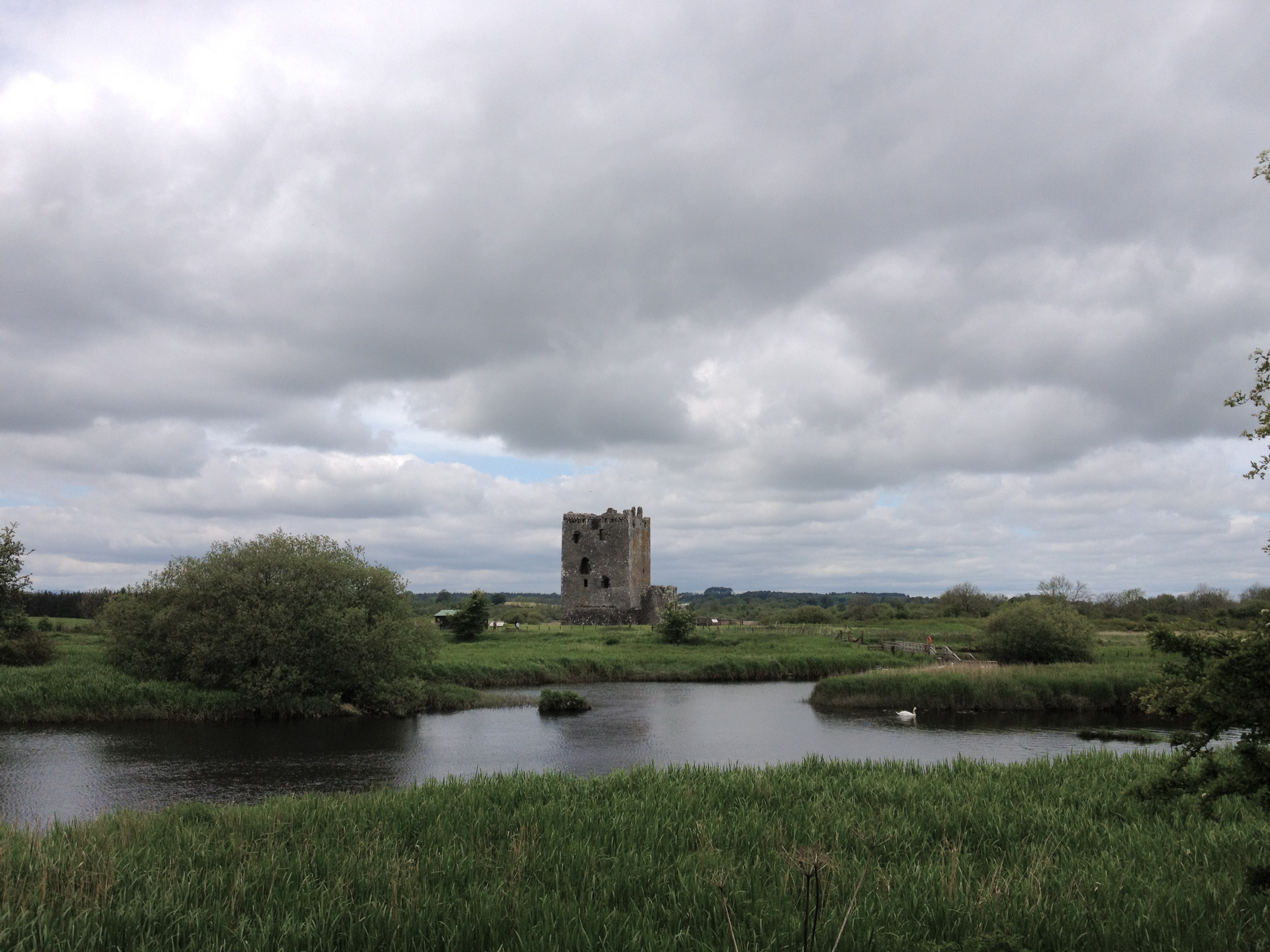
Threave Castle

The name Threave is most likely derived from the Cumbric tref, meaning "homestead", suggesting that the island was settled before Gaelic-speaking people arrived in the area in the 7th century. The site has traditionally been associated with Fergus of Galloway, the 12th-century Lord of Galloway, though there is no evidence to support this. The chronicler John of Fordun records that, in 1308, Edward Bruce defeated a force of Gallwegians on the River Dee, and afterward "burnt up the island". Archaeological finds of a penny dated to 1300, unearthed in the context of burned buildings, may locate this event at Threave. Excavations in the 1970s revealed traces of buildings that could be attributed to this period, and which could have formed part of an early stronghold of the Lords of Galloway.

=== Douglas stronghold ===
The Douglas family had been strong supporters of Robert the Bruce through the Wars of Scottish Independence. In 1308 Edward Bruce and "Good Sir James" Douglas led a campaign in Galloway against the local lords, led by Dugald Macdowall, and their English supporters. Following the Battle of Neville's Cross in 1346 further risings in Galloway, in support of Edward Balliol, were put down by Sir William Douglas. The Douglases were rewarded for these services to the crown: William was made Earl of Douglas in 1358, while his cousin Archibald Douglas, son of Sir James, was created Lord of Galloway in 1369.

Known as "Archibald the Grim", he had been appointed Warden of the West March in 1361, and spent the following years attacking the English on both sides of the border. In 1372 he further gained the lands of the Earl of Wigtown, bringing all of Galloway under his control. In order to secure his new holdings, Archibald required a strong castle, and it is assumed that Threave Castle was built at this time. The main keep dates from this time, and was one of the first tower houses built in Scotland, standing alone without any outer defensive features. A harbour was formed to the west to provide access across the river. The excavations in the 1970s revealed remains of additional stone buildings, constructed in the late 14th century, which may represent a hall and a chapel.

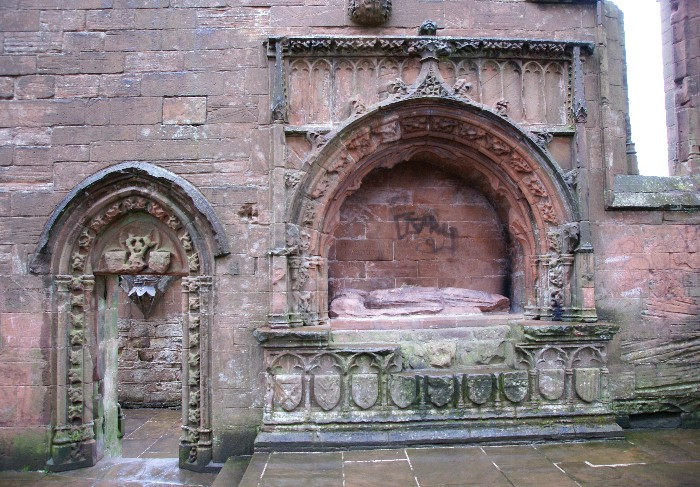
Princess Margaret's tomb at Lincluden Collegiate Church

In 1384 Archibald attacked and took Lochmaben Castle, the last English stronghold in south-west Scotland, and in 1388 he inherited the title of 3rd Earl of Douglas. He thus became the most powerful magnate in the country, controlling lands across southern Scotland and castles including Douglas Castle and Bothwell Castle in Lanarkshire. He funded a rebuilding of Sweetheart Abbey near Dumfries, and contracted marriages for his children with the offspring of King Robert III. Although he probably spent relatively little time at Threave, he died there in 1400, the first historical reference to the castle. He was succeeded by his son Archibald, who in 1390 had married Princess Margaret, daughter of Robert III. In 1424 he led a Scottish force to fight the English in France where he was killed at the Battle of Verneuil. His wife Margaret took on the Lordship of Galloway on Archibald's death, and ruled from Threave as Countess of Douglas and Duchess of Touraine for the next 23 years, outliving her son and grandsons. In 1449 she was forced to cede Galloway to the 8th Earl of Douglas, and died at Threave soon after. Her monument stands in Lincluden Collegiate Church. A lead seal matrix made for Margaret was recovered during archaeological excavations at Threave. The seal shows her coat of arms, combining the arms of her husband with the Royal Arms of her father Robert III. Although a rare survival, the workmanship is poor suggesting it may have been a trial piece or even a forgery.

=== Downfall of the Black Douglases ===
The power and influence of the Douglases continued to grow. Archibald Douglas, 5th Earl of Douglas, succeeded to his father's estates and in 1437 was appointed Regent to the young James II. He died unexpectedly in 1439 and in the ensuing power struggle Sir William Crichton, Sir Alexander Livingston of Callendar, and James Douglas, Earl of Avondale (son of Archibald the Grim) conspired to usurp the Black Douglas power. In 1440 they summoned Archibald's children William and David to Edinburgh Castle. At the so-called "Black Dinner" that followed, the two boys were summarily beheaded on trumped-up charges, over the protests of the ten-year-old King James II. James Douglas was the principal benefactor, inheriting the Earldom of Douglas.

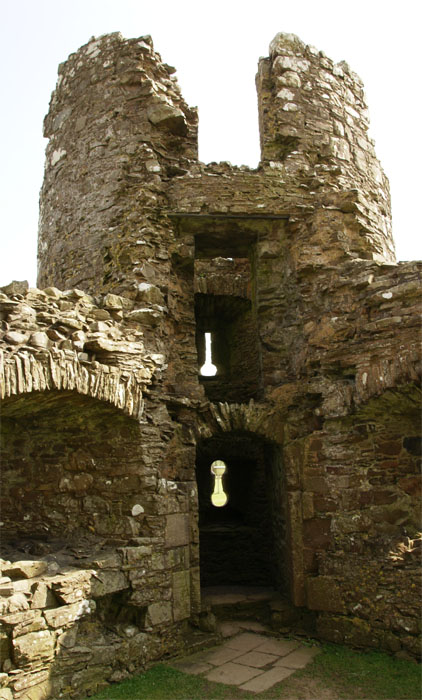
The 8th Earl built the artillery house, provided with gun loops on two levels, as seen from inside

On James' death in 1443, his oldest son William became 8th Earl of Douglas. The following year he married, with Papal dispensation, his first cousin Margaret, the "Fair Maid of Galloway", daughter of the 5th Earl. In doing so he reunited the Black Douglas estates with the Lordship of Galloway, still held by the Fair Maid's grandmother Princess Margaret. The marriage was unpopular with the other nobles who were wary of the power of the Earl, as well as his influence over the young James II who was still a minor. In 1447 Earl William forced the elderly Princess Margaret to give up Threave Castle and retire to Lincluden, finally giving him control of Galloway. He began a series of improvements to the fortifications at Threave, demolishing the earlier outbuildings and constructing elaborate outer defences. These included a defensive wall along the river bank, as well as the "artillery house", a curtain wall with three towers designed to be defended with guns. It is considered to be one of the first purpose-built artillery defences to be built in Britain.

In 1452 the Earl seized Patrick Maclellan of Bombie, Sheriff of Galloway, and imprisoned him at Threave. Despite the King requesting his release, Maclellan was murdered. On 22 February 1452, Douglas was summoned to Stirling Castle, under a safe conduct by the King, who requested his aid against the rebellious Earls of Crawford and Ross. However, Douglas had signed a bond with these earls and refused to support the King, who responded by stabbing Douglas. He was then attacked and killed by the King's retainers, and his body thrown from a window.

=== The siege of Threave ===
William's brother James Douglas, now 9th Earl, hastily continued the additions to Threave, completing the artillery house as well as earthworks to the north of the keep. After his brother's murder, he intrigued with the English court, receiving money from Henry VI's government for the works. The 9th Earl's uprising was defeated at the Battle of Arkinholm near Langholm on 1 May 1455, following which his strongholds were systematically besieged. Threave Castle was the last castle to fall, and the royal forces arrived in June. King James resided at Tongland Abbey during the siege, which lasted over two months. The new artillery house prevented the King's men from taking the castle by force, even when a bombard, a large siege cannon, was brought up from Linlithgow Palace at a cost of over £59. Instead, King James persuaded the garrison to surrender by making payments and grants of land to Douglas supporters.

One myth associated with the siege, which is related by Nigel Tranter, is that the great cannon Mons Meg was built in Kirkcudbright by a smith named Mollance. The cannon was then presented to James II and employed in the siege of Threave. The myth goes that the first cannonball smashed right through the castle, taking off the Fair Maid's hand as she drank. However, it is known that Mons Meg was actually made in Burgundy and arrived in Scotland in 1454.

=== Royal fortress ===
The castle, along with the lordship of Galloway, was annexed by the Crown, and a succession of keepers were appointed. James II returned in 1460, on his way to the siege of Roxburgh Castle, where he would be killed by an exploding cannon. James III gave the castle to his wife Margaret of Denmark, though it is not known if she ever visited. James IV visited in 1502, when royal accounts record cloth, wine and falconers being brought to Threave.

In 1513, Robert Maxwell, 5th Lord Maxwell, was appointed keeper following the death of the previous keeper, John Dunbar of Mochrum, at Flodden. In 1526 the position was made hereditary to the Maxwells (later Earls of Nithsdale). In 1542, Robert Maxwell was captured after the Battle of Solway Moss, and forced to hand Threave over to the English invaders. It was retrieved for Scotland by the Earl of Arran in 1545. The Catholic Maxwell family, based at Caerlaverock Castle, were often suspected of treachery as Scotland turned to Protestantism, and Lord Maxwell was required to surrender Threave temporarily as the Spanish Armada approached the English coast.

During the Bishops' Wars of 1638–1640, the Maxwells supported Charles I. A garrison of up to 100 men was installed at Threave, and further earthworks were added to the Castle's defences. The army of the Covenanters, opposed to the royalist cause, arrived in summer 1640 and laid siege to the castle. After holding out for 13 weeks, the garrison surrendered on the orders of King Charles. The Covenanters ordered the buildings to be dismantled, and the materials to be disposed "to the use of the public".

=== Later history ===
The keep and artillery house largely remained standing, but Threave was never lived in again. Around 1800, during the Napoleonic Wars, modifications were made to allow French prisoners to be held there, although it is not recorded that Threave was actually used for this purpose. In 1913 the ruins were given into state care, and some repairs and archaeological investigations were carried out. The castle has been a scheduled monument since 1921 due to its national significance. More detailed excavations took place in the 1970s, revealing details of the castle's history. Threave Castle is cared for by Historic Environment Scotland and is open to the public. Access to the castle is via a boat over the River Dee, from the Threave Estate, which is owned by the National Trust for Scotland and operated as a nature reserve that is home to bats and ospreys.

== Castle ==
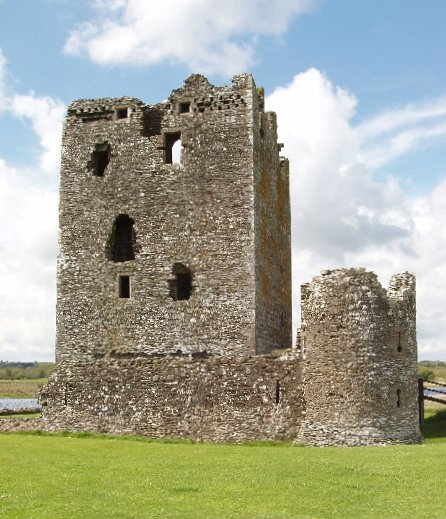
South side of the tower house and artillery house

Threave Castle comprises a 14th-century keep or tower house, and an outer wall that includes the 15th-century artillery house. It is sited on the western edge of the island, which today covers 8 hectares (20 acres), although in the 15th century it is estimated to have been only a third of this size. The island would have supported subsidiary buildings, such as stores and workshops, as well as the castle. Access was by boat or via a ford or underwater causeway at the south end of the island.

=== Keep ===
The rectangular keep is 18.4 by 12.1 m (60 by 40 ft) on plan, and 21 m (69 ft) high. Inside, there were five storeys. The single entrance to the keep, on the east side, was accessed from a wooden stair-tower via a movable bridge. This entrance is at first-floor level, and led into a reception hall. Also on the first floor was the kitchen, and below this, accessed by a ladder, were vaulted storage cellars with a well and a prison. From the reception hall a spiral stair within the 2 m (6 ft 7 in)-thick wall led up to the great hall, and above this the lord's outer chamber and bedchamber. Larger windows are provided on the less vulnerable west and north sides of these rooms.

The top level was used as servants' quarters or, during times of trouble, as accommodation for the garrison. The battlements were accessed from this floor, and nine windows gave views in all directions. An outer door at this level allowed equipment to be hauled up from ground level. On three sides, holes in the external walls would have supported a timber gallery known as a bretèche, which allowed the defenders to drop objects on attackers at the walls, while a more permanent machicolation over the entrance served the same purpose.

=== Curtain wall and other features ===
The keep is enclosed by the later curtain wall, which wraps around the east, south and west sides of the keep. The east and south sides form the "artillery house", begun by the 8th Earl of Douglas in 1447 and representing a sophisticated artillery defence for its time. (Note: This dating is not universally accepted. Other authors suggest that the architectural evidence points to an early 16th-century date for this work, coinciding with instructions issued to the keeper Lord Maxwell to repair the castle.) It faces the higher ground to the east of the river, from where an attack was most likely to come. It has round towers on its three corners, which are provided with three gun ports on two levels, with a crenellated parapet on the third level. The gun ports on the lower level are 'dumb-bell' shaped, while those above are of the 'inverted keyhole' type. It has been conjectured that the guns mounted in these openings would have been a breech-loading device of around 80 millimetres (3.1 in) calibre, attached to a wooden stock. Only one of these towers, the south east, remains, while the others were damaged in the 1640 siege and subsequently collapsed. Between the towers is a curtain wall, 1.5 metres (4 ft 11 in) thick and formerly up to 6 metres (20 ft) high. It is battered to provide greater strength against artillery, and provided with traditional slits for firing longbows or crossbows. In the centre of the east wall is a gatehouse, almost 8 metres (26 ft) high, which was formerly equipped with a drawbridge and two inner doors, with a firing platform above. The curtain wall would have been accessed via ladders or timber stairs. The curtain walls are only 4.4 metres (14 ft) from the keep, but it is unclear if there was any direct access from one to the other. The curtain wall is surrounded by a rock-cut ditch that was formerly flooded to form a moat.

To the west the river runs close to the keep. The remains of a wall survive along the river bank, curving back towards the north west corner of the keep. A gated harbour was constructed here to provide secure alternative access to the castle. To the north, only an earth bank defends the keep, although the marshy approach to this side would have discouraged attackers. Beyond the artillery house and its ditch, the foundations of older buildings can be seen: these were demolished to provide stone and to clear the field of fire for the artillery house. The outermost defence comprises an earthwork that was hastily built by Lord Maxwell's garrison before the 1640 siege.
