= Balvenie Castle =

Ruined castle in the Moray region of Scotland

Coordinates: 57°27′10.55″N 3°07′26.40″W

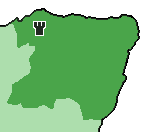
Location

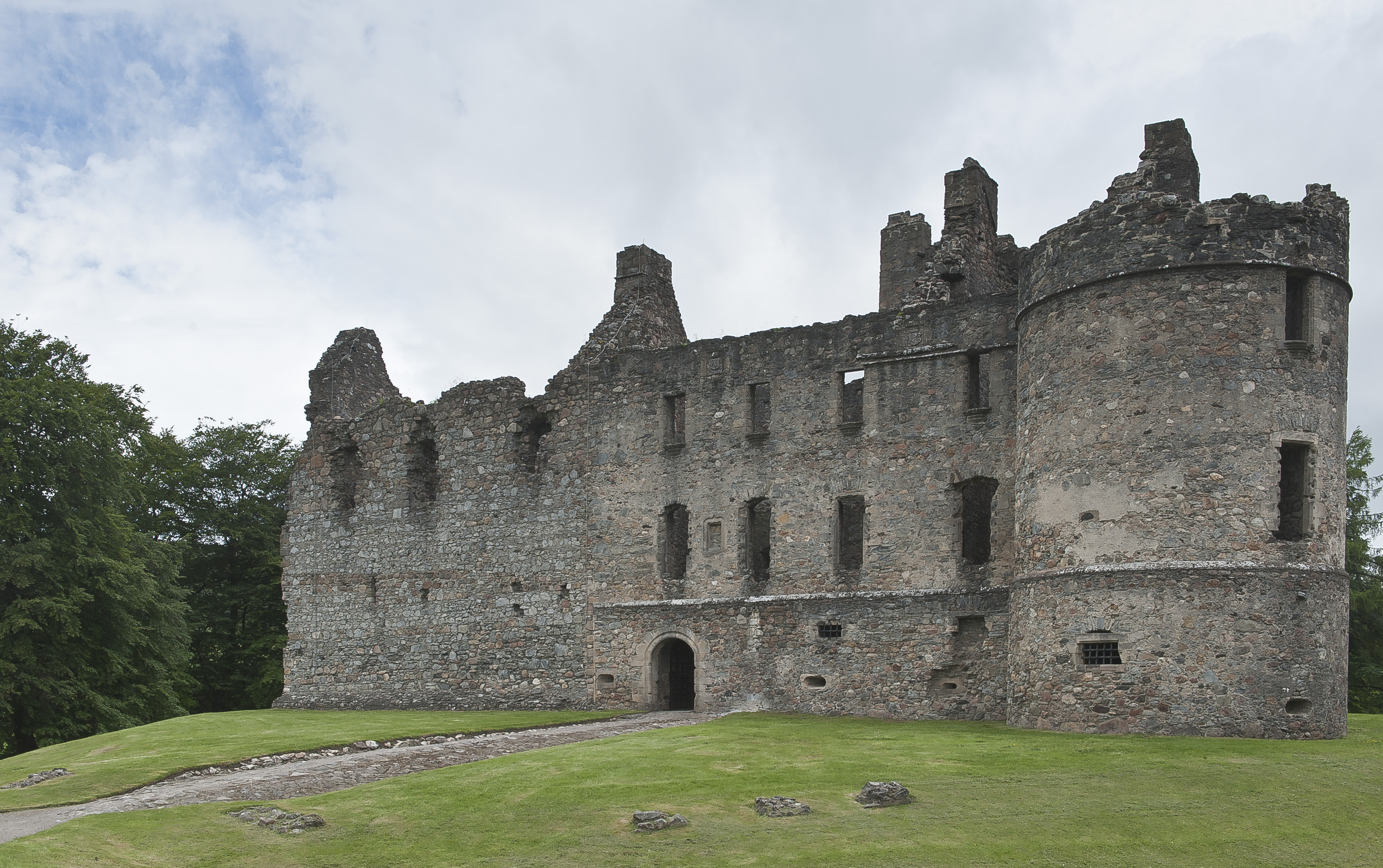
Exterior view

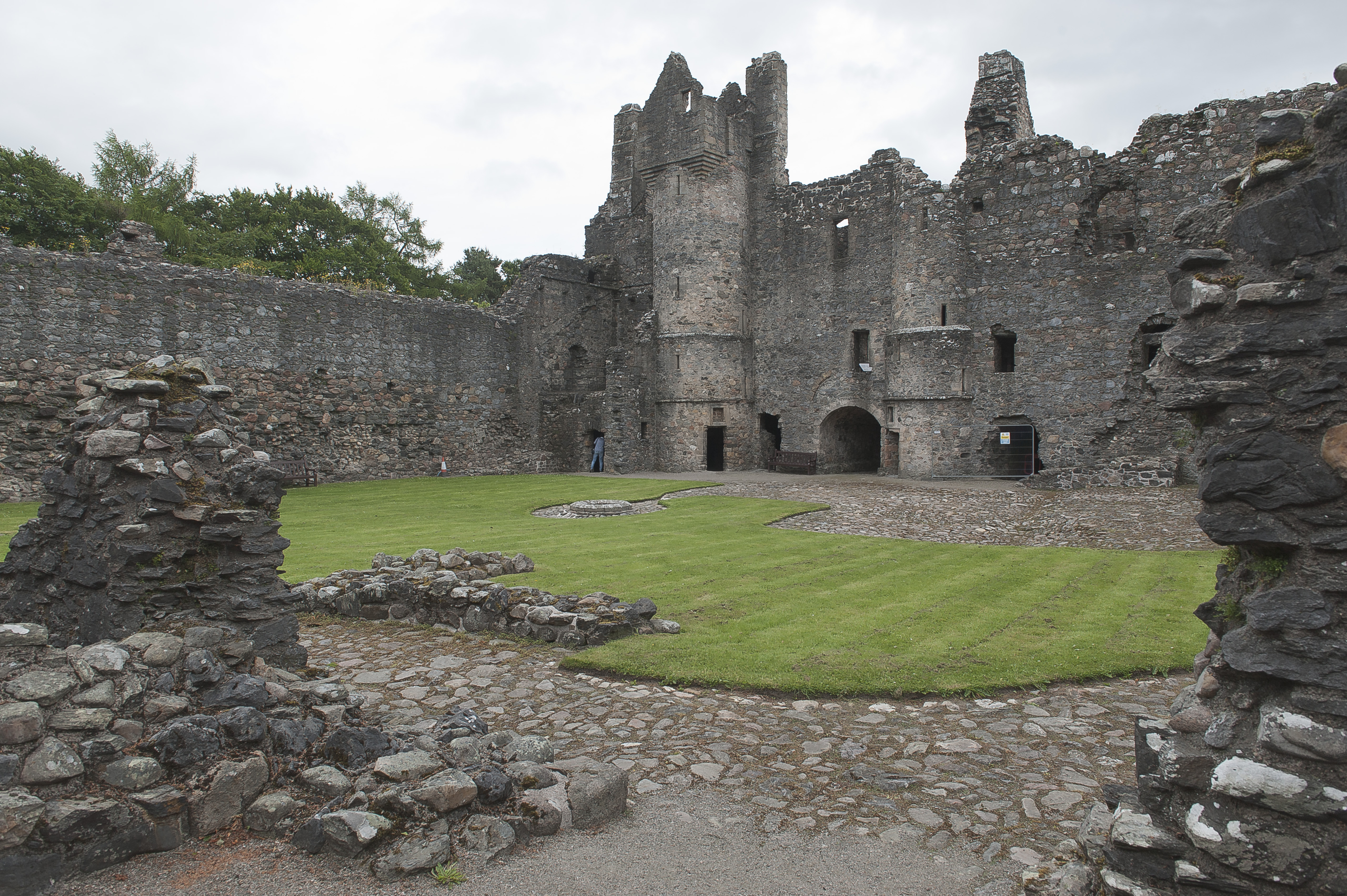
Interior view

Balvenie Castle is a ruined castle 1 km north of Dufftown in the Moray region of Scotland.

== History ==
Originally known as Mortlach, it was acquired by Alexander Comyn, Earl of Buchan in the 13th century after "he surrendered part of his inheritance in order to build up his north-east possessions. Significantly, Alexander Comyn exchanged territory in Tranent (East Lothian) for Mortlach and its important castle of Balvenie, in Highland Banffshire - a charter of 1285 shows this transaction had taken place a generation earlier. Balvenie was a most valuable strategic site, making a bridge between Buchan and the lordship of Badenoch (and Lochaber) the two real seats of power for the Comyns in the thirteenth-century Scotland." Balvenie Castle was extended and altered in the 15th and 16th centuries.

The castle fell out of use following an attack by Robert the Bruce in 1308, which left the property uninhabitable. At some point in the 14th century, the castle and estates of Balvenie passed to the Earl of Douglas. Nothing is documented as to how the Black Douglases first acquired the castle but the most likely account is that it came with the marriage of the heiress Joanna Murray to Archibald 'the Grim' , 3rd Earl of Douglas in 1362. His son and successor Archibald Douglas, 4th Earl of Douglas granted his younger brother James Douglas, 7th Earl of Douglas, latterly known as James 'the Gross' , the lordship of Balvenie in 1408. James's main residence was at Abercorn Castle, a coastal fortress to the west of Edinburgh and Balvenie Castle's use was as temporary accommodation when the need arose.

In 1440, William Douglas, 6th Earl of Douglas, was killed by James the Gross, probably in a conspiracy with William Crichton and Alexander Livingston of Callendar, the guardians of the then child-king James II. James 'the Gross then became the 7th earl. James immediately provided the lordship of Balvenie with its castle to his youngest son, John Douglas, Lord of Balvenie. Earl James's death in 1443 signalled a resumption of the hostility between the royal Stewarts and the Black Douglases. The Battle of Arkinholm in May 1455 saw the defeat of this, the main Douglas line by an army loyal to James II. All of their lands and titles were forfeited to the Crown, including Balvenie Castle. King James divided up the estates among his supporters, which included the Douglas Earl of Angus and provided Balvenie Castle to Sir John Stewart, who later became the first Earl of Atholl.

Mary, Queen of Scots came to Balvenie on 4 September 1562 during her first northern progress. William Duff committed suicide in the castle in 1718 and it was effectively abandoned at that point. It was used by Hanoverian forces as an encampment in 1746 during the second Jacobite rebellion.

Today, the remains of the castle are managed by Historic Environment Scotland as a scheduled monument. However, ownership continues in private hands; the current owner is Jeremy Duncan Nicholson, Baron of Balvenie, who resides in Atlanta, Georgia in the United States. The castle is open to the public from the beginning of April to the end of September.

Balvenie whisky is produced by William Grant & Sons at the Balvenie distillery down the hill from the castle.
