= List of acts of the Parliament of Scotland from 1455 =

This is a list of acts of the Parliament of Scotland for the year 1455.

It lists acts of Parliament of the old Parliament of Scotland, that was merged with the old Parliament of England to form the Parliament of Great Britain, by the Union with England Act 1707 (c. 7).

For other years, see list of acts of the Parliament of Scotland. For the period after 1707, see list of acts of the Parliament of Great Britain.

== 1455 ==
=== August ===
The 11th parliament of James II.

Short title, or popular name	Citation	Royal assent
Long title
Crown Lands Act 1455 Not public and general	August 1455 c. 1 (Note: This is the citation in the Record Edition.); 1455 c. 41 (Note: This is the citation in the Duodecimal Edition.)	4 August 1455
Annexacione of certane lordschippis and castellis to the crowne. Annexation of certain lordships and castles to the crown.
Not public and general	August 1455 c. 2 — (Note: This act is not listed in the Duodecimal Edition.)	4 August 1455
That nane resett James umquhill Erle of Douglas (Note: James Douglas, 9th Earl of Douglas.) and his complicis. That none harbour James, once Earl of Douglas, and his accomplices.
Warden in the Borders Act 1455 (repealed)	August 1455 c. 3; 1455 c. 42	4 August 1455
Of the office and power of the wardanis on the bordouris. Of the office and power of the wardens on the borders. (Repealed by Statute Law Revision (Scotland) Act 1906 (6 Edw. 7. c. 38))
Regalities Act 1455 (repealed)	August 1455 c. 4; 1455 c. 43	4 August 1455
Of the annexacione of Regaliteis now in the kingis handis to the Rialte. Of the annexation of Regalities now in the king's hands to the royalty. (Repealed by Statute Law Revision (Scotland) Act 1906 (6 Edw. 7. c. 38))
Tenure of Offices Act 1455 (repealed)	August 1455 c. 5; 1455 c. 44	4 August 1455
That na office be geffyn in fee and heritage. That no office be given in fee and heritage. (Repealed by Statute Law Revision (Scotland) Act 1906 (6 Edw. 7. c. 38))
Compensation for Offices Revoked Act 1455 (repealed)	August 1455 c. 6; 1455 c. 44	4 August 1455
Of compensacion for officis or custumis revokyt. Of compensation for offices or customs revoked. (Repealed by Statute Law Revision (Scotland) Act 1906 (6 Edw. 7. c. 38))
Coiners Act 1455 (repealed)	August 1455 c. 7 —	4 August 1455
Of the arestouris of fals cunyeouris. Of the arrest of false coiners. (Repealed by Statute Law Revision (Scotland) Act 1906 (6 Edw. 7. c. 38))
Sorners Act 1455 (repealed)	August 1455 c. 8; 1455 c. 45	4 August 1455
Of sornouris. Of sorners. (Repealed by Statute Law Revision (Scotland) Act 1906 (6 Edw. 7. c. 38))
Burghs Act 1455 (repealed)	August 1455 c. 9; 1455 c. 46	4 August 1455
Of the secret consale of burowis. Of the secret council of burghs. (Repealed by Statute Law Revision (Scotland) Act 1906 (6 Edw. 7. c. 38))
Embassy to Pope Act 1455 (repealed)	August 1455 c. 10 —	4 August 1455
Of ane ambaxat to the pape. Of an embassy to the pope. (Repealed by Statute Law Revision (Scotland) Act 1906 (6 Edw. 7. c. 38))
Sumptuary Laws Act 1455 (repealed)	August 1455 cc. 11-12; 1455 c. 47	4 August 1455
Of the arraymentis for Parliamentis and Generale Consallis. Of the arrayment for Parliaments and General Councils. (Repealed by Statute Law Revision (Scotland) Act 1906 (6 Edw. 7. c. 38))
Continuation of Parliament Act 1455 (repealed)	August 1455 c. 13 —	4 August 1455
Continuacion of this parliament. Continuation of this parliament. (Repealed by Statute Law Revision (Scotland) Act 1906 (6 Edw. 7. c. 38))
Not public and general	August 1455 c. 14 —	4 August 1455
Ordinacio de non recipiendo vel supportando Jacobum olim comitem de Douglas Johannem douglas olim dominum de Balvany (Note: John Douglas, Lord of Balvenie.) et Beatricem dictorum Jacobi et Johannis matrem. Order not to receive or support James, formerly Earl of Douglas, John Douglas, formerly lord of Balvany, and Beatrice, mother of the said James and John.

=== October ===
The 12th parliament of James II.

Short title, or popular name	Citation	Royal assent
Long title
War with England Act 1455 (repealed)	October 1455 c. 1 (Note: This is the citation in the Record Edition.); 1455 c. 48 (Note: This is the citation in the Duodecimal Edition.)	19 October 1455
Of takynnis on the est bordour be balys birnyng. Of tokens on the east border be bales burning. (Repealed by Statute Law Revision (Scotland) Act 1906 (6 Edw. 7. c. 38))
Traitors in England Act 1455 (repealed)	October 1455 c. 2; 1455 c. 48	19 October 1455
Of the punicione of thame that warnys of the riding of ane host in Inglande. Of the punishment of those that warn of the riding of any host in England. (Repealed by Statute Law Revision (Scotland) Act 1906 (6 Edw. 7. c. 38))
Treason Act 1455 (repealed)	October 1455 c. 3 c. 49	19 October 1455
Of personis sclanderit or suspect of tresone. Of persons ??? or suspected of treason. (Repealed by Statute Law Revision (Scotland) Act 1906 (6 Edw. 7. c. 38))
War with England (No. 2) Act 1455 (repealed)	October 1455 c. 4 c. 50	19 October 1455
That nane pas in Inglande without leif in tyme of weir. That none shall pass into England without leave in time of war. (Repealed by Statute Law Revision (Scotland) Act 1906 (6 Edw. 7. c. 38))
War with England (No. 3) Act 1455 (repealed)	October 1455 c. 5 c. 51	19 October 1455
That na Inglisman cum in Scotlande withoutyn conduct or assoverance. That no Englishman comes into Scotland without conduct or assurance. (Repealed by Statute Law Revision (Scotland) Act 1906 (6 Edw. 7. c. 38))
War with England (No. 4) Act 1455 (repealed)	October 1455 c. 6 c. 51	19 October 1455
That na Scottisman bring in the realme ony Inglismen. That no Scotsman bring into the realm any Englishmen. (Repealed by Statute Law Revision (Scotland) Act 1906 (6 Edw. 7. c. 38))
War with England (No. 5) Act 1455 (repealed)	October 1455 c. 7 c. 51	19 October 1455
That na Scottisman sit apon speciale assoverance of ony Inglisman. That no Scotsman place special assurance on any Englishmen. (Repealed by Statute Law Revision (Scotland) Act 1906 (6 Edw. 7. c. 38))
War with England (No. 6) Act 1455 (repealed)	October 1455 c. 8 c. 52	19 October 1455
That na Scottisman supple Bervyk nor Roxburghe. That no Scotsman supply Berwick or Roxburgh. (Repealed by Statute Law Revision (Scotland) Act 1906 (6 Edw. 7. c. 38))
War with England (No. 7) Act 1455 (repealed)	October 1455 c. 9 c. 52	19 October 1455
Of the parting of gudis quhen the wardan ridis or ony uthir chiftane. Of the dividing of goods when the warden rides or any other chieftain. (Repealed by Statute Law Revision (Scotland) Act 1906 (6 Edw. 7. c. 38))
War with England (No. 8) Act 1455 (repealed)	October 1455 c. 10 c. 53	19 October 1455
Of reif of gudis or presonaris. Of relief of goods and prisoners. (Repealed by Statute Law Revision (Scotland) Act 1906 (6 Edw. 7. c. 38))
War with England (No. 9) Act 1455 (repealed)	October 1455 c. 11 c. 54	19 October 1455
Of willfull effray in the hoist. Of wilful affray in the host. (Repealed by Statute Law Revision (Scotland) Act 1906 (6 Edw. 7. c. 38))
War with England (No. 10) Act 1455 (repealed)	October 1455 c. 12 c. 54	19 October 1455
Thir saide statutis to be proclamyt at raidis maide in Inglande. The said statute to be proclaimed at raids made in England. (Repealed by Statute Law Revision (Scotland) Act 1906 (6 Edw. 7. c. 38))
Sorners (No. 2) Act 1455 (repealed)	October 1455 c. 13 — (Note: This act is not listed in the Duodecimal Edition.)	19 October 1455
Anent Inquisicion of sornouris and oppressouris. Abouts Inquisitions of sorners and oppressors. (Repealed by Statute Law Revision (Scotland) Act 1906 (6 Edw. 7. c. 38))
Border Garrisons Act 1455 (repealed)	October 1455 c. 14 c. 55	19 October 1455
Of the laying of garnisonis apone the bordouris. Of the laying of garrisons upon the border. (Repealed by Statute Law Revision (Scotland) Act 1906 (6 Edw. 7. c. 38))

=== Sources ===
- Alexander, William (1841). "Acta Parliamentorum Regis Jacobi Secundi". An Abridgement of the Acts of the Parliaments of Scotland. Edinburgh: Adam and Charles Black. p. 441 – via Google Books.
- Alexander, William (1841). "Acta Parliamentorum Regis Jacobi Secundi". An Abridgement of the Acts of the Parliaments of Scotland. Edinburgh: Adam and Charles Black. p. 441 – via Google Books.
- Chronological Table of the Statutes. London: Her Majesty's Stationery Office. 1972. p. 1318 – via Google Books.
- "Index of Statutes: James II (1437-1460)". Records of the Parliaments of Scotland to 1707. University of St Andrews.

== See also ==
- List of legislation in the United Kingdom
- Records of the Parliaments of Scotland
