= William Douglas of Cluny =

Scottish noble

- Born: William Douglas c. 1428
- Died: c. before 1475
- Occupations: Scottish noble, guardian to King James III of Scotland

William Douglas of Cluny (c.1428 - c. 1475) was a Scottish noble who was a guardian to King James III of Scotland and in 1464, Warden of the Eastern and Middle Marches.

== Biography ==
William Douglas was the son of William, 2nd Earl of Angus and Margaret Hay.

Douglas was appointed guardian to King James III during his minority, and received from him before 1462, some of the spoil accruing from the forfeiture of the Earl of Douglas and his adherents. Two years later, in 1464, King James appointed him Warden of the Eastern and Middle Marches, in succession to his brother the 4th Earl of Angus on 12 January 1463, and at the same time committed to him the keeping of the castles of Douglas and Tantallon, with their lordships.

When the 5th earl, "Bell-the-Cat", came of age in 1470, William Douglas came before the King and ad eius genua prouolutus — resigned ward of Tantallon and the lordship of Douglas per fustem et baculum in the said earl's favour. The lands which he received upon the forfeiture of his kinsmen, comprising Sunderlandhall in Selkirkshire, Cranston in Midlothian, and Traquair and Leithenhope in Peeblesshire, were erected on 16 January 1464 into the barony of Sunderland in his favour.

William Douglas of Cluny, sometimes styled lord of Sunderland and sometimes lord of Traquair, died, probably unmarried, before 1475, when his lands of Cluny appear in possession of the 5th Earl of Angus.
