= Battle of Sark =

1448 battle of the Anglo-Scottish Wars

Coordinates: 54°59′10″N 3°4′19″W

- Part of the Anglo-Scottish Wars
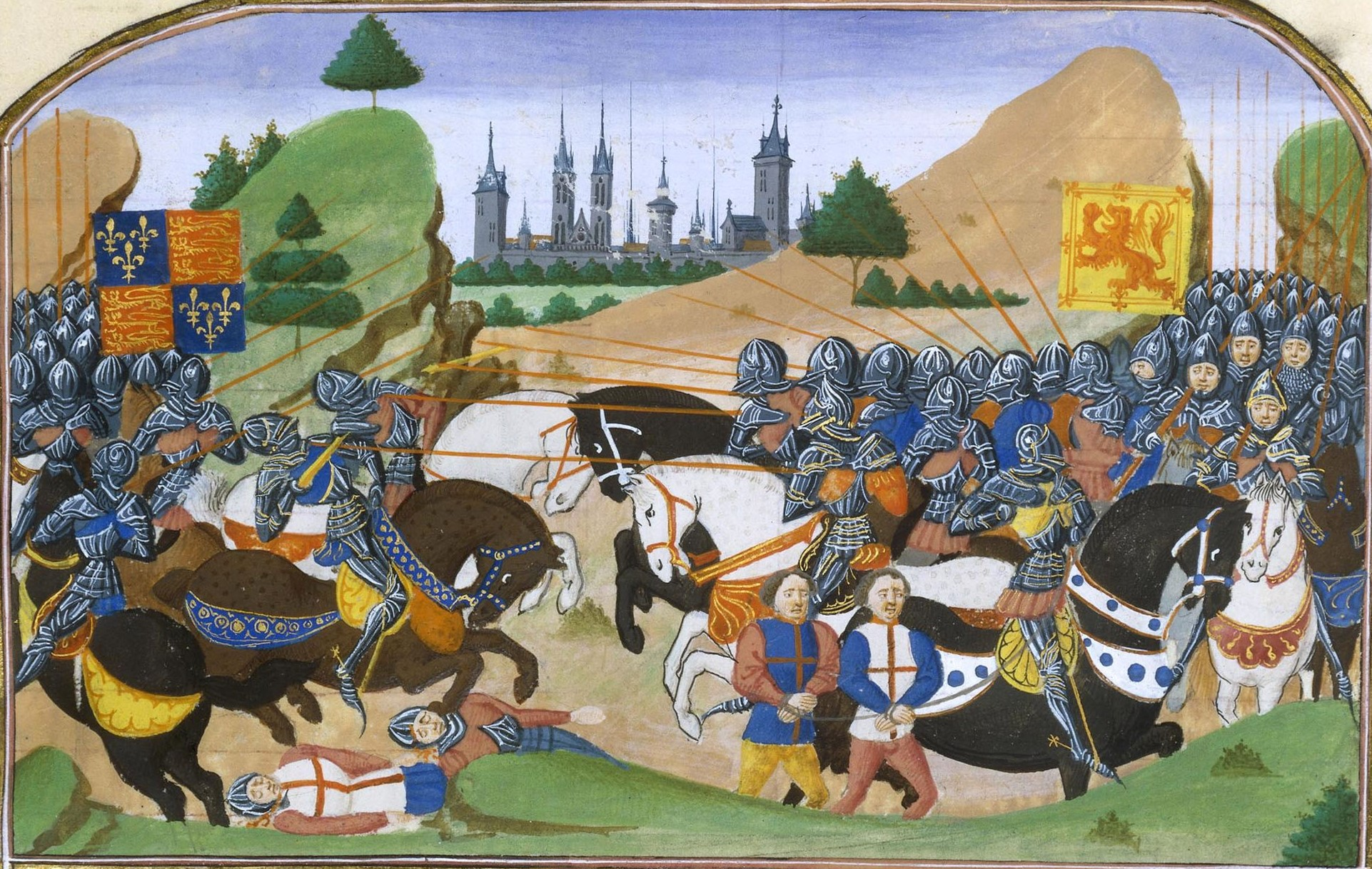
- Battle of Sark, miniature from Bibliotheque Nationale de France, MS Fr. 2691, a copy of a chronicle of Jean Chartier, c. 1470s, probably painted by Philippe de Mazerolles.
Date	23 October 1448 or 1449
Location	Gretna, Dumfries and Galloway grid reference NY314662
Result	Scottish victory

Belligerents
Kingdom of Scotland	Kingdom of England

Commanders and leaders
Hugh Douglas, Earl of Ormonde; Sir John Wallace of Craigie; John Somerville; The Sheriff of Ayr; Lord Herbert Maxwell; Lord Adam Johnstone; David Stewart of Castlemilk	Henry Percy, Earl of Northumberland; Henry Percy; Sir John Pennington; Sir John Harrington; Magnus Redmane †

Strength
4,000, mainly spearmen with some archers.	6,000, including a battle of archers and some cavalry.

Casualties and losses
26-600 killed, Sir John Wallace of Craigie later died of wounds received at the battle.	2,000-3,000 killed and drowned, many captured including Sir John Pennington, Sir John Harrington, and the younger Percy.

Registered battlefield
- Designated: 3 August 2016
- Reference no.: BTL40

The Battle of Sark, or the Battle of Lochmaben Stone, was fought between Scotland and England on 23 October 1448 or 1449. It was a decisive Scottish victory, the first since the Battle of Otterburn in 1388, and the last pitched battle to be fought between the two kingdoms during the Medieval period.

== Date ==
An entry in the Auchinleck Chronicle dated "The ᵹer̃ of god JMiiijCxlviij The xxv day of februar̃..." (The year of God 1448 the 25th day of February) is followed by the entry relating to the Battle of Sark which begins "That ſamȳ ᵹer̃ þe xxiij day of october̃..." (That same year the 23rd day of October) which suggests that the battle occurred on 23 October 1448.

However, at the time the chronicle was written, the 25th of March (the Feast of the Annunciation) was usually considered the beginning of the new year meaning that the entry dated 25 February 1448 would today be considered 25 February 1449, placing the battle which occurred during the following October on 23 October 1449.

== Context ==
Scotland and England agreed to a truce on 18 May 1444 which was to last ten years.

William Douglas, Earl of Douglas, took up residence at Threave Castle in 1447 and held a conference of borderers at Lincluden Abbey on 18 December 1448 to codify the laws of the Marches as ordained by his grandfather Archibald the Grim. Preparations were made for the defence of the West March including the erection of nine beacons in Nithsdale and eleven beacons in Annandale.

Henry Percy and Sir Robert Ogle destroyed Dunbar in May 1449, breaking the truce of 1444. On the 10th of May James II appointed commissioners to negotiate a new truce. The Earl of Douglas, alongside the Earls of Orkney, Angus, and Ormonde, retaliated by destroying Alnwick on the 3rd of June. The Warden of the West March Richard Neville, Earl of Salisbury, destroyed Dumfries later the same month. Scotland and England agreed to a new truce at Winchester on the 10th of July which was to begin on the 10th of August and last until the 20th of September. The Earl of Douglas returned to England with 1,100 men and destroyed Warkworth on the 18th of July and began raiding throughout Northumberland and Cumberland. Although 200 of the Earl's men were captured, less than ten were killed. The truce began on the 10th of August and continued until the 20th of September without incident and was renewed until the 19th of November.

== Battle ==
Warden of the East March Henry Percy, Earl of Northumberland, with the support of King Henry VI, led an army into Scotland in October commanded by his son Henry Percy, Sir John Pennington, Sir John Harrington, and Magnus Redmane which comprised 6,000 men including an entire battle of archers, a contingent of Welshmen, and some cavalry to raid the lands of Douglas, breaking the existing truce. The English camped by the Lochmaben Stone on an area of flat ground between the River Sark and Kirtle Water on the north shore of the River Esk.

Hugh Douglas, Earl of Ormonde, gathered a force to see off the invaders including Sir John Wallace of Craigie, John Somerville, the Sheriff of Ayr, Lord Herbert Maxwell, Lord Adam Johnstone, David Stewart of Castlemilk, and 4,000 men of Annandale, Nithsdale, Carrick, and Kyle which were mainly spearmen with some archers.

The English were warned of the Scottish advance by their raiding parties and readied themselves for battle near their camp. Sir John Harrington and Magnus Redmane commanded the vanguard, the Earl of Northumberland commanded the middle guard, and Sir John Pennington commanded the rearguard with the Welsh. The archers were deployed in loose formation ahead of the main body of infantry in the style of Crécy, Poitiers, and Agincourt.

The Scots deployed into formation to the north of the English position. Sir John Wallace of Craigie commanded the vanguard, the Earl of Ormonde commanded the middle guard, and Lord Herbert Maxwell and Lord Adam Johnstone commanded the rearguard.

The Scots advanced in formation but were halted by arrow fire as soon as they came into range of the English longbows. Sir John Wallace of Craigie led the vanguard in a daring charge which scattered the undefended archers and then engaged the English vanguard with axes, long spears, and halberds, driving them back and capturing their standard. Magnus Redmane charged forward to attack Sir John Wallace of Craigie but was killed in the attempt. The rest of the Scots joined the fray. The Sark, Kirtle, and Esk penned the English in place making manoeuver or retreat impossible and they were driven into a rout. The English attempted to flee over the rivers where many of them drowned or were cut down upon the banks.

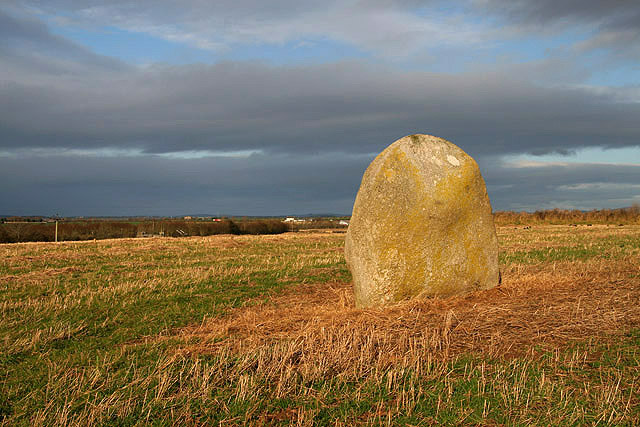
The Lochmaben Stone

== Aftermath ==
The English lost 2,000-3,000 men, around 500 of whom drowned, and many were captured and brought to Lochmaben Castle including Sir John Pennington, Sir John Harrington, and the younger Percy. The Earl of Northumberland himself managed to escape with the help of his son.

Only 26-600 Scots were killed and none were captured. Sir John Wallace of Craigie was gravely wounded at the battle and died three months later. On 28 January 1450 Sir John Wallace of Craigie, on his deathbed, renounced all claims he and his son had made on the lands of the Abbey of Paisley. The Douglas' victory redeemed them from their previous defeat at Homildon Hill in 1402 and granted them justification to increase their lands along the border and the size of their armed retinues.

On the 3rd of November James II appointed commissioners to negotiate a new truce which was concluded at Durham on the 5th of November.
