= John Douglas, Lord of Balvenie =

John Douglas, Lord of Balvenie (also spelled Balveny or Balvany; c. 1433–1463) was the youngest of the five Black Douglas brothers, who rebelled against King James II of Scotland.

Arms of John Douglas, Lord Balvenie after c.1445

== Biography ==
=== Early life ===
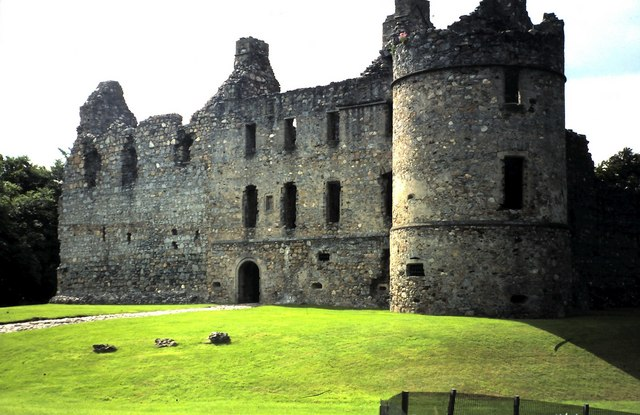
Balvenie Castle, caput of John of Balvenie's territories

Balvenie was the son of James Douglas, 7th Earl of Douglas and his wife, Beatrice Sinclair, daughter to Henry II Sinclair, Earl of Orkney. Of him there is not much on record prior to 1445 when his father resigned the lands of Balvenie, Boharm, and Botriphnie to him. He is also mentioned as an heir of entail to his brother William Douglas, 8th Earl of Douglas in 1451 In 1448, in retaliation for English raids upon the towns of Dumfries, by Richard Neville, 5th Earl of Salisbury, and Dunbar by Henry Percy, 2nd Earl of Northumberland, Balvenie is said to have "ravaged Cumberland and laid the town of Alnwick in ashes." Northumberland, having had his lands plundered gave chase to Balvenie. Balvenie meanwhile had regrouped with his brother, Hugh Douglas, Earl of Ormonde, and on 23 October, met Northumberland at Gretna, the following engagement was a decisive victory for the Douglas brothers known as the Battle of Sark. Northumberland managed to escape, but his son Lord Poynings was captured.

=== Douglas rebellion ===
In 1452 Balvenie's eldest brother, the Earl of Douglas was murdered by King James II with his own hands. Douglas had arrived at Stirling Castle with a Safe conduct issued by the King. According to Boece, Balvenie, along with his brothers, attacked the town of Stirling and paraded the supposed letter of safe conduct tied to the tail of a horse.

In the years between the murder of the eighth earl, and 1455, there followed an intermittent war between the Crown and the Douglases, with King James attempting to dislodge the brothers from their position of power. Balvenie and his brothers were given safe conducts to travel in 1453 which lasted for four years.

On 1 May 1455, at the Battle of Arkinholm, near Langholm, Balvenie and his elder brothers, Archibald Douglas, Earl of Moray, and Ormond were trapped by forces loyal to the crown and were defeated. Moray was killed during the battle, Ormond was captured and executed soon after, but Balvenie escaped to England. For a time he took refuge there, along with the other surviving brother, James Douglas, 9th Earl of Douglas. Following the defeat at Arkinholm, in the summer of 1455, all Douglas titles were declared forfeit, and their land reverted to the crown, Balvenie was specifically cited as having helped his mother fortify the Douglas castle of Abercorn against the King. Balvenie, Douglas and their mother were outcast from Scottish society for their treasonable dealings with the English.

=== Return to Scotland and death ===
Following the death of King James at Roxburgh Castle in 1460, Balvenie returned to Scotland with his brother after being granted an annuity by the English King of £100 from the revenues of the customs of Southampton and other places. In an attempt to foment further rebellion by John of Islay against the Scottish crown, the brothers ratified the Treaty of Ardtornish-Westminster, on behalf of the English with the Lord of the Isles.

For his part in these negotiations, the Scottish council of regency, put a price upon Balvenie's head of 1,200 Merks (the equivalent of £45,000 in the present day). In 1463 Balvenie was again in Scotland trying to raise men to the Douglas standard, but was captured by members of the Scotts of Liddesdale. He was taken to Edinburgh, where he was incarcerated for twelve days before being beheaded.
