= Marquess of Ormond =

Marquess of Ormond may refer to:

- Marquess of Ormonde (Ireland), a title in the Peerage of Ireland
- Marquess of Ormond (Scotland), a title in the Peerage of Scotland
