= Earldom of Ormond =

Earldom of Ormond may refer to:

- Earl of Ormond (Scotland), created twice in the Peerage of Scotland for the House of Douglas
- Earl of Ormond (Ireland), created twice in the Peerage of Ireland for the Butler Family
