= Glendevon Castle =

Castle in Perth and Kinross, Scotland, UK

Coordinates: 56.2309°N 3.65246°W

Glendevon Castle is a collection of conjoined structures dating from the 15th century. The property is now (2022) semi-derelict. It lies on a private road in a wooded area north of the A823 between Glendevon Village and Gleneagles. It is not visible from the main road.

The oldest section is a Z-plan structure dating from the early 15th century. It stands on high ground, and before the planting of the surrounding trees, it held a wide view over the surrounding valley. From around 1650 it had diagonally opposed square towers to both south-west and north-east, but only the south-west tower is intact at its four-storey height, with the remainder being reduced. A smaller circular tower (dating from around 1700) stands on its west side.

In 1452, at the time of his murder, the castle belonged to William Douglas, 8th Earl of Douglas. In the 16th century the castle was acquired by the Crauford family. The Rutherfords acquired the building in the 18th century by which time it had been extended on its north side by low scale vernacular buildings and was primarily in farm use. Further farm structures were built to the east in the 20th century.

The building was listed category B in 1987. The Historic Scotland description surmises that the structure was greatly reduced in size in 1766, as a date-stone bears this date.

From 1966 to around 1987 the building held a "wayside hostelry" known as the Dungeon Bar in its vaulted basement. The bar was partly linked to a caravan park on the low-lying ground to its west.

The property is said to be haunted by at least three ghosts.
