= Hugh Douglas, Earl of Ormonde =

Scottish soldier and nobleman (died 1455)

Arms of Hugh, Earl of Ormonde prior to 1445

Hugh Douglas, Earl of Ormonde (died 1455) was a Scottish soldier and nobleman, a member of the powerful Black Douglases.

He was the fourth son of James the Gross, 7th Earl of Douglas and his wife Beatrice, daughter of Henry II Sinclair, Earl of Orkney. He was a younger brother of William Douglas, 8th Earl of Douglas, James Douglas, 9th Earl of Douglas, Archibald Douglas, Earl of Moray and elder to John Douglas, Lord of Balvenie.

== Life ==
He was created Earl of Ormonde before 1445 when he attended a meeting of the Parliament of Scotland, under that title. He received from his brother the 8th Earl, the lands of Rattray, Aberdour, and Crimond in Aberdeenshire, that of Dunsyre, Lanarkshire, and those of Ardmanach (modern Redcastle, between Tore and Muir of Ord) and Ormonde (modern-day Avoch), in Invernesshire.

He led the Scots to victory at the Battle of Sark, against a scion of the old Douglas enemy, Henry Percy, 2nd Earl of Northumberland. Ormonde was left in control of the vast Douglas estates when his brother went on pilgrimage to Rome in 1450. Following the assassination of his eldest brother by the hand of the king, James II, Ormonde—along with his brothers—renounced their allegiance to the king and went into open rebellion.

The brothers, excepting the new 9th Earl, faced the royal forces at the Battle of Arkinholm. The royal army, led by a kinsman, George Douglas, 4th Earl of Angus, defeated the Black Douglas brethren. Moray died of his wounds, Balvenie escaped; Ormonde, however, was captured, tried and executed, his estates forfeit.

== Issue ==
Ormonde had, by an unknown wife, one child:

- Hugh Douglas, became Dean of Brechin Cathedral
