= George Douglas, 4th Earl of Angus =

Scottish nobleman

George Douglas, 4th Earl of Angus, Lord Douglas, Abernethy and Jedburgh Forest (c. 1427 – 12 March 1463) was a Scottish nobleman. He was the son of William Douglas, 2nd Earl of Angus and Margaret Hay of Yester. Known as the Great Earl of Angus. He succeeded to the Earldom following the death of his childless brother James Douglas, 3rd Earl of Angus in 1446. He was to become the first Red Chief of Douglas.

== Red Douglas and the Stewart connection ==
The chief line of the family were the Earls of Douglas which represented the "Black" line, whereas Angus represented the "Red" Line. Both branches were descended through bastardy from William the Hardy, Lord of Douglas. The Earl of Douglas descended through Archibald the Grim, an illegitimate son of Sir James Douglas. The 4th Earl of Angus' grandfather was an illegitimate child of William, 1st Earl of Douglas.

Although the representatives of both lines of the House wore the "three stars argent" and "Man's Heart gules" on their arms the 4th Earl of Angus and the 8th Earl of Douglas were third cousins. Angus had closer ties with the House of Stewart than his Douglas cousins however, being the great-grandson of Robert III of Scotland through his grandmother Princess Mary of Scotland, Countess of Angus. This was to have major implications in the downfall of the Black Douglases and the rise of the Red line.

== Douglases united ==
In June 1448, Angus joined with his kinsmen the Earl of Douglas and his brother Hugh Douglas, Earl of Ormonde on a punitive raid into England and despoiled the countryside as far as Alnwick which they burnt and "come hame wele". This was in response to attacks led by the Earl of Northumberland and Robert Ogle in which they had burnt Dunbar Castle in the east, and by the Earl of Salisbury who had laid waste to Dumfries in the west. The score was evened in July when the Douglases invested Warkworth Castle and "did gret scaith" and the victory over Northumberland at the Battle of Sark.

This action in 1448 would be the last time that the two branches of the House of Douglas would act in partnership, and ride together against their hereditary foes of Percy and Neville. In 1449 Angus was made Warden of the Middle Marches.

== The Douglas Rebellion ==
In 1452 the 8th Earl of Douglas was murdered at Stirling Castle, by his monarch James II while under assurances of safe-conduct. Other notable magnates assisted King James in the act. The whole of Douglasdale rose in rebellion under the late Earl's younger brothers, James the new 9th Earl of Douglas, his twin Archibald Douglas, Earl of Moray, and the younger Hugh Douglas, Earl of Ormonde, and John Douglas, Lord of Balvenie. During this time of intermittent internecine strife in Scotland, it might have been expected that Angus would have thrown his lot in with his Douglas cousins. However, relationships between the Black Douglases and the Red Douglases had always been tense. Moreover, as alluded above the ties of kinship between Angus and King James were close, being first cousins within one degree. A magnate as powerful as Angus could not abstain from declaring himself either way. So, when the rebellion began in earnest in early 1455, and the King took to the field against the Douglas brothers, Angus came out in full support of his Monarch, and was given high command within the Royal army. It has been suggested that Angus accompanied the King at the siege of Abercorn. Following the defection of James Hamilton, 1st Lord Hamilton, Douglas' chief lieutenant to the King's side, the Earl of Douglas fled to England in an attempt to gain support from Henry VI of England. Douglas' brothers stayed in Scotland to continue the struggle. The brothers had appeared in force in Annandale and King James sent Angus to deal with them. Angus mustered the Border Clans and encountered the rebels on 18 May near Langholm. The ensuing Battle of Arkinholm was a rout for the Douglas brothers, Moray was killed and Ormonde captured (to be executed soon after) and only Balvenie escaped to England. That summer the Black Douglases were attainted and their estates declared forfeit. Angus appended his seal to the charter in token of approval.

== Ascendancy of the Red Douglas ==
Following the acts of attainder, Angus received the vast fiefdom and superiority of the Lordship of Douglas, obtaining a charter of confirmation in 1457

In 1460, Angus accompanied King James to the siege of Roxburgh Castle, held by the English. The castle, which had been a thorn in the side of successive Scottish monarchs, contained a garrison loyal to the House of York. James had decided to back the House of Lancaster. On 3 August James' queen, Mary of Gueldres, had arrived to inspire enthusiasm amongst the besiegers. Overseeing the cannonade to greet his wife, James stood too close to one of the bombards. When it exploded, it killed him, and wounded Angus, his constant companion. Though wounded, Angus was still able to take command of much of the siege, and the castle was stormed and taken within the week. On 10 August, Angus attended the coronation of James III at Kelso Abbey, where he placed the Crown upon the nine-year-old King's head, as was his right as Lord Abernethy. He is supposed to have proclaimed: "There! Now that I have set it upon your Grace's head, let me see who will be so bold as to move it."

Angus had already become enormously powerful during the reign of James II and during the Regency for his son; his power continued to grow. Following the forfeiture of the Black Douglases, the Scots parliament had decreed that no Douglas should have a hereditary right to the wardenship of the Marches, Angus continued to exercise command over the East and Middle Marches, and was appointed lieutenant of the Realm by the Queen-regent Mary of Gueldres.

In the following year, Angus spent a great deal of time consolidating his estates, placing trusted vassals in charge of the more far-flung properties. In 1462, he received all of the goods, lands and rents of the adherents of the forfeited Douglases in Roxburghshire, apart from those already owned by his brother William Douglas of Cluny.

In the same year, Angus was involved in negotiations with the Lancastrian Henry VI of England. Henry had obtained a bond from Angus to aid him with "a stipulated force for the recovery of that realm [England] from Henry's rebels and enemies". For Henry's part, he had promised Angus, on the recovery of his kingdom, "to make the saide erle sufficiently and suerly after the lawes of England a duke withynne the said reavme of England, with stile, astate, honure and name of a duke". The dukedom brought with it a castle and land to the value of 2000 marks.

Angus was unable to pursue his plans for an English dukedom: He died on 12 March 1463 at Abernethy.

== Offices held ==
- Angus was a commissioner sent to treat with the English twice, in 1449 and in 1459.
- Ambassador to England in 1451
- Warden of the East and Middle Marches 1455–1462

== Marriage and issue ==
George Douglas, 4th Earl of Angus married prior to his accession, Isabella Sibbald daughter of Sir John Sibbald of Balgonie, Master of the Household to James II. They had nine children:

- Archibald Douglas, 5th Earl of Angus
- John Douglas
- Anne Douglas, married William Graham, 3rd Lord Graham
- Isabella Douglas, married Sir Alexander Ramsay
- Elizabeth Douglas, married Sir Robert Graham of Fintry
- Margaret Douglas, married sir Duncan Campbell of Glenorchy
- Janet Douglas, married 1st David Scott younger of Buccleuch, 2nd George Leslie, 2nd Earl of Rothes
- Egidia Douglas
- Alice Douglas

Peerage of Scotland
Preceded by James Douglas	Earl of Angus; 1446–1463	Succeeded by Archibald Douglas
