= Margaret Douglas, Fair Maid of Galloway =

Scottish noble (d. c. 1474)

Margaret Douglas
- Born: c. 1427
- Died: c. 1474
- Noble family: Black Douglas
- Spouses: William Douglas, 8th Earl of Douglas; James Douglas, 9th Earl of Douglas; John Stewart, 1st Earl of Atholl
- Father: Archibald Douglas, 5th Earl of Douglas
- Mother: Eupheme Graham

Margaret Douglas, Countess of Douglas (c. 1427 – c. 1474), known as the Fair Maid of Galloway, was a Scottish noblewoman, and a member of the Black Douglas family toward the end of the family's position as a major power in Scotland.

Born c. 1427, she was the daughter of Archibald Douglas, 5th Earl of Douglas, and Eupheme Graham, daughter of Patrick Graham, Earl of Strathearn and Euphemia Stewart, Countess of Strathearn.

She acquired Galloway when her two brothers (one of whom was William Douglas, 6th Earl of Douglas) were murdered at the Black Dinner at Edinburgh Castle in 1440.

== Marriages ==
Margaret married her cousin William Douglas, 8th Earl of Douglas. He was assassinated by King James II and his entourage. Margaret obtained a papal dispensation to marry his brother and successor, James Douglas, 9th Earl of Douglas, with the marriage intended to retain the Douglas estates.

In 1455, her second husband rebelled against King James II, was exiled and attainted. Margaret separated from him and petitioned the King to end her marriage. She had no children by the Earls of Douglas.

She then married John Stewart, 1st Earl of Atholl, who was half-brother to the King as the son of Joan Beaufort and her second husband James Stewart, the Black Knight of Lorne. They had three daughters:

- Janet (Jean), wife of Alexander Gordon, 3rd Earl of Huntly.
- Elizabeth, wife of Andrew Gray, 2nd Lord Gray.
- Christian, married Neil Stewart of Garth

== In fiction ==
She is a significant character in Black Douglas by Nigel Tranter, which is rather speculative about her relationship with the 8th and 9th Earls of Douglas.

She is the protagonist and fictional author of Maid Margaret, a 1905 novel by Samuel Rutherford Crockett and also appears as an important character in his earlier novel The Black Douglas (1899).
