= Abercorn Castle =

Castle in West Lothian, Scotland

- Location within West Lothian
- 55.997716°N 3.472059°W
- Location: West Lothian, Scotland

History
- Built: 12th century
- Demolished: 1455

Scheduled monument
- Official name: Abercorn Castle, remains of
- Type: Secular: castle
- Designated: 27 November 1998
- Reference no.: SM7869

Abercorn Castle was a 12th-century castle near Abercorn in West Lothian, Scotland.

== History ==
The castle was in the possession of William de Avenel in the mid-12th century, before passing to the Clan Graham by marriage and was then passed to the Clan Douglas by marriage.

It was held by the Douglas family from 1400, and James Douglas, 7th Earl of Douglas died in the castle in 1443.

On 18 April 1455, the castle was captured and destroyed by King James II of Scotland, after a siege against James Douglas, 9th Earl of Douglas who had lost the support of James Hamilton, 1st Lord Hamilton. Many of the senior members of garrison were hanged and the lands passed to Clan Seton.

Parts of the castle are thought to have been re-used in the 15th or 16th century.

== Current status ==
The site is now found within the grounds of Hopetoun House. It was excavated in 1963.

The site became a Scheduled Monument on 27 November 1998.

== See also ==
- Hopetoun House
- Midhope Castle
