= Archibald Douglas, Earl of Moray =

Scottish nobleman

Archibald Douglas, Earl of Moray (1426 – 1 May 1455) was a Scottish nobleman during the reign of King James II of Scotland. He was one of the five brothers from the Black Douglas family who clashed with the king.

== Life ==
Arms of Archibald Douglas, Earl of Moray

Douglas was the son of James Douglas of Balveny (later 7th Earl of Douglas) and Lady Beatrice Sinclair, daughter to Henry II Sinclair, Earl of Orkney

He was a twin brother of James Douglas, 9th Earl of Douglas. In later years, James was believed to be the older by only a few minutes, as he inherited the earldom of Douglas, when their older brother was killed by the king, but it has been suggested that in earlier years Archibald was believed to be the older.

He became Earl of Moray jure uxoris, by marrying Elizabeth Dunbar, 8th Countess of Moray, and appears as such at the Parliament of Scotland of 1445, as a witness on the letters patent creating James Hamilton, 1st Lord Hamilton, a Lord of Parliament

He was killed fighting the king's supporters at the Battle of Arkinholm, and his head taken to the King at Abercorn Castle.
