= Battle of Arkinholm =

15th-century Scottish clan battle

Coordinates: 55°9′N 3°0′W

- Part of Stewart – Black Douglas civil war
Date	1 May 1455
Location	Langholm, Dumfries and Galloway grid reference NY3684
Result	Decisive Royalist Victory

Belligerents
Scottish Crown	Black Douglases

Commanders and leaders
Earl of Angus; Laird of Johnstone	Earl of Moray †; Earl of Ormonde (executed); Lord Balvenie

The Battle of Arkinholm was fought on 1 May 1455, at Arkinholm near Langholm in Scotland, during the reign of King James II of Scotland. Although a small action, involving only a few hundred troops, it was the decisive battle in a civil war between the king and the Black Douglases, the most powerful aristocratic family in the country. As the king's supporters won it was a significant step in the struggle to establish a relatively strong centralised monarchy in Scotland during the Late Middle Ages.

== Background ==
The Black Douglases had already suffered some losses before the battle. The king's supporters had taken their castle at Abercorn, and some allies such as the Hamiltons had defected. The head of the family, James Douglas, 9th Earl of Douglas, had gone to England to rally support, but his three younger brothers were at the battle.

== Battle ==
There is some uncertainty about the leadership of the royal army. By some accounts it was led by George Douglas, 4th Earl of Angus, head of the Red Douglas family, a senior aristocrat, and third cousin to the Earl of Douglas. However other accounts describe it as a force of local Border families, Johnstones, Carruthers, Maxwells, and Scotts, who had previously been dominated by the Black Douglases but now rebelled against them, led by the Laird John Johnstone of Johnstone in Annandale, who succeeded his father in 1455.

Of the three Douglas brothers: Archibald Douglas, Earl of Moray was killed in the battle and his head presented to the king, Hugh Douglas, Earl of Ormonde was captured and executed shortly afterwards, and John Douglas, Lord of Balvenie escaped to England.

== Aftermath ==
Shortly after the battle the Black Douglases were attainted, the last few castles held by them fell, and they ceased to be a serious force in Scotland.

After the battle the Douglas, the Earl of Angus (Red Douglas) was awarded the earldom of Douglas, previously held by the Black Douglases along with the original possessions of his ancestors in Douglasdale. Thomas Carruthers, the 2nd son of John Carruthers the 3rd Laird of Holmains, received a charter for the lands of Corry on 23 July 1484, for his services at the Battle of Arkinholm. The lands of Corry were forfeited from George Corry for implication of him in the Albany-Douglas invasion.

A song about the battle has been recorded by The Corries, with words by George Weir and music by Roy Williamson.
