= Archibald Douglas of Glenbervie =

Scottish nobleman (1513–1570)

Arms of the House Douglas of Glenbervie

Sir Archibald Douglas of Glenbervie (1513 – 18 September 1570) was a Scottish nobleman.

== Biography ==
Douglas was the only son of Sir William Douglas of Glenbervie and Elizabeth Auchinleck. Douglas was born at Glenbervie at some point before his father's death at the Battle of Flodden.

== Family ==
He married first, Agnes Keith, daughter of William Keith, 3rd Earl Marischal of Scotland, who died between 1542 and 1548. He married secondly, Elizabeth Irvine, daughter of Sir Alexander Irvine of Drum. He married as his third wife Margaret Carmichael. She was a sister of Elizabeth Carmichael (1514–1550) who was a mistress of James V and later married John Somerville of Cambusnethan.

With his first wife they had William Douglas, 9th Earl of Angus, and with his second wife he had further two sons and six daughters.

His daughter with Elizabeth Irvine, Katherine or Sara Douglas, married Sir John Carmichael.
