= Archibald Douglas, 5th Earl of Angus =

Scottish nobleman (c. 1449–1513)

Archibald Douglas
- 5th Earl of Angus
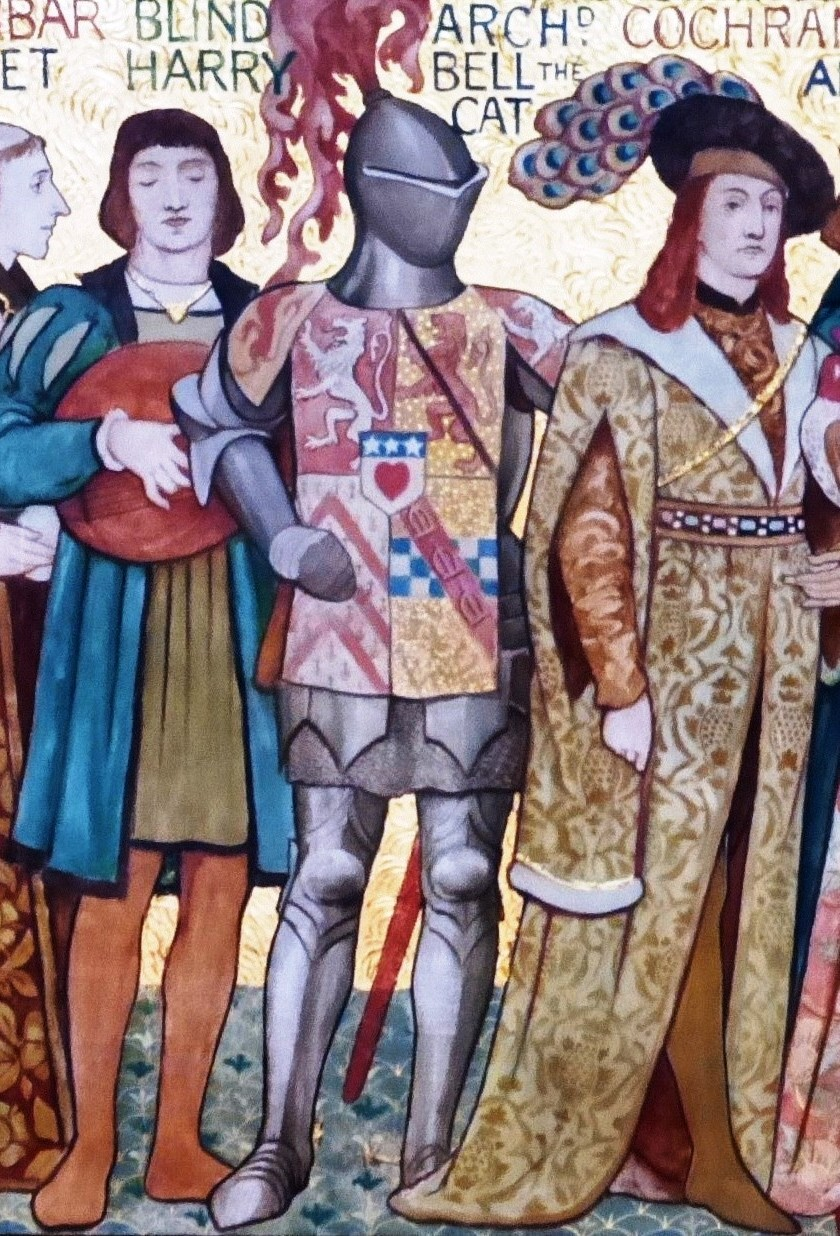
- Archibald 'Bell-the-Cat' depicted as a notable figure in Scottish history by the Victorian artist William Hole
- Predecessor: George Douglas, 4th Earl of Angus
- Successor: Archibald Douglas, 6th Earl of Angus
- Born: c. 1449
- Died: October 1513 (aged 63–64); Whithorn, Kingdom of Scotland
- Buried: Whithorn Priory
- Noble family: Douglas
- Spouses: Elizabeth Boyd (m. 1468; died 1498) Katherine Stirling (m. 1500)
- Issue Detail: George Douglas, Master of Angus; Lady Mariot Douglas; William Douglas of Glenbervie; Gavin Douglas
- Father: George Douglas, 4th Earl of Angus
- Mother: Isabella Sibbald

Arms of Archibald Douglas up until 1491

Archibald Douglas, 5th Earl of Angus (c. 1449 – October 1513) was a Scottish nobleman, peer, politician, and magnate. Tradition has accorded him the nickname 'Bell-the-Cat' due to his association with the 1482 rebellion against James III of Scotland. He became one of the most powerful noblemen in Scotland through his influential position on the Scottish Marches, and a willingness to be involved in multiple rebellions in the reigns of James III and James IV of Scotland.

== Parents and succession ==
Archibald Douglas, eldest son of George Douglas, 4th Earl of Angus, head of the Red Douglas line, was likely born around 1449. His mother was Isabella Sibbald, daughter of the Master of the Household of James II of Scotland.

During the turbulent 1450s, when Archibald was growing up, his father came out in support of James II, thereby pitching himself against many of his own clan, the Black Douglas line in particular, who were in rebellion against the king. He was also at the siege of Roxburgh in 1460. After the accidental death of the king during the siege, it was Archibald's father, George Douglas, 4th Earl of Angus, who is said to have placed the crown on the new child king's head. It is a traditional anecdote that he declared as he did: "There! Now that I have set it upon your Grace's head, let me see who will be so bold as to move it."

Archibald succeeded his father as fifth Earl of Angus about two years later, in 1462 or 1463, while still a minor.

== Actions against James III ==
In 1481, James III appointed Angus Warden of the East March. The following year, during an English invasion, Angus joined the nobles who seized the king at Lauder. According to later chroniclers, like David Hume of Godscroft, Angus is credited with moving against the royal servant and favourite, Thomas (or Robert) Cochrane, and linked the episode to his nickname, "Bell-the-Cat." The more dramatic details, including the hanging of the king's favourites from Lauder Bridge, are not securely attested by contemporary evidence.

The nickname refers to the fable "The Mice in Council" in which someone must undertake the dangerous task of belling the cat for the benefit of all.

Angus subsequently joined the party of the king's disaffected younger brother, Alexander Stewart, Duke of Albany, who was part of the English invasion. Under the Treaty of Fotheringhay in June 1482, Albany promised to recognize Edward IV as overload, perform homage, abandon the French alliance, and surrender specified border territories if English assistance placed him on the Scottish throne.

During James III's captivity Albany briefly became lieutenant-general of the kingdom, having styled himself "Alexander IV" in his dealings with Edward IV. By March 1483, Albany and Angus had submitted to James and received pardons.

Angus rebelled again in 1488, joining the forces supporting the king's son, James, Duke of Rothesay. James III was defeated at the Battle of Sauchieburn and killed while fleeing the field.

== Reign of James IV ==
After Sauchieburn, Angus briefly served as a guardian of the young king James IV but soon lost influence to the Homes and Hepburns. Alexander Home replaced him as Warden of the East March. In 1491 Angus secretly negotiated with Henry VII, promising to follow English counsel in his dealings with the Scottish king, and surrender Hermitage Castle, which commanded the pass through Liddesdale into Scotland, in exchange for English estates.

James IV forced him to submit, surrendering Hermitage Castle and his Liddesdale lands for the lordship of Bothwell.

Restored to royal favour in 1493, Angus served as Chancellor until 1498. He participated in negotiations concerning Perkin Warbeck's surrender in June 1497 but fell from favour again and was confined to Dumbarton Castle in 1501.

== Final weeks ==
Angus accompanied James IV's army into England but opposed engaging the English at Flodden. After the king rejected his advice, Angus withdrew before the battle, leaving his sons George and William with the Douglas contingent; both were killed on 9 September 1513. Angus subsequently joined the council of Queen Regent, Margaret Tudor. Modern summaries indicate he died at Whithorn late in 1513, while some give the date of early 1514. His successor to the Earldom of Angus was his grandson, Archibald Douglas, 6th Earl of Angus.

== Marriages and children ==
Angus married at least twice:

1. Elizabeth Boyd in 1468, daughter of Robert Boyd, 1st Lord Boyd
2. Katherine Stirling in 1500
3. Between these marriages he was associated with Janet Kennedy; authorities differ over whether they contracted a valid marriage, an annulled union, or a non-marital relationship.

=== Children by first marriage ===
Name	Birth	Death	Notes
George Douglas, Master of Angus	1469	9 September 1513	married in March 1488, Lady Elizabeth Drummond; had issue, killed at the Battle of Flodden
Lady Mariot Douglas	1470		married Cuthbert Cunningham, 3rd Earl of Glencairn; had issue
Sir William Douglas	1471	9 September 1513	married Lady Elizabeth Auchinleck; had issue, killed at the Battle of Flodden
Gavin Douglas, Bishop of Dunkeld	c. 1472	September 1522	
Lady Elizabeth Douglas	1474		
Sir Archibald Douglas of Kilspindie	c. 1475	before July 1536	Given the nickname Greysteil by James V
Lady Janet Douglas	1476		

== Angus in fiction ==
The earl is an important character in Chain of Destiny by Nigel Tranter, set during the reign of James IV of Scotland. He is depicted negatively as an adversary of the king and a friend of the English during his reign.

== Notes ==
Peerage of Scotland
Preceded by George Douglas	Earl of Angus; 1462–1514	Succeeded by Archibald Douglas
Political offices
Preceded by 1st Earl of Argyll	Lord Chancellor of Scotland; 1493–1497	Succeeded by 2nd Earl of Huntly
Military offices
Preceded by 1st Earl of Arran	Lord High Admiral of Scotland	Succeeded by 5th Lord Maxwell
