= James Douglas, 7th Earl of Douglas =

Scottish nobleman (1371–1443)

James Douglas
- Earl of Douglas
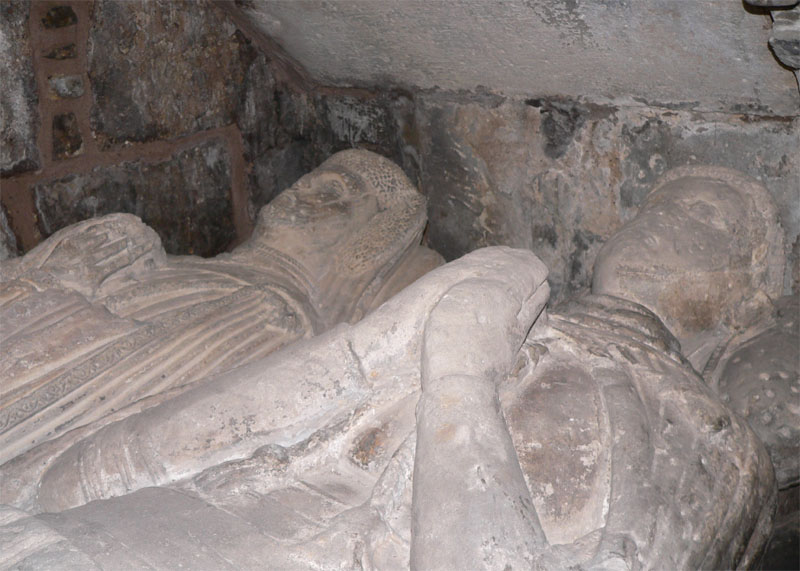
- Tomb of James the Gross and his wife Beatrice Sinclair
- Predecessor: William Douglas, 6th Earl of Douglas
- Successor: William Douglas, 8th Earl of Douglas
- Born: 1371; Scotland
- Died: 24 March 1443 (aged 71–72); Abercorn Castle
- Buried: St Bride's Kirk, Douglas, South Lanarkshire
- Noble family: Douglas
- Spouses: Beatrice Stewart; Beatrice Sinclair
- Issue: Beatrice Hay, Countess of Erroll; William Douglas, 8th Earl of Douglas; James Douglas, 9th Earl of Douglas; Archibald Douglas, Earl of Moray; Hugh Douglas, Earl of Ormonde; John Douglas, Lord of Balvenie; Janet Fleming, Lady Fleming; Margaret Douglas
- Father: Archibald the Grim
- Mother: Joanna de Moravia

James Douglas, 7th Earl of Douglas, 1st Earl of Avondale (1371 – 24 March 1443), latterly known as James the Gross, and prior to his ennoblement as James of Balvenie, was a late mediaeval Scottish magnate. He was the second son of Archibald Douglas, 3rd Earl of Douglas, and Joan Moray of Bothwell and Drumsargard (now Cambuslang), d. after 1408.

== Regent of Douglas ==
His rise to dominance in the kingdom began with the disastrous defeat of his elder brother Archibald Douglas, 4th Earl of Douglas, at the Battle of Homildon Hill in September 1402, where he was captured by the English. James was now acting head of the main branch of the powerful Douglas family and was left to maintain their influence in southern Scotland. His successes in this regard preserved Douglas influence until the return of his elder brother from captivity in 1409, at which time he assumed the role of councillor and was rewarded with the grant of extensive estates. The most important of these was the stronghold of Abercorn Castle, which would become his principal residence for the rest of his life.

== Relationship with the Stewarts ==
In the early 1420s James acted as the link between his brother, the earl, and the powerful Murdoch Stewart, Duke of Albany. Murdoch was acting as regent for his cousin, James I of Scotland, while James was being held by the English for ransom. Douglas' links with the Albany Stewarts however, did not prevent him from becoming a councillor to the king once he returned from imprisonment in 1424. Along with his nephew, Archibald Douglas, 5th Earl of Douglas, he sat on the jury which convicted Murdoch and two of his sons of treason for failure to pay the ransom and allowing the king to be imprisoned for 18 years. In 1426 as a reward for his loyalty Douglas received royal confirmation of his lands and his eldest son William was knighted in 1430. By 1435 he was made sheriff of Lanarkshire, further strengthening his place among the king's principal followers. This backing from the Earl of Douglas' senior kinsman was vital to the king for preventing a clash with the powerful Douglas affinity. Shortly before James' death in 1437 James I gave him the title of Earl of Avondale. (According to Michael Brown in his book James I at page 199, Balvenie did not become the Earl of Avondale until November 1437, nine months after the king's murder, and the earldom was the gift of his nephew, Archibald, 5th Earl of Douglas, by then the lieutenant governor of Scotland.)

== Earl of Douglas ==
When King James was assassinated in 1437, Douglas backed his nephew who became Lieutenant General of Scotland and Regent for the young James II. When his nephew, the 5th Earl, died of fever in 1439, it set off a deadly chain of events that saw power being uneasily shared between Sir William Crichton, Sir Alexander Livingston of Callendar and Douglas himself.

These events culminated in what would become known as the 'Black Dinner' at Edinburgh Castle, where his great-nephew William Douglas, 6th Earl of Douglas, 16 at the time, and his younger brother David were summarily beheaded on trumped up charges in the presence of a protesting young James II. Historians tend to place the blame for the Black Dinner on Crichton and Livingston, but especially Douglas, as the death of his great-nephews brought him the earldom of Douglas and the position as the most powerful magnate in Scotland.

== Marriage and issue ==
He married first Beatrice Stewart, daughter of Robert Stewart, 1st Duke of Albany and Margaret Graham, Countess of Menteith. He married second Beatrice Sinclair, daughter of Henry Sinclair, 2nd Earl of Orkney, around 1425, and their children include:

- Beatrice Douglas, married William Hay, 1st Earl of Erroll, Lord High Constable of Scotland.
- William Douglas, 8th Earl of Douglas (1425–1452), who succeeded his father
- James Douglas, 9th Earl of Douglas (1426–1491), who succeeded his older brother
- Archibald Douglas, Earl of Moray (1426–1455), James's twin
- Hugh Douglas, Earl of Ormonde (d. 1455)
- John Douglas, Lord of Balvenie
- Janet Douglas, had a child with Constantine Dunlop, married Robert Fleming, 1st Lord Fleming
- Margaret Douglas, married Henry Douglas of Borg (d. 1473)

Peerage of Scotland
Preceded by William Douglas	Earl of Douglas; 1440–1443	Succeeded by William Douglas
New creation	Earl of Avondale; 1437–1443	Succeeded by William Douglas
