= James Douglas, 9th Earl of Douglas =

15th-century Scottish nobleman (1426–1491)

James Douglas
- Earl of Douglas
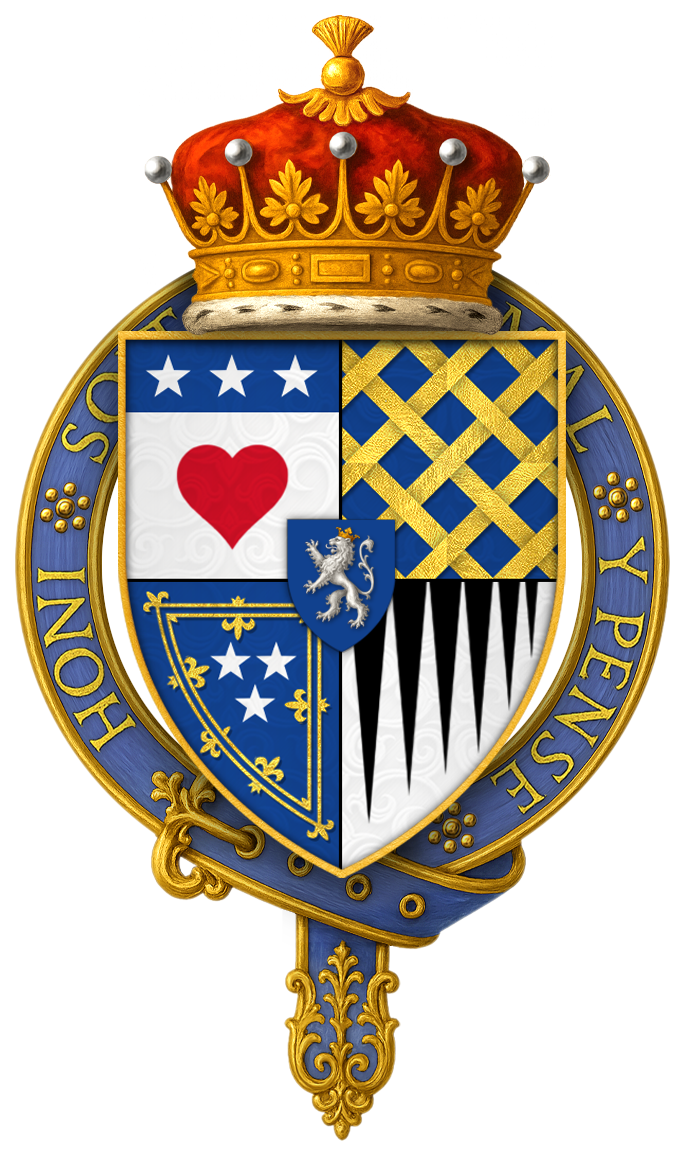
- Quartered arms of Sir James Douglas, 9th Earl of Douglas, KG
- Predecessor: William Douglas, 8th Earl of Douglas
- Successor: forfeit
- Born: 1426; Scotland
- Died: 1491 (aged 64–65); Lindores Abbey
- Buried: Lindores Abbey
- Noble family: Douglas
- Spouses: Margaret Douglas, Fair Maid of Galloway; Anne Holland
- Father: James Douglas, 7th Earl of Douglas
- Mother: Beatrice Sinclair

James Douglas, 9th Earl of Douglas, 3rd Earl of Avondale KG (1426–1491) was a Scottish nobleman, last of the 'Black' earls of Douglas.

== Early life ==
The son of James the Gross, 7th Earl of Douglas, by his wife Lady Beatrice Sinclair, daughter to Henry II Sinclair, Earl of Orkney; Douglas was a twin, the older by a few minutes, the younger being Archibald Douglas, Earl of Moray. James was known as "fiery face" due to a birthmark and his temper.

He succeeded to the earldom on the murder of his brother William Douglas, 8th Earl of Douglas by King James II and his entourage on 22 February 1452. William had been issued with a letter of safe conduct and joined the King for feasting before Lent. On the second evening, he was stabbed 26 times and his body was thrown out of the window. James denounced his brother's murderers, took up arms against the king, and withdrew his allegiance by disavowing his oath. He and his brothers attacked Stirling a month later, driving a horse through the town with the safe conduct letter given to William attached to its tail. The King responded by leading a series of raids into Douglas territories in July. The months of conflict that followed was tantamount to civil war.

James and the King were compelled to and make an uneasy peace on 28 August 1452. Some allies of Douglas deserted him and others in the political community were alienated by the King's raids. As part of the reconciliation, the King agreed to promote a marriage between Douglas and his brother's widow, Margaret Douglas, Fair Maid of Galloway. James obtained a papal dispensation to marry her, with the aim to keep the family estates together. It is not entirely clear that this marriage ever took place, but it was certainly planned. Douglas became involved in intrigues with the English court, and in 1455 rebelled against James II once more.

== Rebellion and exile in England ==
Meanwhile, another branch of the Douglas family, known as the Red Douglases, had risen into importance, and George Douglas, 4th Earl of Angus, great-grandson of the first earl of Douglas, took sides with the king against the Earl of Douglas. Douglas, again deserted by his chief allies, fled to England, and his three younger brothers, Hugh Douglas, Earl of Ormonde, Archibald Douglas, Earl of Moray, and John Douglas, Lord of Balvenie, were defeated on 1 May 1455 at the Battle of Arkinholm, near Langholm on the Esk, possibly by Angus. Moray was killed, Ormonde taken prisoner and executed, and Balvenie escaped to England. Their last stronghold, Threave Castle in Galloway, fell. James Douglas was attainted in 1455, and his lands and estates were forfeit to the crown. The lands of the Douglases were divided among their rivals, the lordship of Douglas falling to the Red Douglas, 4th Earl of Angus. He later tried to reclaim Berwick and Roxborough, but was unsuccessful.

From England, the Earl of Douglas continued to intrigue against James III of Scotland. In 1457, he accompanied an English raid into the west marches of Scotland and a seaborne attack on Kirkcudbright. He supported the Yorkist cause in the War of the Roses, whilst King James supported the Lancastrians. James was employed by King Edward IV in 1461 to negotiate a league at Ardtornish with the western highlanders in order to take the nine-year old's kingdom for England. At some point he was made a Knight of the Garter.

Following his attainder his first wife divorced him (if they ever married) so he married again to Anne Holland, the widowed daughter of John Holland, 2nd Duke of Exeter.

== Capture and death ==
In 1484 he was taken prisoner at the battle of Lochmaben Fair, and was relegated to Lindores Abbey, where he died in or after 1491.

Peerage of Scotland
| Preceded by William Douglas | Earl of Douglas; 1452–1455 | Forfeit |
| Preceded by William Douglas | Earl of Avondale; 1452–1455 | Forfeit |
