= William Douglas, 8th Earl of Douglas =

Scottish nobleman

William Douglas, 8th Earl of Douglas, 2nd Earl of Avondale
- Earl of Douglas, Earl of Avondale
- Tenure: 1443-1452
- Predecessor: James Douglas, 7th Earl of Douglas
- Successor: James Douglas, 9th Earl of Douglas
- Born: 1425
- Died: 22 February 1452 (aged 26–27)
- Cause of death: Stabbed by James II of Scotland
- Spouse: Margaret Douglas
- Father: James Douglas, 7th Earl of Douglas
- Mother: Beatrice Sinclair

William Douglas, 8th Earl of Douglas, 2nd Earl of Avondale (1425 – 22 February 1452) was a late Medieval Scottish nobleman, Lord of Galloway, and Lord of the Regality of Lauderdale, and the most powerful magnate in Southern Scotland. He was killed by James II of Scotland.

== Life ==
Douglas was the eldest son of James Douglas, 7th Earl of Douglas, and Beatrice Sinclair, the daughter of Henry Sinclair, Earl of Orkney.

His father, having been a part of the conspiracy that led to the "Black Dinner" and execution of the 6th Earl and his brother, on his death only three years later left the title and lands to his eldest son William, who may have taken part in the conspiracy. William gained the lordships of Galloway and Bothwell by marriage (by papal dispensation) to his cousin, Margaret Douglas, Fair Maid of Galloway (daughter of the 5th Earl), thus becoming even more powerful and a danger to the throne.

The Earl and his party were issued with a safe conduct for three years, "to pass through England, to the Marches of Calais and elsewhere in the King of England's dominions" dated 9 November 1450. Douglas was planning to attend the Jubilee in Rome and would travel via England, Flanders and France. A further safe conduct, this time expressly stating that the Earl could take a party of 100 and naming many of them, was issued (presumably while they were still travelling) on 23 April 1451. The Earl had returned to Scotland by 14 August 1451 as he was the leading Scottish Conservator of the 3-year truce with England, concluded at Newcastle upon Tyne.

At this time he owned Glendevon Castle in what is now south Perthshire.

During Douglas's absence in Rome, James II had attacked the lands of the Douglases because of Douglas offences against neighbouring lords. After Douglas's return, although there was an outward truce, relations continued to be strained between the king's party and that of the earl. In early February [1452] Sir William Lauder of Haltoun, a close friend and relative (his mother Helen was a daughter of Archibald, 3rd Earl of Douglas, "The Grim") of Douglas, brought a summons to the Earl to attend the King at Stirling. There was abundant precedent for suspicion in a mandate of this nature, but, as if to allay it, Lauder brought safe conduct for Douglas given under the King's hand in council.

Once there, King James demanded the dissolution of a league into which Douglas had entered with Alexander Lindsay, the "Tiger" Earl of Crawford, and John of Islay. Upon Douglas's refusal, the king stabbed him as did the several men with the king, and Sir Patrick Gray, according to the Auchinleck Chronicle, "struck out his brains with a pole ax", and his body was thrown out of a window.

Since Douglas died without issue, his titles passed to his brother James.

== Douglas in fiction ==
Douglas is the central character in Black Douglas, a novel by Nigel Tranter, which is speculative about a few issues e.g. claiming that he had a dysfunctional marriage.

William Douglas is portrayed in James II: Day of the Innocents which is part of "The James Plays" trilogy penned by Rona Munro. This massive theatre production portrays a fictional account (heavily based on what is accepted as facts) of the lives of three generations of Scottish kings (James I, II and III). The stabbing of Douglas by James II is in the play.

Peerage of Scotland
Preceded by James Douglas	Earl of Douglas; 1443–1452	Succeeded by James Douglas
Preceded by James Douglas	Earl of Avondale; 1443–1452	Succeeded by James Douglas
