= Royal Scots =

Infantry regiment of the British Army from 1633 to 2006

Royal Scots (The Royal Regiment)
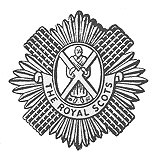
- Cap badge
- Active: 1633–2006
- Country: Kingdom of Scotland (1633–1678); Kingdom of England (1678–1707); Kingdom of Great Britain (c.1707–c.1800); Kingdom of Ireland (c. 1775); United Kingdom (1801–2006)
- Branch: British Army
- Type: Infantry
- Role: Line infantry
- Part of: Scottish Division
- Garrison/HQ: Edinburgh
- Nickname: Pontius Pilate's Bodyguard
- Patron: HRH Mary, Princess Royal (1918); HRH Anne, Princess Royal (1983)
- Mottos: Nemo me impune lacessit Latin: "Nobody harms me with impunity"
- March: Quick March: Dumbarton's Drums; Slow March: Garb of Old Gaul
- Engagements: See Battle honours list

Insignia
- Tactical recognition flash

- Royal Scots regimental badge

The Royal Scots (The Royal Regiment), once known as the Royal Regiment of Foot, was the oldest and most senior infantry regiment of the line of the British Army, having been raised in 1633 during the reign of Charles I. The regiment existed continuously until 2006, when it amalgamated with the King's Own Scottish Borderers to become the Royal Scots Borderers, which merged with the Royal Highland Fusiliers (Princess Margaret's Own Glasgow and Ayrshire Regiment), the Black Watch, the Highlanders (Seaforth, Gordons and Camerons) and the Argyll and Sutherland Highlanders to form the Royal Regiment of Scotland.

== History ==
=== 17th century ===
In April 1633, Sir John Hepburn was granted a warrant by Charles I to recruit 1200 Scots for service with the French army in the 1618–1648 Thirty Years War. The nucleus came from Hepburn's previous regiment, which fought with the Swedes from 1625 until August 1632, when Hepburn quarrelled with Gustavus Adolphus. It absorbed other Scottish units in the Swedish army, as well as those already with the French and by 1635 totalled around 8,000 men.

Sir John was killed in 1636 and succeeded as Colonel by his brother George, then, after his death in 1637, Lord James Douglas; following the custom of the time, the unit became known as Douglas' Regiment. James died in a skirmish near Douai in 1645 and was replaced by his elder brother Archibald Douglas, Earl of Angus, who remained in Scotland and had little contact with the regiment, other than supplying recruits. In 1653, he assigned the Colonelcy to his younger half-brother, George Douglas, later Earl of Dumbarton.

In 1660, Charles II was restored as king; in January 1661, Douglas's was sent to England in response to Venner's Rising, an attempted coup by Fifth Monarchists. The revolt was quickly crushed and it returned to France, since the recently elected Cavalier Parliament quickly disbanded the New Model Army but refused to fund replacements. It remained in France until 1679, apart from a period during the 1664-67 Second Anglo-Dutch War when it was based at the naval dockyard of Chatham. The diarist Pepys met George Douglas in Rochester and recorded that "Here in the streets, I did hear the Scotch march beat by the drums before the soldiers, which is very odde." In 1667, the regiment was accused of looting after the Raid on the Medway and ordered back to France; while awaiting transport, over 700 of the 1,500 men deserted.

During the 1672-74 Third Anglo-Dutch War, Douglas's was part of the British Brigade that fought with the French, commanded by the Duke of Monmouth. It served in the Rhineland throughout the Franco-Dutch War, even after the Anglo-Dutch war ended in February 1674; it became the Dumbarton' Regiment in 1675, after George Douglas was made Earl of Dumbarton. The 1678 Treaties of Nijmegen required the repatriation of all Scots and English units from France; reluctant to lose veteran troops, this was made as hard as possible. Dumbarton's was posted to the Dauphiné in Southern France before being disbanded and its men prevented from travelling for 30 days thereafter; many chose to remain, while those who arrived in England did so without money or possessions.

The regiment was listed on the English military establishment as the First Foot or Royal Scots, a temporary measure during the Exclusion Crisis of 1679–1681. Four of its twenty-one companies joined the Tangier Garrison in April 1680, with another twelve in September. It was awarded a battle honour for 'Tangier' in 1908, but the colony and its garrison was evacuated in 1684. A war diary for 1680 was kept by its commander, Sir James Halkett, allegedly one of the first examples to survive.

On its return, the unit was renamed His Majesty's Royal Regiment of Foot in June 1684. When James II succeeded Charles in 1685, the regiment fought at the decisive Battle of Sedgemoor that ended the June Monmouth Rebellion; a second battalion was raised in March 1686 and posted to Scotland.

It was the only unit where the majority remained loyal to James during the November 1688 Glorious Revolution; Dumbarton followed him into exile and one of William's subordinates, Frederick Schomberg, was appointed Colonel. While awaiting transport from Ipswich to Flanders, it mutinied on 15 March 1689, a combination of not being paid and dislike at being commanded by a foreigner. However, the mutineers were treated with leniency and later agreed to the move.

At the start of the 1688–1697 Nine Years War, Lieutenant-Colonel Sir Robert Douglas commanded the first battalion at the Battle of Walcourt in 1689. After Schomberg was killed in Ireland, he was promoted Colonel in July 1690. The second battalion arrived from Scotland in 1690 and both battalions fought at the Battle of Steenkerque in 1692, where Sir Robert was killed. They then fought at the Battle of Landen in 1693 and at the Siege of Namur. When the Treaty of Ryswick ended the war in 1697, it was transferred to Ireland.

=== 18th century ===
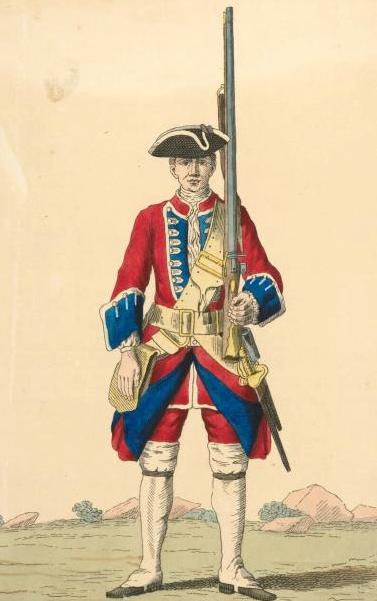
A regimental private in c. 1742

c. 1751 painting of a regimental grenadier (left)

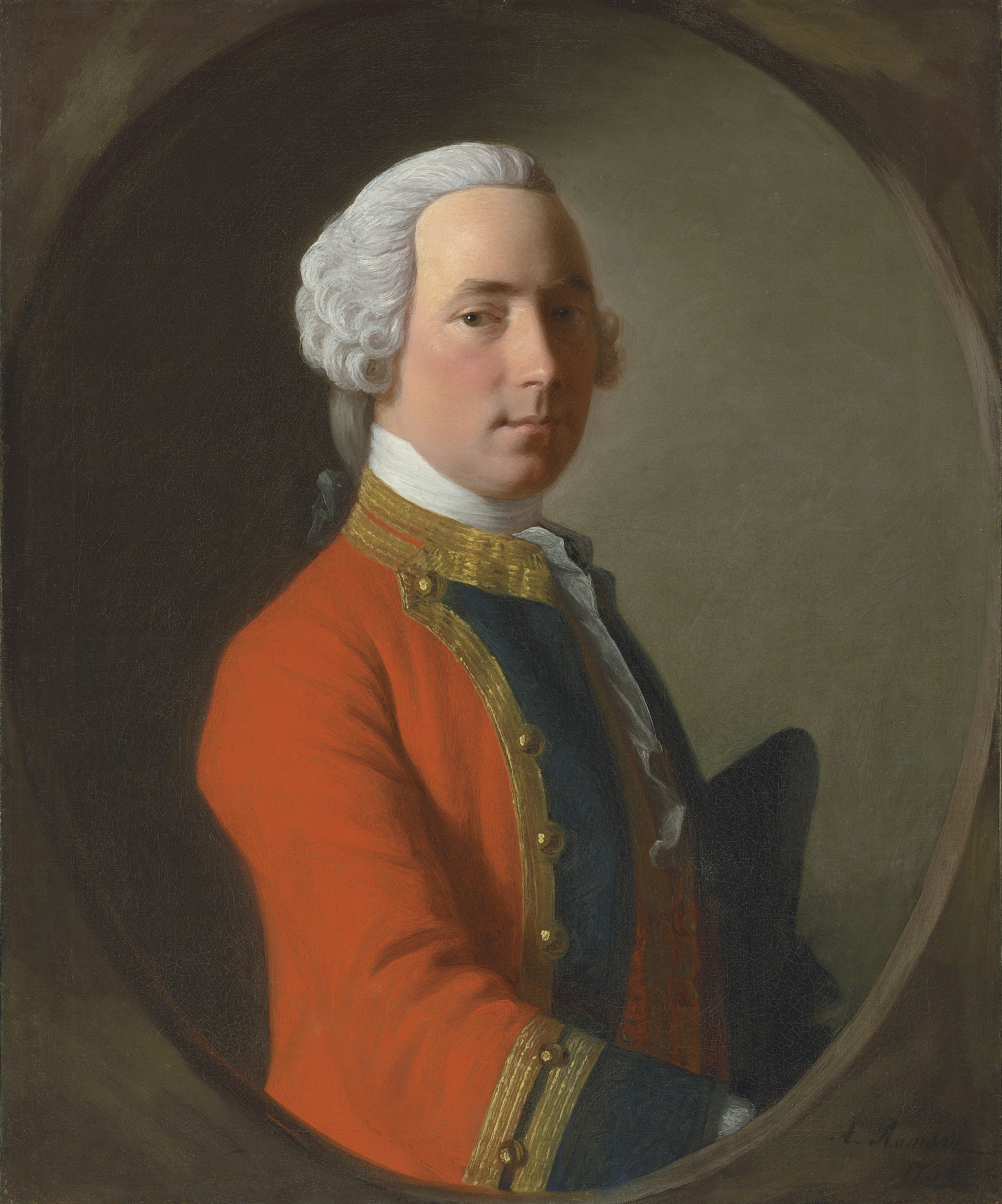
1754 portrait of a regimental lieutenant

During the War of the Spanish Succession, the regiment served under Marlborough at Schellenberg, Blenheim, Ramillies and Oudenarde. At Malplaquet in 1709, its members included William Hiseland, an 89-year-old reputed to be the last serving veteran of the First English Civil War.

Both battalions spent 1715 to 1742 in Ireland, but after this were normally separated. The 1st was based in Flanders during the War of the Austrian Succession, where it fought at Fontenoy in 1745. After returning from Puerto Bello in 1743, the 2nd helped suppress the Jacobite rising of 1745, before being posted to Ireland once again.

In the army reforms of 1751, the unit was ranked as the most senior infantry line regiment and titled the 1st (Royal) Regiment of Foot. On the outbreak of the Seven Years' War in 1756, the 2nd Battalion moved to Nova Scotia in 1757, fighting at Louisburg, Guadeloupe and Havana, then returning home in 1764.

Until the American Revolutionary War in 1775, both served as garrisons in the Mediterranean, the 1st in Gibraltar, the 2nd in Minorca. Sent to the West Indies in 1781, the 1st Battalion helped capture St Eustatius; it surrendered at St. Kitts in January 1782 but was later exchanged.

=== French Revolutionary and Napoleonic Wars ===
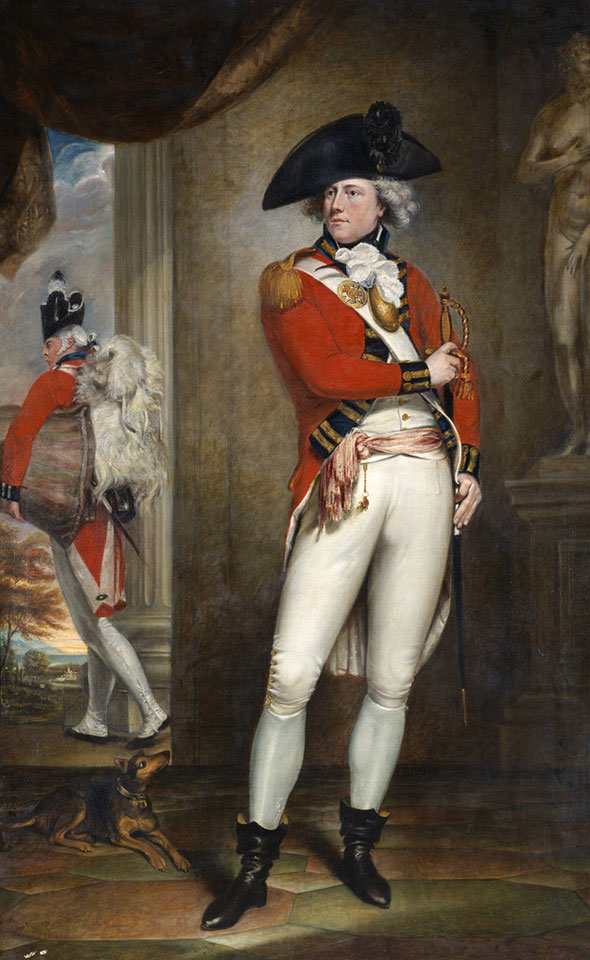
c. 1796 painting of a regimental private and captain

The 1st Battalion had returned to the West Indies as a garrison in 1790, and served there until 1797, with a brief period of combat in the Haitian Revolution. The West Indies were hotbeds of disease, and the battalion lost more than half its strength to disease in this period. It was reformed from militia volunteers in Ireland in 1798: This year saw a major rebellion erupt in Ireland after years of simmering tension. The Lothian Fencibles fought with distinction at the Battle of Vinegar Hill, one of the more important engagements of the rebellion. Subsequently, the regiment gained a new regimental song:

Ye croppies of Wexford, I'd have ye be wise
and go not to meddle with Mid-Lothian Boys
For the Mid-Lothian Boys they vow and declare
They'll crop off your head as well as your hair
derry, down, down.
Remember at Ross and at Vinegar Hill
How your heads flew about like chaff in a mill
For the Mid-Lothian Boys when a croppy they see
they blow out his daylights and tip him cut three
derry, down, down.

After the rebellion was over in Ireland they were used in minor raids on the coast of Spain in 1800. Meanwhile, from 1793 to 1801, the 2nd Battalion was based in the Mediterranean. It fought at the Siege of Toulon (1793) and the capture of Corsica (1794), returning briefly to Northern Europe for the Battle of Egmont op Zee in the 1799 Anglo-Russian invasion of Holland, before fighting in the 1801 Egyptian campaign at the Battle of Aboukir and the Battle of Alexandria.

Both battalions were subsequently dispatched to the West Indies, the 1st from 1801 to 1812, and the 2nd from 1803 to 1806. The 1st occupied Saint Thomas in 1801, fought at the capture of Saint Lucia, as well as of Demerara and Essequibo in 1803, and the capture of Guadeloupe in 1810. The 2nd then moved to India, where it would remain until 1826, whilst the 1st was sent to Quebec with the outbreak of the War of 1812. It fought in the battles of Sackett's Harbor and Buffalo & Black Rock, as well as the capture of Fort Niagara (1813), the battles of Longwoods, Chippawa, and Lundy's Lane, along with the Siege of Fort Erie and the Battle of Cook's Mills (1814). In February 1812, the regiment was retitled as the 1st Regiment of Foot (Royal Scots), the first official appearance of the popular name.

Two new battalions were raised in late 1804, at Hamilton, the 3rd and 4th Battalions. The 3rd served in the Peninsular War from 1808 to 1809, fighting at the Battle of Corunna in 1809 before being withdrawn by sea and sent to the Walcheren Campaign with the 1st Division. It returned to Portugal in 1810 with the 5th Division, fighting at the Battle of Buçaco (1810), the Battle of Fuentes de Onoro (1811), the battles of Badajoz, Salamanca and Burgos (1812), the Battle of Vitoria, capture of San Sebastián, Battle of Nivelle, and the Battle of Nive (1813), before advancing into France in 1814. It was sent to Belgium during the Hundred Days, and fought in Picton's Division (the 5th) at the Battle of Waterloo (1815). After two years in the Army of Occupation, it was disbanded at Canterbury in 1817.

The 4th was deployed to the Baltic in 1813, being involved with the recapture of Stralsund, and fought in the Netherlands in 1814, where it was captured and exchanged. It was then dispatched to Canada as part of the War of 1812, where it served as a garrison. It was withdrawn to England with the end of the fighting and disbanded at Dover in 1816.

=== 19th century ===
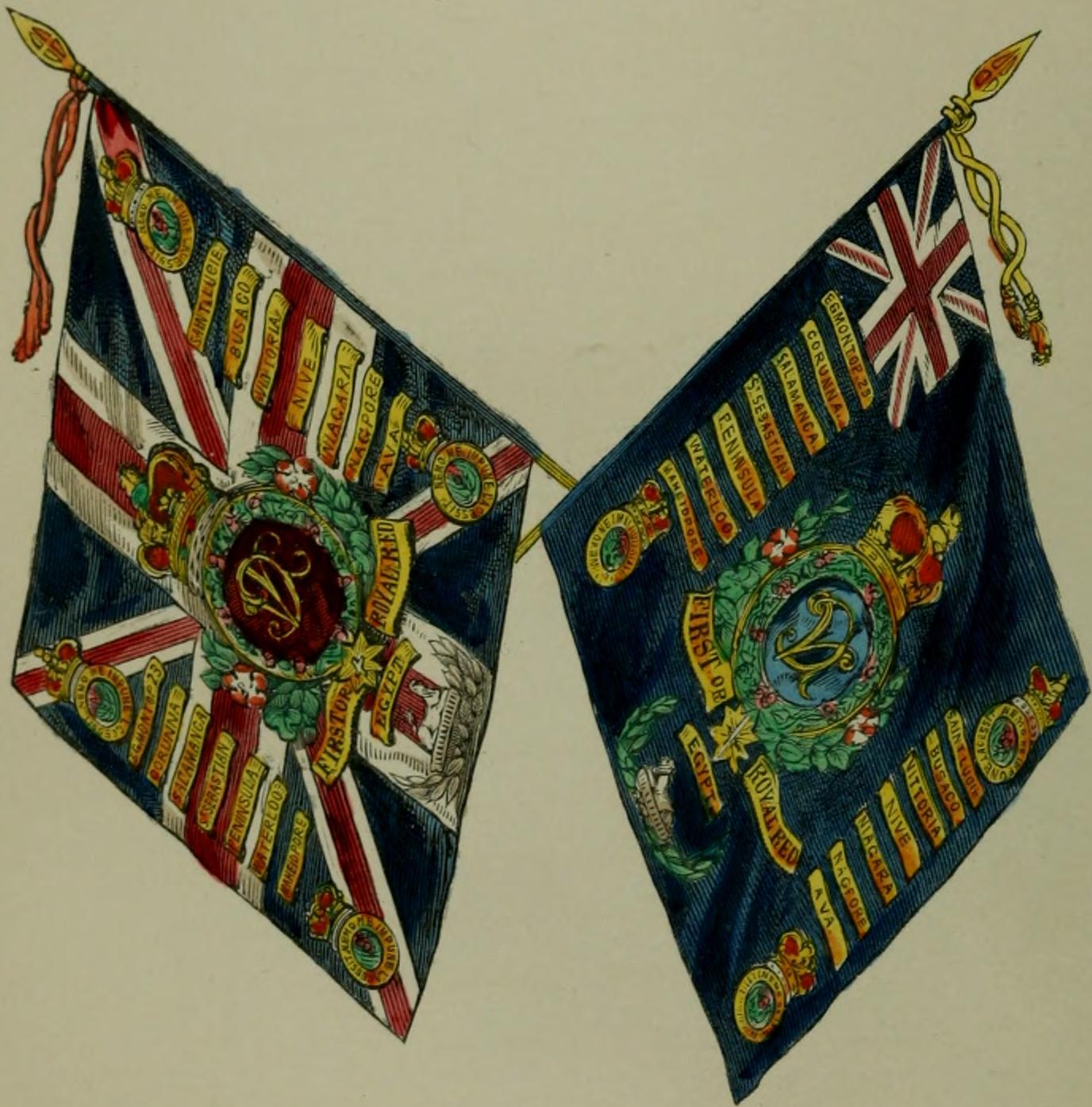
The regimental colours in 1847

The 1st battalion was sent to Ireland after the end of the Napoleonic wars, and stationed there from 1816 until 1825, when it was moved to the West Indies, where it remained until 1835. The 2nd battalion, however, had a more active time; based in India, it was involved in the Third Anglo-Maratha War, where it fought at the Battle of Nagpore (1817) and Battle of Mahidpur (1818), and in the First Anglo-Burmese War of 1824–26. It moved to Scotland in 1830, and to Canada in 1836, where it was involved in the Rebellions of 1837. The regiment fought at the Battle of Saint-Denis (1837), but was running low on ammunition as the British officers had underestimated the amount of insurgents, and with the enemy beginning to flank, Colonel Charles Gore gave the order to withdraw. A move to the West Indies in 1843 was complicated by half the regiment being shipwrecked and delayed several months, but was successful, and the regiment finally returned to Scotland in 1846.

Both battalions saw active service in the Crimean War, with the 1st fighting at the battles of Alma and Inkerman (1854), and both fighting in the Siege of Sevastopol (1854–55), where the regiment's first VC was won. After the war, the 1st battalion moved to Ceylon in 1857 and thence to India, returning home in 1870, whilst the 2nd battalion moved to Hong Kong, and saw action in the Second Opium War, fighting at the capture of the Taku Forts (1858) and Pekin (1860), and returning home in 1861.

In 1881, following comprehensive reforms following the Crimean war (Cardwell Reforms of 1870), the ambitious Childers Reforms were passed by the War Office. Among many changes was the merger of the many numbered regiments of foot into un-numbered 'county regiments'. Because the regiment already had two battalions, it fared much better than the many other regiments which lost their identities and merged into new two-battalion regiments. Under the February 1881 proposals, the regiment was due to be redesignated as The Lothian Regiment (Royal Scots), however under the final July reform, the regiment became The Royal Scots (Lothian Regiment). Under the previously mentioned reforms, the regiment became a county regiment, encompassing the following: City of Edinburgh (Midlothian), Haddingtonshire (East Lothian), Linlithgowshire (West Lothian), and Berwickshire (later transferred to the King's Own Scottish Borderers on 1 May 1887). In addition to the two regular battalions and depot, the regiment now took control of the various militia and infantry (rifle) volunteers based in the above counties. This left the regiment with the following structure:

- Regimental Headquarters, at Edinburgh Castle, Edinburgh
- Regimental Depot (part of the 1st Regimental District), at Glencorse Barracks, Glencorse
- 1st Battalion – regular, previously 1st Battalion, 1st (Royal Scots) Regiment of Foot
- 2nd Battalion – regular, previously 2nd Battalion, 1st (Royal Scots) Regiment of Foot
- 3rd Battalion (The Queen's Edinburgh Regiment of Light Infantry) – Militia
- 1st Edinburgh (City) Rifle Volunteers (The Queen's City of Edinburgh Rifle Volunteer Brigade) – three battalions forming the main Rifle Volunteers element – forming the 1st volunteer battalion of the regiment
- 2nd Edinburgh (City) Rifle Volunteer Corps – 2nd volunteer battalion of the regiment
- 1st Midlothian (Leith) Rifle Volunteer Corps – 3rd volunteer battalion of the regiment
- 2md Midlothian (Midlothian & Peebles-shire) Rifle Volunteer Corps – 4th volunteer battalion of the regiment
- 1st Linlithgowshire Rifle Volunteer Corps – 5th volunteer battalion of the regiment
- 1st Haddington Rifle Volunteer Corps – 6th volunteer battalion of the regiment

In 1881, the 1st was in the West Indies; it moved to South Africa in 1884, when it saw action in the Bechuanaland campaign, and remained there until 1891, when it moved back to the UK to serve as the depot battalion and the 2nd moved out to India. With the outbreak of the Second Anglo-Boer War, the 1st was quickly earmarked for service in South Africa, and sailed in late 1899. It remained there until 1903, being joined by the 3rd from 1900 to 1902 – the first time a non-regular unit of the regiment had been activated. The bulk of the time in South Africa was spent patrolling and in mobile columns, with neither battalion engaged in any major battles. The 2nd battalion was posted in India in 1891, and stayed there until 1909. The battalion had various postings around the sub-continent, including Poona until late 1902 when it moved to Kamptee.

In 1908, the Volunteers and Militia were reorganised nationally, with the former becoming the Territorial Force and the latter the Special Reserve; the regiment now had one Reserve and seven Territorial battalions. The 1st moved back to India in 1909, relieving the 2nd, which moved back to the UK; they remained stationed there until 1914.

=== First World War (1914–1919) ===
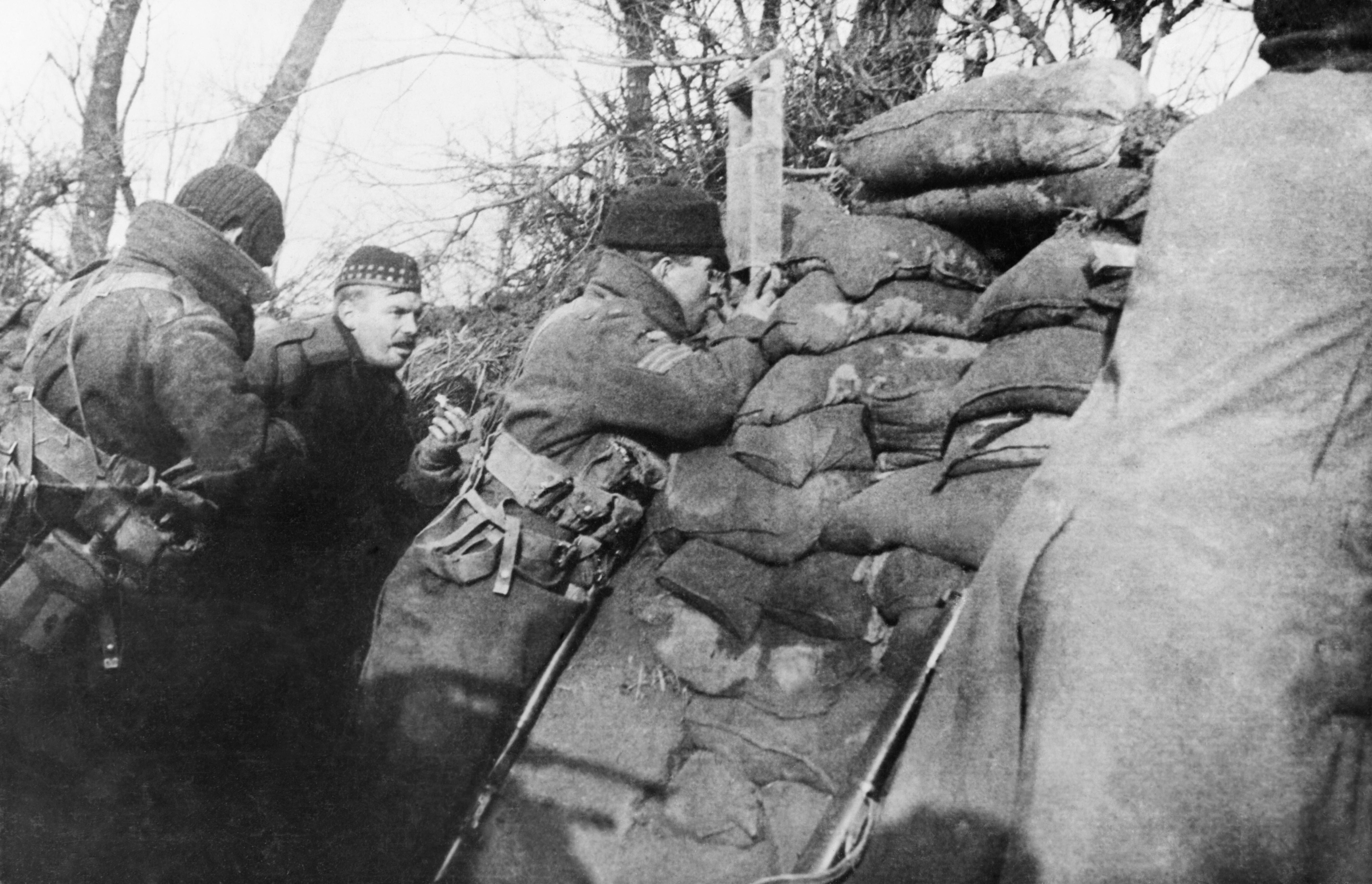
A regimental sergeant using a trench periscope to observe German trenches near Kemmel, January 1915

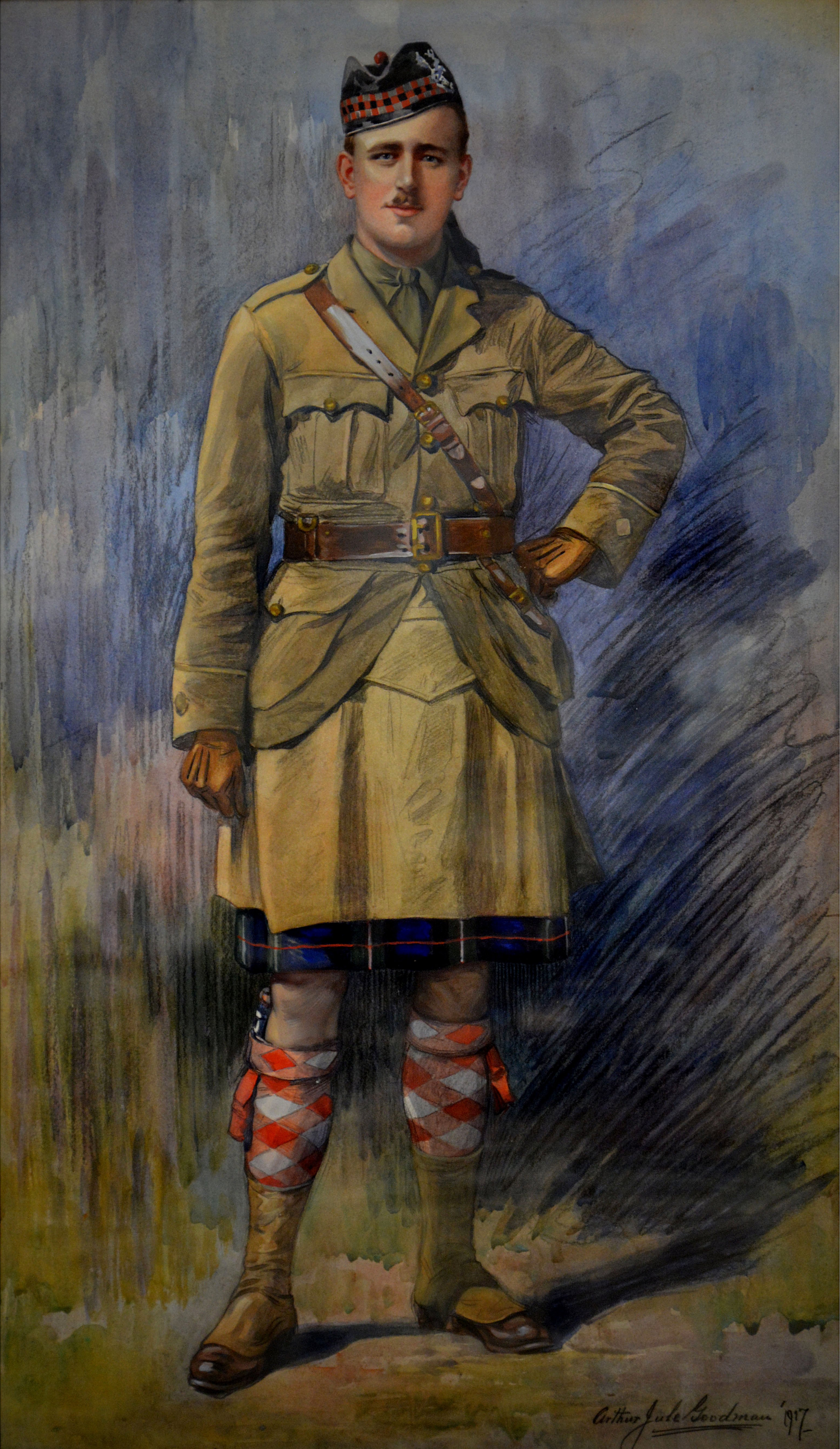
1917 portrait of a regimental soldier

At the outbreak of the First World War, the 1st was in India, and returned to the UK in November; the 2nd was immediately deployed with the British Expeditionary Force (BEF), arriving in France on 14 August and seeing action on the afternoon of the 23rd. The Special Reserve had been mobilised, with the 3rd Battalion activated at Weymouth, and all seven battalions of the Territorial Force had mobilised and raised an additional second-line battalion by the end of 1914. A further seven battalions of the New Army were formed in 1914, including two Pals battalions By the end of 1914, the regiment stood at a strength of 24 battalions; another six Territorial battalions and three New Army battalions (one of bantams) were formed in 1915. In 1916, one service and one reserve battalion were formed by merging depleted Territorial battalions, and in 1917 a labour battalion was formed. In total, the Royal Scots raised some thirty-five battalions of infantry and over 100,000 men during the course of the First World War, of which fifteen battalions saw active service. 11,000 soldiers serving in the regiment were killed, and over 40,000 wounded. Among other decorations and honours, the regiment won six Victoria Crosses.

The 1st, on returning from India, was placed in the 27th Division, a division made up of regular units that had been recalled from garrison duty, and arrived in France in December 1914. It saw combat in the action of Saint-Éloi and throughout the Second Battle of Ypres in 1915, before the division was withdrawn and moved to Salonika in November, where it spent the rest of the war It was sent to Georgia in December 1918 for operations against the Bolsheviks, and returned to Edinburgh in May 1919.

The 2nd was part of the 3rd Division, one of the first units of the British Expeditionary Force to be sent to France. It first saw action in the Battle of Mons, and thence at almost all of the major actions on the Western Front, before returning to Scotland in 1919.

The 1/4th (Queen's Edinburgh Rifles) and 1/7th mobilised in Edinburgh in August 1914, and were assigned to the 52nd (Lowland) Division. Whilst the division was mobilising, the 1/7th was involved in the Quintinshill rail crash, which killed 210 officers and men and wounded another 224. They fought at the Gallipoli campaign before being moved to Egypt in 1916 and serving in the Sinai and Palestine Campaign. They were sent to France in April 1918 for the Second Battle of the Somme, and remained there until the end of the war. Both battalions were reduced to a cadre in March 1919, and returned home to disband in May.

The 1/5th (Queen's Edinburgh Rifles) mobilised in Edinburgh in August 1914, and were assigned to the 29th Division. A poignant Christmas card was produced by the Edinburgh artist Walter Balmer Hislop who served with 'D' Company of the 5th (QER) Battalion. They fought at the Battle of Gallipoli, then to France via Egypt, and saw action on the first day on the Somme. The 1/6th had mobilised at the same time and been dispatched to Egypt in 1915 for the Western Frontier Force; it too was withdrawn to France for the Somme. The two heavily depleted battalions were amalgamated in July 1916, and spent the remainder of war on the Western Front as the 5/6th. After the war, it remained in Belgium until January 1919 when it moved into Germany, and was reduced to a cadre in October 1919 and sent home to be disbanded.

The 1/8th mobilised at Haddington in August 1914, and arrived in France in November – the first Scottish territorial unit to arrive in France – with the 7th Division, though they did not see action until the Battle of Neuve Chapelle. After the Second Battle of Ypres, in August 1915, they were transferred to the 51st (Highland) Division as the divisional pioneers, and disbanded in March 1919 at Haddington The 1/9th mobilised at Edinburgh in August 1914, and moved to France in February 1915 with the 27th Division; when this moved to Salonika in November they remained in France, transferring to the 5th Division, and then to Third Army reserve. They were assigned to the 51st (Highland) Division in March 1916, with whom they fought for two years, then to the 61st (2nd South Midland) Division and 15th (Scottish) Division in 1918.

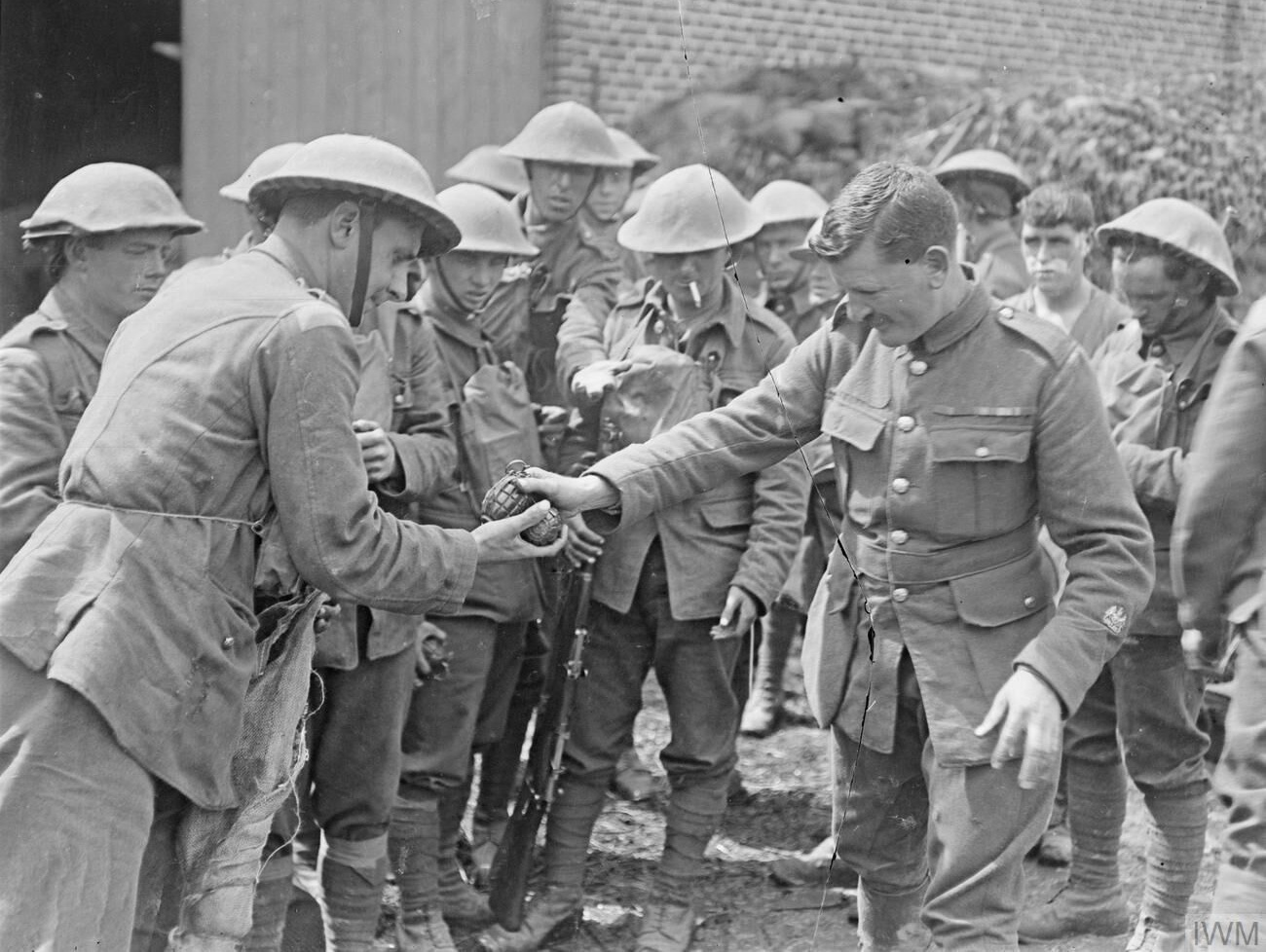
A regimental raiding party preparing for action, July 1918

The 11th, 12th and 13th were raised in August 1914 in Edinburgh, with the 11th and 12th allocated to 9th (Scottish) Division and the 13th to 15th (Scottish) Division, and moved to France in mid-1915. They first saw action at the Battle of Loos, where the 11th was almost wiped out, and spent the remainder of the war on the Western Front. The 11th and 12th moved to Germany after the armistice; the 12th was reduced to a cadre in April 1919 and disbanded in the UK in June, whilst the 11th was reduced to a cadre and disbanded at Cologne in November. The 13th remained in Belgium, being reduced to a cadre in March 1919 and disbanded in the UK in June.

The 15th was raised in September 1914, the 16th (which came to be known as McCrae's Battalion) in December 1914, and the 17th in February 1915, in Edinburgh. The 15th and 16th were assigned to the 34th Division and the 17th to the 35th Division, moved to France in early 1916, and first saw action at the first day on the Somme; all three spent the remainder of the war on the Western Front. The 15th and 16th were reduced to cadres in May 1918 and disbanded in August; the 17th was based in Belgium after the armistice, and provided internal security in France and Belgium in early 1919, before being reduced to a cadre in April and disbanded shortly afterward.

The 2/10th was originally mobilised as bicycle infantry, but never served in this role. It was the only second-line battalion of the regiment to be sent overseas, moving to Archangel in August 1918, and serving in the North Russia Campaign until June 1919, when it returned to Scotland to disband. The remaining battalions all remained in the UK on Home Service, and did not see active duty. However, six saw significant periods of service in Ireland, where they served as garrison units, and were often involved in local security – armed patrols, mobile columns to 'show the flag', and the like.

=== Inter-war period (1919–1939) ===
The regiment was reduced sharply in size following the Armistice; during 1919, the 3rd Battalion disbanded, as did all bar one of the Territorial battalions (the one exception being the 2/10th, which was finally disbanded in February 1920).

In September 1919, the 1st Battalion again embarked for imperial service, taking up garrison duties in Rangoon, and in August 1920 the 2nd Battalion was sent to Ireland for service in what would later become the Anglo-Irish War; they would remain there until January 1922.

When the Territorial Force was reconstituted as the Territorial Army in 1920, all seven Territorial battalions of the regiment were reconstituted. At the beginning of 1921, the regiment was formally retitled The Royal Scots (The Royal Regiment), and comprised two regular battalions, one Supplementary Reserve battalion, and four battalions of the newly renamed Territorial Army, all four of which were activated during the 1921 coal strike. In January 1922, reductions in the military led to the amalgamation of the Territorial component into two battalions. The three battalions not retained in 1921 were converted to support units outside the regimental structure. The 4th/5th Battalion was later, in 1938, transferred to the Royal Engineers and converted into an anti-aircraft role, becoming the 4th/5th Battalion, The Royal Scots (The Royal Regiment) (52nd Searchlight Regiment). It was later transferred to the Royal Artillery in August 1940 as the 52nd (Queen's Edinburgh, Royal Scots) Searchlight Regiment, Royal Artillery.

The 1st Battalion moved from Rangoon to Secunderabad in 1922, then to Aden in 1925. They finally returned to the UK in 1926, barracked at Maryhill in Glasgow, where they saw duty in the General Strike. Under the Cardwell system, it was common for one battalion to remain at home while the other one served overseas, and accordingly in January 1926 the 2nd Battalion moved to Egypt, then to China in 1928. In 1930, they moved to Quetta, then Lahore in 1934, and finally Hong Kong in January 1938. At the same time, the 1st Battalion was deployed to serve in the 1936–39 Arab revolt in Palestine, where it would remain for a year, until January 1939, when it became part of the 4th Infantry Brigade, 2nd Infantry Division. Some sources suggest the 1st Battalion was briefly reorganised as a machine-gun battalion during this period.

With the re-armament program in the late 1930s, the Territorial component of the regiment was heavily altered; one of the two battalions was converted into an anti-aircraft role in 1938 whilst the other formed a duplicate 8th Battalion on 2 August 1939.

=== Second World War (1939–1945) ===
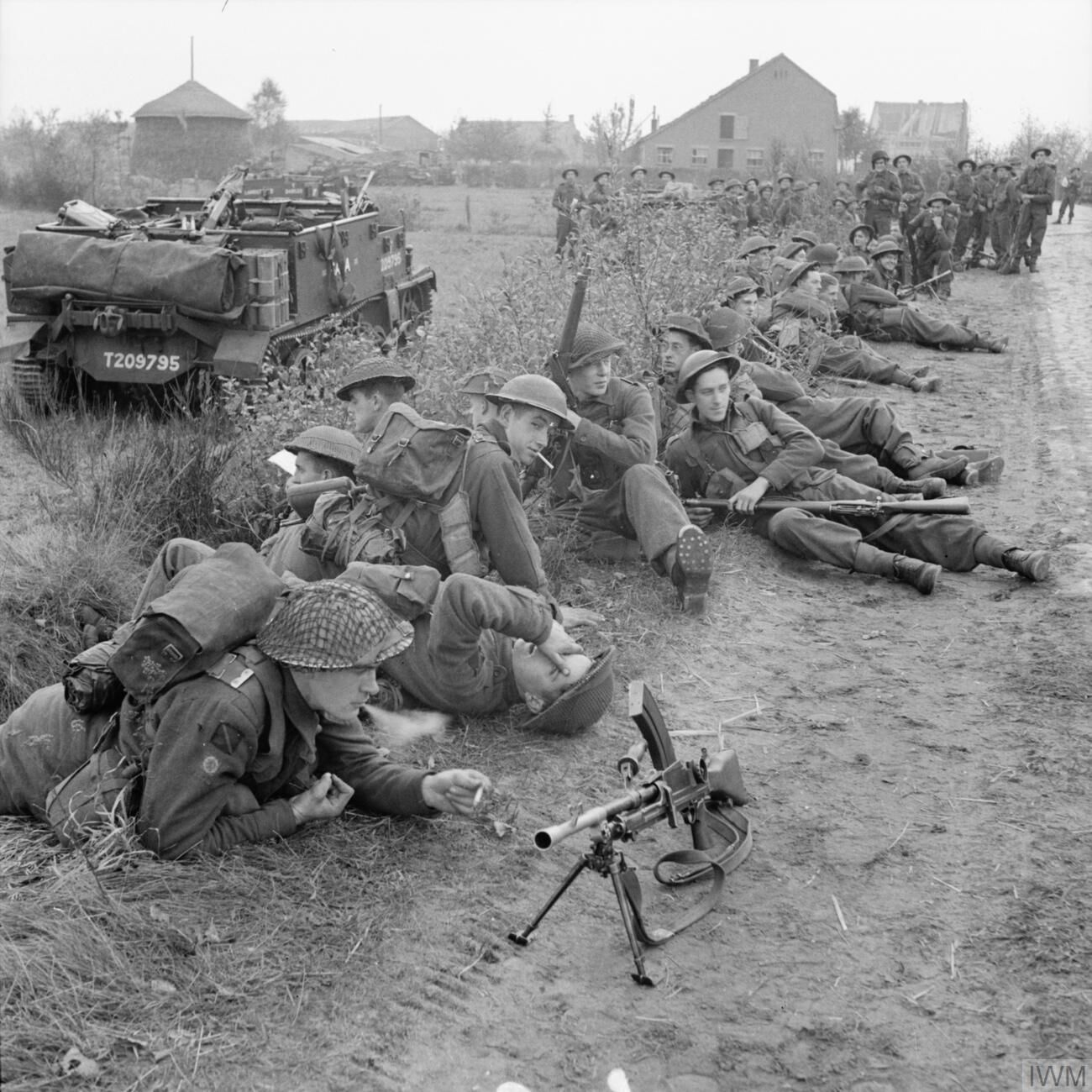
Universal Carriers and regimental troops pause in Tilburg, 27 October 1944

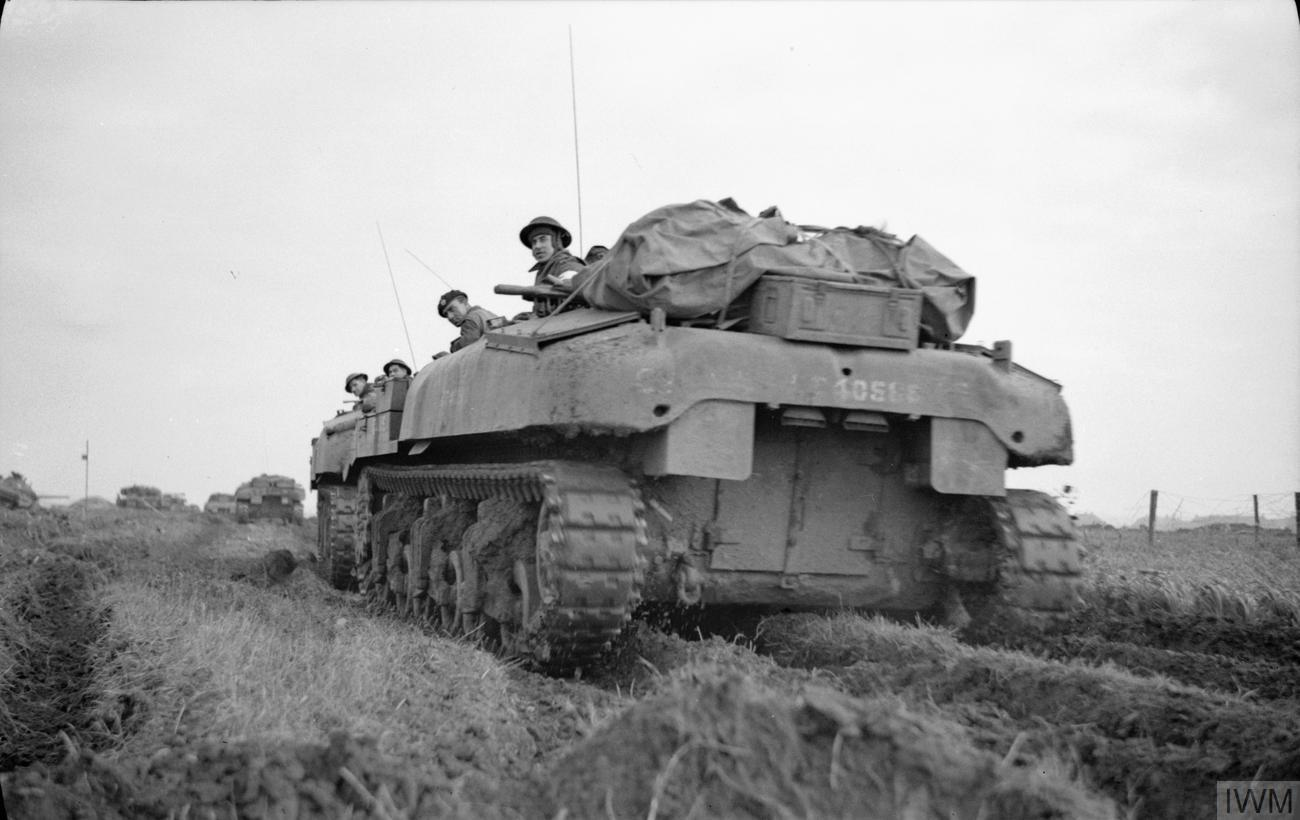
Regimental soldiers in Kangaroo APCs, December 1944

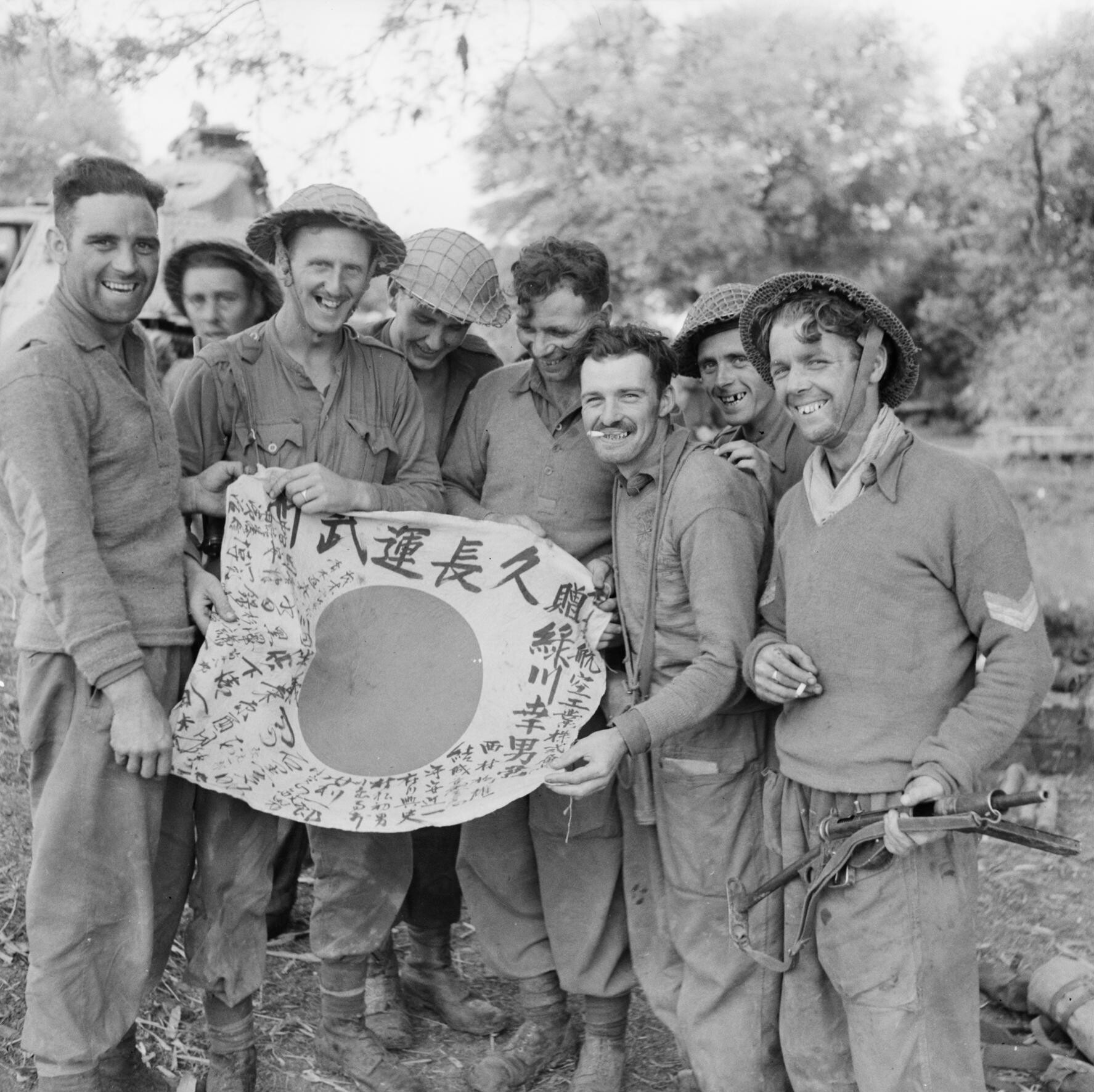
Regimental troops pose with a captured Japanese flag taken near Shwebo, January 1945

At the outbreak of the Second World War on 3 September 1939, the 1st Battalion, Royal Scots was at Aldershot as part of 4th Infantry Brigade, alongside the 1st Border Regiment and 2nd Royal Norfolk Regiment, 2nd Infantry Division; accordingly, it deployed to France with the British Expeditionary Force (BEF). It moved to Lecelles in September, and in May 1940 moved into Belgium during the Battle of France. The BEF were heavily hit by the German Army's breakthrough, however, and fell back towards the coast; the battalion was deployed at Le Paradis, near Béthune, on 25 May to protect the flanks of the Dunkirk evacuation. After being heavily hit by armoured attacks, the battalion ceased fighting on the afternoon of 27 May. The adjacent unit, the 2nd Battalion, Royal Norfolks, had almost one hundred men taken prisoner and later shot by their captors in the Le Paradis massacre. Recent research has suggested that around twenty Royal Scots suffered a similar fate. The remnants of the battalion were reconstituted in Bradford in June. After Dunkirk, the battalion spent nearly two years on home defence preparing for a potential German invasion of the United Kingdom. The 1st Royal Scots, along with the rest of the 2nd Division, was sent to British India in April 1942 to train for jungle warfare.

The two Territorial Army units, the 7th/9th Battalion, which was the 7th and 9th battalions merged, and 8th Battalion, mobilised in Scotland in September; the 7th/9th was briefly deployed to France with the 155th Infantry Brigade, alongside the 4th and 5th King's Own Scottish Borderers, of the 52nd (Lowland) Infantry Division before the collapse of the French government, but was quickly withdrawn. The regiment raised a fifth battalion in June 1940; it was created as the 50th (Holding) Battalion in June 1940 where it would 'hold' men who were medically unfit, temporarily homeless or on a course etc. but redesignated the 12th Battalion in October 1940. Also raised were the 10th and 11th (Home Defence) battalions, raised in late 1939 specifically for defensive duties in the United Kingdom. Both battalions, like most others of the same type, would have consisted mainly of older and less fit men, with previous military experience, together with younger soldiers. The 11th, however, was disbanded in 1940 and, in 1941, the 10th dropped the 'Home Defence' subtitle and was redesignated as the 30th Battalion but was disbanded in 1943.

Most of 1941 passed without active duty for the regiment, and with growing concerns about the stability of the Far East, the 2nd Battalion, still based at Hong Kong, moved into defensive positions around the colony. On 8 December, the Battle of Hong Kong began a few hours after the attack on Pearl Harbor; after bitter fighting, the garrison surrendered on Christmas Day. The newly formed 12th Battalion was disbanded and reformed as the 2nd Battalion in May 1942.

In April 1942 the 1st Battalion, Royal Scots was moved to Bombay, and then to Chittagong in December, still with 2nd Infantry Division. It fought in the Burma Campaign, first seeing action in the Arakan operations from March to May 1943, and then withdrawing into India. It later saw action at the Battle of Kohima in 1944 and the Battle of Mandalay in 1945. It was withdrawn to India to rest and refit in April 1945, and moved to Singapore in December.

The new 2nd Battalion was moved to Gibraltar in April 1943, and moved to Italy in July 1944, where it saw action in the Italian Campaign, in the Anzio Campaign and on the Gothic Line, with the 66th Infantry Brigade, which was part of the 1st Infantry Division. The 2nd Royal Scots were serving in 66th Brigade alongside the 1st Hertfordshire Regiment and 11th Lancashire Fusiliers. In January 1945 it moved to Palestine with the rest of the 1st Infantry Division, where it was active in security duties in October and November, and was then redeployed to the Suez Canal Zone in December 1945.

The 7th/9th Battalion was still part of the 155th Infantry Brigade and was attached to the 52nd (Lowland) Infantry Division, which was trained for mountain warfare and airlanding operations, but was never used in this way. In October 1944 they moved to the Netherlands, fighting in the Battle of the Scheldt as part of the First Canadian Army, where the 52nd Division served with distinction, and then participating in Operation Blackcock and the advance to the Rhine; it crossed the Rhine in March 1945 and advanced to Bremen by the end of the war.

The 8th Battalion, Royal Scots was raised on 2 August 1939 as a 2nd Line duplicate of the 7th/9th Battalion. They remained in the United Kingdom as part of 44th (Lowland) Infantry Brigade, alongside the 6th Royal Scots Fusiliers and 6th King's Own Scottish Borderers. The brigade was a part of the 15th (Scottish) Infantry Division, which would gain an excellent reputation in the campaign, and itself was formed a 2nd Line duplicate of the 1st Line 52nd Division. In June 1944, they landed in Normandy as part of Operation Overlord and fought in the Battle for Caen in Operation Epsom and later at the Second Battle of the Odon and Operation Bluecoat. They then fought in the North West Europe Campaign, from Paris to the Rhine, until the end of the war; it entered Belgium in September, crossed the Rhine in March 1945 and advanced to Hamburg by the end of the war.

=== Post-war period (1945–2004) ===
In February 1949, the 2nd Battalion disbanded, leaving the regiment with only a single regular battalion for the first time since the 17th century.

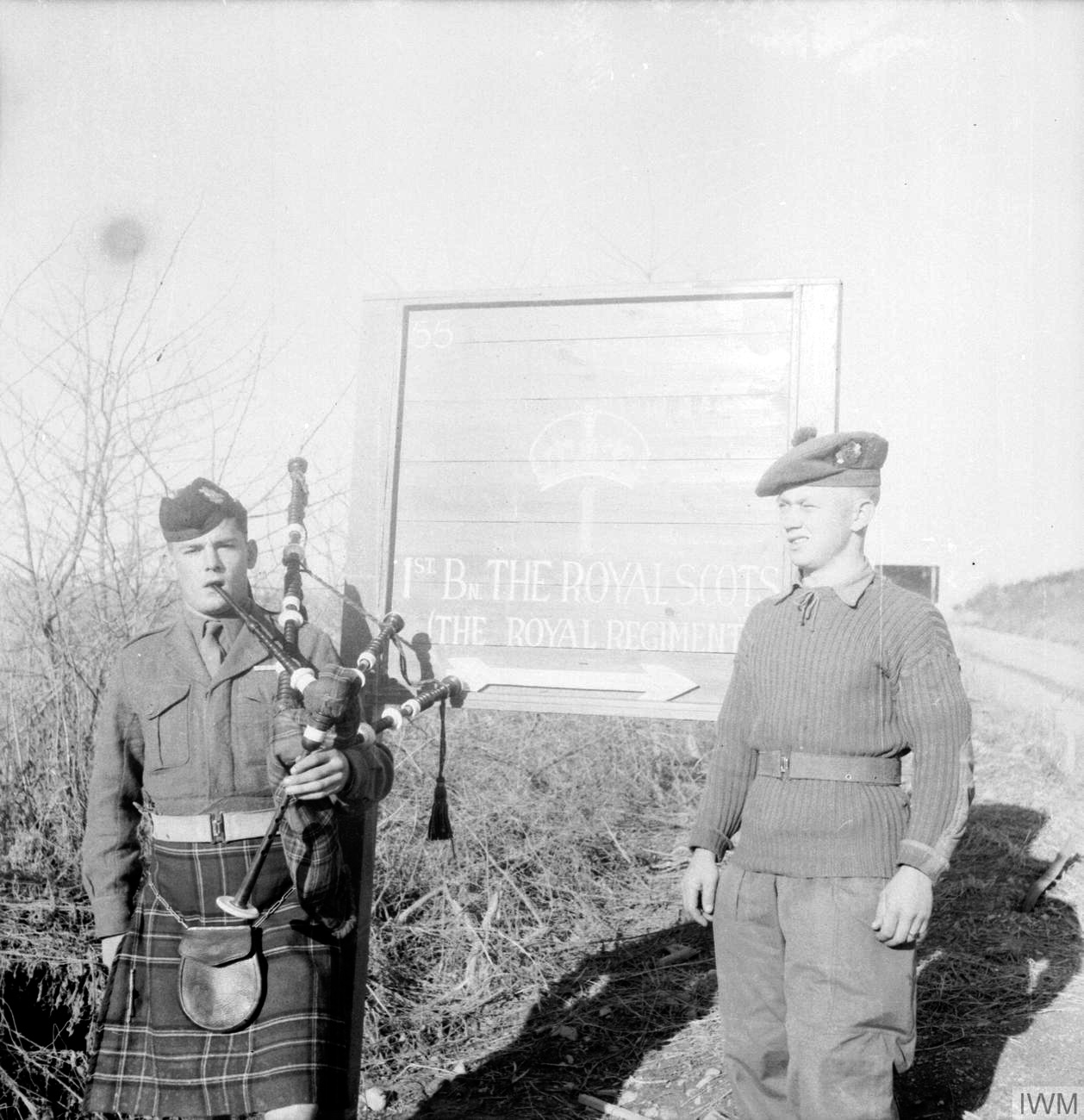
A piper of the regiment in Korea, 25 December 1953

The 7th/9th (Highlanders) and 8th Battalions were reconstituted in the Territorial Army in 1947. Both battalions remained until 1961, when the latter was absorbed and the single battalion retitled the 8th/9th Battalion. In 1967 this was disbanded and reconstituted as two separate companies, A Company (The Royal Scots) of the 52nd Lowland Volunteers, and A Company (8th/9th Royal Scots) of The Royal Scots and Cameronians Territorials. By 1971, both companies were in the battalions of the 52nd Lowland Volunteers, and though the Royal Scots name was retained in the title the regiment no longer had a Territorial Army element.

The 1st Battalion briefly saw service in the Korean War in 1953, as part of 29th Infantry Brigade; after a brief spell in Egypt, they deployed to Cyprus from June 1955 to February 1956. They then spent two years in England, two in Berlin, one in Scotland, two in Libya, and four in England. In 1964, they deployed to Aden, then back to England and a three-year spell in Germany with the British Army of the Rhine.

1970 to 1974 was spent in Britain as part of the Allied Command Europe Mobile Force, with the battalion undertaking two four-month tours of duty in Northern Ireland. The battalion was then posted to Cyprus in early 1974. Unfortunately, Turkey invaded the island and created the "Green Line", which still partitions the island. During the action of moving service families and holidaymakers to safety from Limassol, Piper Malcolm Halliday played at the roadside becoming known as "The piper of Cyprus". This had put the Regiment on a war footing and they were involved in riots attacking RAF Akrotiri and protection of the Sovereign Area Base of Episkopi. They were relieved in early 1975 returning unexpectedly to Kirknewton near Edinburgh and did a further four-month tour of Northern Ireland, where three soldiers were lost in a roadside bomb attack. They moved to Münster in mid-1976 as the Nuclear Convoy Battalion charged with the protection of 8 Regiment RCT. In this role, the Battalion was equipped with Land Rovers, a change from the normal equipment used by previous and subsequent NCB units, which were armoured infantry battalions. Returning to Scotland in 1979, C Company was detached as 'C Battalion' providing administrative support to the Edinburgh Tattoo. In 1980, they undertook a two-month tour in Northern Ireland, and moved there under 39th Infantry Brigade in 1981 for a two-year deployment. In 1983, they returned to Kirknewton for two years and during this time they were deployed to the Falkland Islands for four months. In 1985, they returned to Germany, deploying to the Persian Gulf in 1990 for Operation Desert Storm.

In 1994, the battalion gained a company of Gurkhas, who were later transferred to The Highlanders. Deployment in the 1990s included a further one-year tour to Northern Ireland. The Battalion was deployed to Bosnia for the first time as part of SFOR in September 2002 for six months prior to their deployment in November 2003 to Iraq as part of Operation Telic for six months, returning to Iraq again in January 2006.

=== Restructuring of the Infantry (2004–2006) ===
Until 2004, the Royal Scots had been one of five line infantry regiments never to be amalgamated in its entire history, a claim shared by The Green Howards, The Cheshire Regiment, The Royal Welch Fusiliers and The King's Own Scottish Borderers. When five Scottish regiments were amalgamated to form the Royal Regiment of Scotland on 28 March 2006, the Royal Scots Battalion and the King's Own Scottish Borderers Battalion initially maintained their identities as separate battalions.

However almost immediately the Ministry of Defence moved to amalgamate the two battalions. This was not a new idea: the origins of the combined entity, Royal Scots Borderers, dates from the 1990 Options for Change review, when it was initially announced that the Royal Scots and King's Own Scottish Borderers would amalgamate. That amalgamation was subsequently rescinded. The Royal Scots Battalion and King's Own Scottish Borderers Battalion duly amalgamated on 1 August 2006 – upon their amalgamation, the new battalion took the name Royal Scots Borderers, 1st Battalion Royal Regiment of Scotland.

The remaining Territorial element of the Royal Scots, a rifle company of 52nd Lowland Regiment, was likewise amalgamated, becoming A (Royal Scots Borderers) Company of 6th Battalion, The Royal Regiment of Scotland.

== Regimental museum ==
The Museum of the Royal Scots (The Royal Regiment) and the Royal Regiment of Scotland is located in Edinburgh Castle. Operating as an independent museum, the exhibits include dioramas, uniforms, medals, weapons, drums, ceremonial regalia and silver. Displays focus on the regiment's activities since its founding in 1633 up to contemporary Army life.

== Alliances ==
- (Canada) The Canadian Scottish Regiment (Princess Mary's)
- (Canada) Royal Newfoundland Regiment

== Battle honours ==
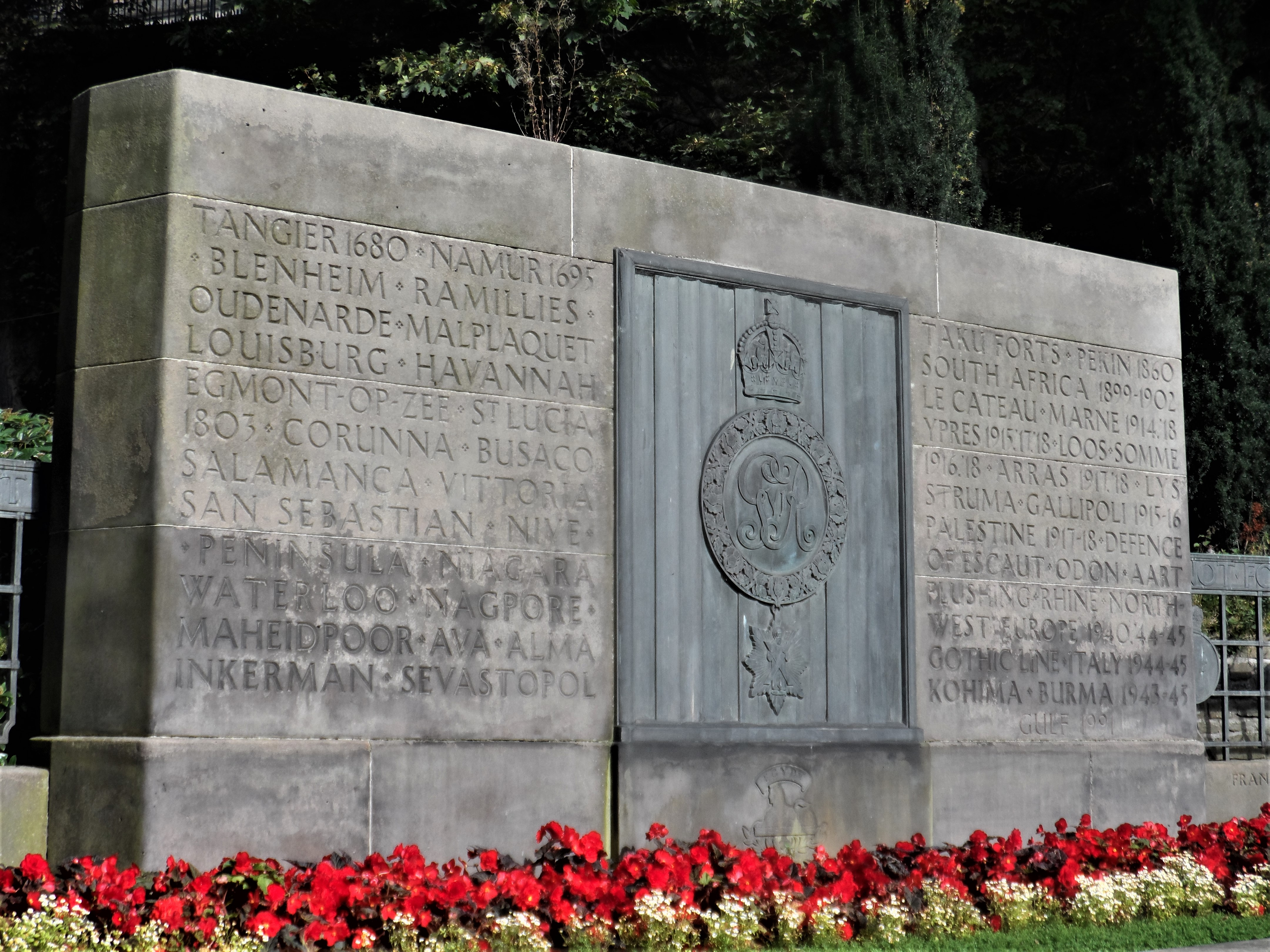
Battle honours listed on the regimental memorial, Edinburgh

The regiment's battle honours were as follows:

- Tangier 1680, Namur 1695, Blenheim, Ramillies, Oudenarde, Malplaquet, Louisburg, Havannah, Egmont-op-Zee, Egypt, St Lucia 1803, Corunna, Busaco, Salamanca, Vittoria, San Sebastian, Nive, Peninsula, Niagara, Waterloo, Nagpore, Maheidpoor, Ava, Alma, Inkerman, Sevastopol, Taku Forts, Pekin 1860, South Africa 1899–1902
- World War I (33 battalions): Mons, Le Cateau, Retreat from Mons, Marne 1914 '18, Aisne 1914, La Bassée 1914, Neuve Chapelle, Ypres 1915 '17 '18, Gravenstafel, St Julien, Frezenberg, Bellewaarde, Aubers, Festubert 1915, Loos, Somme 1916 '18, Albert 1916 '18, Bazentin, Pozières, Flers-Courcelette, Le Transloy, Ancre Heights, Ancre 1916 '18, Arras 1917 '18, Scarpe 1917 '18, Arleux, Pilckem, Langemarck 1917, Menin Road, Polygon Wood, Poelcappelle, Passchendaele, Cambrai 1917, St Quentin, Rosières, Lys, Estaires, Messines 1918, Hazebrouck, Bailleul, Kemmel, Béthune, Soissonnais-Ourcq, Tardenois, Amiens, Bapaume 1918, Drocourt-Quéant, Hindenburg Line, Canal du Nord, St Quentin Canal, Beaurevoir, Courtrai, Selle, Sambre, France and Flanders 1914–18, Struma, Macedonia 1915–18, Helles, Landing at Helles, Krithia, Suvla, Scimitar Hill, Gallipoli 1915–16, Rumani, Egypt 1915–16, Gaza, El Mughar, Nebi Samwil, Jaffa, Palestine 1917–18, Archangel 1918-19
- World War II: Dyle, Defence of Escaut, St Omer-La Bassée, Odon, Cheux, Defence of Rauray, Caen, Esquay, Mont Pincon, Aart, Nederrijn, Best, Scheldt, Flushing, Meijel, Venlo Pocket, Roer, Rhineland, Reichswald, Cleve, Goch, Rhine, Uelzen, Bremen, Artlenberg, North-West Europe 1940, '44–45, Gothic Line, Marradi, Monte Gamberaldi, Italy 1944–45, South East Asia 1941, Donbaik, Kohima, Relief of Kohima, Aradura, Shwebo, Mandalay, Burma 1943–45
- Wadi Al Batin, Gulf 1991

== Colonels-in-Chief ==
The Colonels-in-Chief of the regiment were:

- 1918–1965: Princess Mary, The Princess Royal, CI, GCVO, GBE, RRC, TD
- 1983–2006: Princess Anne, The Princess Royal, KG, KT, GCVO

== Regimental Colonels ==
Colonels of the Regiment were:

- April 1633: Col. Sir John Hepburn; killed at the siege of Saverne, Alsace, July 1636;
- September 1636: Col. George Hepburn; killed outside Damvillers, October 1637;
- October 1637: Col. Lord James Douglas; died at Douai, 1645;
- November 1645: Col. Archibald Douglas, Earl of Angus; remained in Scotland and had little contact with the regiment, other than supplying recruits;
- 21 October 1655: Lt-Gen. George Douglas, 1st Earl of Dumbarton; removed from command following the November 1688 Glorious Revolution, died in France 1692;

His Majesty's Royal Regiment of Foot (1684)

- 31 December 1688: Gen. Frederick Schomberg, 1st Duke of Schomberg; Colonel but served as commander of Williamite forces in Ireland 1689–1690; killed at the Battle of the Boyne, July 1690;
- 5 March 1691: Col. Sir Robert Douglas, 3rd Baronet; appointed Lieutenant-Colonel by James in October 1688, confirmed by William in March 1689, commanded the regiment in Flanders, confirmed as Colonel March 1691, seniority backdated to 31 December 1688. Killed at the Battle of Steenkerque, August 1692;
- 1 August 1692: F.M. George Hamilton, 1st Earl of Orkney
- 27 June 1737: Gen. James St Clair

1st (Royal) Regiment of Foot (1751)

- 17 December 1762: Lt-Gen. Sir Henry Erskine, 5th Baronet
- 11 September 1765: F.M John Campbell, 5th Duke of Argyll
- 9 May 1782: Gen. Lord Adam Gordon
- 27 August 1801: F.M. Prince Edward, Duke of Kent and Strathearn

1st Regiment of Foot (Royal Scots) (1812)

- 29 January 1820: Gen. George Gordon, 5th Duke of Gordon
- 12 December 1834: Gen. Thomas Graham, 1st Baron Lynedoch
- 29 December 1843: Gen. Sir George Murray
- 7 August 1846: Gen. Sir James Kempt
- 12 December 1854: F.M. Sir Edward Blakeney
- 3 August 1868: Gen. Sir George Bell
- 11 July 1877: Gen. Henry Phipps Raymond

The Royal Scots (Lothian Regiment) (1881)

- 10 December 1897: Maj-Gen. Sir Edward Andrew Stuart, 3rd Baronet
- 20 August 1903: Lt-Gen. George Hay Moncrieff
- 16 October 1918: Lt-Gen. Sir Edward Altham Altham

The Royal Scots (The Royal Regiment) (1921)

- 26 March 1935: Maj-Gen. Granville George Loch
- 22 July 1940: Col. John Hugh Mackenzie
- 2 July 1946: Brig. Norman Richard Crockatt
- 1 January 1956: Maj-Gen. Sir Rohan Delacombe
- 1 October 1964: Maj-Gen. William Tait Campbell
- 1 January 1975: Lt-Gen. Sir David Tod Young
- 31 August 1980: Lt-Gen. Sir Robert Francis Richardson
- 31 August 1990: Brig. Charles David MacIver Ritchie
- 20 October 1995: Maj-Gen. Mark Jeremy Strudwick
- 25 July 2005–28 Mar 2006: Brig. Robert Logan Scott-Bowden
- 2006 Regiment amalgamated with The Royal Highland Fusiliers, The King's Own Scottish Borderers, The Black Watch, The Highlanders (Seaforth, Gordons and Camerons), and The Argyll and Sutherland Highlanders, to form The Royal Regiment of Scotland

== Victoria Cross ==
Victoria Crosses awarded to the regiment are:

- Private Robert Dunsire, First World War (26 September 1915)
- Captain Roland Edward Elcock, First World War (15 October 1918)
- Lieutenant David Stuart McGregor, First World War (22 October 1918)
- Private Hugh McIver, First World War (23 August 1918)
- Private Joseph Prosser, Crimean War (16 June 1855)
- Captain Henry Reynolds, First World War (20 September 1917)
- Private Henry Howey Robson, First World War (14 December 1914)

== Nicknames ==
The regiment is known by the nickname Pontius Pilate's Bodyguard which apparently was the result of a 17th-century boasting contest with the French Régiment de Picardie regarding the respective seniority of each regiment.

Picardie, the senior French infantry regiment, was formed in 1562, whereas the Scots had been raised in 1625 as Hepburn's Regiment and only entered French service in 1635 but, it is said, claimed a lineage from Scots in French service dating back to the C13th. Versions of this tradition vary but the story turns on the existence of either one regiment or the other dating back to service under Pontius Pilate at the time of Christ's crucifixion. The most common version tells of the name 'Pontius Pilate's Bodyguard' being tossed by the French as a jibe against the Scots. They replied that if their regiment had been on guard the night of the Crucifixion, the Sepulchre would not have been empty the next morning.

The 2nd Battalion was sardonically referred to as The First to Foot It during the Battle of Hong Kong.

== Football ==
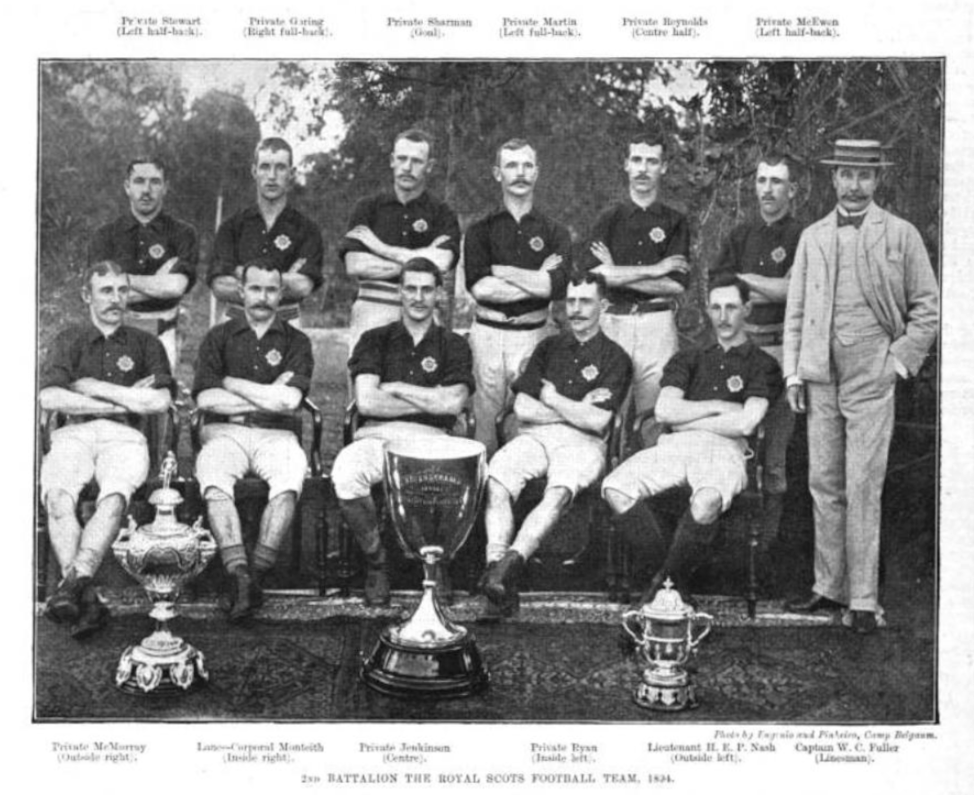
2nd Battalion football team, 1894

The football team of the 1st Battalion was a member of the Irish Football League for the 1899–1900 season, while deployed in Victoria Barracks, Belfast.

The 2nd Battalion team won several competitions in the 1890s, including the Surrey Cup, Malta Cup, Secunderabad Cup, Harris Cup, and Bombay Rovers Cup.

== Uniform ==
White facings on a red coat were worn until "royal blue" distinctions were adopted in the early 18th century. The Scottish thistle of St Andrew featured on belt-plates and other parts of the uniform. The standard red/scarlet and blue uniform of most line infantry regiments was retained until "Lowland" dress was adopted in 1881. For the Royal Scots this included a scarlet doublet, tartan trews and (from 1904) a dark blue Kilmarnock bonnet with diced band, scarlet toorie and black-cock feather. This continued as the regimental full dress uniform until 1939, although worn only to a limited extent after 1914. The No. 1 Dress worn during the final decades of the regiment's separate existence consisted of a dark blue bonnet with regimental dicing, dark blue doublet, and Hunting Stewart tartan trews.

== See also ==
- List of battalions of the Royal Scots

== Sources ==
- Baker, Chris. "The Royal Scots (Lothian Regiment) in 1914–1918". The British Army in the Great War.
- Brander, Michael (1976). Famous Regiments: The Royal Scots: The Royal Regiment. Leo Cooper. ISBN 9780850521832.
- Cannon, Richard (1846). Historical Record of the First, or Royal Regiment of Foot: Containing an Account of the Origin of the Regiment in the Reign of King James VI of Subsequent Services to 1846 (2012 ed.). Forgotten Books.
- Chappell, Brad. "Royal Scots (Lothian Regiment)". The Regimental Warpath 1914–1918. Archived from the original on 8 May 2016.
- Childs, John (2014). General Percy Kirke and the Later Stuart Army. Bloomsbury Academic. ISBN 978-1441158826.
- Childs, John (1984). "The British Brigade in France 1672-1678". History. 69 (227): 384–397. doi:10.1111/j.1468-229X.1984.tb01427.x. JSTOR 24419689.
- Ewing, John (1925). The Royal Scots, 1914–1919. Edinburgh: Oliver and Boyd. (Two volumes)
- Glozier, Matthew (2004). Scottish soldiers in France in the reign of the Sun King: nursery for men of honour. History of warfare. Vol. 24 (illustrated ed.). BRILL. ISBN 978-90-04-13865-0.
- Henn, Francis (2004). Business of Some Heat: The United Nations Force in Cyprus 1972-74. Casemate. ISBN 978-1844150816.
- Manning, Roger (2006). An Apprenticeship in Arms: The Origins of the British Army 1585-1702. OUP. ISBN 978-0199261499.
- McCance, Captain HM (1922). "Tangier 1680; the Diary of Sir James Halkett". Society for Army Historical Research. 1: 1–24. JSTOR 44221267.
- Mills, T.F. "The Royal Scots (The Royal Regiment)". regiments.org. Archived from the original on 12 July 2006. Includes chronological index of titles.
  - Mills, T.F. "1st Bn, The Royal Scots: Deployments". regiments.org. Archived from the original on 12 July 2006.
  - Mills, T.F. "2nd Bn, The Royal Scots: Deployments". regiments.org. Archived from the original on 12 July 2006.
  - Mills, T.F. "3rd Bn, The Royal Scots: Deployments". regiments.org. Archived from the original on 22 June 2006.
  - Mills, T.F. "4th Bn, The Royal Scots: Deployments". regiments.org. Archived from the original on 26 June 2006.
  - Mills, T.F. "British Territorials and Volunteers, an introductory overview". regiments.org. Archived from the original on 13 July 2006.
- Paterson, Robert H. (2000). Pontius Pilate's Bodyguard : a History of the First or the Royal Regiment of Foot. Edinburgh: The Royal Scots History Committee. ISBN 978-0-9540906-0-9. (Two volumes)
- Weaver, Lawrence (1925). The story of the Royal Scots (The Lothian Regiment). London: Country Life.
- The Scottish Military History Website. "The Royal Scots – Regulars, Militia and Rifle Volunteers Lineage". Lineage of the Scottish Regiments. Archived from the original on 29 September 2007.
- The Scottish Military History Website. "The King's Own Scottish Borderers – Regulars, Militia and Rifle Volunteers Lineage". Lineage of the Scottish Regiments. Archived from the original on 29 September 2007.
