= Sir Robert Douglas, 3rd Baronet =

Sir Robert Douglas, 3rd Baronet may refer to:

- Robert Douglas (New Zealand politician) (1837–1884)
- Sir Robert Douglas, 3rd Baronet (died 1692), Scottish soldier
