= Archibald Douglas, 2nd Earl of Forfar =

Scottish earl (1692–1715)

Arms of the House Douglas of Forfar

Archibald Douglas, 2nd Earl of Forfar, 3rd Earl of Ormond (25 May 1692 – 8 December 1715) was a Scottish peer.

He was the only son of Archibald Douglas, 1st Earl of Forfar, and Robina Lockhart, the daughter of Sir William Lockhart of Lee and Robina Sewster. He inherited the titles Earl of Forfar and Earl of Ormond at the age of 20 on 11 December 1712, upon the death of his father.

He was Colonel of the 3rd Regiment of Foot ("The Buffs") from 1713 until his death in 1715 and served as the Envoy to Prussia in 1714. He served on the Hanoverian side during the Jacobite rising of 1715 and led the 3rd Regiment at the Battle of Sheriffmuir (3 December 1715), where he was wounded in 17 places. He later died of his wounds in Stirling, Stirlingshire, Scotland, on 8 December 1715, at the age of 23. He was later buried in Bothwell Church on the family estates in Bothwell.

He died unmarried with neither issue nor heirs.

Military offices
| Preceded by John Selwyn | Colonel of Prince George of Denmark's Regiment; 1713–1715 | Succeeded by Sir Charles Wills |
Peerage of Scotland
| Preceded by Archibald Douglas | Earl of Forfar; 1712–1715 | Extinct |
| Preceded by Archibald Douglas | Earl of Ormond; 1712–1715 | Extinct |
