= Royal Scots F.C. =

Former association football club in Northern Ireland

- Full name: Royal Scots Football Club
- Founded: 1892
- Ground: none
- League: Irish Football League

The Royal Scots Football Club was a team of the 1st Battalion, Royal Scots, that was a member of the Irish Football League for the 1899-1900 season, while deployed in Palace Barracks. The club had reached the semi-finals of the Army Cup in its first season, 1892–93, while stationed in York, and won the competition in 1895–96, while stationed in Chatham. The regiment was stationed in Edinburgh before moving to Belfast in 1899. During its time it played friendly games against Burnley, Lincoln City, Sheffield United, Leicester Fosse, Tottenham Hotspur, Millwall Athletic, Luton Town, Swindon Town, Reading and played in the Edinburgh Shield.
