= Archibald Douglas, 1st Earl of Forfar =

Scottish earl

Archibald Douglas, 1st Earl of Forfar, 2nd Earl of Ormonde (3 May 1653 – 11 November 1712) was a Scottish peer.

Arms of the House Douglas of Forfar

He was the second son and youngest child of Archibald Douglas, Earl of Angus and 1st Earl of Ormond, by his second wife, Jean Wemyss, the daughter of David Wemyss, 2nd Earl of Wemyss and the Hon. Anna Balfour of Burleigh. He was also the younger half-brother of James Douglas, 2nd Marquess of Douglas and the younger brother of Lady Margaret Douglas, wife of Alexander Seton, 1st Viscount of Kingston.

He was made the Earl of Forfar and Lord of Wandell and Hartside on 2 October 1661 at the age of eight. He married Robina Lockhart (1662–1741), daughter of Sir William Lockhart of Lee and Robina Sewster, on 19 August 1679 at Lincoln's Inn Chapel, London, England.

His only son, Archibald Douglas, 2nd Earl of Forfar, was born in 1692.

He was a Privy Counsellor to both King William III and Queen Anne from 1689 until his death in 1712. He served as Commissioner of the Privy Seal from 1689 to 1690 and Commissioner for the Treasury from 1704 to 1705.

In 1700, he moved the family residence from Bothwell Castle to his new mansion, Bothwell House, which was dubbed "New Bothwell Castle".

He voted for the Act of Union in 1707, having allegedly received £100 in payment from the English.

He died on 11 November 1712 and was buried in Bothwell Church, Scotland.

Peerage of Scotland
Preceded by Archibald Douglas	Earl of Ormond; 1655–1712	Succeeded by Archibald Douglas
New creation	Earl of Forfar; 1661–1712	Succeeded by Archibald Douglas
Political offices
Preceded by The Earl of Atholl	Keeper of the Privy Seal of Scotland; 1689–1690	Succeeded by The Earl of Kintore
