= Sir Robert Douglas, 3rd Baronet (died 1692) =

Scottish soldier

Colonel Sir Robert Douglas of Glenbervie, 3rd Baronet (died 24 July 1692) was a Scottish soldier.

== Biography ==
Douglas was the only son and heir of Sir William Douglas, 2nd Baronet, and his wife Anne, and was grandson of the first baronet. On 3 May 1684 he became captain of a company in the Royal Regiment of Foot, and he was promoted to major of the regiment on 1 November that year, with his commission as major renewed on 10 February 1685 after the accession of King James II. He succeeded his father in the baronetcy before 11 January 1688, probably later in 1685. Douglas was promoted lieutenant-colonel of the Royal Regiment on 1 October 1688, but after the Glorious Revolution, he and Captain Robert Lauder may have been temporarily deprived of their commissions by King William III for refusing to recognise Marshal Schomberg as the regiment's new colonel in the room of Lord Dumbarton, who supported James. He was made colonel of the Royal Regiment on 9 March 1689, though effectively this appointment was only as lieutenant-colonel commanding as Schomberg still retained the chief command, and on 1 March 1690 had his seniority as colonel backdated to 31 December 1688. The Duke of Schomberg was killed at the Battle of the Boyne on 1 July 1690, and Douglas was confirmed in the vacant colonelcy of the regiment on 5 March 1691.

The regiment was stationed in the Low Countries at the time, and after failing to relieve the siege of Namur, Douglas was sent on 23 June 1692 with men of the Royal Regiment and other troops to attempt an attack on Mons. At one o'clock the following morning he and Colonel O'Farrell, who had mistaken their way in the dark while trying to reach the Prince of Württemberg, were captured by French cavalry. Douglas was ransomed and rejoined his regiment on 29 June, and was in command of the 1st Battalion at the Battle of Steenkerque. The night before the battle, Douglas's battalion was among the troops sent to take up a position closer to the French forces. The following morning they attacked through a valley crossed with hedges, each defended by opposing troops. Douglas led his regiment through the first three hedges, and in the fierce fighting around the fourth hedge, during which the superior force of French were driven from their guns, he became aware that one of the battalion's colours was in the possession of the enemy on the other side of the hedge. He leapt through a gap, killed the French officer holding the colour, and threw it back over the hedge to his own men. While attempting to return through the gap, he was shot dead by a French marksman. He was survived by his widow, Jane, who died in December 1735. They had no sons, and the baronetcy passed to his cousin Robert Douglas of Ardit, a grandson of the Rev. George Douglas, rector of Stepney, who was a younger brother of the first baronet. He was father of the genealogist Sir Robert Douglas, 6th Baronet.

Baronetage of Nova Scotia
Preceded by William Douglas	Baronet (of Glenbervie) c.1680–1692	Succeeded by Robert Douglas
