= George Douglas, 2nd Earl of Dumbarton =

Scottish nobleman and soldier

Lieutenant colonel George Douglas, 2nd Earl of Dumbarton (1687–1749) was a Scottish nobleman and soldier.

== Life ==
The Son of George Douglas, 1st Earl of Dumbarton and Anne Wheatley, Dumbarton was styled Lord Ettrick (more formally Lord Douglas of Ettrick), from birth until his father's death in 1692. Growing up at the court in exile of James VII and II, Dumbarton was initially attracted to live as a Religieux. But later Mary of Modena dissuaded him.

He was commissioned into Charles Duborgay's regiment of Foot, becoming a lieutenant colonel by 1715.

In 1716 he was given Letters of Credence to the Court of Peter I of Russia.

He died at Douai in 1748-1749 without issue.

Peerage of Scotland
Preceded by George Douglas	Earl of Dumbarton; 1692–1749	Extinct
