= George Douglas, 1st Earl of Dumbarton =

Scottish military officer

Major-General The Right Honourable The Earl of Dumbarton KT
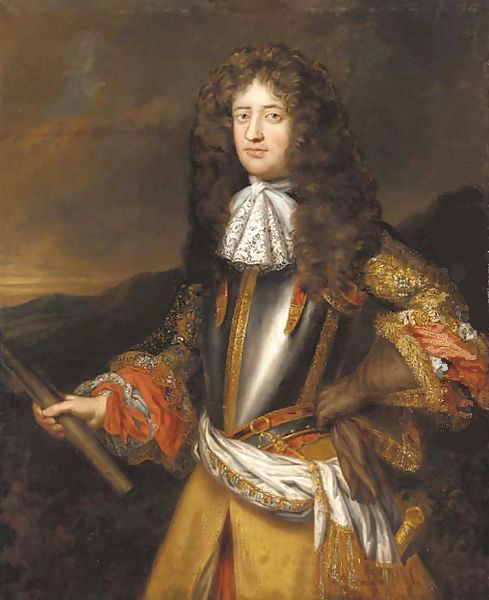
- Portrait by Henri Gascar
- Born: 1635; Douglas Castle
- Died: 20 March 1692 (aged 56–57); St Germain-en-Laye, Paris, France
- Burial place: Abbey of Saint-Germain-des-Prés
- Military career
- Allegiance: Kingdom of France 1648–1679; Kingdom of England 1679–1688
- Branch: Infantry
- Service years: 1653 – 1688
- Rank: Major-General; Maréchal de camp
- Units: Régiment de Douglas or Dumbartons, later the Royal Scots
- Commands: Commander in Chief, Scotland May to 1686
- Conflicts: Fronde 1648–1653; Franco-Spanish War 1653–1659; Third Anglo-Dutch War 1672–1674; Franco-Dutch War 1674–1678; Argyll's Rising June 1685
- Awards: Knight of the Order of the Thistle

Major-General George Douglas, 1st Earl of Dumbarton, KT (1635 – 20 March 1692) was a Scottish military officer who spent much of his career in the service of King Louis XIV. In 1678, he returned to England; as a Catholic, he was a trusted servant of King James II and went into exile with him after the 1688 Glorious Revolution. He died at the palace of St Germain-en-Laye in March, 1692.

== Life ==
George Douglas, later the Earl of Dumbarton, was born in 1635, probably at Douglas Castle in Lanarkshire, one of 13 children of the Marquess of Douglas (ca 1589–1660) and his second wife, Lady Mary Gordon (ca 1600–1674). His elder brother was William Douglas, later Duke of Hamilton, while half-brothers from the Marquess' first marriage included Lord James Douglas and Archibald Douglas, Earl of Angus.

By the 1630s, the vast majority of Scots belonged to the Protestant Church of Scotland or kirk; Catholicism was confined to parts of the aristocracy, such as the Marquess and Lady Mary, and remote Gaelic-speaking areas of the Highlands. The Covenanter government that ruled Scotland during the 1638-1651 Wars of the Three Kingdoms ordered the Douglas children to be brought up as Protestants; to escape this, George was sent to France and he first appears in a safe conduct pass dated 1647 giving him permission to do so.

George and most of his immediate family remained Catholic, but his half-brother the Earl of Angus became a Protestant; his elder brother William did the same in order to marry the rich and Presbyterian Anne Hamilton.

He married Anne, daughter of George Wheatley and sister-in-law of the Duke of Northumberland. They had one surviving son, George Douglas, 2nd Earl of Dumbarton (1687-1749).

== Career ==
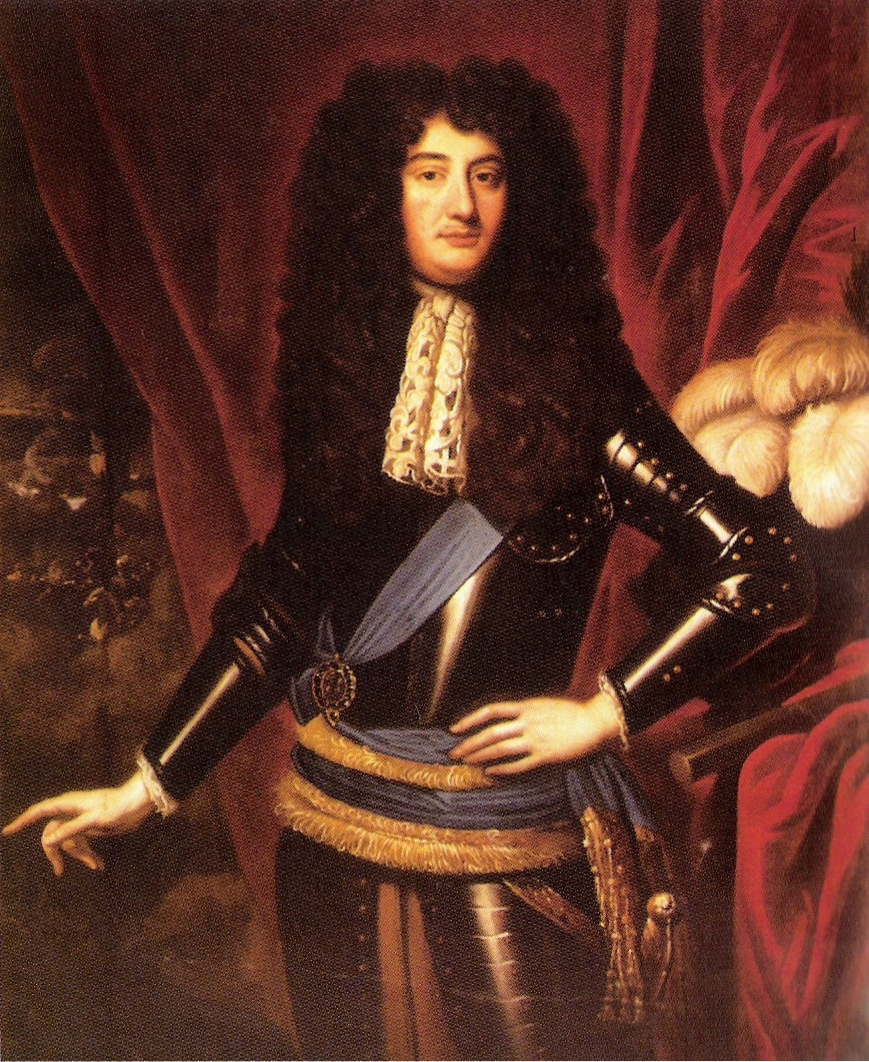
William Douglas, Duke of Hamilton (1634-1694); Dumbarton's elder brother

During the Interregnum of 1649–1660 that followed the execution of Charles I in January 1649, many Royalists lived in exile and joined units in foreign service, like the Dutch Scots Brigade. Such formations were common to all armies, with loyalties often based on religion or personal relationships; Marshall Turenne (1611-1675), considered the greatest general of his time, was a French Protestant who served in the Dutch army from 1625 to 1635.

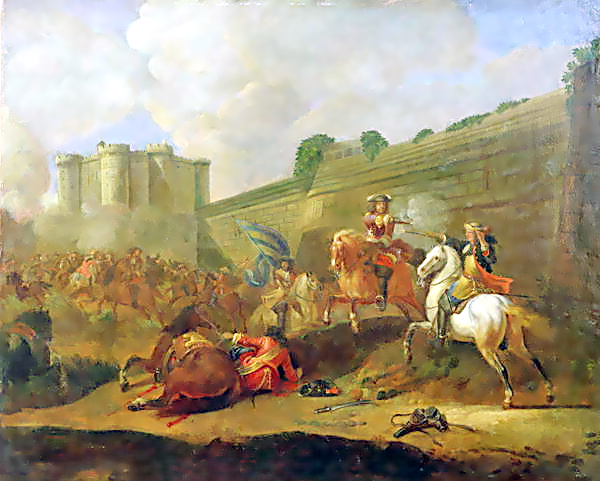
Battle of the Faubourg St Antoine, 1652; Dumbarton's regiment was part of the Royal Army that won this victory

The Régiment de Douglas was one such unit; formed in 1633 and recruited in Scotland, it had served with the French army ever since. In this period, regiments were the personal property of their Colonel and valuable financial assets; in 1645, ownership passed to the Earl of Angus, who remained in Scotland and assigned the Colonelcy to Dumbarton in 1653.

The complex politics of this period meant individuals like Dumbarton needed both political and military skills; during the 1648-1653 Fronde or Civil War in France, as a foreign, Catholic-officered unit, his regiment was one of the few the young Louis XIV could rely on. However, in the latter stages of the 1635-1659 Franco-Spanish War, France allied with the English Commonwealth against Spain. Many exiled Royalists in France, including the future James II, now changed sides and the regiment was assigned to garrison duty to prevent its defection.

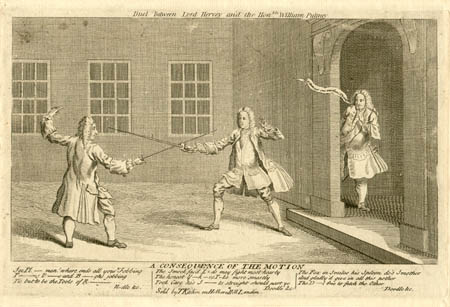
The duel; a common practice of the period, Dumbarton was so badly injured in one that his death was reported in October 1669

In 1660, Charles II was restored as King of Scotland and England, leading to an attempted coup in January 1661 by Puritan radicals. Dumbarton's troops were sent to England but the revolt was quickly crushed and they returned to France, since the Cavalier Parliament refused to finance replacements for the disbanded New Model Army; this would be an issue throughout Charles' reign.

Dumbarton stayed in France until 1678, apart from a short period during the 1664-67 Second Anglo-Dutch War when his unit was based at Chatham dockyard. The diarist Samuel Pepys met him in Rochester and recorded that "Here in the streets, I did hear the Scotch march beat by the drums before the soldiers, which is very odde." In 1667, the regiment was accused of looting after the Medway Raid and ordered back to France; while awaiting transport, over 700 of the 1,500 men deserted. In October 1669, Dumbarton was so badly wounded in a duel his death was reported in the newspapers.

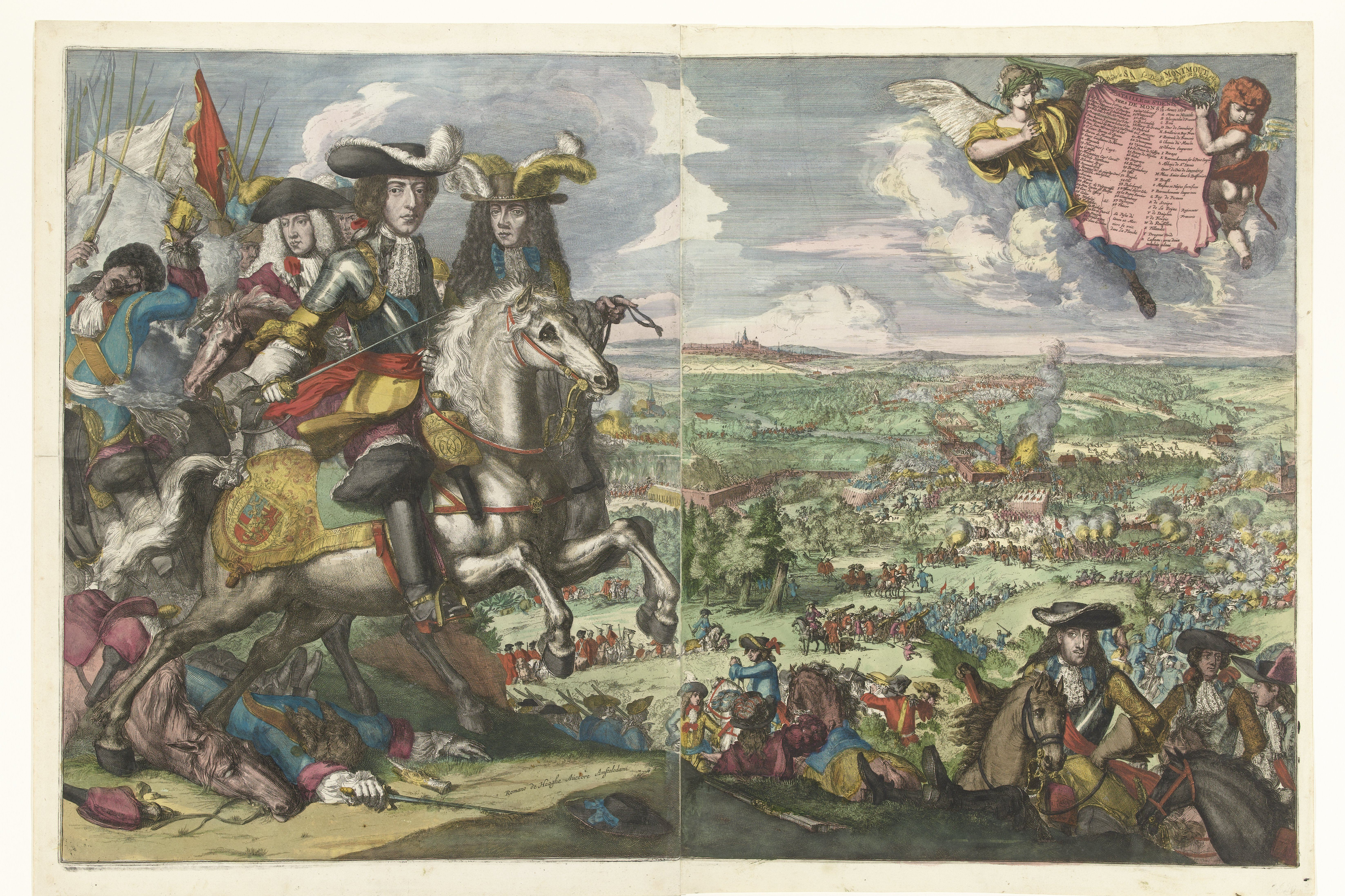
The 1678 Battle of Saint-Denis which ended the Franco-Dutch War and Dumbarton's employment by Louis XIV

Under the 1670 Treaty of Dover, England agreed an alliance with France against the Dutch Republic, including the supply of 6,000 troops for the French army. It also contained secret provisions which were not revealed until 1771, including the payment to Charles of £230,000 per year for these troops. The Brigade fought primarily in the Rhineland, to avoid potential clashes with English and Scots serving with the Dutch; a large part of it was provided by Dumbarton, whose regiment was expanded to 33 companies or 3,432 men.

However, the alliance with Catholic France was deeply unpopular and England withdrew from the war after the 1674 Treaty of Westminster. Anxious to keep his French subsidies, Charles encouraged Dumbarton and other members of the Brigade to remain in French service during the 1672-1678 Franco-Dutch War. Charles created him Earl of Dumbarton and Lord of Ettrick in 1675 but neither came with estates and Dumbarton complained they simply cost him large amounts of money; in 1677, Louis appointed him Maréchal de camp or Lieutenant General in the French Army.

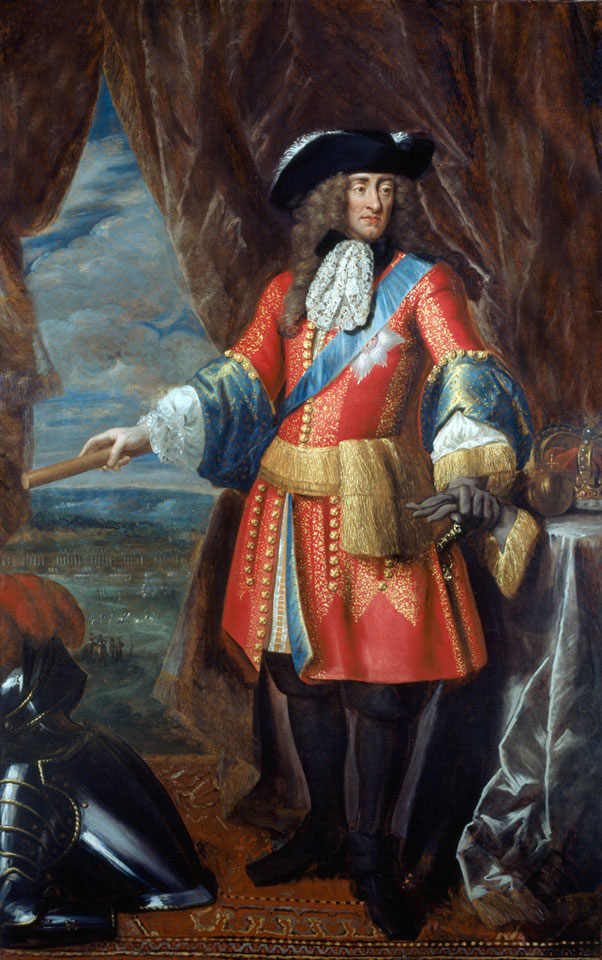
James, ca 1685 as head of the army, wearing a general officer's state coat

In 1678, concerns over the Catholic James succeeding Charles resulted in the Popish Plot, in which over 100 people were falsely accused of conspiracy to murder Charles; 22 were executed and this was followed by the 1678-1681 Exclusion Crisis. At the same time, the end of the Franco-Dutch War led to Dumbarton's regiment being discharged from the French army in June 1678; in January 1679, it was reformed and listed on the English military establishment as the 'First Foot.' This was a temporary response to the unsettled political climate and to reduce Parliamentary scrutiny, the regiment was sent to Ireland in 1680, part of it also joining the Tangier Garrison.

As a Catholic military professional and long-time servant of Louis XIV, Dumbarton was viewed with great suspicion by the Whigs; he petitioned Charles for compensation for financial losses arising from the 1678 Test Act, which barred him from Colonelcy of his regiment. In reality, nothing changed; the regiment was referred to as 'late Dumbartons' but the Colonelcy left unfilled and he was restored as Colonel in 1685.

Lacking a standing army, mercenary units like Dumbartons were a means of creating a pool of trained English and Scottish professionals; the most significant of these was the Dutch Scots Brigade, a mixture of English and Scottish regiments serving William of Orange. While Charles theoretically controlled the appointment of officers, in reality it required negotiation and attempts to appoint Dumbarton as Brigade commander in 1680 were rejected by William.

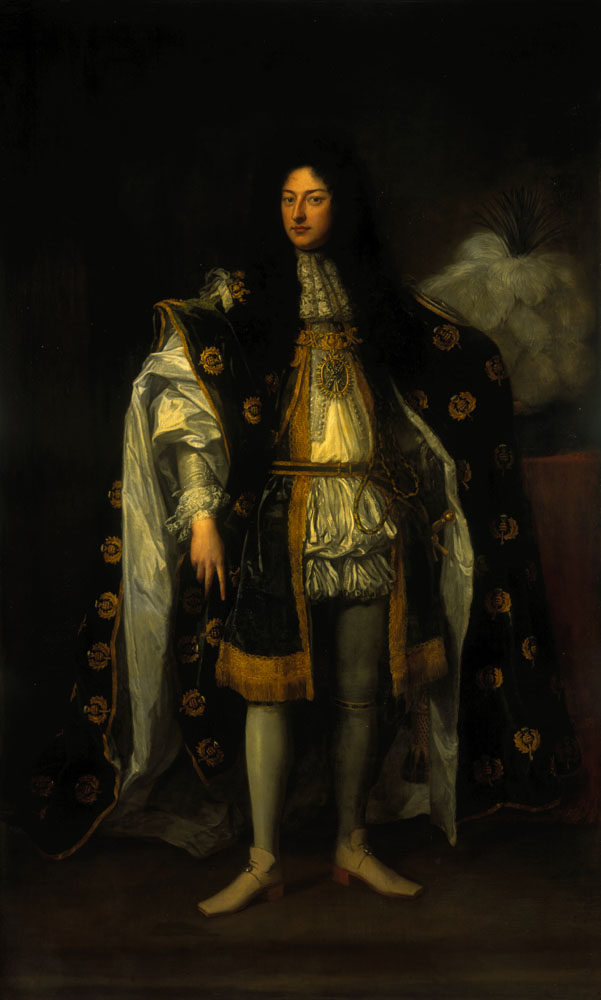
Earl of Melfort, leader of the Scottish Court Party, which included Dumbarton

James was sent to Edinburgh in 1681 as Lord High Commissioner to the Parliament of Scotland; over the next two years, he established a Scottish Court Party, a mixture of Catholics like the Earl of Melfort and Dumbarton, plus supportive Protestants such as his brother, the Duke of Hamilton. In August 1681, the Scottish Parliament passed the Succession Act, which confirmed the divine right of kings, the rights of the natural heir 'regardless of religion,' the duty of all to swear allegiance to that king and the independence of the Scottish Crown. However, tolerance for personal Catholicism did not extend to Catholicism in general; the 1681 Scottish Test Act also required all public officials and MPs to swear unconditional loyalty to the King but with the crucial qualifier they 'promise to uphold the true Protestant religion.'

In 1683, rumours spread that Dumbarton was about to replace the Protestant Tam Dalyell as Commander of Chief in Scotland, which may explain why he was asked to lead a diplomatic mission to France in July. In 1684, Charles paid him £1,500 in compensation for losses incurred as a result of his Catholicism.

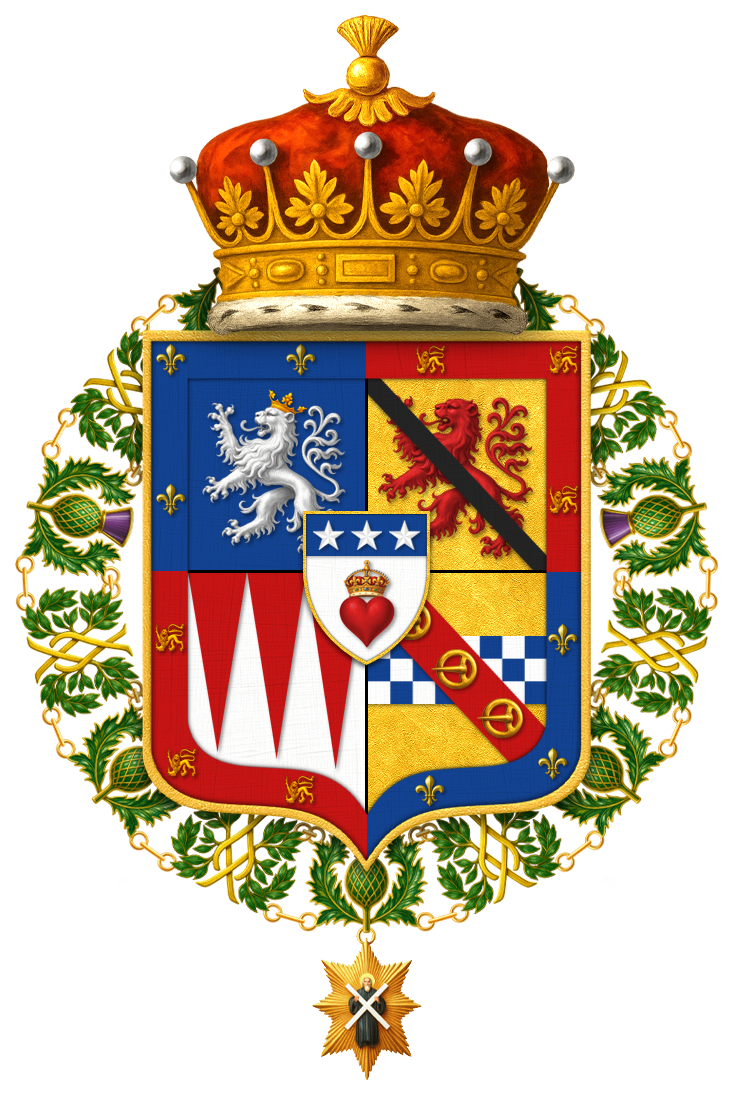
Shield of Arms of George Douglas, 1st Earl of Dumbarton, surmounting the collar of the Order of the Thistle

James became king in February 1685 and in June, Dumbarton helped put down Argyll's Rising; he served briefly as Commander-in-Chief, Scotland but was replaced in October by the Presbyterian William Drummond, Viscount Strathallan. However, in return for his support, he received the forfeited estates of Andrew Fletcher of Saltoun; in 1687, he was a founder member of the Order of the Thistle, along with his nephew the Earl of Arran.

After James was deposed in the November 1688 Glorious Revolution, Dumbarton accompanied him into exile in France. Dumbarton landed at Calais on 20 January 1689 with Henry Jermyn, 1st Baron Dover. The exiled king paid him a pension of 166 livres. He died at St Germain-en-Laye in March 1692 and was buried at the Abbey of Saint-Germain-des-Prés, amongst other members of his family.

== See also ==
- Dumbarton's Drums

== Sources ==
- Balfour, Paul; The Scots Peerage, Volume III;
- Cannon, Richard; Historical Record of the First, or Royal Regiment of Foot: Containing an Account of the Origin of the Regiment in the Reign of King James VI of Subsequent Services to 1846; (2016 ed.);
- Childs, John; General Percy Kirke and the Later Stuart Army; (Bloomsbury Academic, 2014);
- Dalton, Charles; The Scots Army 1661-1688; (Eyre & Spottiswoode, 1909);
- Davenport, Frances; European Treaties bearing on the History of the United States and its Dependencies; (1917)
- Glozier, Matthew; Scottish Soldiers in France in the Reign of the Sun King: Nursery for Men of Honour; (Brill, 2004);
- Harris, Tim; Scott [formerly Crofts], James, duke of Monmouth and first Duke of Buccleuch (1649–1685); (Oxford DNB);
- Harris, Tim, Taylor, Stephen, eds; The Final Crisis of the Stuart Monarchy; (Boydell & Brewer, 2015);
- Jackson, Clare; Restoration Scotland, 1660-1690: Royalist Politics, Religion and Ideas; (Boydell Press, 2003);
- Lynn, John; The Wars of Louis XIV, 1667-1714 (Modern Wars in Perspective); (Longman, 1996);

Peerage of Scotland
New creation	Earl of Dumbarton; 1675–1692	Succeeded by George Douglas
