= William Douglas, 1st Marquess of Douglas =

17th-century Scottish noble

William Douglas
- Marquess of Douglas
- Predecessor: new creation
- Successor: James Douglas, 2nd Marquess of Douglas
- Other titles: Earl of Angus; Lord Abernethy; Lord Bonkyll & Preston; Lord Jedburgh Forest
- Born: 1589
- Died: 19 February 1660 (aged 70–71); Douglas Castle
- Buried: St Bride's kirk, Douglas, South Lanarkshire
- Noble family: Douglas
- Spouses: Margaret Hamilton; Lady Mary Gordon
- Issue: List: Archibald Douglas, 1st Earl of Ormond; Lord William Douglas; Lord James Douglas; William Douglas, 1st Earl of Selkirk; George Douglas, 1st Earl of Dumbarton; Lord James Douglas; Lady Margaret Alexander; Jean Hamilton, Lady Bargany; Lady Grizel Carmichael; Lady Anna Douglas; Henrietta Johnstone, Countess of Annandale; Lady Catherine Ruthven; Isabel Douglas, Duchess of Queensberry; Jane Drummond, Countess of Perth; Lucy Maxwell, Countess of Nithsdale; Lady Mary Douglas
- Father: William Douglas, 10th Earl of Angus
- Mother: Lady Elizabeth Oliphant

William Douglas, 1st Marquess of Douglas and 11th Earl of Angus (1589–1660) was a Scottish nobleman.

== Life ==
=== Master of Angus ===
William Douglas was the eldest son of William Douglas, 10th Earl of Angus and his wife, Elizabeth Oliphant, eldest daughter of Laurence Oliphant, 4th Lord Oliphant. His younger brothers were James Douglas, 1st Lord Mordington and Sir Francis Douglas of Sandilands.

Shortly before Douglas was born, his grandfather inherited the earldom of Angus and Lordship of Douglas from a distant cousin; in 1591, his father in turn succeeded to the titles as 10th Earl, and the boy adopted the style of "Master of Angus" or "Lord Douglas".

The 10th Earl was a notable convert from state-sanctioned Presbyterianism to Catholicism, and the family were not trusted by the Kirk due to his religious position. The prestigious public duties he had inherited, holding the first seat and vote in the King's Council and parliament, leading the vanguard of the Scots army, and bearing the Crown of Scotland, also brought him into conflict with the Duke of Lennox, who had been granted a conflicting precedence and ceremonial role. The scandal of the Spanish Blanks in 1593–1595 made Angus a rebel, and although he eventually recovered his position, and succeeded in defending his inheritance, he chose to go into exile in Paris in 1608 to obtain freedom of conscience.

All this had an effect on Douglas' childhood; he was separated from his father during the Earl's periods of house arrest, and in 1596 the Douglas inheritance was briefly conferred on him in his father's place. The next year, when his father was restored to favour, the Master of Angus sent away to live with his Protestant cousin and godfather, the Earl of Morton, though he soon returned home after breaking his leg in an accident. In 1601, at the very young age of twelve, the Master of Angus was married to Margaret Hamilton, daughter of Claud Hamilton, 1st Lord Paisley – a match that was designed as a Catholic alliance, and also gained the protection of the bride's powerful kinsman, Lord Fyvie.

=== Earl of Angus ===
Douglas succeeded his father as Earl of Angus in 1611; his father had made arrangements to ensure that his inheritance was largely free of the debts that had previously burdened it. However, he was immediately embroiled in legal dispute with his tenants the Kers of Ferniehirst over rights to hold courts in the Bailiary of Jedforest. This dispute resulted in a severe outbreak of violence in the Borders, and the case was presented to the Privy Council. The Lords of Session found in favour of Angus, although his brother James was remanded at Blackness Castle for threatening one of the Kers. Angus maintained his right to hold courts, and the Kers had to post £10,000 Scots as security to keep the peace.

Not of a healthy constitution and unhappy with the religious climate at home, Angus was given leave by James VI of Scotland, to travel to Europe, which he did in 1616, returning by 1620; and again in 1623, he was given an 11-year leave of absence to travel to the continent, leaving his estates to be run by his brother Lord Mordington, and his cousin William Douglas, 7th Earl of Morton. Whilst in France, he corresponded with Marc Antonio Scoto d'Agazzano and Italian nobleman from Piacenza, who claimed ancient kinship with Angus (cf. The legend of Sholto Douglas).

Angus did not stay on the continent for the full 11 years, but returned to Britain following the death of King James in 1625. The new king, Charles I, stopped charges of Papistry levelled against the Earl and restored to him his father's honours in 1631. Douglas married again, following the death of his first wife, to Mary Gordon, daughter of George Gordon, 1st Marquess of Huntly. During the King's visit to Scotland for his coronation in that realm in 1633, Angus was created Marquess of Douglas, Earl of Angus, Lord of Abernethy and Jedburgh Forest at Dalkeith. He bore the crown during the coronation.

=== Marquess of Douglas ===
Until 1638 Douglas spent the most part of his time at Douglas Castle, not much intervening in national affairs, apart from being appointed a King's commissioner to deal with an outbreak of violence along the Marches.

In 1644, Douglas signed the National Covenant at Douglas Kirk, but by 1645 he had switched sides to join James Graham, 1st Marquess of Montrose, following the Battle of Kilsyth. Montrose made him his lieutenant for Clydesdale, and Douglas raised his countryside to join with Montrose's army just before his great defeat at the Battle of Philiphaugh. Douglas was able to escape following the debacle, but was captured in April the following year, and imprisoned in Edinburgh Castle. For the first months of his captivity he was allowed to be accompanied by his Marchioness, but by July 1646, he was being held under close ward. He was released in 1647 following the payment of a large fine. In 1651, Charles II offered Douglas the leadership of a regiment in the army he was raising to invade England, Douglas declined however. Following Cromwell's Act of Grace, Douglas was further forced to pay of the huge fine of £1000 sterling for himself, and a further £1000 each for his two sons, Archibald, Lord Douglas and William, 1st Earl of Selkirk.It is possible that in light of this that Douglas' fine was reduced to £333.

=== Death ===
Douglas died at Douglas Castle, on 19 February 1660 and was buried in front of the altar of St. Brides's Kirk, Douglas, South Lanarkshire. The Marquess of Douglas was succeeded by his grandson, James Douglas, 2nd Marquess of Douglas.

... William, eleventh earl of Angus and first marquess of Douglas, like his father, was a Roman Catholic, and a faithful adherent of the king during the civil wars. He maintained to its fullest extent the old princely hospitality and grandeur of the family at Douglas castle, where he chiefly resided. The king constituted him his lieutenant on the borders, and created him Marquess of Douglas, 17th June 1638. He joined the Marquess of Montrose after his victory at Kilsyth in August 1645, escaped from the rout at the battle of Philiphaugh, 13th September of that year, and soon after made terms with the ruling powers. He was fined one thousand pounds sterling by Cromwell’s act of grace and pardon. He died 19th February 1660. He was twice married; first to the Hon. Margaret Hamilton, only daughter of Claud Lord Paisley, sister of James, first earl of Abercorn, and secondly to Lady Mary Gordon, third daughter of George Gordon, 1st Marquess of Huntly.

== Marriage and issue ==
Douglas was twice married. He was married firstly in 1601, to Margaret Hamilton, daughter of Claude Hamilton, 1st Lord Paisley who died in 1621. In 1632, he married secondly to Lady Mary Gordon, daughter to George Gordon, 1st Marquess of Huntly:

By Margaret Hamilton, Douglas had six children:

- Archibald Douglas, Earl of Angus (1609–1655)
- Lord William Douglas (d.1633)
- Lord James Douglas (1617–1645)
- Lady Grizel Douglas, married Sir William Carmichael of that Ilk
- Lady Jean Douglas, married John Hamilton, 1st Lord Bargany
- Lady Lucy Douglas, married Robert Maxwell, 4th Earl of Nithsdale

By Lady Mary Gordon, Douglas had ten children:

- William Douglas, 1st Earl of Selkirk (1634–1694)
- George Douglas, 1st Earl of Dumbarton (1635–1692)
- Lord James Douglas
- Lady Margaret Douglas, married William, Lord Alexander, eldest son of William Alexander, 1st Earl of Stirling
- Lady Anna Douglas, died unmarried
- Lady Henrietta Douglas, married James Johnstone, 1st Earl of Annandale
- Lady Catherine Douglas, married Sir William Ruthven of Dunglas. Their daughter, Barbara, married Sir Hugh Paterson, 1st Baronet.
- Lady Isabel Douglas (1642–1691), married William Douglas, 1st Duke of Queensberry
- Lady Jane Douglas, married James Drummond, 4th Earl of Perth
- Lady Mary Douglas, died unmarried

== Notes ==
Peerage of Scotland
New creation	Marquess of Douglas; 1638 – 1660	Succeeded by James Douglas
Preceded by William Douglas	Earl of Angus; 1611 – 1660	Succeeded by James Douglas
