= 8th Battalion, Royal Scots (The Royal Regiment) =

The 8th Battalion, Royal Scots (The Royal Regiment) was a Territorial Army battalion of the Royal Scots (The Royal Regiment), the oldest and most senior infantry regiment of the British Army. Formed as a 2nd-line duplicate of the 7th/9th Battalion on 2 August 1939, it remained in the United Kingdom as part of 44th (Lowland) Infantry Brigade, alongside the 6th Royal Scots Fusiliers and 6th King's Own Scottish Borderers. The brigade was a part of the 15th (Scottish) Infantry Division, which would gain an excellent reputation in the campaign, and itself was formed a 2nd Line duplicate of the 1st Line 52nd Division. In June 1944, they landed in Normandy as part of Operation Overlord and fought in the Battle for Caen in Operation Epsom and later at the Second Battle of the Odon and Operation Bluecoat. It then fought in the North West Europe Campaign, from Paris to the Rhine, until the end of the war; it entered Belgium in September, crossed the Rhine in March 1945 and advanced to Hamburg by the end of the war.
