= Archibald Douglas, 1st Earl of Ormond =

Scottish earl (1609–1655)

Member of the Privy Council of Scotland
- In office May 1636 – ?

Personal details
- Born: 1609
- Died: 15 January 1655 (aged 45–46)
- Spouse(s): Anne Stuart (m. 1628; died 1646) Jane Wemyss
- Children: 3, including James and Archibald
- Parent: William Douglas (father)
- Relatives: Claud Hamilton (grandfather); James Douglas (brother); George Douglas (brother)

Archibald Douglas, Earl of Angus, 1st Earl of Ormond (1609–15 January 1655) was the eldest son of William Douglas, 1st Marquis of Douglas, from whom he obtained the courtesy title of Earl of Angus. (Note: Vian in the DNB spells the title Earl of Ormonde. Lee in the DNBIE and Paton in the much more recent ODNB, spell the name Earl of Ormond.) Douglas was a member of the privy council of Scotland from 1636; vacillated in his opinions on the new service-book, originally (1636) approving its use. He was appointed an extraordinary lord of session in 1631. He signed the covenant, was unwilling to take up arms in its defence, but was a commissioner for the covenanters in England in 1643. In 1646 he was made colonel of Régiment de Douglas in France when his brother Lord James Douglas, was killed in action. He was a member of the committee of estates in 1650.

He was created Earl of Ormond in 1651; and fined £1,000 by Cromwell's Act of Grace, 1654.

== Biography ==
Douglas was the eldest son of William Douglas, 11th Earl of Angus and 1st Marquis of Douglas, by his first wife, Margaret Hamilton, daughter of Claud Hamilton, 1st Lord Paisley, was born in 1609. In a charter of the barony of Hartside or Wandell, granted to him and his father 15 June 1613, he is named Lord Douglas, Master of Angus, and it is by the title of Earl of Angus, which became his on his father's elevation to the marquisate, that he is generally known. In 1628 Angus married Lady Anne Stuart, second daughter of Esmé Stewart, 3rd Duke of Lennox, Charles I being a party to the marriage contract.

In 1630 Angus went abroad and did not return before the latter end of 1633. In May 1636 he was appointed a member of the Privy Council of Scotland, and was present at the meeting in December of that year at which the use of the new service-book was sanctioned. His sympathies, however, were believed to lie with the Covenanters, for when the Duke of Lennox was sent to enforce the use of the service-book, Angus was chosen to treat with him. Yet when the royal proclamation was issued commanding the use of the book, the order was made with the approval of Angus. On the final suppression of the book he was one of those members of the privy council who addressed a letter of thanks to the king. Judged by his vacillation in this matter Angus would seem to have had a large share of that spirit of irresolution which was the chief characteristic of the political careers of his half-brother and nephew and the third and fourth dukes of Hamilton. Angus was appointed an extraordinary lord of session 9 February 1631, and not long afterwards signed the covenant. But when the Covenanters prepared to take the field, he left the country.

Angus returned to Scotland in 1641, when he appeared in parliament, and his right to sit as a peer's eldest son being questioned and decided against him, he was turned out, together with some others of the same rank. At the general assembly summoned in August 1643 he was elected one of the commissioners appointed to further the cause of the covenant in England, and at the same time he was put on the special commission which was to meet the commissioners sent to treat with the assembly by the English Long Parliament. In 1646, on the death of his younger brother, Lord James Douglas, in action, he was appointed to the command held by him as colonel of the Régiment de Douglas in France. He held this post till 1653, when he resigned it in favour of his brother George Douglas, 1st Earl of Dumbarton, but it does not appear that he saw any active service. The greater portion of these years he spent at home in Scotland, though he took no prominent part in public affairs till the arrival of Charles II in Scotland.

With the arrival of Charles II in 1650, he became a member of the committee of estates, and was among those appointed to make preparations for the king's coronation. At that ceremony he officiated as high chamberlain, and in the following April he was created Earl of Ormond in the Peerage of Scotland, (the subsidiary title of this earldom was Lord Bothwell and Hartside), with remainder to the heirs male of his second marriage with Lady Jane Wemyss, eldest daughter of David, 2nd Earl of Wemyss, his first wife having died 16 August 1646, in her thirty-second year.

At the assembly which met at Edinburgh, and afterwards at Dundee, in July 1651, the earl took a leading part in the opposition to the Western Remonstrance; but after the departure of Charles II to the continent he retired into private life. He was fined £1,000 by Cromwell's act of grace in 1654, though it was stoutly alleged on his behalf by the presbytery that he was a true Protestant. He resided in the Canongate or at Holyrood Palace till his death, which took place 15 January 1655, in the lifetime of his father. He was buried at Douglas in the family vault in St. Bride's Church.

== Marriages and issue ==
By Lady Anne Stuart Ormond had one son:

- James Douglas, 2nd Marquess of Douglas (c.1646–1700), who succeeded his grandfather as Marquess of Douglas.

His second wife was Lady Jane Wemyss (1629-1715), a daughter of David Wemyss, 2nd Earl of Wemyss and Anna Balfour (died 1649). They had a daughter and two sons, including:

- Lady Margaret Douglas (1651-1699) who became the fourth wife of Alexander Seton, 1st Viscount of Kingston
- Archibald, succeeded him in his title, and in 1661 obtained a new patent creating him Earl of Forfar.

His widow, Jane Wemyss, outlived him sixty years. In 1659 she married George Gordon, 15th Earl of Sutherland, whom she also survived. (Note: Paton ODNB, states it was "George, fifteenth Earl of Sutherland", Vian DNB stated it was "George, fourteenth Earl of Sutherland", but the fourteenth Earl's first name was John.)

== Notes ==
Footnotes

Citations

Peerage of Scotland
New creation	Earl of Ormond; 1651–1655	Succeeded by Archibald Douglas
