= Lord James Douglas =

Scottish nobleman and soldier (1617-1645)

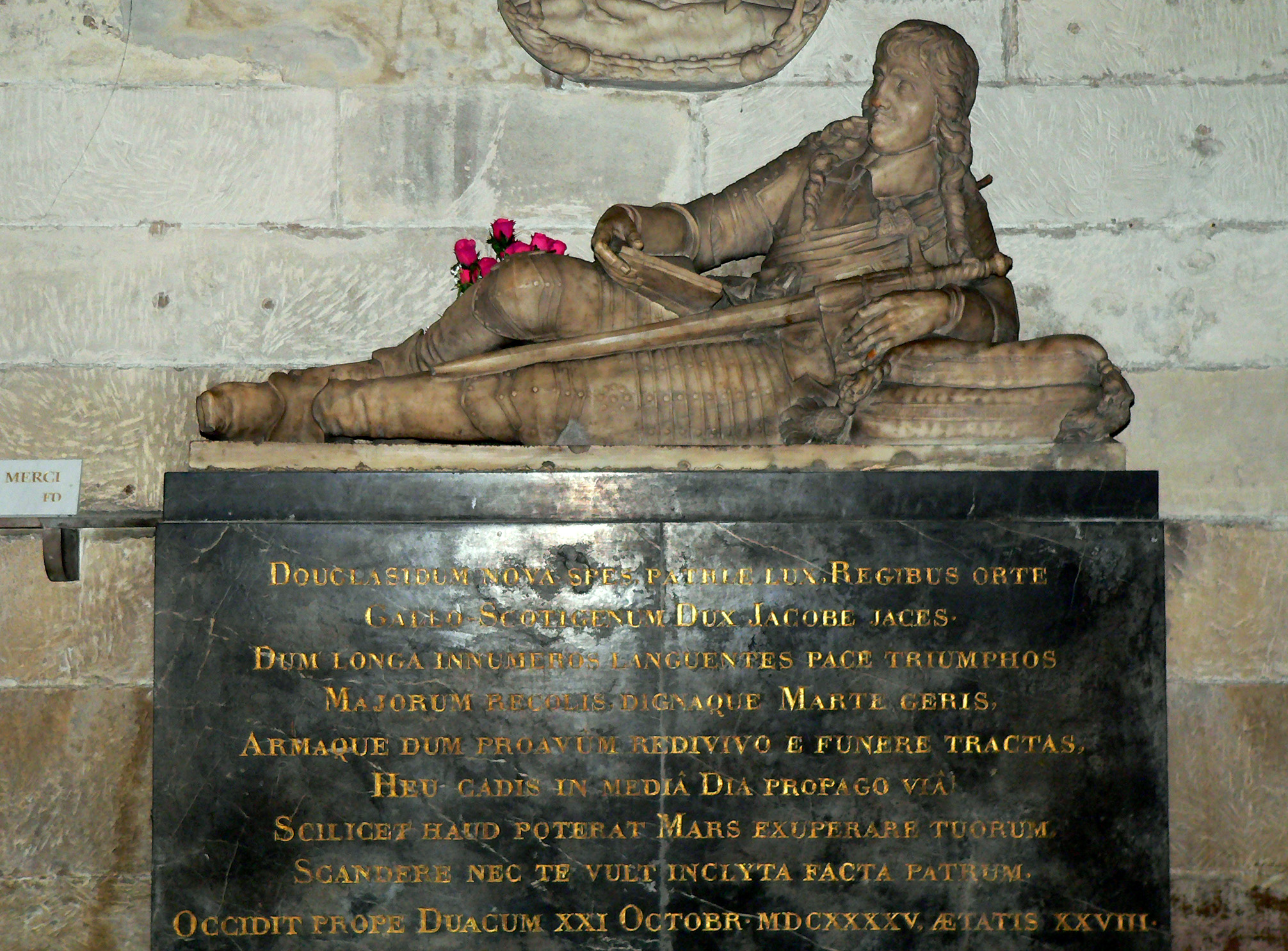
Tomb of Lord James Douglas, Abbey of Saint-Germain-des-Prés

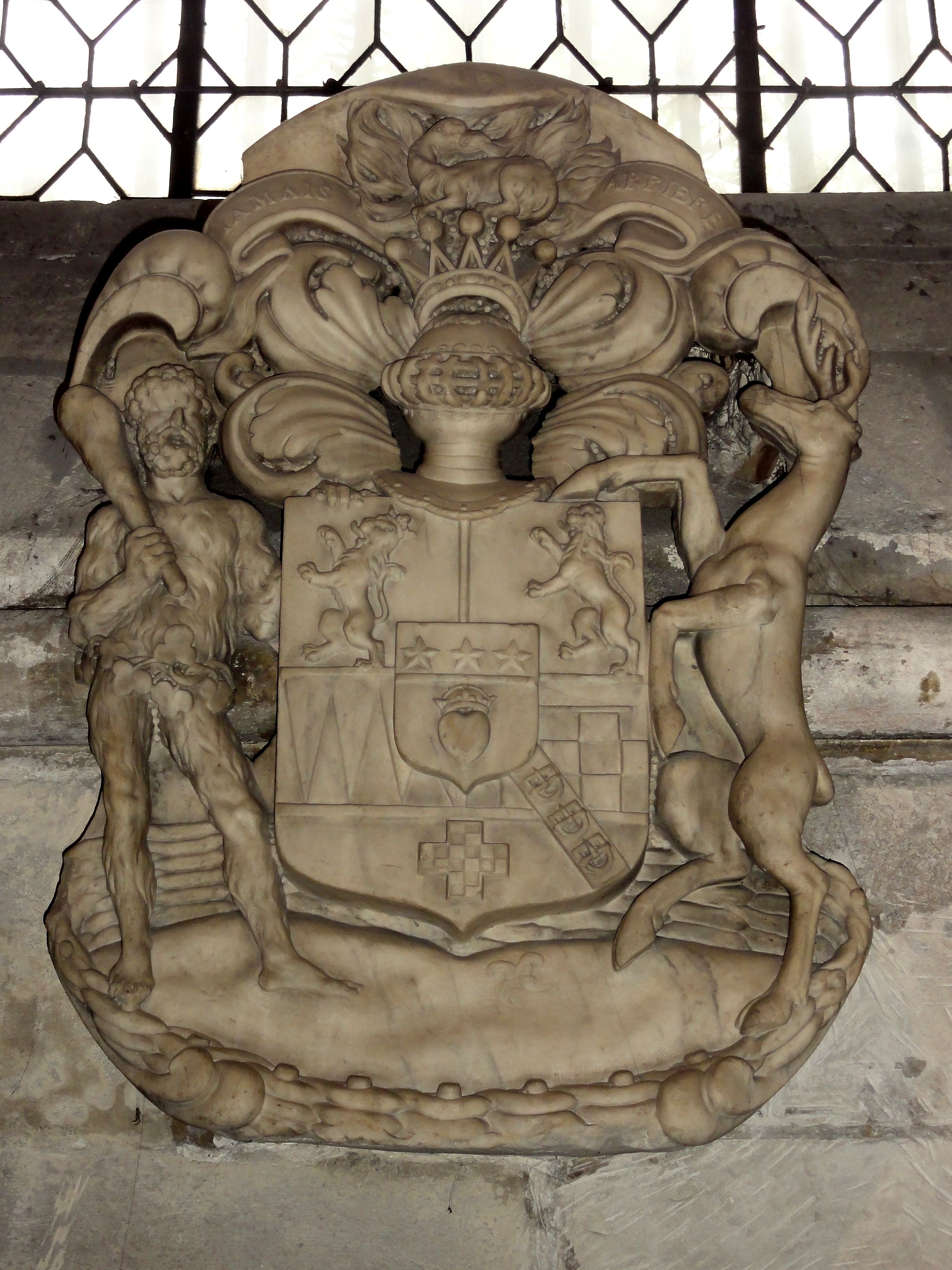
Coat of arms of James Douglas, Abbey of Saint-Germain-des-Prés

Lord James Douglas (1617–1645) was a Scottish nobleman and soldier.

He was born at Douglas Castle, Douglas, South Lanarkshire, the son of William Douglas, 1st Marquess of Douglas, and his wife Margaret Hamilton, a daughter of Claud Hamilton, 1st Lord Paisley.

Douglas was sent at an early age to the court of Louis XIII, where he was served the King as a Page, where he steadily moved through the levels of the Maison du Roi.

== Thirty Years War ==
At the age of twenty, he was appointed colonel of the Scots Regiment (one of five Scottish units in French service in this period), the first of three brothers to do so.

The Scots Regiment was raised, as its name suggests, in Scotland in 1625, and had fought in Sweden in the early part of the Thirty Years' War, it returned to Scotland as the Royal regiment of Foot in 1633. In 1635, the regiment was bound to King Louis, "in all service except against the King of Great Britain". Originally it was commanded by Sir John Hepburn, who was killed at the siege of Saverne in 1636; it was then taken over by his nephew, Sir James Hepburn who was killed in action the following year. Douglas was appointed the new Colonel, and the name of the corps was altered to the Régiment de Douglas, and numbers increased to twenty companies of 100 Scotsmen.

The regiment fought with distinction, under Douglas, occasionally under the ultimate command of Henri de la Tour d'Auvergne, Vicomte de Turenne. Douglas was injured in August 1645, and received a letter of sympathy from Cardinal Mazarin. He was killed in a skirmish on the road between Arras and Douai on 21 October 1645, in an attempt to take the latter city from the Habsburgs. According to Fraser, Louis XIV had indicated his wish to raise Douglas to the rank of Field Marshal, on the very day that he died, though the appointment was never made.

Douglas' body was returned to Paris and buried at the Abbey of Saint-Germain-des-Prés, beside other members of his family, including William Douglas, 10th Earl of Angus, his grandfather. A fine memorial was erected to his memory in the Chapelle de Sainte-Thérèse, within the Abbey Church.

Douglas was succeeded as colonel by his elder brother, Archibald Douglas, Earl of Angus. The Régiment de Douglas returned to British service in 1662, and by 1812 it took its more famous name: The Royal Scots.

== See also ==
- Scotland and the Thirty Years' War
