= 1899–1900 Irish League =

Irish League
- Season: 1899–1900
- Dates: 2 September 1899 – 20 January 1900
- Champions: Celtic; 1st Irish title
- Matches: 27
- Goals: 95 (3.52 per match)
- Biggest home win: Linfield 5–0 Royal Scots
- Biggest away win: Cliftonville 0–4 Linfield
- Highest scoring: Glentoran 4–4 Linfield

The 1899–1900 Irish League was the 10th edition of the Irish League, the highest level of league competition in Irish football.

The league comprised six teams, and Celtic won the championship for the 1st time.

== Season summary ==
The North Staffordshire Regiment, who had competed in the league since the 1896–97 season, were unable to compete this season due to being deployed to South Africa. They were replaced by another British Army team, the Royal Scots. However Royal Scots themselves had to resign from the league after seven games due to the regiment also being posted to South Africa to serve in the Second Boer War. Their remaining matches were left unplayed with no points awarded.

== Teams and locations ==
Location of teams in the 1899–1900 Irish League; all matches were played in Belfast

Team	Town	Home Ground
Celtic	Belfast	Celtic Park
Cliftonville	Belfast	Solitude
Distillery	Belfast	Grosvenor Park
Glentoran	Belfast	The Oval
Linfield	Belfast	Balmoral
Royal Scots	No home ground	

== League standings ==
Pos	Team	Pld	W	D	L	GF	GA	GR	Pts	Result
1	Celtic (C)	9	6	1	2	19	11	1.727	13	Champions
2	Linfield	9	4	4	1	21	10	2.100	12	
3	Distillery	10	4	4	2	17	13	1.308	12	
4	Cliftonville	10	3	4	3	19	22	0.864	10	
5	Royal Scots (Note: Royal Scots withdrew after seven games due to being posted to serve in the Second Boer War; their remaining fixtures were left unplayed with no points awarded)	7	2	1	4	10	17	0.588	5	Withdrew
6	Glentoran	9	0	2	7	9	22	0.409	2	

Source: rsssf.com
(C) Champions

== Results ==
Home \ Away	CEL	CLI	DIS	GLT	LIN	RSC
Celtic		5–1	3–1	2–1	2–0	1–0
Cliftonville	0–0		3–1	4–1	0–4	2–2
Distillery	4–3	3–3		0–0	1–1	4–0
Glentoran	0–1	1–4	0–1		4–4	2–4
Linfield	4–2	1–1	0–0	2–0		5–0
Royal Scots	– (Note: Matches unplayed, no points awarded)	4–1	0–2	–	–	

Source: Irish League Archive
Legend: Blue = home team win; Yellow = draw; Red = away team win.
