= William Douglas =

William Douglas may refer to:

== Earls and Dukes of Queensberry ==
- William Douglas, 1st Earl of Queensberry (c. 1582–1640), Scottish nobleman
- William Douglas, 1st Duke of Queensberry (1637–1695), Scottish nobleman and politician, grandson of the above
- William Douglas, 4th Duke of Queensberry (1724–1810), Scottish nobleman, great-grandson of the above

== Earls of Angus ==
- William Douglas, 2nd Earl of Angus (c. 1398–1437), Scottish nobleman and soldier, grandson of the 1st Earl of Douglas
- William Douglas, 9th Earl of Angus (1533–1591), Scottish nobleman and supporter of Mary, Queen of Scots
- William Douglas, 10th Earl of Angus (1552–1611), Scottish nobleman, son of the above
- William Douglas, 1st Marquess of Douglas and 11th Earl of Angus (1589–1660), Scottish nobleman, son of the above

== Earls of Douglas ==
- William Douglas, 1st Earl of Douglas (c. 1327–1384), Scottish nobleman, grandson of William le Hardi, Lord of Douglas
- William Douglas, 6th Earl of Douglas (c. 1424–1440), Scottish nobleman
- William Douglas, 8th Earl of Douglas (1425–1452), Scottish nobleman, cousin of the above

== Earls of Morton ==
- William Douglas, 6th Earl of Morton (c. 1540–1606), Scottish nobleman
- William Douglas, 7th Earl of Morton (1582–1648), Scottish nobleman, grandson of the above
- William Douglas, 9th Earl of Morton (died c. 1681), Scottish nobleman, grandson of the above

== Lords of Douglas ==
- William I, Lord of Douglas (died c. 1214), medieval nobleman of Flemish origin
- William Longleg, Lord of Douglas (c. 1220–c. 1274), Scoto-Norman nobleman, grandson of the above
- William le Hardi, Lord of Douglas (1243–c. 1298), Scottish soldier and governor of Berwick Castle, son of the above
- William IV, Lord of Douglas (died 1333), Scottish nobleman, grandson of the above

== Other nobles and knights ==
- William Douglas, Lord of Liddesdale (c. 1300–1353), Scottish nobleman and soldier, cousin of the 1st Earl of Douglas
- Sir William Douglas of Nithsdale (c. 1370–c. 1392), Scottish knight
- Sir William Douglas of Drumlanrig (died 1427), Scottish knight, grandson of the 1st Earl of Douglas
- William Douglas of Cluny (c. 1428–c. 1475), Scottish nobleman, son of the 2nd Earl of Angus
- Sir William Douglas of Glenbervie (c. 1473–1513), Scottish knight killed at the Battle of Flodden
- William Douglas, 2nd Lord Mordington (1626–c. 1671), Scottish nobleman, grandson of the 10th Earl of Angus
- Sir William Douglas of Kelhead (died 1673), Scottish Covenanter colonel, son of the 1st Earl of Queensberry
- William Hamilton, Duke of Hamilton (born Lord William Douglas, 1634–1694), Scottish nobleman and politician, son of the 1st Marquess of Douglas
- William Douglas, 14th of Cavers (c. 1688–1748), Scottish landowner and politician, MP for Roxburghshire 1715–22, 1727–34, 1742–47, and for Dumfries Burghs 1722–27
- Sir William Douglas, 4th Baronet (c. 1730–1783), Scottish landowner and politician, MP for Dumfries Burghs, great-great-grandson of Sir William Douglas of Kelhead
- Sir William Douglas, 1st Baronet (died 1809), Scottish mill owner, landowner and founder of Castle Douglas
- Lord William Douglas (1783–1859), Scottish politician and landowner, son of Sir William Douglas, 4th Baronet

== Arts ==
- William Douglas (poet) (c. 1672–1748), Scottish writer, probable author of the poem "Annie Laurie"
- William Douglas (painter, born 1780) (1780–1832), Scottish miniature and portrait painter
- Sir William Fettes Douglas (1822–1881), Scottish painter
- Billy Douglas (musician) (1912–1978), American jazz trumpeter and vocalist
- Bill Douglas (1934–1991), Scottish film director
- Bill Douglas (musician) (born 1944), Canadian composer, pianist and bassoonist

== Law ==
- William O. Douglas (1898–1980), United States Supreme Court justice
- Sir William Randolph Douglas (1921–2003), Chief Justice of Barbados

== Military ==
- William Douglas of Kirkness (1688–1747), Scottish general and politician
- William Douglas (American soldier) (1742–1777), American military officer during the American Revolutionary War
- Sir William Douglas (British Army officer, born 1770) (1770–1834), British Army general in the War of 1812
- Sir William Douglas of Balgillo (c. 1778–1818), British Army officer during the Napoleonic Wars
- William Bloomfield Douglas (1822–1906), Royal Navy officer and colonial official
- Sir William Douglas (British Army officer, born 1858) (1858–1920), British Army general in the First World War
- Sholto Douglas, 1st Baron Douglas of Kirtleside (William Sholto Douglas, 1893–1969), Marshal of the Royal Air Force

== Politics ==
- William Lewis Douglas (1845–1924), governor of Massachusetts, 1905–1906
- William Douglas (Canadian politician), member of the Legislative Assembly of New Brunswick, 1886–1892
- William H. Douglas (1853–1944), U.S. representative from New York
- Billy Douglas (politician) (fl. 1918–1963), unionist activist from Northern Ireland
- William Douglas (Northern Ireland politician, born 1923) (1923–2013), Orangeman and Assembly member
- Sir William Douglas (civil servant) (1890–1953), Scottish civil servant

== Sports ==
- William Douglas (cricketer, born 1848) (1848–1887), New Zealand cricketer
- Billy Douglas (rugby union) (1863–1943), Welsh rugby union player
- William Douglas (footballer, fl. 1890s), Scottish footballer for Newton Heath and Blackpool
- William Douglas (footballer, born 1890) (1890–1917), Scottish footballer for Queen's Park
- Bill Douglas (rugby union) (born c. 1898), Australian rugby union player
- William Douglas (cricketer, born 1903) (1903–1981), New Zealand cricketer
- William Douglas (footballer, fl. 1931–1934), Scottish footballer for Montrose, Brechin City, Blackburn Rovers, Dick, Kerr's XI and Rochdale in the 1930s
- William Douglas (boxer) (1940–1999), American boxer

== Other people ==
- William Douglas of Whittingehame (c. 1540–1595), senator of the College of Justice at Edinburgh, and a Royal conspirator
- William Douglas (sea captain) (died 1791), Scottish and American maritime fur trader
- William Douglas (priest) (died 1819), Church of England priest, Archdeacon of Wilts, 1799–1804
- William Douglas (advocate) (c. 1784–1821), Scottish advocate and member of parliament for Plympton Erle, 1812–1816
- William O. Douglas, American who in 1878 received a patent for a lenticular truss bridge

== Fictional characters ==
- Billy Douglas (One Life to Live), fictional character on the American television series One Life to Live

== Other uses ==
- Sir William Douglas (1801 ship), a slave ship captured by the French

== See also ==
- Douglas baronets
- William Douglass (disambiguation)
