= Cavers Castle =

Ruined tower house in Scottish Borders, Scotland

- Cavers, Scottish Borders, Scotland
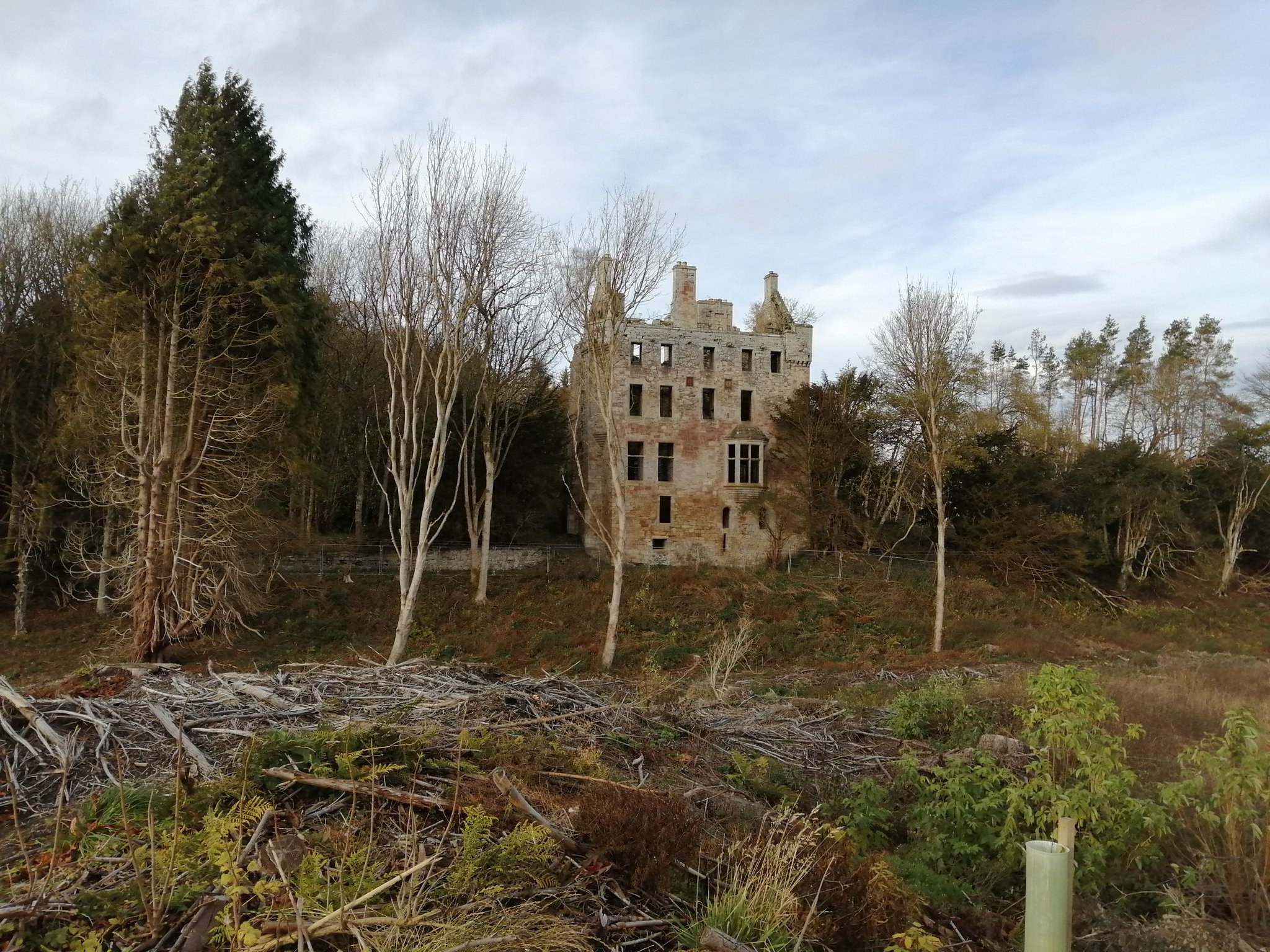
- Ruins of Cavers House, which incorporates parts of former castle.

Site information
- Condition: Ruined

Location
- Coordinates: 55°25′51″N 2°43′39″W

Cavers Castle, also known as Cavers House, is a ruined tower house located at Cavers, Scottish Borders, Scotland. Cavers Castle was a much extended tower house of the Douglas family dating back to the 15th or 16th century, and built upon the site of an earlier stronghold of the Balliols. It was repeatedly attacked during the 16th century wars with England, and substantially remodelled in the 17th century to form a mansion house, itself extended and remodelled in baronial style by Peddie and McKay in the 1890s. It was eventually deroofed and partially demolished in the 1950s, and was sold most recently in 2019. There are developing plans to restore the building, which is a listed building.

== History ==
The lay lands and barony of Cavers first appear in the hands of the Balliol family in 1268, when Alexander de Balliol of Cavers is first mentioned in documents. The church lands of Cavers, by comparison, were held by Jedburgh Abbey from early in the reign of King William the Lion.

During the Scottish Wars of Independence, Alexander Balliol of Cavers was captured – perhaps at Dunbar in 1296, and in return for his release fought for King Edward I of England from 1297, although the English kept his son in the Tower of London as insurance for his good behaviour. In 1311 the castle was occupied by an English garrison, but there are no mentions of it after the fall of Jedburgh Castle to the Scots in 1314. The English presentation of a priest to Cavers church in 1319 suggests the area remained subject to English authority. A safe conduct was issued at Cavers by James Douglas in 1321 to permit a group of English cavalry to enter Scotland, but the castle is not specifically mentioned. In 1358 Cavers was held by the Earl of Mar, the Balliols having been forfeited of their estates for their opposition to the regime of Robert the Bruce. In 1368 the Earl of Douglas, elsewhere at this date styled lord of the barony of Cavers was granted lands in the barony of Cavers in a document signed there, indicating that the buildings of a baronial centre of sorts had been erected there by this date. In 1397, Cavers was in the hands of Isabel, Countess of Mar, the niece of Earl Thomas, and in the early 15th century, she granted the lands and barony of Cavers to her nephew, Archibald Douglas, the younger of the two illegitimate sons of James, Earl of Douglas. This was disputed by King Robert III, who granted them to Sir David Fleming of Biggar, as well as by George Douglas, Earl of Angus, who had been granted the rights of Cavers held by Sir James Sandilands. Archibald had his grant confirmed by King James I in 1412, and became heritable Sheriff of Roxburgh/Teviotdale – these two titles were used interchangeably.

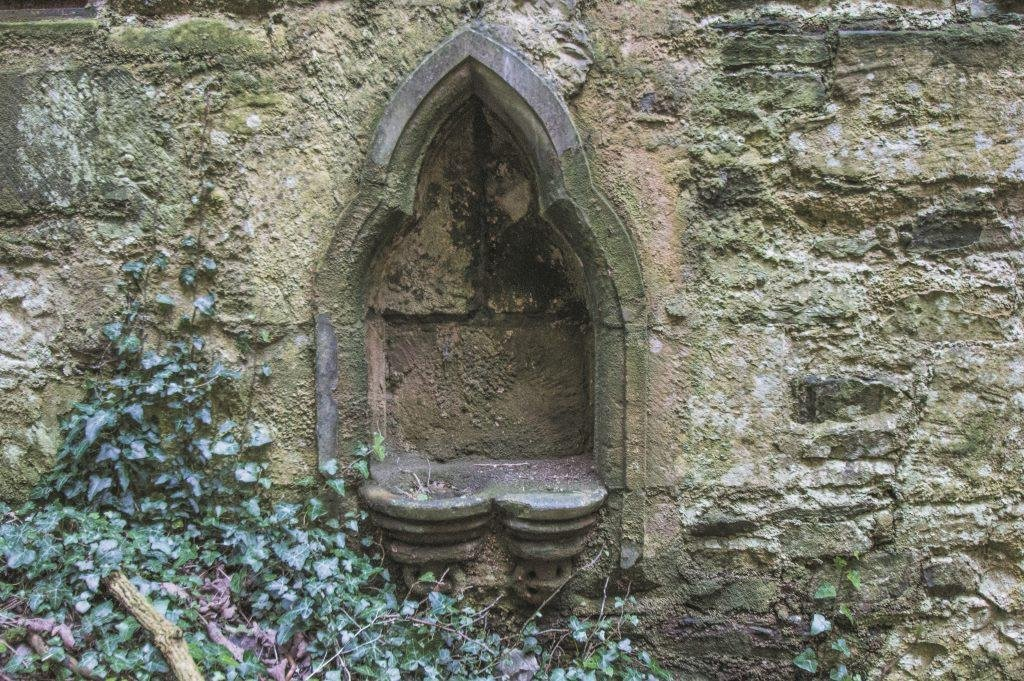
Mid-13th-century piscina at the castle

Given the general context of baronial castle building in Scotland and the Borders at this time, and the wealth and status of the Balliols, one might expect a ditched manorial centre, which may have been built, and defended, partially in timber. However, nothing remains today of the castle which can be conclusively identified as pre-dating the Douglas period of ownership. Although a mid-13th-century piscina has been built into the tower, it was set in place with cement, dating this event firmly to the late 19th or early 20th century.

Again, given the general context, it is likely that Archibald (last mentioned in 1455) was the builder of the tower house which formed the core of the castle up until its demolition in the 1950s. On the basis of general style, the tower is dated to the 15th or early 16th century, and the “castrum” of Cavers is first mentioned in a charter of 1511.

William Douglas of Cavers was "well-beloved" by James III, and he and his followers fought for James III at the battle of Sauchieburn on 11 June 1488, St Barnabas day. They were forgiven by his victorious son James IV. A charter of 1509 mentions that William Douglas of Cavers had been killed resisting the English. James IV made the castle and lands of Cavers a free barony in August 1511 for Sir James Douglas (d. 1545). In 1523 Teviotdale was attacked by the English with its strongholds described as overthrown, and again in 1542.

=== Raid of Cavers ===
An English letter refers to a 1535 raid as the "roode of Cavers" involving Walter Scott, laird of Buccleuch, and the Dacres. In April 1535, James V attainted Scott for joining the raid. As late as March 1543, Regent Arran forgave Walter Scott for the burning of Cavers and Denholm with the English border warden Lord Dacre and Christopher Dacre.

Cavers was burnt in June 1542 by English raiders led by Jak of Musgay and Little John Heron, who burnt lands and stole goods on the Caill Water and in Teviotdale.

=== Rough Wooing ===
During the war known as the Rough Wooing the tower of Cavers or its farm was burnt by Lord Hertford in September 1545. In 1547, after the battle of Pinkie, William Douglas of Cavers (the sixth laird) swore allegiance to King Edward VI along with the Kerr lairds of Ferniehirst and Cessford. The English journalist of the war, William Patten, wrote that the Laird of Cavers gave his oath of assurance to the Duke of Somerset on 23 September 1547 at Roxburgh Castle, with many other lairds of Teviotdale and the marches.

The lairds of Cavers are not prominent in records at this time, being overshadowed by the Kerr Wardens of the Middle March, whose authority was military and cross-border. The domestic authority of the sheriff was perhaps less important. The tower house remained a significant building, being depicted as a tall tower, barmkin wall and ancillary courtyard buildings on Pont's map of 1590 – 1600. From the disbanding of the guard on the border by King James VI in 1621, any remaining military function the castle may have had ceased, and from this date onwards it served primarily as the residence of the Douglas lairds.

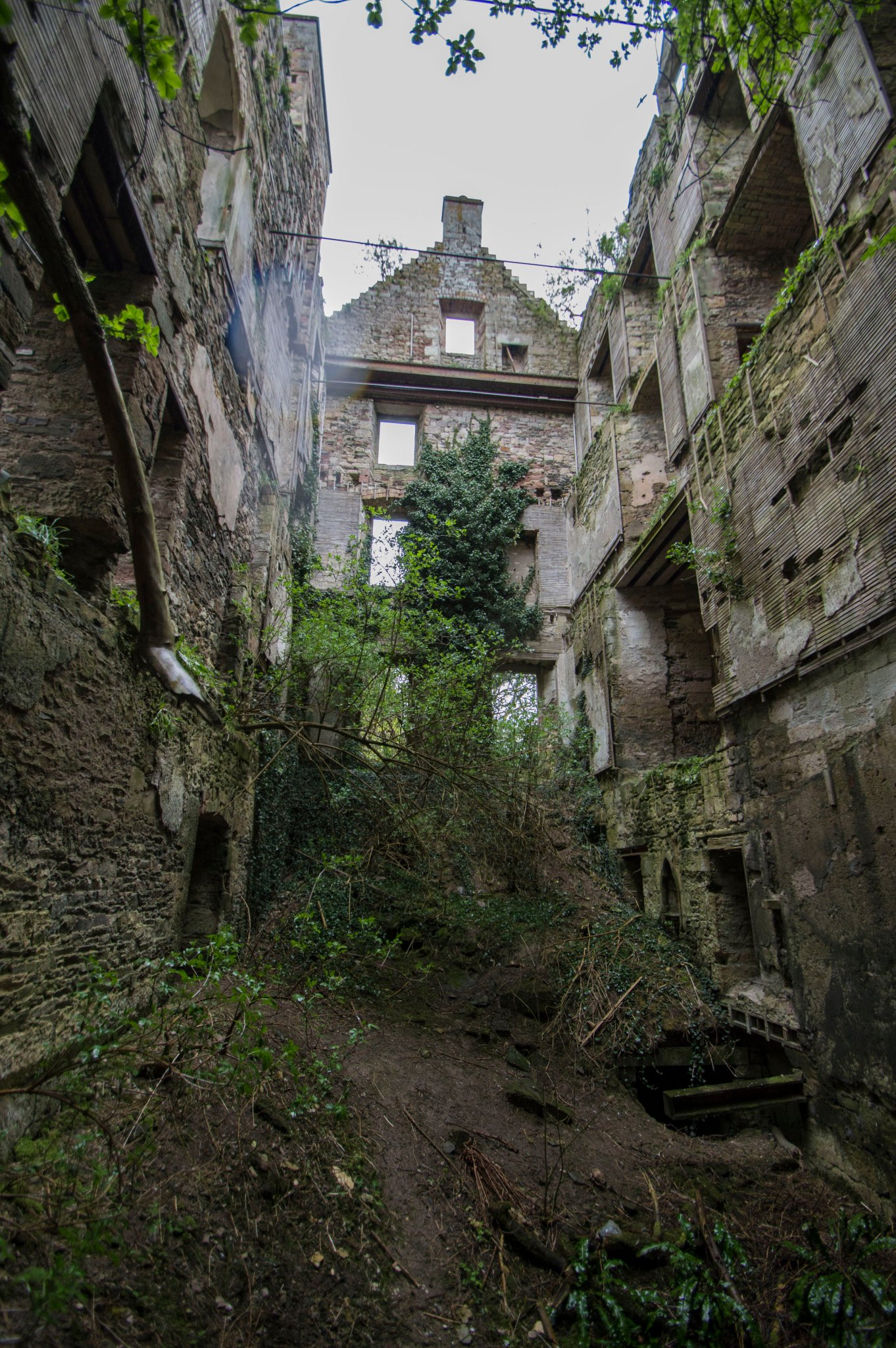
Inside the tower

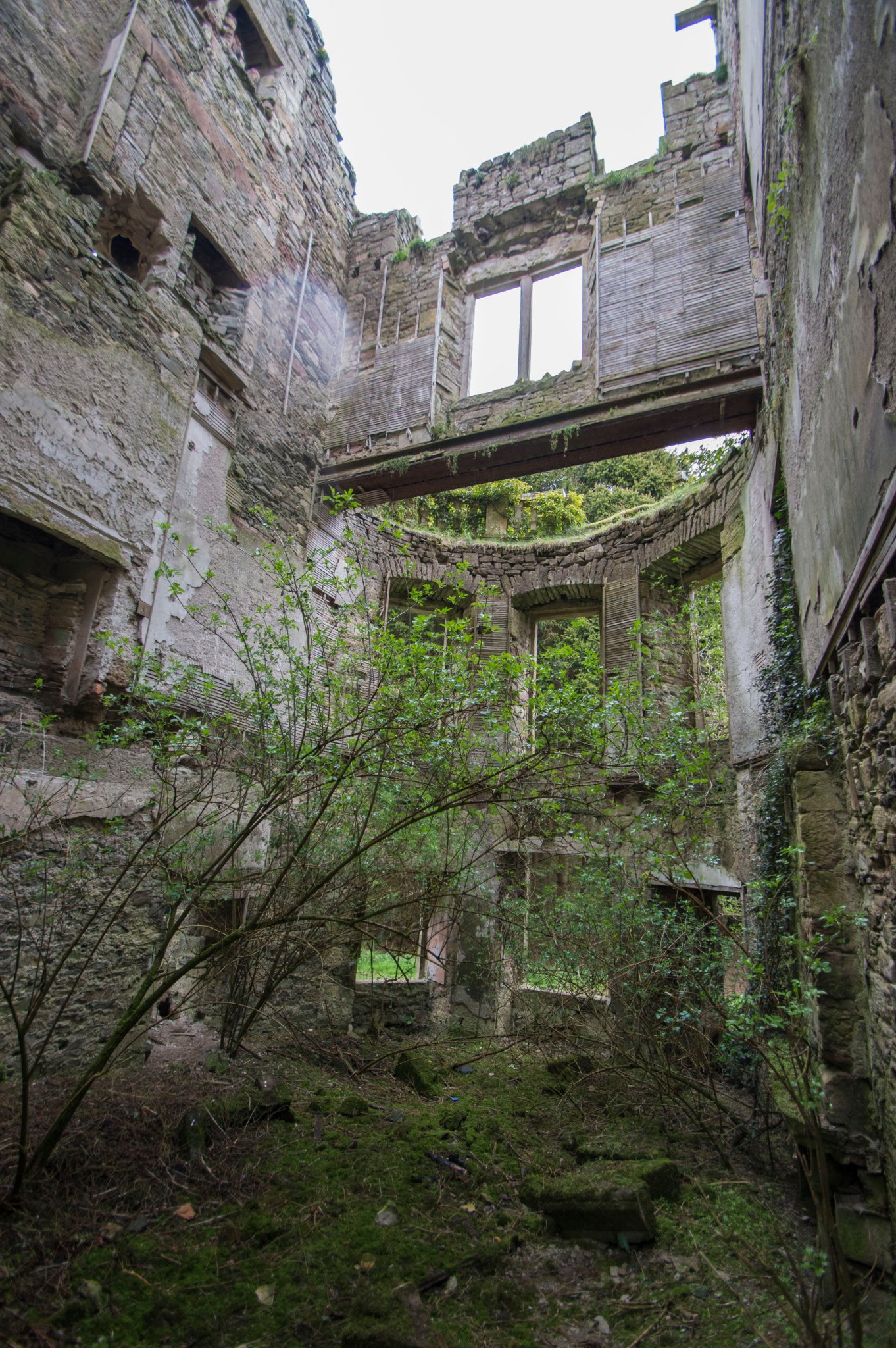
Inside the castle wing

=== Rising of the North ===
In January 1570, Richard Norton and his son Francis, English exiles from Naworth after the Rising of the North found a refuge at Cavers. Robert Constable came to Cavers to spy on them and other fugitives. In the 1580s, Robert Douglas of Cavers was Gentleman of Horse to Archibald Douglas, 8th Earl of Angus. James VI and I made a return visit to Scotland in 1617. He rode from Dunglass Castle to Cavers on 14 May 1617. While the king was at Cavers, he knighted William Fenwick of Northumberland.

=== Decline ===
Sir William Douglas, ninth laird of Cavers, surrendered his hereditary office of Sheriff of Roxburghshire to the crown in 1626 for £20,000 Scots. He was a supporter of the National Covenant, and the Hawick Covenant, which he signed in 1638, was kept at Cavers. Development of the castle after 1603 is as yet unclear, but it is clear that the estate, like many others suffered financially during the latter 17th and first half of the 18th century. The family also failed to flourish, with the 12th, 14th, 15th, and 16th lairds all being succeeded by brothers, and the 17th laird by a cousin. The last of the direct male Douglas line died in 1878. The military map drawn up by General William Roy of c1750 shows that the house was the centre of a large estate, but was not surrounded by much in the way of formal gardens. The earliest photographs of Cavers House show that it had been much extended by the late 19th century, when the Palmer Douglas family had become lairds, and domesticized to have the appearance of a large house, the old tower being completely subsumed. At this time the house was often leased out to guests along with shooting rights, the family themselves preferring to reside at Midgard House from 1863. Amongst people known to have worked at the house during the 19th century was the botanist John Scott, who served his horticultural apprenticeship at Cavers.

=== Baronial remodelling ===
In the 1890s, the house was remodelled in grand baronial style, which was undoubtedly a further burden to a struggling estate, but the impact of both World Wars was substantial, and according to family records Archibald Palmer Douglas returned to Cavers House from Midgard in the 1940s, which was provided with electricity in 1946 for the first time. He died the following year, and his son James factored the estate on behalf of his grandmother until 1949. Death duties resulted in the estate being broken up, and although James attempted to sell the house, he could not find a buyer, and after being deroofed, the house was used for explosives practice in 1954 before being sold off along with the rest of the broken-up estate. The old tower survives as a shell along with part of the attached mansion.
