= Drumlanrig =

Village in Dumfries and Galloway, Scotland

Coordinates: 55.273651°N 3.808690°W

Drumlanrig (Scottish Gaelic: Druim Lannraig) is a settlement in Dumfries and Galloway, Scotland, which is best known for nearby Drumlanrig Castle. The earliest record for Drumlanrig is from 1374, spelled Drumlangryg.

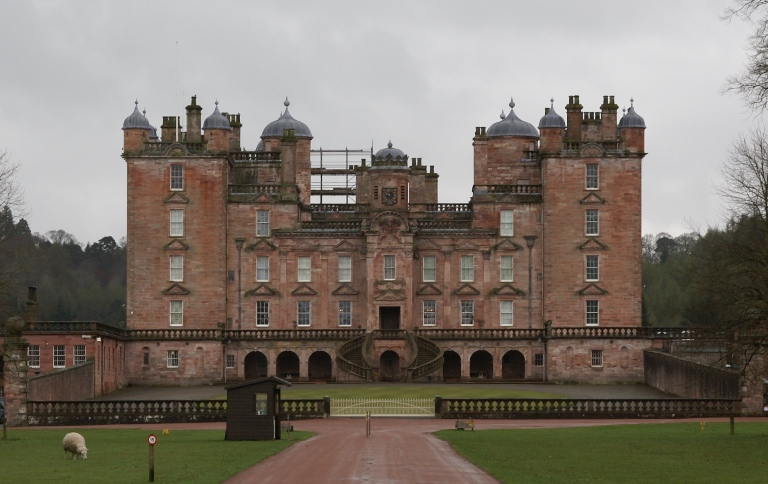
Drumlanrig Castle.

== Etymology ==
There are a number of possible etymologies for the name. It may represent Cumbric drum 'ridge' + -lanerc 'small area of cleared woodland'. However, the first element may also be Gaelic druim 'ridge', either added to a Cumbric name or to Scots *lang-rigg 'long ridge'.

== Location (1374) ==
The charter for the Drumlanrig barony originates in 1356, but the first stated location is in a charter dated 28 May 1374. "The barony stretched from the Marr Burn, close to Drumlanrig Castle upwards along the western side of the river Nith into Sanquhar parish, including some lands on the eastern side of the river, and also others in the parishes of Dunscore and Penpont, [...] Glenym, Fardine-Malloch, Dalpeddar, Auchensow, Auchingreuch, Castle-Gilmour, Muirhouse, Powgaun (Polgowan), Arkland, Dalgoner, Balagan, Coshogle, Benzery, Benans, Corsfarding, Ellioc."

== Barony of Drumlanrig ==
Established in the 13 Nov 1356 by King David II of Scotland by right of his father, James Douglas, 2nd Earl of Douglas, for his illegitimate son, William Douglas.

- William Douglas, 1st of Drumlanrig (c 1378- c 1421)
- William Douglas, 2nd of Drumlanrig (c 1395- c 1458)
- William Douglas, 3rd of Drumlanrig (c 1415- 1464)
- William Douglas, 4th of Drumlanrig (c 1435- 22 Jul 1484, Battle of Kirtle)
- James Douglas, 5th of Drumlanrig (c 1462- c1498)
- William Douglas, 6th of Drumlanrig (10 Mar 1481- 9 Sep 1513, Battle of Flodden Field)
- James Douglas, 7th of Drumlanrig (27 Dec 1498- 27 Dec 1578)
- James Douglas, 8th of Drumlanrig- grandson of the 7th (-16 Oct 1615). The 8th Baron was succeeded by his son, William, who became the 1st Earl of Queensberry.
