= William Douglas (British Army officer, born 1770) =

Major-General Sir William Douglas KCH (8 September 1770 – 14 April 1834) was a Scottish officer in the British Army.

The son of Archibald Douglas, 10th of Timpendean and of Bonjedward, and his wife Helen Bennett, William Douglas is descended from the daughter of William, 1st Earl of Douglas, and thereafter through 12 generations of father to son.

He entered the army in 1786, as ensign in the 1st Battalion of the 1st of Foot, and was appointed lieutenant in 1789. He served in both ranks in the West Indies.

He served in Ireland during the whole of the rebellion, and was afterwards appointed to the staff there in the capacity of Assistant-Quartermaster-General. In 1805, in command of the 98th Regiment, which he had helped form, he served with the regiment in Nova Scotia, Canada; Bermuda; and on the coast of America.

General Sir John Coape Sherbrooke, commander of the British forces in the Atlantic provinces, led an expedition into the long-disputed borderland between Passamaquoddy Bay and the Penobscot River, which he renamed the colony of New Ireland. Sherbrooke led an expeditionary force that August which successfully landed at Castine and proceeded to subdue the entire region between the Penobscot and the St Croix. It was Lieut.-Colonel Douglas, with part of the army which first landed, which took possession of the fort and town of Castine.

He returned with the regiment to Europe in 1815, which was reduced in 1818. He was promoted to major-general in 1819 and appointed colonel of the 2nd Royal Veteran Battalion.

In 1810, he married Marianne Tattersall, with whom he had several children (7 or 9, depending on sources), including a son born in Cork in 1817. He was appointed a Knight Commander of the Royal Guelphic Order in 1832.

Douglas died at Kensington in April 1834, aged 62. He was succeeded by his son, Major George Douglas, 12th of Timpendean, who was later to sell the estate in 1843. Accused of killing a bullock whilst posted to Alderney, and on denying it, George was subsequently tried and convicted on his 30th Birthday in 1849 for conduct unbecoming an officer.
