= Sir William Douglas, 2nd Baronet =

Sir William Douglas, 2nd Baronet may refer to:

- Sir William Douglas, 2nd Baronet of Glenbervie, (died c. 1680), see Douglas Baronets#Douglas of Glenbervie (1625)
- Sir William Douglas, 2nd Baronet of Kelhead (c. 1675–1733), see Douglas Baronets#Douglas of Kelhead (1668)
- Admiral Sir William Henry Douglas, 2nd Baronet of Carr (died 1809), see Douglas Baronets#Douglas of Carr (1777)

== See also ==
- Douglas Baronets
- William Douglas (disambiguation)
