= George Douglas, 1st Earl of Angus =

Scottish nobleman and peer

George Douglas
- Earl of Angus
- Predecessor: New Creation
- Successor: William Douglas, 2nd Earl of Angus
- Born: 1380; Tantallon Castle, Kingdom of Scotland
- Died: 1403 (aged 22–23); England (from Plague)
- Noble family: Angus
- Spouse: Mary Stewart
- Issue: William Douglas, 2nd Earl of Angus; Elizabeth Douglas
- Father: William Douglas, 1st Earl of Douglas
- Mother: Margaret Stewart, 3rd Countess of Angus

George Douglas, 1st Earl of Angus (1380–1403) was a Scottish nobleman and peer.

== Life ==
He was born at Tantallon Castle, East Lothian, Scotland. He was the natural-illegitimate son of William Douglas, 1st Earl of Douglas and Margaret Stewart, Dowager Countess of Mar & Countess of Angus and Lady Abernethy in her own right.

His father's wife Margaret had already produced an heir for her Lord in 1358, James, 2nd Earl of Douglas and Mar, who succeeded his father upon his death in 1384.

In 1389, Margaret of Angus relinquished her title in favour of her son, but George did not assume it until his betrothal in 1397 to Princess Mary Stewart, daughter of King Robert III of Scotland. The influence of George's mother must have been considerable - in addition to obtaining a royal bride for George, she persuaded King Robert III to confirm him in his style of Earl of Angus, and also to bestow upon him the lordships of Abernethy (Perthshire) and Bonkill (Berwickshire); and "to endow him and his spouse with the justiciary fees of the County of Forfar, to ratify all gifts, entails, and leases made or to be made by his half-sister, Isabel, Countess of Mar, to the said Jorge her brothir".

James 2nd Earl of Douglas, was killed without issue in 1388, at the Battle of Otterburn, and the Earldom of Mar, and all non-entailed Douglas possessions passed to his sister Isabel. The earldom of Douglas passed to a cousin, Archibald the Grim, a natural (illegitimate) son of the Good Sir James Douglas.

The descendants of Archibald the Grim formed the famed Black Douglas line, and those of George formed the longer lived Red Douglas line.

Angus does not appear to have taken much interest in Public life, although his name appears on various minor charters. However, in 1402, he was dispatched under orders of the Duke of Albany, Regent of Scotland, to accompany Murdoch, Earl of Fife and the Earl of Moray to assist Archibald Douglas, 4th Earl of Douglas during his invasion of Northumberland. That incursion ended at the disastrous field of Homildon Hill, where the Scots were routed and all of the above taken prisoner. Both Moray and Angus died of the Plague whilst captive.

== Issue ==
By his wife, Mary Stewart, a daughter of King Robert III, Angus had two children:

1. William Douglas, 2nd Earl of Angus (1398–1437)
2. Lady Elizabeth Douglas, married firstly to Sir Alexander Forbes, later 1st Lord Forbes; married secondly to Sir David Hay of Yester.

Mary was to marry a further four times and bear seven more children by three of these husbands. The issue by her second husband, Sir James Kennedy the Younger of Dunure, were the ancestors of the Marquesses of Ailsa; The product of her fourth marriage to William, 1st Lord Graham were the ancestors of the Viscounts of Dundee and the Dukes of Montrose.

== Sources ==
- Maxwell, Sir Herbert.A History of the House of Douglas. Freemantle, London 1902
- Godscroft, David Hume of. Ane Historie of the House and Race of Douglas and Angus. Edinburgh 1646
- Brown, Michael. The Black Douglases. Tuckwell press, East Linton, East Lothian 1998
- From the Bloody Heart, Oliver Thomson. Sutton, Stroud, Gloucs. 2003

Peerage of Scotland
New creation	Earl of Angus; 1389–1403	Succeeded by William Douglas
