= Bonjedward =

Village in Scottish Borders, Scotland

Coordinates: 55.5038°N 2.5457°W

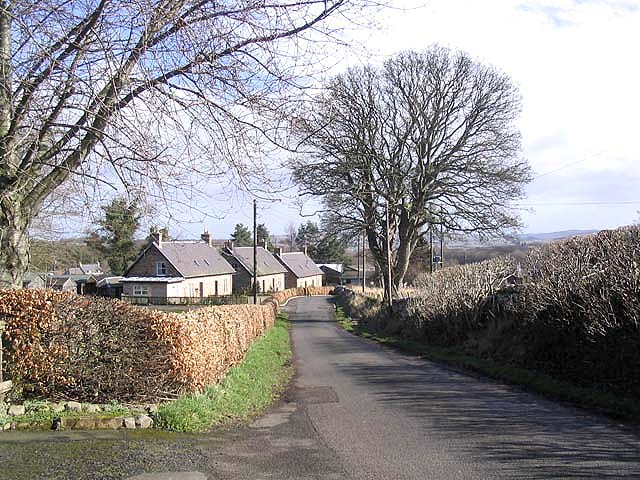
Bonjedward

Bonjedward (Scottish Gaelic: Bun Jedward) is a hamlet in the Scottish Borders area of Scotland, two miles north of Jedburgh where the Jed Water joins the River Teviot.

The village stands on a ridge of land formed by the approach of the Teviot and Jed Water towards their junction. Nearby are Ancrum, Lanton, Monteviot House, Peniel Heugh, the Timpendean Tower and the Waterloo Monument. The grid reference for Bonjedward is 654 223 and the postal code is TD8.

== Place name ==
Bonjedward, recorded as Bonjedworth in 1342, is formed of the original name of Jedburgh (Gedwearde c.1050, Gedwirth 1177) and the Gaelic word bun 'river-mouth'. 'Jedward', rather than 'Jed' has been interpreted as the name of the river by the Gaelic speakers who coined Bonjedward. 'Jedward' itself is formed of the ancient river-name 'Jed' and Old English weorð 'an enclosure' (later 'an enclosed homestead'). The element weorð was replaced by Middle English burgh 'town'; Jeddeburgh is recorded in c.1160. The name Jed is of obscure origin. James has suggested that it may derive from Proto-Indo-European *wei(h_{1})- d- 'a bend, something curved or twisted'. He also notes that Scots Gedde- in Jedburgh may have been adopted from Cumbric gwï:δ 'a wood', and that the river name may be a back-formation.

== History ==
The castle and town of Bonjedworth suffered their full share of the miseries of border warfare. The castle was converted at a later period into a jail. In 1683 Sir John Biddell of that ilk and another were tried at the court of justiciary at Jedburgh for their religious opinions, and sentenced to be confined in the prison of Bonjedworth. The castle is now so completely demolished that not a trace of even its situation can be found. It was, in 1850, an inconsiderable hamlet though once a seat of strength having possessed a castle of some note.

A short distance farther to the west of the likely castle site is Bonjedward House, a Georgian house dating from the 18th century. It was remodelled and extended during the next century and is set in an imposing position in the centre of its own extensive gardens. The house is built of cream sandstone rubble with polished cream ashlar dressings.

Bonjedward was, as part of large holdings in the Jedburgh Forest, and elsewhere, in 1320 granted by Robert Bruce, earl of Carrick to Sir James Douglas, partly as a reward for his support at the battle of Bannockburn, and partly to bind him to the Bruce cause. These estates passed to James, 2nd Earl of Douglas. Douglas married the Princess Isabel, a daughter of King Robert II of Scotland. He left no legitimate male issue. His natural sons William and Archibald became the ancestors of the families of Douglas of Drumlanrig (see Marquess of Queensberry) and Douglas of Cavers. His sister Isabel, inherited the lands and earldom of Mar, and the unentailed estates of Douglas. Isabel arranged for the Bonjedward estate to be passed to their half-sister, Margaret, who became 1st Laird of Bonjedward. Margaret had married a Thomas Johnson, but he and his son, John, changed their names to Douglas.

In 1479, George Douglas of Bonjedward, with consent of his heir, James, granted Timpendean to a younger son, Andrew. James appears to have died before his father, so in 1540 William Douglas, then son and heir of the late George Douglas of Bonjedward became Laird of Bonjedward.

In about 1710, Thomas Rutherfurd of Edgerston acquired the lands of Bonjedward and Mounthooly, together with the estates of Hunthill and Scraesburgh. In 1845, Bonjedward was sold to the Marquess of Lothian, in whose ownership much of the estate continues, the estate offices being located in the stables for Jedneuk House in Bonjedward, which were converted to form a suite of offices.

== See also ==
- List of places in the Scottish Borders
- List of places in Scotland
