= Peniel Heugh =

Hill in Scotland

Coordinates: 55.5292°N 2.5508°W

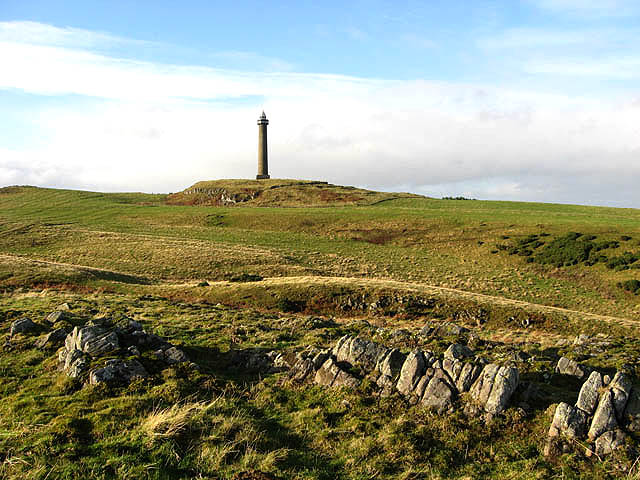
The Waterloo Monument on Peniel Heugh

Peniel Heugh (/ˈpaɪnəl.ˈhjuː/; 237 m) is a hill near Ancrum and Nisbet in the Scottish Borders area of Scotland. On it stands the Waterloo Monument. It was also the site of an Iron Age hillfort.

== Geology ==
The heugh is composed of olivine micrograbbro, and is a volcanic plug.

== Geography ==
Places nearby include Bonjedward, Crailing, Jedburgh, Monteviot House, Roxburgh.

The Roman Heritage Way and St. Cuthbert's Way pass by the heugh and the monument.

== See also ==
- List of places in the Scottish Borders

== Sources ==
- Parkhouse, G (2006), 'Peniel heugh, Scottish Borders (Crailing parish), fieldwalking', Dorchester
