= James Douglas, 3rd Earl of Angus =

Scottish nobleman

James Douglas
- Earl of Angus; Lord Abernethy; Lord Bonkyll & Preston; Lord Jedburgh Forest
- Predecessor: William Douglas, 2nd Earl of Angus
- Successor: George Douglas, 4th Earl of Angus
- Born: 1426; Tantallon Castle, Kingdom of Scotland
- Died: 1446 (aged 19–20); Tantallon, Kingdom of Scotland
- Noble family: Angus
- Father: William Douglas, 2nd Earl of Angus
- Mother: Margaret Hay of Yester

James Douglas, 3rd Earl of Angus, Lord of Liddesdale and Jedburgh Forest (1426–1446) was a Scottish nobleman. He was the son of William Douglas, 2nd Earl of Angus and Margaret Hay of Yester.

Angus succeeded at the age of eleven years and was soon involved in strife with his Black Douglas cousins. He was forfeited of his estates by James II in 1445, under the influence of his near cousin William Douglas, 8th Earl of Douglas. The Earl of Douglas was trying to consolidate the power which he had gained through the murder of his cousins at the "Black Dinner" at Edinburgh Castle, sanctioned by the king and his own father James the Gross, 7th Earl of Douglas.

It has been suggested that the feud between the Black and Red Lines of the House of Douglas was encouraged by Bishop Kennedy of St. Andrews as a method of curtailing the power of unruly magnates, and ensuring continued Stewart reign. Kennedy was a first cousin through Angus' grandmother, Princess Mary of Scotland, a daughter of King Robert III.

During his forfeiture, Angus was surprised at the reluctance of his tenantry to pay their Feus, he made a point of collecting them punctually in person.

Angus died in 1446. He was betrothed briefly to Princess Joan, third daughter of King James I, she was eighteen years old when he died and was with her sister the Dauphine of France. She later married James Douglas, 1st Earl of Morton, the head of the Douglases of Dalkeith. Angus was succeeded by his brother, George Douglas, 4th Earl of Angus in 1446.

Peerage of Scotland
Preceded by William Douglas	Earl of Angus; 1437–1446	Succeeded by George Douglas
