= William Douglas, 2nd Earl of Angus =

Scottish nobleman and soldier

William Douglas
- Earl of Angus
- Predecessor: George Douglas, 1st Earl of Angus
- Successor: James Douglas, 3rd Earl of Angus
- Born: 1398; Tantallon Castle, Kingdom of Scotland
- Died: 1437 (aged 38–39); Tantallon, Kingdom of Scotland
- Noble family: Angus
- Spouse: Margaret Hay
- Issue: James Douglas, 3rd Earl of Angus; George Douglas, 4th Earl of Angus; William Douglas of Cluny; Hugh Douglas, Rector of St. Andrews; Helen Douglas
- Father: George Douglas, 1st Earl of Angus
- Mother: Mary Stewart

William Douglas, 2nd Earl of Angus (24 February 1398 – October 1437) was a Scottish nobleman and soldier. The son of George Douglas, 1st Earl of Angus and Mary Stewart, he was a grandson of King Robert III.

The story of Angus' life is interwoven with that of his uncle and King, James I of Scotland.

Angus was born about 1398 at Tantallon Castle in East Lothian. He inherited the Earldom of Angus in 1402, following his father's death of the plague whilst in English captivity, following the Battle of Homildon Hill.

== Return of King James ==
In 1420, Angus was nominated as one of twenty-one noblemen to be delivered as hostages to the English court as security for the ransom of King James I. James had been captured by the English in 1406, and was held by first Henry IV of England, and latterly by his son Henry V of England. During the king's captivity, Scotland was ruled by his uncle Robert Stewart, Duke of Albany, who had been in no hurry to pay his nephew's ransom. Following the death of Albany in 1420 the Scots finally paid the ransom monies owed. Whatever the machinations that followed, Angus was not included on the final list of hostages, but was one of the party of Scots nobles who met their King at Durham, in 1424. The King was escorted triumphantly back to Scotland, and Angus received a Knighthood from the King at his coronation at Scone Abbey on the 2 June of that year.

== Royal Gaoler ==
In 1425, a purge took place of the Albany Stewarts and their adherents. The trial which followed at Stirling Castle, included Angus amongst a large faction of Douglas nobles within the jury. Facing execution were Murdoch Stewart, 2nd Duke of Albany, his two sons Alaisdair and Walter, and the Earl of Lennox. The widowed Duchess of Albany, was held a close prisoner at Tantallon under the supervision of Angus for eight years.

In 1429, King James went north to deal with the Lord of the Isles. Alexander of Islay, Earl of Ross. This in response to Alexander and his Islemen's burning of Inverness following James' treachery and slaughter of some Highland chiefs in 1427. Angus was a captain in the Royal army and when Alexander Macdonald, Lord of the Isles finally submitted to the King at Holyrood Abbey he was entrusted with the keeping of Alexander at Tantallon for two years.

== Warden of the Marches ==
In 1430 Angus was sent on embassy to England as one of the commissioners to negotiate an extension of the truce with the newly crowned Henry VI of England which was prolonged for five years. Later in that year he was appointed Warden of the Middle March. In 1435 Angus led a troop of men to invest Dunbar Castle. The castellan, George II, Earl of March, had previously been made a ward of the King, and the garrison surrendered the castle bloodlessly.

Dunbar castle was then held of the King by Angus and Sir Adam Hepburn of Hailes.

Dunbar fled to England calling for help in regaining Dunbar castle by force of arms. This help materialised in the spring of 1435 when Sir Robert Ogle, the Governor of Berwick upon Tweed, with Henry Percy and 4000 men marched north to retake the Castle. Angus, with Hepburn and Alexander Ramsay of Dalhousie, decided not to undergo a siege and engaged with the English forces at the Battle of Piperdean, near to Cockburnspath. This encounter resulted in defeat for the English but with little loss of life. Fifteen hundred prisoners were taken and ransomed.

== Later life ==
Angus continued to consolidate his estates, often at the expense of his cousins the Black Douglases, taking positions and fortresses previously held by the Earls of Douglas, such as Lintalee and finally Hermitage Castle for a time. Following the assassination of his uncle, King James in February 1437, Angus was instrumental in the pursuit and capture of the conspirators. These included, Walter Stewart, Earl of Atholl, a great-uncle of Angus himself. Angus died in the October of the same year, aged thirty-nine.

== Marriage and issue ==
Angus' mother remarried in 1409 to Sir James Kennedy younger of Dunure. It is thought that around this time that Angus was betrothed through negotiations by his grandmother, Margaret Stewart, 3rd Countess of Angus, to Margaret Hay, daughter of Sir William Hay of Yester. They married in 1425 and they had five children:

- James Douglas, 3rd Earl of Angus
- George Douglas, 4th Earl of Angus
- William Douglas of Cluny
- Hugh Douglas, Rector of St. Andrews
- Helen Douglas, m. 1st. William (2nd Lord Graham of Kincardine) Graham; 2nd. James Ogilvy, 1st Lord Ogilvy of Airlie

Latterly, Angus' sister, Lady Elizabeth Douglas, would marry his brother in law, Sir David Hay of Yester. Through their son John Hay, 1st Lord Hay of Yester they are the ancestors of the Marquesses of Tweeddale.

== Ancestry ==
Ancestry of William Douglas, 2nd Earl of Angus

8. Sir Archibald Douglas
4. William Douglas, 1st Earl of Douglas
9. Beatrice de Lindsay
2. George Douglas, 1st Earl of Angus
10. Thomas Stewart, 2nd Earl of Angus
5. Margaret Stewart, 4th Countess of Angus
11. Margaret Sinclair
1. William Douglas, 2nd Earl of Angus
12. Robert II of Scotland
6. Robert III of Scotland
13. Elizabeth Mure
3. Mary Stewart of Scotland
14. Sir John Drummond
7. Anabella Drummond
15. Mary Montifex

Peerage of Scotland
Preceded by George Douglas	Earl of Angus; 1402–1437	Succeeded by James Douglas
