= William Douglass =

William Douglass may refer to:

- William Douglass (abolitionist) (1804–1862), American abolitionist and church community leader
- William Douglass (engineer, born 1831) (1831–1923), engineer-in-chief for Trinity House and later for the Commissioners of Irish Lights
- William Douglass (engineer) (1857–1913), Chief Engineer for the Commissioners of Irish Lights
- William Douglass (physician) (1691–1752), physician and pamphleteer in Boston
- Bill Douglass (1923–1994), American jazz drummer
- Klondike Douglass (William Bingham Douglass, 1872–1953), American Major League Baseball player
- William Boone Douglass, lawyer, engineer, surveyor and genealogist

== See also ==
- William Douglas (disambiguation)
