= Waterloo Monument =

Memorial in Scotland, completed in 1824

Coordinates: 55°31′45.22″N 2°33′00.7″W

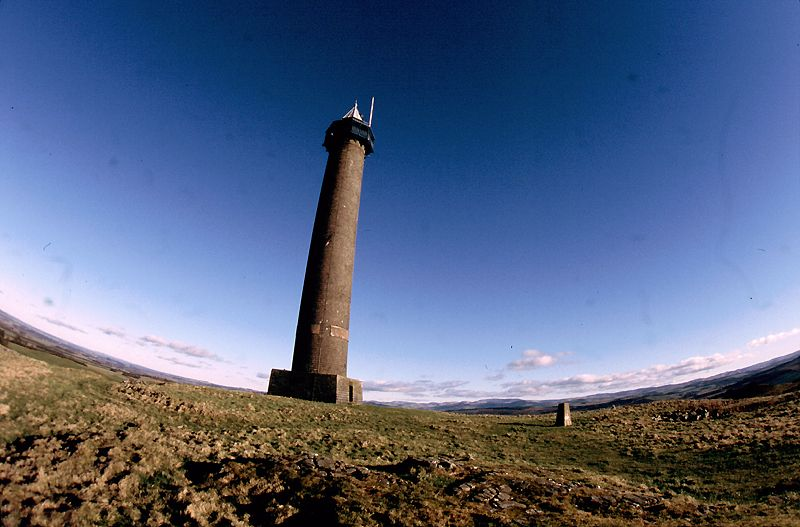
Waterloo Monument

The Waterloo Monument near Ancrum in the Scottish Borders is a 150-foot tower, built between 1817 and 1824 to commemorate the Battle of Waterloo. It was designed by the architect Archibald Elliot, after the original monument designed by William Burn collapsed.

The monument stands on Peniel Heugh, OS ref: NT 653263, a hill between Ancrum and Nisbet, Roxburghshire. It is on private land, but walkers may park at the Harestanes Visitor Centre and then follow the marked walk to the top of the hill. The tower can be climbed using a key which can be borrowed at a small cost from the Lothian Estates Office in nearby Bonjedward. Inside the monument is a spiral staircase with 226 steps leading to the wooden balcony which encircles the top of the tower. The memorial at the Battle of Waterloo in Belgium also has 226 steps.

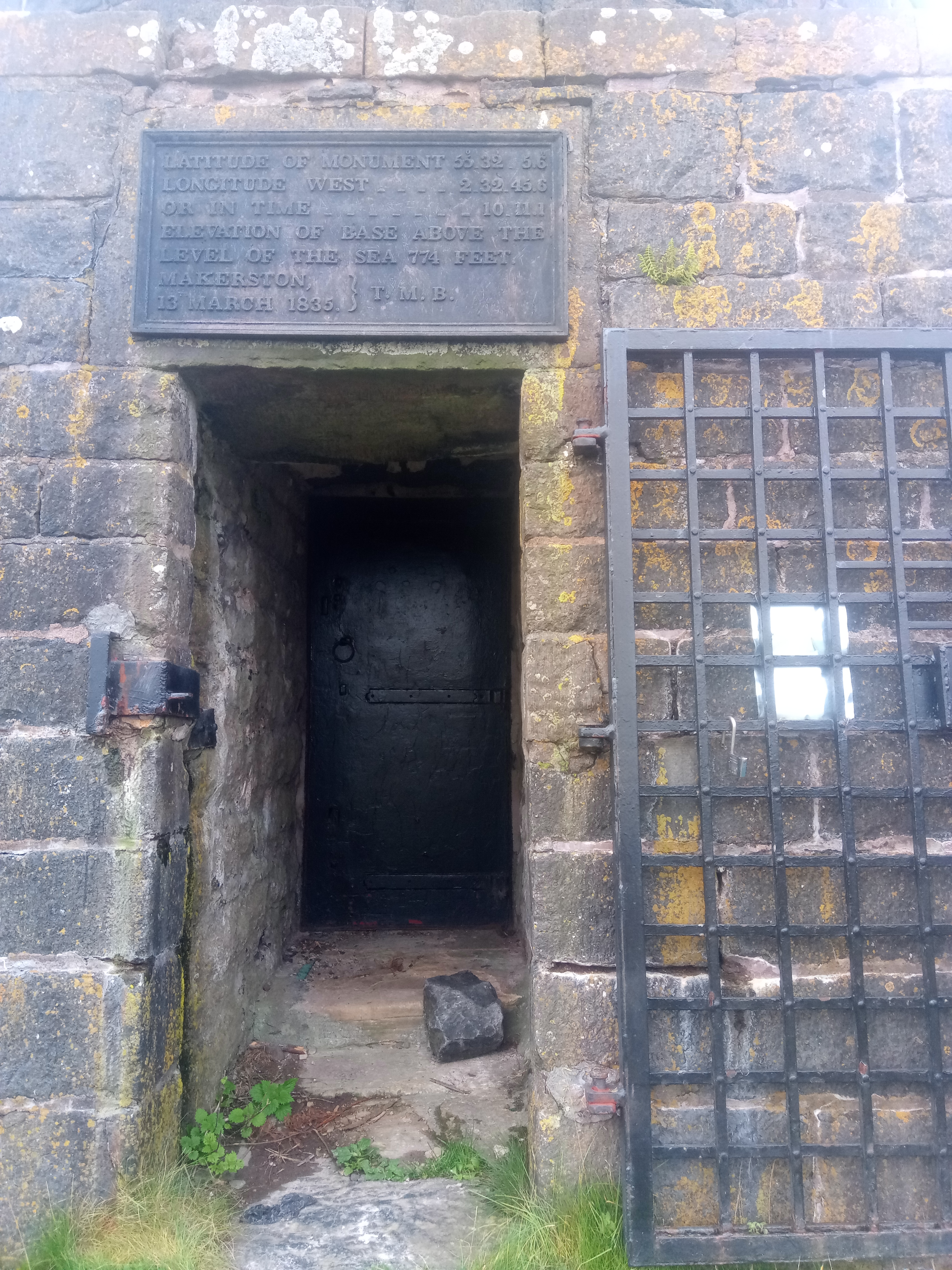
The entrance unlocked to the Waterloo Monument

On 1 May 2011, a temporary zip wire was erected at the monument as part of a fundraising event for the Anthony Nolan charity. The zip wire, built by Vertical Events, is believed to be the longest ever set up in the UK and was 1,500 feet (460 m) long.

The monument underwent some renovation in May and June 2018 and was out-of-bounds for access.

== See also ==
- List of places in the Scottish Borders
- List of places in Scotland
