= Mary Stewart (daughter of Robert III) =

Scottish princess (1380–1460)

- Countess of Angus
- Born: c. 1380
- Died: c. 1460 (aged c. 80)
- Burial: Strathblane, Scotland
- Spouse: George Douglas, 1st Earl of Angus; James Kennedy of Dunure; William Graham of Kincardine; William Edmonstone of Duntreath
- Issue: William Douglas, 2nd Earl of Angus; John Kennedy; Gilbert Kennedy, 1st Lord Kennedy; James Kennedy, Bishop of St. Andrews
- House: Stewart
- Father: Robert III of Scotland
- Mother: Annabella Drummond

Mary Stewart (c. 1380 – c. 1460) was a Scottish princess. The third daughter of King Robert III and his wife, Annabella Drummond, she was married four times, most notably to George Douglas, 1st Earl of Angus, with whom she was the progenitor of the so-called Red Douglas bloodline of the Douglas family.

== Life ==
Mary was born in c. 1380, the third daughter and fourth child of John Stewart, Earl of Carrick, heir to the Scottish throne, and his wife, Annabella Drummond. The exact year of Mary's birth is unknown. She had not yet been born in 1378, while her first child was born in 1398, suggesting a birth date of c. 1380. Mary's father succeeded her grandfather, Robert II, as King of Scots in 1390, taking the regnal name of Robert III.

On 24 May 1397, Mary was betrothed to George Douglas, Lord of Angus, at a meeting in Edinburgh between Robert III and George's mother, Margaret, Countess of Angus. The marriage, which was concluded during the summer of 1397, was likely supported by Mary's influential elder brother, David, Earl of Carrick, and her father. Shortly after Mary's marriage, her father recognized her husband's title as Earl of Angus. George was captured at the Battle of Homildon Hill in 1402, and died in England soon afterwards, possibly during an outbreak of bubonic plague. Mary was left as a widow with a young son, William, who succeeded his father as Earl of Angus.

In 1405, Mary married James Kennedy of Dunure, a prominent landowner in the earldom of Carrick. The marriage had political undertones, as Kennedy was influential in Carrick, where Mary's younger brother James had recently been created earl. The couple had certainly been married by January 1406. Mary and James Kennedy had three sons, John, Gilbert, and James, before her second husband was murdered in 1408. As Kennedy's widow, Mary became entitled to a portion of his lands in Carrick, which were valued at £6 in annual income from rents. In 1409, a papal dispensation was given for Mary to marry William Cunningham of Kilmaurs, but the marriage does not appear to have occurred.

Mary married her third husband, William Graham of Kincardine, probably in 1413. Mary had five sons with Graham before the latter died in 1424. In 1425, Mary married her fourth husband, William Edmonstone of Duntreath, with whom she had two children. Mary probably visited the court of her brother, James I, alongside Edmonstone in 1429 to plead for the rights of her eldest son by her second marriage, John Kennedy, to inherit his father's lands in Carrick. Despite Mary's intervention, her son clashed with the king over royal claims to Carrick and was forfeited in 1431.

After the assassination of her brother in 1437, Mary's son by her first marriage, William Douglas, 2nd Earl of Angus, played a key role in the arrest of the conspirators. William died in October 1437 and was succeeded as Earl of Angus by his eldest son, Mary's grandson James. After James' death in 1446, he was succeeded by his younger brother, Mary's other grandson George. Meanwhile, Mary's youngest son by her second marriage, James Kennedy, was elected as Bishop of St. Andrews in 1440, probably with the support of Mary's sister-in-law, Joan Beaufort.

Little is known about Mary's later years. In 1452, her nephew, James II, confirmed her and her fourth husband in their Duntreath lands, near Blanefield. By this time, Mary had become the last surviving child of Robert III after the death of her elder sister, Margaret. Mary was still alive in 1458, when James II granted her lands in Carrick. The date of Mary's death is unknown. Payments were made in her name from the Scottish exchequer as late as 1461. According to the later historian David Hume of Godscroft, Mary's grandson, George, Earl of Angus, used his royal descent to claim the right to crown Mary's great-nephew, James III, at Kelso Abbey in 1460. Mary was buried at Strathblane.
