= Margaret, Countess of Mar =

Scottish earl

Margaret of Mar
- The Countess of Mar
- Tenure: 1374–1391
- Predecessor: Thomas, Earl of Mar
- Successor: Isabel Douglas, Countess of Mar
- Died: c. 1391
- Spouse: William Douglas, 1st Earl of Douglas (died 1384)
- Issue: James Douglas, 2nd Earl of Douglas; Isabel Douglas, Countess of Mar
- Father: Domhnall II, Earl of Mar
- Mother: Isabella Stewart

Margaret of Mar (died c. 1391) was Countess of Mar, an ancient earldom in Scotland, in her own right.

== Life ==
She was a daughter of Domhnall II of Mar and became Countess of Mar in her own right after the death of her brother Thomas, 9th Earl of Mar. She had married William Douglas, 1st Earl of Douglas, who was styled Earl of Mar by right of his wife, and who was succeeded by their son, James Douglas, 2nd Earl of Douglas and Earl of Mar and Garioch in right of his mother. He was killed in 1388, leading the Scots at the Battle of Otterburn.

Margaret was succeeded by her daughter, Isabel, who became Countess of Mar, possessed the Lordship of the Garioch, and also became the Countess of the unentailed lands of the House of Douglas.

Preceded by Thomas	Countess of Mar; 1374–1391	Succeeded by Isabella
