= Thomas, Earl of Mar =

14th Century Earl of Mar

Thomas
- Earl of Mar
- Tenure: 1332–1377
- Predecessor: Domhnall II, Earl of Mar
- Successor: Margaret, Countess of Mar
- Born: c. 1330
- Died: 1377 (aged 46–47)
- Spouses: Margaret Graham, Countess of Menteith; Margaret Stewart, Countess of Angus
- Father: Domhnall II, Earl of Mar
- Mother: Isabella Stewart

Thomas, Earl of Mar, (c. 1330–1377) was a 14th-century Earl of Mar, an earldom located in the County of Aberdeen, Scotland. He is sometimes styled Mormaer of Mar since mormaer was the Scottish Gaelic equivalent of the English word earl. Because the identification and numbering of the ancient earls of Mar is debatable, Thomas is variously numbered the ninth, tenth, or thirteenth. of the ancient earls. He was a son of Domhnall II of Mar, who fell at the Battle of Dupplin Moor in 1332.

== Life ==
Since Thomas was still in his minority at the time of his father's death: Domhall, King Edward III of England, with whom Scotland was battling in the Scottish Wars of Independence, placed Thomas in the care of his (Thomas's) step-father, William Carsewell. He was prevented from receiving the earldom by Richard Talbot, 2nd Baron Talbot, who claimed the title Lord of Mar in the right of his wife, Elizabeth de Comyn. In the tumultuous years that followed Dupplin Moor, Thomas's grandmother, Lady Christina Bruce, held the seat of the earls of Mar, Kildrummy Castle. When she died in 1357, the castle passed to Thomas along with her lands and lordship, which were called the Earldom of Garioch.

In 1351, Thomas was one of the ambassadors sent to England to negotiate the ransom of Scotland's king, David II, who was prisoner there. When David was eventually released in 1357, Thomas was one of the seven lords "from whom three were to be selected as hostages" until the king's ransom was paid. As Earl of Mar (as he was styled in 1357), Thomas was made Great Chamberlain of Scotland in 1358. Thomas is said to have favored England's king, Edward III, inasmuch as the English king had granted him a pension of 600 merks per annum. In addition, the English king agreed to pay Thomas £600 sterling yearly if he lost his lands in Scotland. Thomas agreed to serve the English king by fighting in England's war with France in 1360. In 1362, he was sent as a Scottish ambassador to negotiate with England, and in 1369 he was one of the guarantees of a truce between the two nations.

Earl Thomas was in both England and France frequently in his life, as John Mackintosh has laid out in his book Historic Earls and Earldoms of Scotland:

In March 1359, he had a passport through England for himself and thirty persons in his retinue, and three merchants; while in August 1359, he had a safe conduct for himself and one hundred horsemen in his train. The same year, in October, he had a passport to France with twenty-four horsemen. In November 1362, he had a safe conduct to the shrine of St. Thomas a Becket at Canterbury for himself and twelve horsemen. He had passports for himself and twelve horsemen in February 1363, in March the same year, and in February 1365. In July 1365, he had a licence to send eight horsemen to Newcastle-on-Tyne with one hundred and twenty oxen, which he had sold to merchants in that city. In October 1368, he had a passport for himself and twelve gentlemen on their way through England in pilgrimage to St. [John of] Amiens, in France.

In 1363, he fell out of favor with David II, perhaps due to David's resentment of Thomas's alliance with the English or perhaps because of the extortions Thomas was alleged to have committed on his people. For whatever reason, David besieged and took his Castle of Kildrummy. However, in 1368, upon payment of a composition, Thomas received it back and was restored to the king's good favor.

== Marriages ==
Thomas married twice. His first wife was Margaret Graham of Menteith, whom he divorced because they had no children or, as one old chronicler put it, "at the instigation of the Devil". His second wife was Margaret Stewart, Countess of Angus, but this marriage produced no children either.

== Death and Burial ==
Thomas died childless, some say in 1374, others in 1377, the confusion arising from the fact that his brother-in-law was already claiming the title Earl of Mar in 1374. However, some scholars argue that Earl Thomas must have died in early 1377 because of a charter dated 10 August of that year, in which Douglas confirmed a charter previously made by Thomas.

Thomas of Mar was the last of the Celtic earls of Mar, and was buried within the walls of Kildrummy Castle. He was succeeded by his sister Margaret, through whom the title Earl of Mar did indeed pass to her husband, William Douglas, 1st Earl of Douglas.

Preceded by Domhnall II	Earl of Mar; 1332–1377	Succeeded by Margaret m. William of Douglas
