= Timpendean Tower =

Castle in Scottish Borders, Scotland

Coordinates: 55.4963°N 2.5784°W

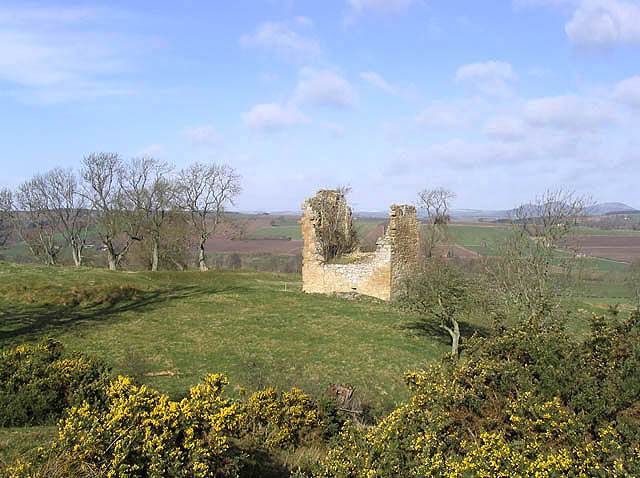

Timpendean Tower (tim-pen-deen) or Typenden Castle as it was once known, is a ruined 15th-century tower house near Lanton, around 1.5 miles (2.4 km) north-west of Jedburgh in the Scottish Borders.

== History ==
It is built on rising ground between the River Teviot and the Jed Water. It is a simple tower structure measuring 29 feet by 24 feet with 4-foot-thick (1.2 m) walls. It was a stronghold of the Douglas family and is now a scheduled monument.

The land here, once part of the Bonjedward estate, was long owned by the Douglases, passing from father to son, until it was sold off by George, 12th of Timpendean in 1843 to the Scott family, farmers of Bonjedward. Timpendean Tower was burned by the Earl of Hertford's men in 1545, during the War of the Rough Wooing.

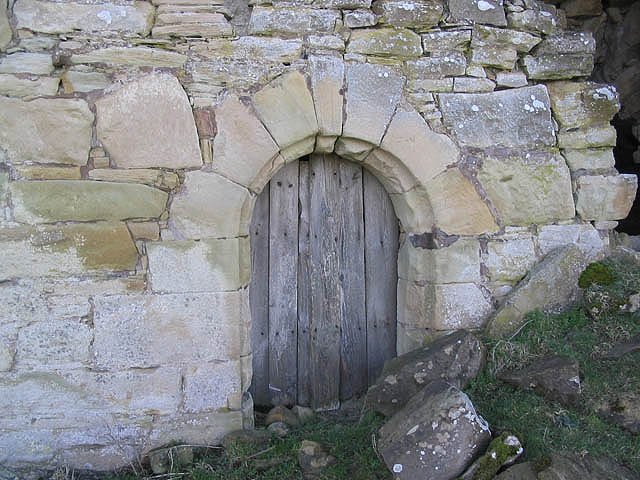
Timpendean Tower entrance

The tower, which is surrounded by much older earthworks, consisted of three floors and a vaulted cellar. There is evidence of a previous addition, which has now disappeared, judging by projecting bond stones on two walls. The east door and basement fireplace are later additions to the original house.

The first floor contained the great hall while the second floor consisted of sleeping quarters. Those floors were reached by a circular staircase on the east wall. Part of the nearby earthworks was dammed and filled with water for defensive purposes.

== See also ==
- List of places in the Scottish Borders
- List of places in Scotland
- Scheduled monuments in the Scottish Borders

== Reference and further reading ==
- MacGibbon, David; Ross, Thomas (1887). The Castellated and Domestic Architecture of Scotland: from the 12th to 18th century. Edinburgh: Douglas.
