= William Douglas (painter, born 1780) =

Scottish miniature and portrait painter (1780–1832)

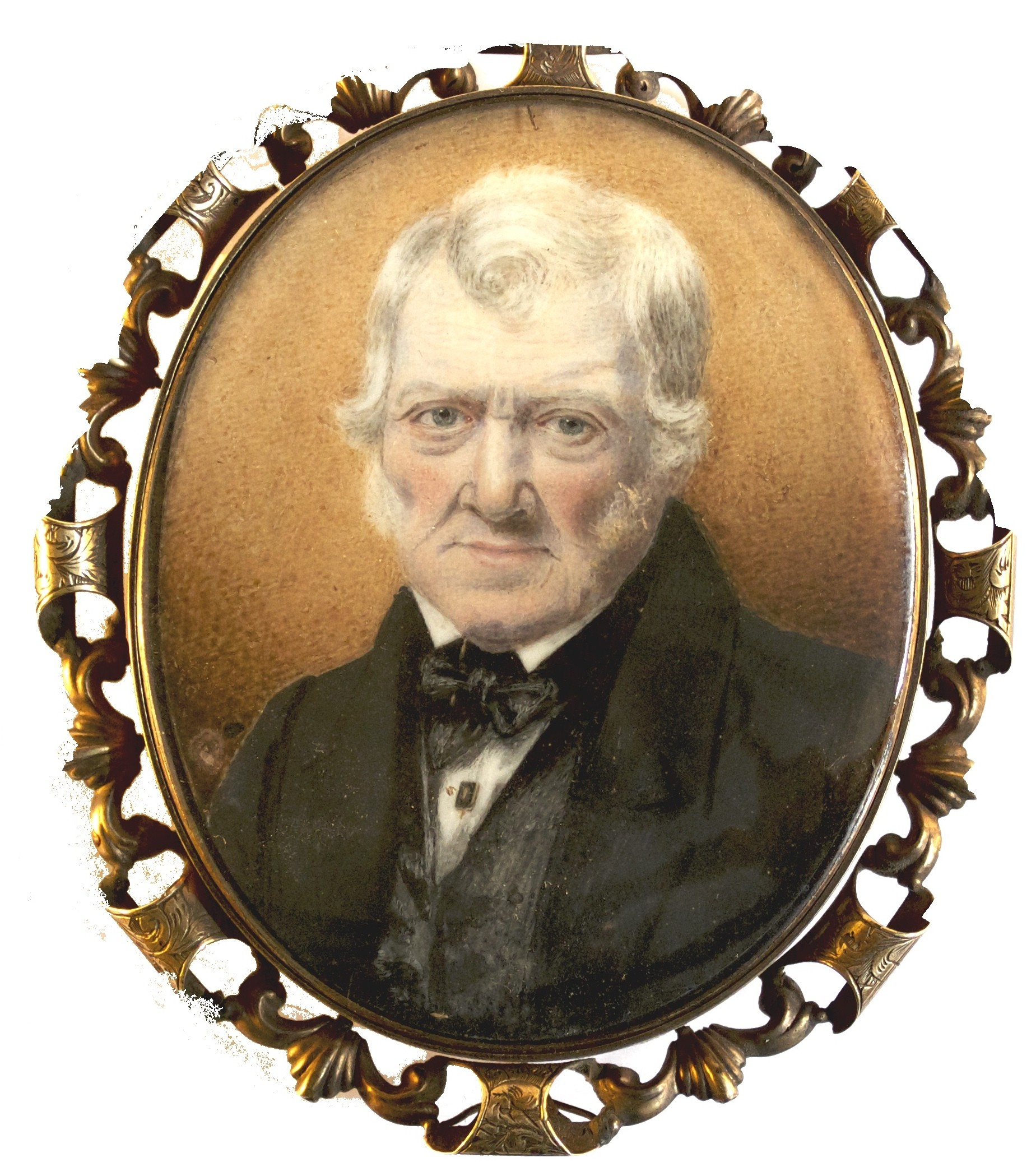
William Douglas, portrait miniature by the artist's daughter (1844)

William Douglas (1780–1832) was a Scottish miniature painter.

== Life ==
William Douglas, a descendant of the family of Douglas of Glenbervie, was born in Fifeshire on 14 April 1780. He received a liberal education, and very early showed a taste for the fine arts and the beauties of nature. This led to his being placed as an apprentice to Robert Scott the engraver at Edinburgh, John Burnet the engraver being one of his fellow-apprentices. Though he had skill as a landscape-painter, he adopted the profession of a miniature-painter, and gained considerable success, not only in Scotland, but in England. He was one of the associated artists who exhibited in Edinburgh from 1808 to 1816, and contributed to their exhibitions numerous miniatures, landscapes, and animal-pieces. He had numerous patrons, especially the Duke of Buccleuch and his family, and on 9 July 1817 he was appointed miniature-painter to Princess Charlotte and Prince Leopold of Saxe-Coburg. His miniatures were much esteemed for their tasteful and delicate execution. Some of these were exhibited by him at the Royal Academy in London in 1818, 1819, 1826, including a portrait of Lieutenant-general Sir John Hope.

Douglas died at his residence in Hart Street, Edinburgh, 30 January 1832, leaving a widow, one son, and two daughters. His eldest daughter, Miss Archibald Ramsay Douglas, also practised as a miniature painter. She exhibited at the Royal Academy in London in 1834, 1836, 1841, and died in Hart Street, Edinburgh, on 25 December 1886.

== Gallery ==
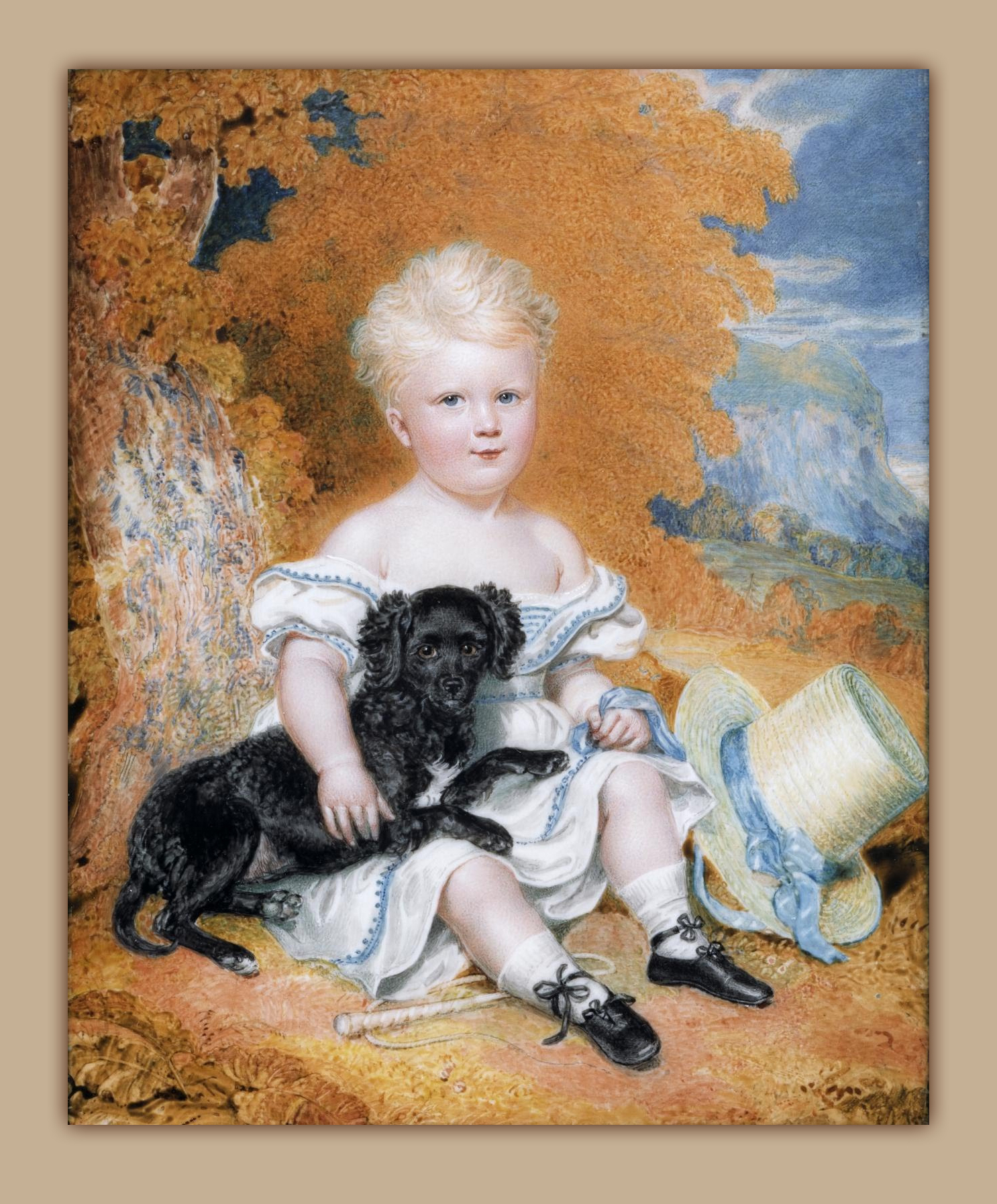
Portrait of a Child (1815–1825)

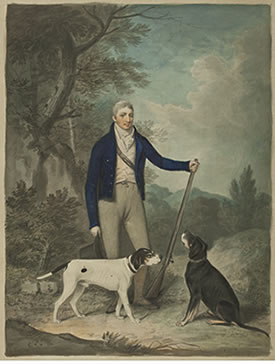
George Ramsay, 9th Earl of Dalhousie (c. 1816)

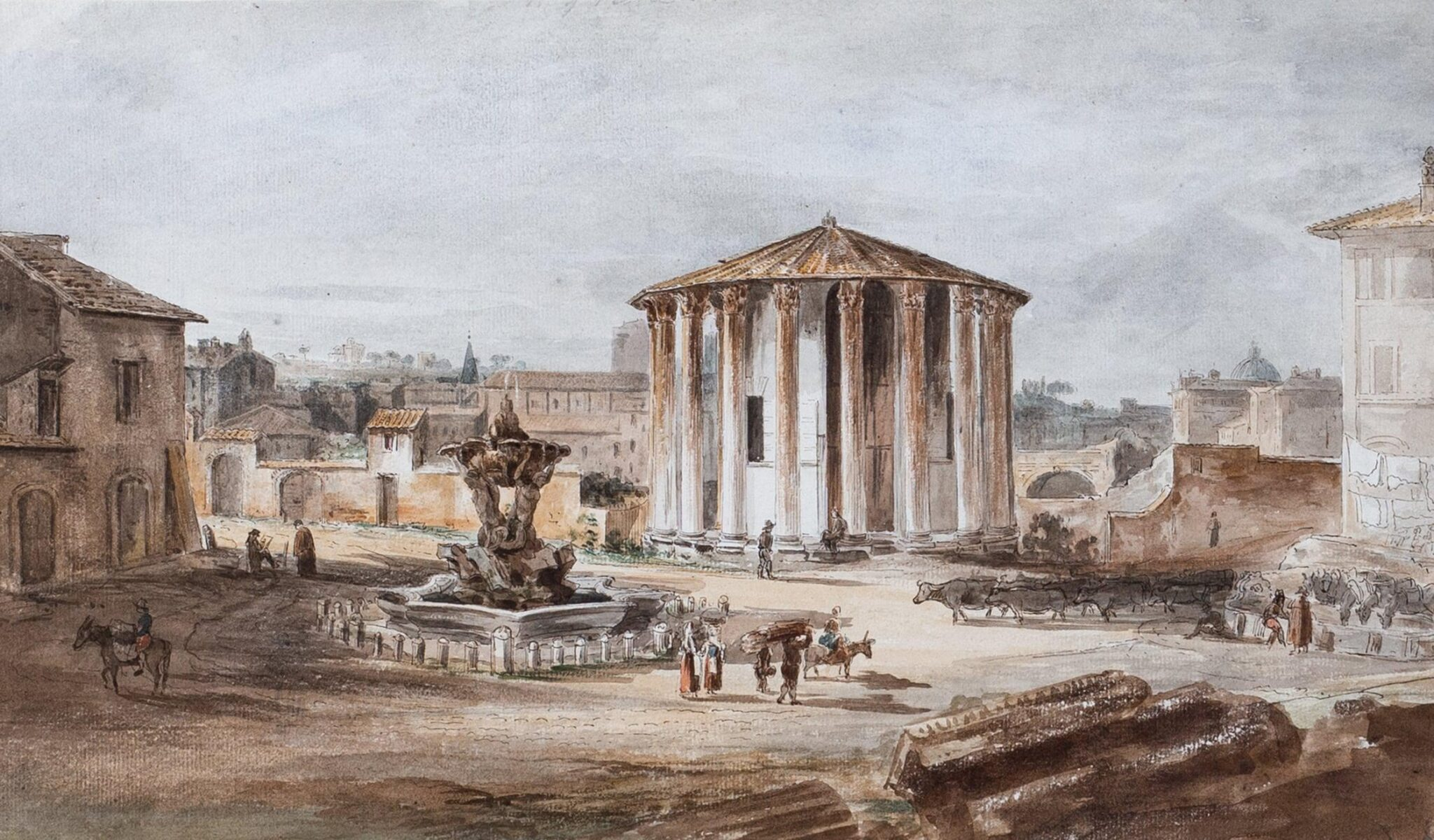
Rome, the Temple of Hercules Victor (c. 1817)

== Sources ==
- Anderson, William (1842). "Douglas, William". The Popular Scottish Biography. Edinburgh: A. Fullarton & Co. pp. 256–257.
- ——— (1872). "Douglas, William". The Scottish Nation. Vol. 2. Edinburgh: A. Fullarton & Co. pp. 59–60.
- Oliver, Valerie Cassel, ed. (2011). "Douglas, William". Benezit Dictionary of Artists. Oxford University Press. Retrieved 16 September 2022.
- Remington, V. (2004). "Douglas, William [W. D.] (1780–1832), miniature and portrait painter". Oxford Dictionary of National Biography. Oxford University Press. Retrieved 16 September 2022.

Attribution:

- This article incorporates text from a publication now in the public domain: Cust, Lionel Henry (1888). "Douglas, William (1780-1832)". In Stephen, Leslie (ed.). Dictionary of National Biography. Vol. 15. London: Smith, Elder & Co. pp. 374–375.
