= Lanton, Scottish Borders =

Village in Scottish Borders, Scotland

Coordinates: 55°29′N 2°36′W

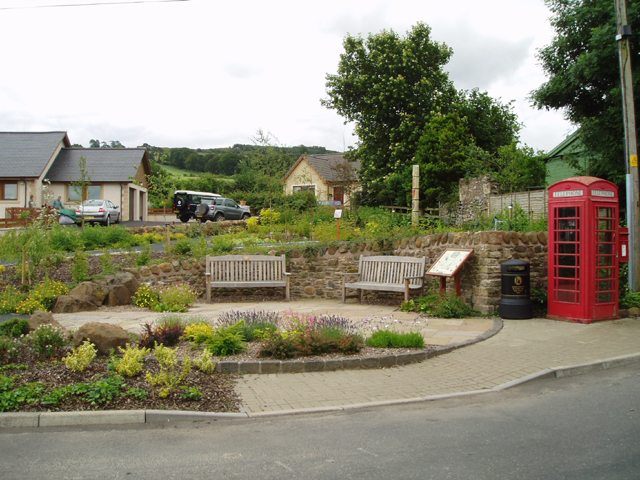
Lanton in 2006

Lanton is a village in the Scottish Borders area of Scotland, near Jedburgh and Timpendean Tower, off the A698.

== See also ==
- List of places in the Scottish Borders
