= Sir William Douglas (1801 ship) =

UK slave ship (1801–1803)

History

United Kingdom
- Name: Sir William Douglas
- Acquired: 1801
- Captured: 1803

General characteristics
- Tons burthen: 258, or 259 (bm)
- Sail plan: Brig or Ship-rigged
- Complement: 24
- Armament: Letter of Marque: 16 × 6&9-pounder guns; Lloyd's Register (1801): 2 × 9-pounder + 14 × 6-pounder guns; Register of Shipping (1802): 14 × 6-pounder guns + 2 × 12-pounder carronades

Sir William Douglas was a slave ship in the triangular trade in enslaved people, acquired by British interests in 1801. She made one complete voyage transporting enslaved people and was captured in 1803 after having delivered captives on her second voyage.

== Career ==
There is some ambiguity about Sir William Douglas's origins. Lloyd's Register (LR) reported that she was launched in 1800 in San Sebastian. The Register of Shipping (RS) gave her origin as a Spanish prize taken in 1800. The Trans-Atlantic Slave Trade database reports that she was built in 1799 at Ramsgate.

Year	Master	Owner	Trade	Source
1801	W.Shaw	Caldcleugh	London–Africa	LR
1802	W.Hanny	Boyd & Co.	London–Africa	RS

Although the Trans-Atlantic Slave Trade database has no data on the number of captives that Sir William Douglas carried on her two voyages, she does appear, as ship and brig, on a list of vessels that brought captives to the United States during the period 1790–1810.

1st voyage transporting enslaved people (1801–1802): Captain William Hannay acquired a letter of marque on 22 August 1801. He sailed from London on 5 September, bound for Africa. In 1801, 147 vessels sailed from British ports on voyages to transport enslaved people; 23 of these vessels sailed from London.

In February 1802, Lloyd's List reported that Sir William Douglas, Shaw, master, had arrived at Bonny. In April she arrived at Charleston. Lloyd's List reported in June that Sir William Douglas was off Charleston. She arrived back at London on 13 July.

2nd voyage transporting enslaved people (1803-Loss): Sir William Douglas had arrived back at London during the Peace of Amiens and when Captain J. Mayers sailed from London on 5 February 1803, the Peace was still in place. Consequently, Mayers did not acquire a letter of marque. In 1801, 99 vessels sailed from British ports on voyages to transport enslaved people; 15 of these vessels sailed from London.

Lloyd's List reported in November that William Douglas, Shaw, master, was off Barbados, bound for Charleston. She arrived at Savannah in October and landed her captives there.

== Fate ==
In January 1804 Lloyd's List reported that Sir William Douglas had been taken on her way to London and that her captain had arrived at Bordeaux.

In 1803, 11 British vessels and in 1804, 30 were lost while on voyages transporting enslaved people. In each year, at least one was lost on the homeward-bound leg of their voyages. During the period 1793 to 1807, war, rather than maritime hazards or resistance by the captives, was the greatest cause of vessel losses among British enslaving vessels.
