= Domhnall II, Earl of Mar =

14th-century Scottish nobleman

Domhnall II, Earl of Mar (date of birth unknown but prior to 1305 – 11 August 1332) was briefly Regent of Scotland during the minority of David II, King of Scotland.

Domhnall's father was Gartnait, Earl of Mar. His mother's identity is uncertain, although she seems to have been an elder daughter of Robert Bruce, Earl of Carrick.

He was taken prisoner by the English in 1306 while so young he was referred to as an 'infant' in the royal orders to keep him prisoner, however, because of his tender age he was treated very gently and eventually became part of the household of the Bishop of Bristol. He remained a prisoner until after the Battle of Bannockburn when he was released with the other Scottish prisoners but chose to remain in England. In 1322 he fought with the English against the Scots at the Battle of Old Byland.

It appears likely that he fought on the side of Edward II of England at the Battle of Boroughbridge in March 1322, as it is recorded that afterwards the Earl of Mar took Bartholomew de Badlesmere, who was one of Edward's captured opponents, to Canterbury.

He went over to the Scottish side after Edward II was deposed and led one of the three Scottish divisions at the Battle of Stanhope Park.

In 1332 the regent of Scotland, Thomas Randolph, 1st Earl of Moray, died. On 2 August Domhnall was elected as the new regent at a meeting of the Scottish nobles at Perth. Following the invasion of Edward Balliol, with the support of Edward III of England, Mar led the Scots loyalists to confront them. He was defeated and killed at the Battle of Dupplin Moor, only nine days after his election as regent.

Through his marriage to Isabella Stewart, daughter of Sir Alexander Stewart of Bonkyll and Jean Fitz James, they had a son, Thomas of Mar, and a single daughter, Margaret of Mar, who succeeded her brother and became, in her turn, Countess of Mar.

Preceded by Gartnait	Mormaer of Mar; 1305–1332	Succeeded by Thomas
Preceded by Thomas Randolph, 1st Earl of Moray	Regent of Scotland; 2–11 August 1332	Succeeded by Sir Andrew Murray
