= William Douglas (footballer, born 1890) =

Scottish footballer

Personal information
- Full name: William Rutherford Douglas
- Date of birth: 9 August 1890
- Place of birth: Selkirk, Scotland
- Date of death: 12 November 1917 (aged 27)
- Place of death: Baghdad, Ottoman Iraq
- Position: Goalkeeper

Senior career*
Years	Team	Apps	(Gls)
1908–1909	Queen's Park	5	(0)
- * Club domestic league appearances and goals

William Rutherford Douglas (9 August 1890 – 12 November 1917) was a Scottish amateur footballer who played as a goalkeeper in the Scottish League for Queen's Park.

== Personal life ==
From 1906, Douglas worked for the Commercial Bank of Scotland and was appointed an accountant at the company's Biggar branch in March 1915. He served as a lance corporal in the King's Own Scottish Borderers and Army Ordnance Corps during the First World War and died of cholera in an isolation ward in Baghdad, Ottoman Iraq on 12 November 1917. Douglas was buried in Baghdad (North Gate) War Cemetery.

== Career statistics ==
Appearances and goals by club, season and competition
Club	Season	League			Scottish Cup		Other		Total	
Club	Season	Division	Apps	Goals	Apps	Goals	Apps	Goals	Apps	Goals
Queen's Park	1908–09	Scottish First Division	5	0	0	0	0	0	5	0
Career total			5	0	0	0	0	0	5	0
