= Alexander Stewart of Bonkyll =

Scottish nobleman

Arms of Alexander Stewart of Bonkyll: Gold, a fess chequy blue mid silver, surmounted by a red bend charged with three gold buckles.

Alexander Stewart of Bonkyll (c.1271 – 1319) was a Scottish nobleman. He was the eldest son of Sir John Stewart (d. 1298), and the father of John Stewart, 1st Earl of Angus.

== Family ==
Alexander was the first cousin of Walter the Steward, father of King Robert II of Scotland, and of Sir James Douglas, two of the most important commanders during the First War of Scottish Independence. He was also the brother-in-law of Thomas Randolph, 1st Earl of Moray, nephew of King Robert I of Scotland. His mother was Margaret de Bonkyl, the daughter of Sir Alexander de Bonkyl of that Ilk. Alexander's wife was Jean Fitz James [Jean's surname should be "fitz Alexander" as the custom was "fitz" (daughter of) or "Fitz" (son of) then the father's Christian name in this case "Alexander" hence "Jean fitz Alexander"], daughter of Alexander Fitz James, with whom he had two children, a son and heir, John Stewart, and a daughter, Isabella Stewart, who married Domhnall II, Earl of Mar.

== Life ==
His father had been one of the strongest supporters of the exiled John Balliol and was killed at the Battle of Falkirk. After the disaster at Falkirk William Wallace resigned as Guardian of Scotland and was replaced by John Comyn, nephew of the exiled Balliol. After Comyn achieved some notable success fighting against the English a quarrel broke out between Comyn and his rival Robert the Bruce over their competing rights to the throne. During a meeting between the two sides at Dumfries in 1306, Comyn was fatally stabbed by Bruce and his supporters and the War of Independence now became a civil war. Because of his father's long allegiance to King John, Alexander fought under John MacDougall of Lorn against Bruce but was captured by his cousin James Douglas in 1308 and was given a royal pardon. He died circa 1319.

== See also ==
- Bonkyl Kirk
