= William Douglas of Drumlanrig =

Scottish nobleman

Sir William Douglas, 1st of Drumlanrig (c. 1378 – c. 1421) was the illegitimate son of James Douglas, 2nd Earl of Douglas.

Arms of the House Douglas of Drumlanrig

== Early life ==
He was granted the Barony of Drumlanrig by his father in the 1380s. By the age of about 20 he had been knighted, and in October 1405 he was granted safe conduct by Henry IV of England to attend a tournament in London.

He spent the next few years 'constantly passing to England, either as a commissioner for truce, as a hostage, or on diplomatic business'. Possibly in recognition of his role as hostage on his behalf, he was granted the Barony of Hawick by his cousin Archibald, 4th Earl of Douglas, in 1407. In 1412 he was back in Henry IV's Court to negotiate the release of James I of Scotland, who had been captured by the English when a boy 10 years earlier.

== Career in France and death ==
The Douglas family had built its reputation on border warfare with the English, but this conflict had declined from the 1380s. Instead, the war between France and England on the continent offered opportunities for military glory. At the invitation of the French Dauphin Charles, Drumlanrig brought a company of 450 men to France in the fight alongside the French forces against the English.

In 1420 he led a Scots force to defeat at Fresnay, where he lost his banner to the English forces. He was present during the victory against the English at the Battle of Baugé in 1421, but he probably died that same year whilst in France. (The later date of 1427, often presented as his year of death on genealogy websites, was instead the year his son was 'retoured' to his father, that is confirmed as his heir, when it was noted his father had died six years earlier).

== Marriage and issue ==
He had one son, William Douglas, 2nd of Drumlanrig, and a daughter, Marion Douglas (born c.1402), who married Robert de Chisholm.

There are various versions about who William Douglas married. Whilst most sources suggest he married Elizabeth Stewart of Durisdeer, other sources suggest he subsequently married Jean Murray (c1402) and after her death, Jacoba Douglas (c1410).

Percy Adams, writing in 1921, omits any reference to Elizabeth and names only the two other women as his wives. He posits Jean Murray as the mother of his heir, William, 2nd Lord Drumlanrig.

== In fiction ==
Sir William Douglas of Drumlanrig has a small role to play in the historical novel 'Lion Let Loose' (1967) by Nigel Tranter. His role to negotiate the release of the captured James I of Scotland is noted, whilst he eventually speaks to the King when fighting on opposing sides in France in 1420. The novelist describes him as a 'big, forceful red-headed bull of a man' who has this to say to the semi-captive King James:

Think you we were ever fighting for France? ... We fight for Scotland only. We'd liefer fight the English here, in France, than on our own Scots soil! That's the whole of it.
