= William Douglas, 1st Earl of Douglas =

Scottish noble (c. 1323–1384)

William Douglas
- Earl of Douglas
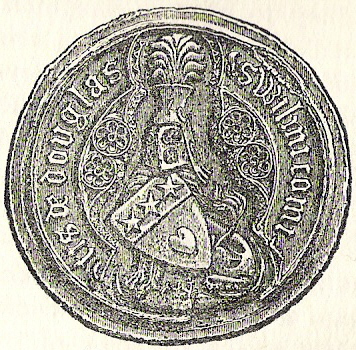
- Seal of William Douglas, 1st Earl of Douglas.
- Tenure: 26 January 1358 – 1 May 1384
- Predecessor: New Creation
- Successor: James Douglas, 2nd Earl of Douglas
- Other titles: Earl of Mar; Lord of Liddesdale
- Born: c. 1323; Douglas, Lanarkshire, Scotland
- Died: 1 May 1384 (aged 60–61); Douglas, Lanarkshire, Scotland
- Buried: 1384; Melrose Abbey
- Residence: Hermitage Castle; Tantallon Castle
- Noble family: Clan Douglas
- Spouse: Margaret, Countess of Mar
- Issue: James Douglas, 2nd Earl of Douglas; Isabel Douglas, Countess of Mar; George Douglas, 1st Earl of Angus (illegitimate); Lady Margaret Douglas (illegitimate)
- Parents: Sir Archibald Douglas; Beatrice de Lindsay

William Douglas, 1st Earl of Douglas (c. 1323 – 1 May 1384) was a Scottish nobleman, peer, magnate, and head of the Black Douglas family. Under his leadership, the Black Douglases continued their climb to pre-eminence in Scottish politics begun under his uncle, Sir James the Good, as well as their military dominance of the south of Scotland.

== Early life ==
William Douglas was the son of Sir Archibald Douglas (died 1333) and Beatrice de Lindsay, the daughter of Sir Alexander de Lindsay of Crawford, South Lanarkshire. He was the nephew of "Sir James the Good", the trusted deputy of King Robert I of Scotland. From the time of his father's death at the Battle of Halidon Hill, Douglas is described as being a ward of his kinsman and godfather, William Douglas, Knight of Liddesdale, and was educated in France. In 1342, under pressure from Liddesdale, his uncle Hugh the Dull resigned the Lordship of Douglas to him, though Liddesdale rapaciously administered his estates while it was in his ward-ship, and assumed direct ownership of some of the Douglas territories.

Douglas returned to Scotland in 1348 and immediately started to put his house in order. In 1346-47 following the Battle of Neville's Cross, King David II, and other nobility, including Liddesdale, were held captive by the English. Edward Baliol used the opportunity to ravage the whole of the south of Scotland. After his return, Douglas gathered his men and drove the English out from his ancestral lands of Douglasdale. Douglas went in the style of his uncle, the Good Sir James, and for the following few years waged a guerrilla war against the English in the Ettrick Forest and Jedforests.

Douglas next became one of the commissioners to negotiate with the English for the release of David II of Scotland.

== Death of the Knight of Liddesdale ==
In 1353, Edward Baliol was ensconced at Buittle in his ancestral territories in Galloway. Douglas led a raid there to eject him due to Baliol's forfeiture of those lands that had been made over to Sir James Douglas in 1324. Following this raid, returning through the Forest, Douglas came across Liddesdale hunting on what Douglas viewed as his desmesne. This was the match that lit the fuse of years of resentment over Liddesdale's assumption of the Douglas patrimony, notwithstanding Liddesdale's murder of Sir Alexander Ramsay of Dalhousie which John of Fordun gives as a reason for the enmity between the men. Another more likely explanation for the killing was Liddesdale's treasonous agreement with the English to gain his own freedom from captivity. Liddesdale, once in high standing with the Crown, had fallen into disfavour following his murder of Ramsay and another Knight, Sir David de Barclay. Douglas set upon Liddesdale and killed him. In February 1354, William of Douglas received a new charter from King David bestowing all the lands held by his uncle Sir James, his father Sir Archibald, and Liddesdale itself.

== War with England and Battle of Poitiers ==
In 1355 the truce with England expired and Douglas with the Earl of Dunbar and March, whose lands had been ravaged, decided to attack Norham Castle in retaliation. One of Douglas' captains, Sir William Ramsay of Dalhousie, was instructed to despoil, ransack and ravage the lands around Norham and burn the town in an effort to entice the garrison out to battle. Ramsay did so and the English under the castle's constable, Sir Thomas Grey of Heaton and Lord Dacre, gave chase. Douglas and March, meanwhile were encamped seven miles away in woodland to the south of Duns, when Ramsay had reached them. The English pursuers were ambushed by the Scots force and completely overwhelmed. Following this Battle of Nesbit Moor, Douglas and March joined with the Earl of Angus along with French allies commanded by Sir Eugene de Garencieres took Berwick.

After taking the town of Berwick, they failed to take the castle and had to retire from there before the advancing army of Edward III. King Edward laid waste to the Lothians in an event that would be known as the "Burnt Candlemas". His supply lines were overstretched. English supply ships were lost in a storm. The Scots' scorched earth policy prevented raiding for supplies, and Edward had to turn homewards, but not before being ambushed and nearly taken by Lord Douglas's men outside Melrose. Following Edward's retreat into England, Douglas arranged a truce with William de Bohun, 1st Earl of Northampton that would last until Michaelmas.

He also arranged a Safe conduct to visit the captive King David. Following this, Douglas crossed with a large following to France and took up arms with Jean le Bon against Edward of Woodstock, the Black Prince. Douglas was present at the Battle of Poitiers where he was knighted by the French King. Douglas fought in the King's own Battle, but when the fight seemed over Douglas was dragged by his men from the melee. Froissart states that "... the Earl Douglas of Scotland, who fought a season valiantly, but when he saw the discomfiture he departed and saved himself; for in no wise would he be taken by the Englishmen, he would rather there be slain". After the defeat there Douglas escaped, but left a number of his men either slain or captive, including his first cousin latterly the 3rd Earl of Douglas, Archibald the Grim.

Douglas returned to Scotland by mid-autumn, and was involved in peace negotiations with the English; one aspect of the treaty was the creation of March Wardens, of which Douglas was one. Under the auspice of this office, Douglas seized Hermitage Castle in Liddesdale from the English in response to their depredations on Eskdale. Douglas was part of the parliament that met at Berwick in 1357, which finalised the release of King David through the Treaty of Berwick, Douglas himself being one of the securities for his release.

== Earl of Douglas and Mar ==
Douglas was created Earl of Douglas on 26 January 1358. To reflect his new-found status, he built Tantallon Castle, a medieval castle surrounded by a curtain wall. The castle became the home of Douglas' sister-in-law and mistress, Margaret Stewart, 3rd Countess of Angus, the mother of his illegitimate son, George Douglas, who would later be created Earl of Angus by the right of his mother.

In 1364, Douglas joined King David II in seeking a treaty with England that would have written off Scotland's debt to England in return for depriving his nephew, Robert the Steward, formerly an ally of Douglas, of the succession. King Edward III's son, Lionel of Antwerp, would have taken the Scottish throne, although the independence of Scotland was to be guaranteed, and a special clause was to be provided for the restoration of the English estates of the Douglas family.

The plan never succeeded, and on the accession of Robert the Steward as King Robert II, Douglas was nevertheless reconciled and appointed Justiciar South of the Forth in 1372. The last years of Douglas' life were spent in making and repelling border raids. He died at Douglas, South Lanarkshire, on 1 May 1384.

== Marriage and issue ==
William Douglas married in 1357, Margaret of Mar, the daughter of Domhnall II, Earl of Mar and Isabella Stewart, who succeeded her brother Thomas as Countess of Mar. They had two children:

- James Douglas, 2nd Earl of Douglas (1358–1388)
- Lady Isabel Douglas, Countess of Mar (1360–1408)

The Earl of Douglas also fathered two illegitimate children by Margaret Stewart, the widow of Thomas, Earl of Mar, who had been Douglas's brother-in-law. She was also Countess of Angus in her own right:

- George Douglas (1380–1403), who inherited the estates of Angus and was later created Earl of Angus, being the heir of his mother.
- Lady Margaret Douglas, who received in 1404, the lands of Bonjedward from her half-sister, Lady Isabel Douglas.

He is also said to have been the father of another illegitimate daughter, Joan Douglas, who married William Dacre, 5th Baron Dacre.

== In literature ==
William Douglas is one of the characters in The Road to Poitiers by Jonathan Lunn.

Peerage of Scotland
New creation	Earl of Douglas; 1358–1384	Succeeded by James Douglas
Preceded by Margaret Douglas	Earl of Mar jure uxoris 1374–1384	Succeeded by James Douglas
Baronage of Scotland
Preceded by Hugh the Dull, Lord of Douglas	Lord of Douglas; 1342–1384	Succeeded by James Douglas
