= Isabel Douglas, Countess of Mar =

14th-century Scottish countess

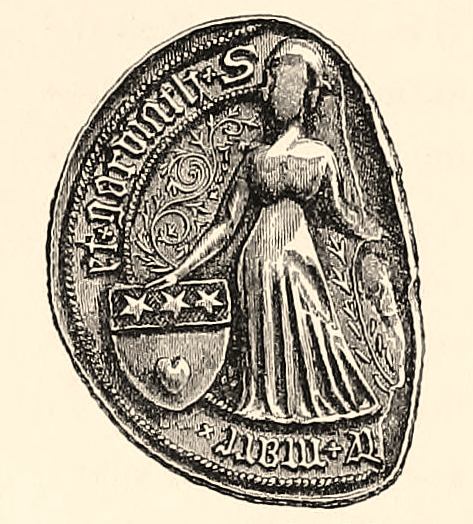
Fragmentary seal of Countess Isabel

Isabel Douglas, Countess of Mar (c. 1360 – 1408) was Countess of Mar.

== Life ==
Isabel was the sister of the famous James 2nd Earl of Douglas and Earl of Mar, who died leading the Scots to victory at the Battle of Otterburn, and daughter of William Douglas, 1st Earl of Douglas, and wife Margaret, Countess of Mar. He died without any legitimate children and his sister Isabel inherited considerable property, although of the Douglas lands which could only pass through the male line. After being confirmed as countess she then became the most sought after bride in the realm and soon was married in 1384 or before July 1388 to Sir Malcolm Drummond, who became Earl of Mar, born in 1351, brother-in-law of King Robert III, who acquired Cargill, Stobhall, Kinloch and other lands from his aunt, Queen Margaret Drummond, Justiciar of Scotia before 1400, brother of Anabella Drummond and son of Sir John Drummond of Stobhall (1318-1373), Thane of Lennox, Baillie of the Abthainy of Dull, who in February 1367 had a charter of his wife's lands, and wife Mary de Montifex or Montfichet (1325-?), eldest daughter and co-heiress of Sir William de Montifex or Montfichet of Auchterarder, of Stobhall and of Cargill, Justiciar of Scotia before 1328, paternal grandson of Sir Malcolm Drummond (aft. 1295-Battle of Neville's Cross, Durham, 17 October 1346), Thane of Lennox, and great-grandson of Sir Malcolm Drummond (aft. 1270-1325), Thane of Lennox, who fought in the Battle of Dunbar on 27 April 1296, where he was captured by the English, and in 1301 was again captured by the English, and in the Battle of Bannockburn in 1314, and wife ... de Graham, daughter of Sir Patrick de Graham, Lord of Kincardine, and wife Annabella of Strathearn. This marriage however failed to produce any children and the Countess soon became the focus of several plots to usurp her lands by scheming noblemen.

While the couple resided at the chief seat to the Earldom of Mar, Kildrummy Castle, Sir Malcolm was frequently away on royal business, being one of King Robert's close advisors. In 1402, while Sir Malcolm was away at one of his other castles, he was attacked by a large group of highlanders led by Alexander Stewart, illegitimate son of the Wolf of Badenoch. Alexander then proceeded to capture the castle and put Sir Malcolm into one of his dungeons where he soon died at the hands of his captor before 8 November 1402, murdered while confined to prison by clansman (allegedly under Alexander Stewart) after some dispute. Because the king was by this time sick and infirm and real power was in the hands of his younger brother the Duke of Albany, Isabel was now completely isolated and was now easy prey for her husband's murderer. In the summer of 1404, Alexander and his gang of highlanders descended on her castle of Kildrummy and captured it along with the Countess and was soon able to extort from her a signed document promising to marry Alexander and give over to him all of her lands, including the earldom of Mar and lordship of the Garioch. Under normal circumstances this incident possibly would not have been allowed to stand, but Isabel had the misfortune that these events took place during the regency of the Duke of Albany, who was in fact the uncle of this Alexander Stewart. Because his relation to the Royal Family and friendship with his uncle saved him from any actual punishment, Isabel was forced to marry the man who murdered her husband and live the last four years of her life as a captive. She died in the year 1408 without children. The earldom of Mar then reverted to the crown and was later given to John Erskine, 6th Lord Erskine, whose descendants hold it to this day.

== See also ==
- Margaret, Countess of Mar
- Alexander Stewart, Earl of Mar
- Earl of Mar

Peerage of Scotland
Preceded by James Douglas	Countess of Mar; 1391–1404	Succeeded by Alexander Stewart
