= Alexander Livingston of Callendar =

Scottish nobleman

- Justiciar of Scotland
- Born: c. 1375; Scotland
- Died: 1451 (aged c. 76); England
- Noble family: Livingston family
- Issue: James, 1st Lord Livingston
- Father: John Livingston of Callendar

Alexander Livingston of Callendar (c. 1375 - 1451) was a Scottish nobleman who played a significant political role during the minority of King James II. He served most notably as Justiciar of Scotland, and also acted as guardian to the king in his role as custodian of Stirling Castle. Livingston rose to power by imprisoning Joan Beaufort, Queen of Scots, James II's mother, in 1439, and enjoyed extensive prestige and influence in Scotland during the next decade. Livingston's alliance with the Douglas family, particularly William Douglas, 8th Earl of Douglas, contributed to a period of civil war in Scotland during the 1440s. Livingston's political power collapsed in 1449, with the executions of several of his influential relatives, leaving him in exile outside Scotland. Despite these circumstances, Livingston ultimately became the progenitor of the Earls of Linlithgow through his eldest son, James.

== Origins ==
Livingston was the eldest son of John Livingston of Callendar by his first wife, an unnamed daughter of John Menteith of Kerse. He was probably born in c. 1375, as he had three younger brothers, and his mother died before 15 August 1381. Livingston's father was killed at the Battle of Homildon Hill on 14 September 1402.

== Career ==
Livingston was a relatively minor figure for most of his life, enjoying local importance in Stirlingshire. His links with the powerful Douglas family had given him the office of bailie of Herbertshire Castle by 1423. Murdoch Stewart, Duke of Albany, as Governor of Scotland, probably gave Livingston custody of Stirling Castle before 1424. Despite his association with the duke's regime, Livingston survived the downfall of Albany and his family in 1425. He traveled to Durham, in the company of James Douglas of Balvenie and William Sinclair, Earl of Orkney, to meet James I of Scotland after the king's release from his eighteen-year captivity in England. After this display of loyalty, James I confirmed Livingston's position as custodian of Stirling. Livingston was a member of the jury that sat at Stirling on 27 May 1425, in order to condemn the Duke of Albany, the Earl of Lennox, and two of Albany's sons to death by beheading.

Livingston's career in royal service allowed his family to prosper during the early 1430s. His younger brother, John, became provost of Edinburgh, while his cousin, Robert Livingston, was employed by James I as master of works at Linlithgow Palace. Livingston and his family developed a close bond with William Crichton, a fellow royal servant and the custodian of Edinburgh Castle, during these years. After the assassination of James I in 1437, Livingston shifted his loyalties to James Douglas of Balvenie, who now became Earl of Avandale.

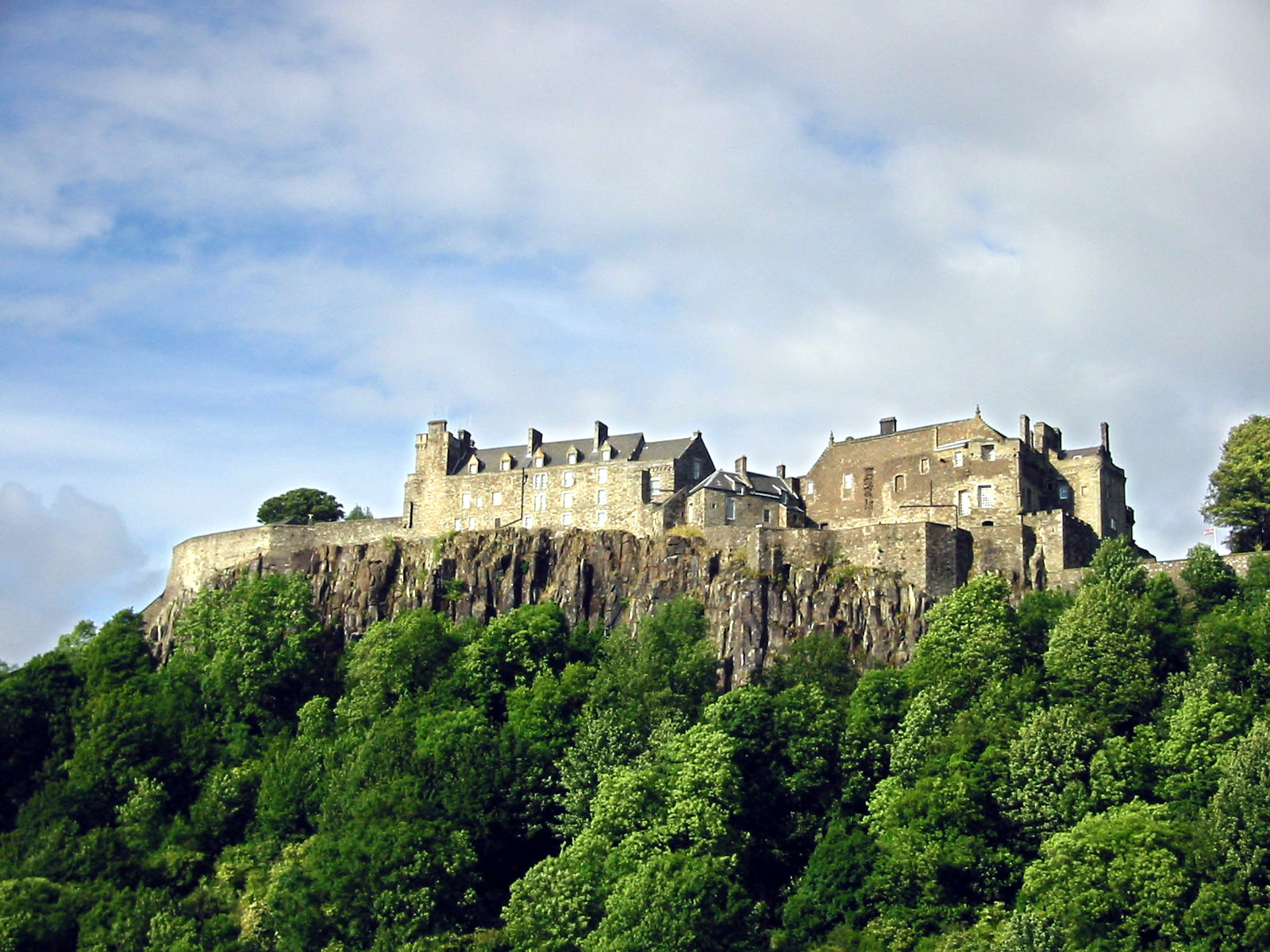
Livingston's control of Stirling Castle, pictured here, allowed him to seize custody of James II of Scotland in 1439.

=== Coup of 1439 ===
Livingston emerged as a major figure in Scottish history on 3 August 1439, aged c. 64, when he arrested Joan Beaufort, the queen mother, and her second husband, James Stewart of Lorn, at Stirling Castle, as part of a coup against the queen mother's regency government. According to the contemporary Auchinleck chronicle, Livingston ordered Joan to be imprisoned in a room in the castle, while Stewart of Lorn and his brother were shackled in a dungeon. Livingston received the support of various noblemen, including James Douglas, Earl of Avandale, and William Crichton, for his arrest of the queen mother and her husband. Joan's arrest ended her attempts to govern Scotland on behalf of her nine-year-old son, James II.

Livingston's coup against the queen mother culminated in a general council, held at Stirling the following month, that named him as guardian of James II for the duration of the king's legal minority. Livingston also gained custody of the king's sisters, all of whom were minors except for Margaret, the eldest. In a final humiliation, Joan was forced to surrender her annual pension of 4,000 merks to Livingston. A brief dispute ensued between Livingston and William Crichton, who had now become Lord Chancellor of Scotland, when Crichton seized James II from Livingston's custody during a hunting trip and took him to Edinburgh. Despite this setback, Livingston was able to negotiate with Crichton for the king's return to his custody. By the autumn of 1439, Livingston was serving on the regency council alongside Crichton, James Douglas, Earl of Avandale, and Avandale's great-nephew, William Douglas, 6th Earl of Douglas.

=== Black Dinner ===
Livingston was a participant in the infamous Black Dinner on 24 November 1440, when the Earl of Douglas, his brother, and their servant, Malcolm Fleming of Biggar, were arrested and executed at Edinburgh Castle. Livingston's political patron, the Earl of Avandale, took primary responsibility for arranging the executions, and inherited his great-nephew's earldom in the wake of the Black Dinner. Livingston was present in the castle with Crichton and William Sinclair, Earl of Orkney, on the evening of the Black Dinner.

The execution of Malcolm Fleming, a member of the Douglas affinity, at the Black Dinner was a particular source of controversy. Conflict ensued between Clan Fleming and the immediate family of Livingston's ally, William Crichton, who was considered to be most responsible for Fleming's death. Meanwhile, Crichton's relationship with the Douglas family deteriorated in the years following the Black Dinner. After the death of James Douglas, 7th Earl of Douglas, in March 1443, Livingston abandoned his political alliance with Crichton, instead seeking an accommodation with William, the new Earl of Douglas. In order to secure his new alliance with the earl, Livingston was forced to make peace with the Fleming family, whom he had antagonized at the Black Dinner. On 16 August 1443, he swore an oath in the presence of James Kennedy, Bishop of St Andrews, that he had not been responsible for the execution of Malcolm Fleming. Livingston's continued custody of James II made his support valuable for the new Earl of Douglas, who was now seeking to destroy the Crichton family.

=== Riding the tiger ===
Livingston's career in national politics approached its peak after August 1443. His new alliance with William Douglas, 8th Earl of Douglas, enabled the earl to capture Crichton's tower house at Barnton later that month. Livingston brought James II to the earl's siege of Barnton, convincing the tower's garrison to surrender. Livingston's new enemy, Crichton, and his relatives were then officially outlawed at a general council held at Stirling Castle. Livingston's support, entailing custody of James II, was crucial to the Earl of Douglas during the ensuing conflict. Livingston continued to act as guardian of James II after Douglas, who was seeking to strengthen the legitimacy of his faction, declared the formal end of the king's minority in November 1444.

A period of civil war followed the ascendancy of the Douglas-Livingston faction in 1443. Crichton sought the support of a group of Livingston's enemies, including Joan Beaufort and her second husband - whom Livingston had both imprisoned - along with James Douglas, 3rd Earl of Angus. Crichton's faction was quickly defeated in the civil war. Douglas besieged and captured Methven Castle, which was held for the queen mother, and awarded it to Livingston's second son, Alexander of Filde. Livingston's eldest son and heir, James, participated in an attack on the lands of James Kennedy, Bishop of St Andrews, an ally of the queen mother, early in 1445. The civil war reached its climax later that year, when Crichton himself was besieged in Edinburgh Castle and forced to surrender. The victory of the Douglas-Livingston faction was secured when the queen mother, who had taken refuge at Dunbar Castle, died there on 15 July 1445.

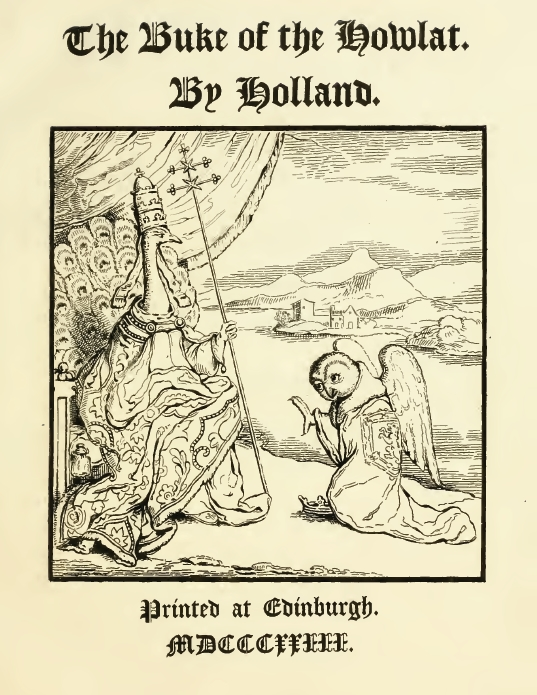
The Buke of the Howlat, published in the 1440s, has been proposed as a satirical attack on Livingston and his family.

Livingston acquired the important judicial role of Justiciar of Scotland in 1444, during the civil war. Possibly to consolidate his family's power, he had transferred his office of custodian of Stirling Castle to his eldest son, James, before 1445. Livingston also secured his eldest son's appointment as Lord High Chamberlain of Scotland by c. 1448. Livingston's cousin, Robert, who had previously supervised building work at Linlithgow Palace, became Comptroller of Scotland at around the same time, while Livingston's younger brother, John, was made custodian of Doune Castle. By 1449, the Livingston kinsmen formed one of the most wealthy and influential noble families in Scotland. Despite Livingston's success in promoting himself and his family, he lacked the territorial base from which to sustain his achievements in the long term.

=== Marriage with Clan Donald ===
Livingston's granddaughter, Elizabeth, was betrothed to marry John MacDonald, Earl of Ross and Lord of the Isles, probably in 1448. Elizabeth's wedding to the earl was celebrated in 1449. This was a prestigious marriage for the Livingston family. The contemporary satirical poem, the Buke of the Howlat, may have been directed against Livingston and his relatives for the aggrandizement represented by Elizabeth's marriage.

== Downfall of family ==
The minority of James II ended with the king's marriage to Mary of Guelders in July 1449. The king's obligation to contribute to his wife's dowry forced him to borrow money from Livingston's cousin, Robert, who had amassed considerable wealth in his role as Comptroller. Shortly after the royal wedding, the king turned against the Livingston family. James II likely decided to attack the family to avoid payment of his debt to Robert Livingston, which swelled to the large sum of £930. The wealth of the Livingston family represented an attractive prize for James II, who was struggling to manage state finances at this time. The king may also have opposed Elizabeth Livingston's marriage to the Earl of Ross.

The Livingston family's prominence came to an end on 20 September 1449, when James II ordered the arrest of most of its members. The king sent Livingston himself, as the principal member of the family, as an ambassador to England shortly before these arrests. Livingston was in Durham during the king's attack on his family. His two sons, James and Alexander, were arrested and imprisoned in Blackness Castle alongside his cousin, Robert Livingston, and three of his other male relatives. James II quickly removed Livingston loyalists from positions in the royal government. After being tried by the Parliament of Scotland, Livingston's second son and cousin were both executed on 21 January 1450. Livingston's eldest son later managed to escape from royal custody, and fled to the Outer Hebrides.

Livingston was forfeited during the same session of parliament that condemned his relatives to death. It is unlikely that he returned to Scotland after learning of his family's sudden downfall. Livingston was mentioned by James II in June 1450 as having been exiled from Scotland, and he presumably spent the rest of his life in England. Some accounts claim that Livingston did return to Scotland in the last year of his life, but was imprisoned in Dumbarton Castle. Livingston died on an unknown date between July and November 1451.

=== Posthumous rehabilitation ===
Livingston's eldest son, James, who escaped from the king's custody in 1451, was restored to royal favor in 1452. James Livingston's links with John MacDonald, Earl of Ross, forced James II to seek his support amidst a royal conflict with the Douglas family, in which Clan Donald actively opposed the king. The elder Livingston was granted a posthumous pardon by the Parliament of Scotland on 27 August 1452. This pardon cleared the way for James Livingston to return to a career in the king's service. James II reappointed him as Lord High Chamberlain of Scotland in 1454. The partial restoration of the Livingston family was completed in 1455, when James II created James Livingston a Lord of Parliament as Lord Livingston of Callendar.

== Issue ==
Livingston married an unnamed daughter of James Dundas of Dundas. As Livingston's eldest daughter was already married by 20 October 1422, his own marriage presumably took place in c. 1400. This marriage produced at least four children:

- James, 1st Lord Livingston (d. 1467)
- Alexander of Filde (d. 21 January 1450). He served as custodian of Methven Castle.
- Janet, who married James Hamilton of Cadzow.
- Elizabeth, of whom little is known.

== In fiction ==
His role in the events of the time is dealt with in Black Douglas by Nigel Tranter. He also has a role in Black Douglas by Samuel Rutherford Crockett.
