= The Black Douglas (novel) =

1899 novel by Samuel Rutherford Crockett

The Black Douglas is a historical fantasy novel by the Scottish author Samuel Rutherford Crockett published in 1899. It features the historical figures William Douglas, 6th Earl of Douglas (the "Black Douglas"), and Gilles de Retz ("Bluebeard"), though in reality they never met. It is set in Scotland and France in the fifteenth century and blends history with supernatural elements. The novel is cited as an influence for J.R.R. Tolkien's The Hobbit and The Lord of the Rings.

== Synopsis ==
The arms of William Douglas

The young Earl William of Douglas stops by Malise McKim's smithy to get his horse shod. Malise's sons, Sholto and Laurence, are also there. Earl William rides on into the evening and meets a beautiful young woman. She leads him to a pavilion in the forest. She says she is part of a French delegation and suggests that he accompanies her to Edinburgh, which he rejects. The seduction is interrupted by Malise and the Abbot of Dulce Cor who insist the woman is a witch. Earl William is dragged away against his will.

Earl William holds a wapenshaw at Threave Castle, the Douglas stronghold. Laurence pleases the Abbott with his singing and joins the Abbey. Sholto becomes Captain of the Guard. He is in love with Maud, the companion of Margaret Douglas, Fair Maid of Galloway, Earl William's younger sister. A French delegation led by Gilles de Retz arrives. In the delegation is the mysterious woman, who Earl William learns is named Lady Sybilla. In the night, a wolf-like creature invades the chamber of Margaret and Maud. Sholto wounds it as it escapes. On the third day, they hold a melee. De Retz moves to target Earl William, but Sholto steps in to defend him. The Frenchman is knocked unconscious. His armour is stripped off, revealing he has a wound similar to that given to the wolf-like creature. Sholto is knighted.

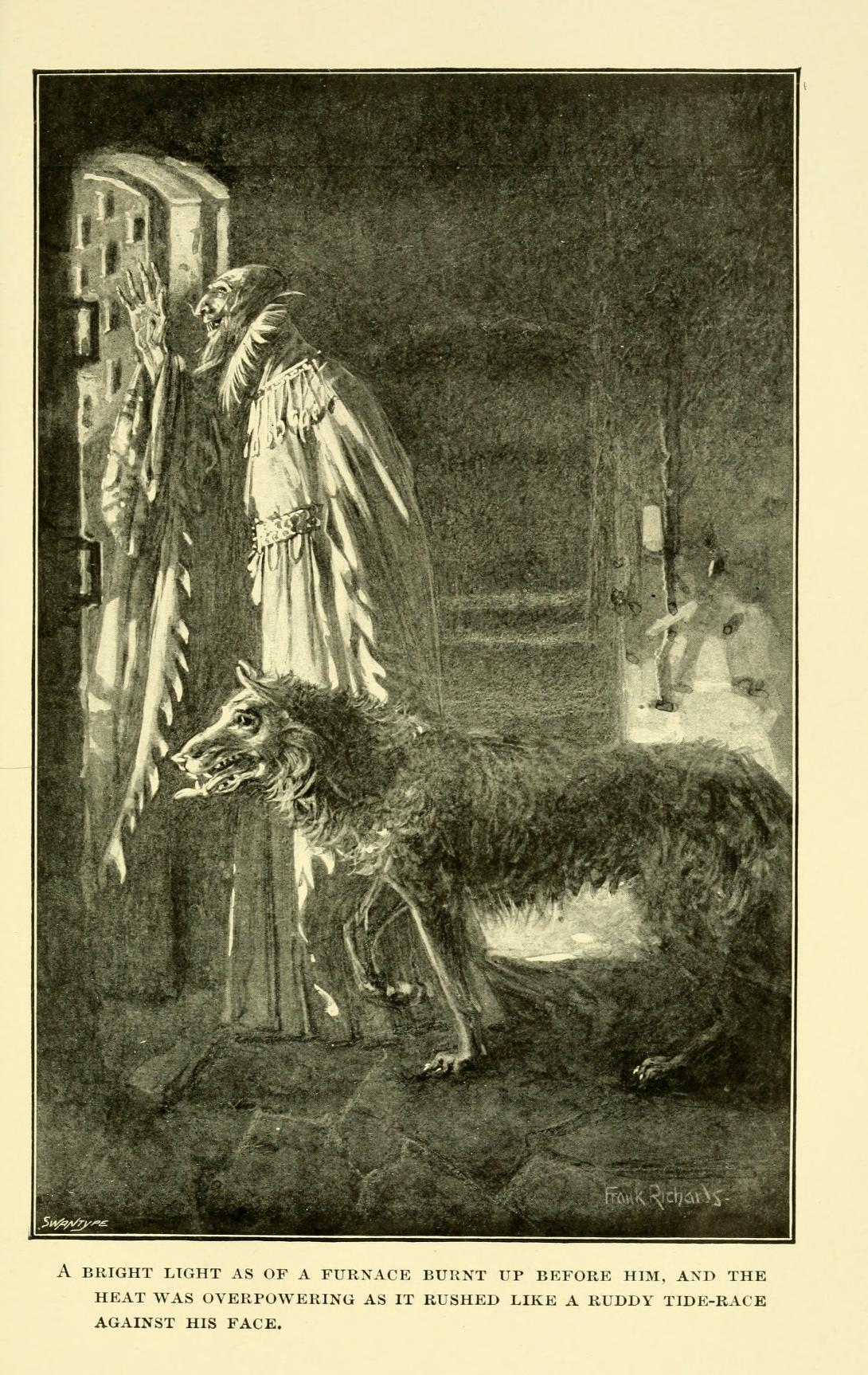
Gilles de Retz and the she-wolf Astarte

A week or two later, De Retz, Sir Alexander Livingston, Lord Chancellor William Crichton, and James, Earl of Avondale hold a council in Stirling Castle. They all agree on the need to get rid of Earl William, who is too powerful. Lady Sybilla is revealed as the secret weapon who will lure him to Edinburgh. Earl William receives letters from Crichton and Lady Sybilla, convincing him, against the advice of others, to go to Crichton Castle. His younger brother David, Sholto, and some men-at-arms accompany him. Earl William and Lady Sybilla spend a lot of time together alone. She warns him to leave, he refuses, and she declares her love for him. The next morning, he finds De Retz and Lady Sybilla have left for Edinburgh. He receives a message from Lady Sybilla, telling him not to follow her and to forget her. Though Sholto argues against him, he decides to follow her to Edinburgh.

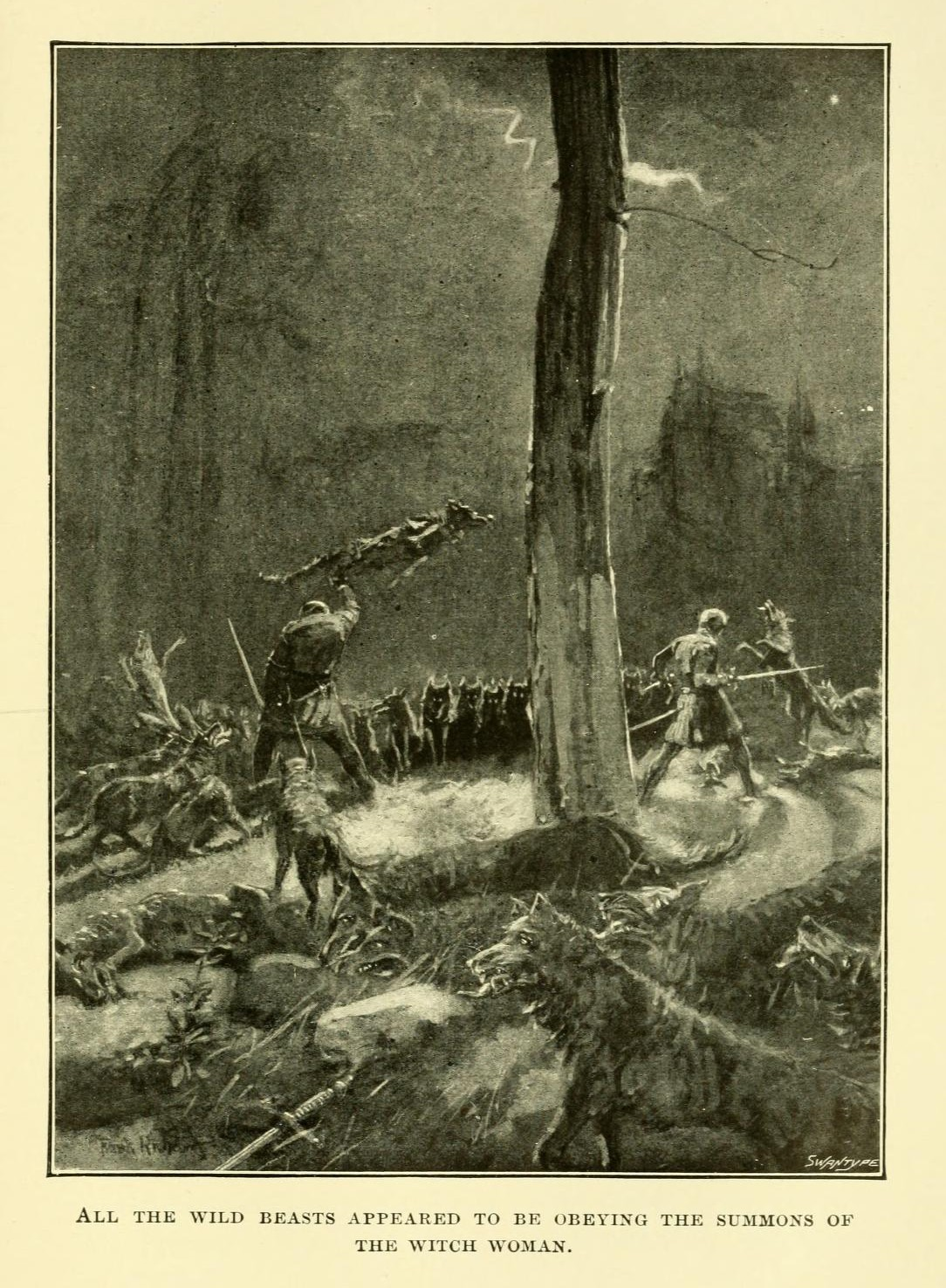
"All the wild beasts appeared to be obeying the summons of the witch woman".

Earl William is welcomed to a banquet with the young King James in Edinburgh Castle. He is served with the head of a black bull, the symbol of death. (This was a real historical event known as the Black Dinner.) Earl William is accused of treason, over the protests of the king. He, David, and Sholto are imprisoned. In the night, Malise, Laurence, and others try to rescue them, but the Earl refuses to leave the Lady Sybilla, and David refuses to leave him. The Earl orders Sholto to escape and raise the troops. The next morning, Earl William is put on trial. Under questioning by De Retz, Lady Sybilla admits that she had persuaded Earl William to come to Edinburgh to his death. Regardless, Earl William declares his love for her. He and David are beheaded.

Sholto and the others raise the Clan Douglas, who march against Edinburgh. He meets Lady Sybilla, pale with grief. She tells him to watch out for Maud and Margaret. When he returns to Threave, they have disappeared. Malise, Sholto, Laurence, and James of Douglas, Earl William's cousin, go to France, convinced that De Retz has kidnapped Maud and Margaret. They capture a ruffian, who happens to be in the service of De Retz. Without telling the others, Laurence frees him and joins the service of De Retz.

The others head to De Retz's Castle of Machecoul. They stay at the home of an old man, who warns them of his wife, La Meffraye. In the night, the old man is killed by a wolf. They escape and fight off a pack of werewolves. Meanwhile, inside the castle, Laurence discovers an iron altar on which De Retz conducts Satanic sacrifices of children. La Meffraye is one of his servants. Lady Sybilla finds the others in the forest and gives them a list of children killed by De Retz. She also reveals she has second sight. They rouse the peasants and convince the Duke of Brittany to lead his army against the castle. They rescue Margaret and Maud. The soldiers arrest De Retz, who is tried and executed. Maud and Sholto agree to get married.

== Sequel ==
Crockett published a sequel, Maid Margaret, following the life of Margaret Douglas, in 1905.

== Reception ==
Crockett was a best-selling novelist in his day, and The Black Douglas was one of his most famous books.

== Legacy ==
The fantasy author J.R.R. Tolkien wrote of being impressed as a boy by The Black Douglas. He said he based the battle with the wargs in The Lord of the Rings on Crockett's battle with werewolves. However Tolkien said that he hadn't read the novel as an adult. Scholar Douglas A. Anderson has drawn parallels with the attack of the wargs in The Hobbit. In addition, in his opinion, the ending of the chapter "The Battle of the Werewolves" in The Black Douglas is similar to the end of "The Siege of Gondor" in The Lord of the Rings. Jared Lobdell has suggested The Black Douglas's overall style and imagery had an influence on Tolkien, and that De Retz inspired Tolkien's character, Sauron. Sholto's secret mail-coat may have inspired Frodo's mithril coat.
