= James Livingston, 1st Lord Livingston =

Scottish courtier and administrator

James Livingston, 1st Lord Livingston (c. 1410 – 1467) was a Scottish nobleman.

== Early life ==
Livingston was born at Callendar House in Scotland around 1410. He was the son and heir of Sir Alexander Livingston of Callendar. His sister, Janet Livingston, was married to James Hamilton of Cadzow. His father was Justiciar of Scotland, and keeper of Stirling Castle who is known for conspiring with Lord William Crichton in the assassination of the 6th Earl of Douglas and his brother, David, at the "Black Dinner" at Edinburgh Castle.

His mother was a daughter of James Dundas of Dundas, and his paternal grandparents were Sir John Livingston of Callendar and his wife, a daughter of Sir John Menteith of Kerse. Through his sister, he was uncle to James Hamilton, 1st Lord Hamilton, Alexander Hamilton (the ancestor of the Hamiltons of Silvertonhill), and Gavin Hamilton (ancestor of the Hamiltons of Dalzell).

== Career ==
From 1442 to 1448, Livingston served as Captain of Stirling Castle and in 1444/5, he was Keeper of the King's Person.

Under James II of Scotland, he served as Great Chamberlain of Scotland from 1448 to 1450 (during which time he was arrested in 1449, but soon released). From 1451 to 1454, he was keeper of Inverness Castle before again serving as Chamberlain from 1454 to 1467 during the end of James II's reign and into James III of Scotland's reign.

From 1454 to 1455, in 1457, again from 1460 to 1461 and lastly from 1465 to 1466, he was a Commissioner for a truce with England before serving as Scotland's Ambassador to England in 1466.

== Personal life ==
Livingston was married to Marian (née de Berwick) Oliphant (c. 1410–1478), the daughter of Thomas de Berwick and widow of Sir William Oliphant of Aberdalgie. Together, they were the parents of:

- James Livingston, 2nd Lord Livingston (1430–1497), who died unmarried.
- Alexander Livingston (d. 1472).
- Rev. David Livingston, who became rector of Ayr, Provost of Lincluden, and Keeper of the Privy Seal of Scotland.
- Elizabeth Livingston, who married John Macdonald, 11th Earl of Ross.
- Eupheme Livingston (c. 1445–1493), who married Malcolm Fleming, Master of Fleming (c. 1444–1477), eldest son and heir apparent of Robert Fleming, 1st Lord Fleming.
- Marion Livingston, who married William Crichton, 3rd Lord Crichton.

Livingston died sometime between 26 April and 7 November 1467. His widow died sometime between 4 June and 19 October 1478.

=== Descendants ===
Through his second son Alexander, he was a grandfather of Sir James Livingston (d. 1503), who became the 3rd Lord Livingston upon the death of his uncle in 1497, and married Agnes Houston, daughter of John Houston of that Ilk.

Through his daughter Eupheme, he was the grandfather of John Fleming, 2nd Lord Fleming and great-grandfather of John's son, Malcolm Fleming, 3rd Lord Fleming, who married Janet Stewart, illegitimate daughter of King James IV of Scotland who was governess to Mary, Queen of Scots in 1548.

Peerage of Scotland
New creation	Lord Livingston; 1458–1467	Succeeded by James Livingston
