= Asloan Manuscript =

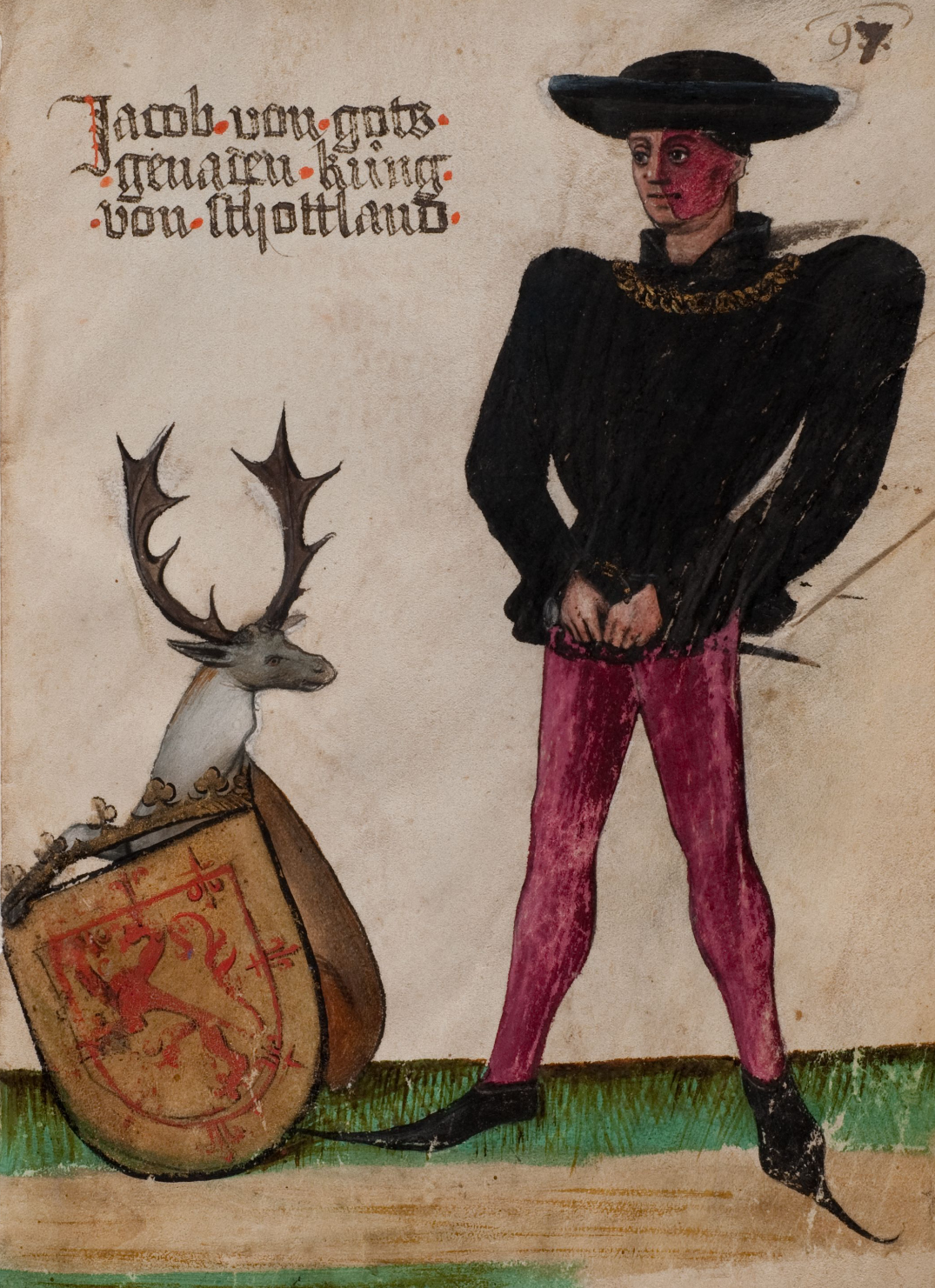
James II of Scotland, the subject of the manuscript's Auchinleck Chronicle as depicted by his contemporary Georg von Ehingen.

The Asloan Manuscript is an anthology of Scots prose and poetry dating to the early sixteenth century. It was compiled by the Edinburgh notary John Asloan.

The manuscript's poetry consists of works by Henryson, Dunbar, Richard Holland and anonymous authors. The prose works consist of historical chronicles and religious and moral texts, often translations of famous works from elsewhere in Europe.

It is held by the National Library of Scotland.

== Works represented in the manuscript ==
Among the pieces preserved in the Asloan Manuscript are:

- Ane schort memoriale also known as the Auchinleck Chronicle, a history of the reign of James II preserved only in the Asloan manuscript.
- Henryson's "The tale of the twa mys" from the Morall Fabillis and The Tale of Orpheus and Erudices his Quene.
- Dunbar's The justis betuix the talzeour and the sowtar and Off the fenzeit fals frere of Tungland.
- Holland's Buke of the Howlat.
- The Buke of the Chess. A Scots translation of Jacobus de Cessolis' Latin Book of Chess, a series of essays on moral themes.
- The Porteous of Noblenes. A Scots translation of Alain Chartier's Breviaire des Nobles, a guide to courtly manners.
- The Crying of Ane Play, a comic monologue by an ancient dwarf.
