= S. R. Crockett =

Scottish novelist (1859–1914)

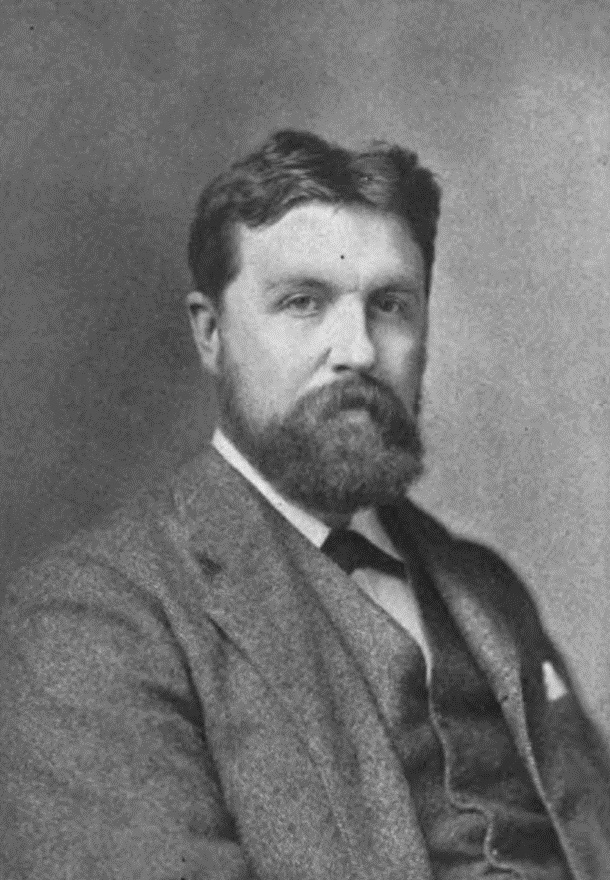
- Samuel Rutherford Crockett, by Elliott & Fry
- Born: 24 September 1859; Balmaghie, Kirkcudbrightshire, Scotland
- Died: 16 April 1914 (aged 54); Tarascon-sur-Rhône, France
- Resting place: Balmaghie
- Education: University of Edinburgh
- Occupations: Minister, writer
- Writing career
- Period: 1890-1914
- Genres: Novel, magazine and periodical serial

Samuel Rutherford Crockett (24 September 1859 – 16 April 1914), who published under the name "S. R. Crockett", was a Scottish novelist.

== Life and work ==
He was born at Little Duchrae, Balmaghie, Kirkcudbrightshire, Galloway, on 24 September 1859, the illegitimate son of dairymaid Annie Crocket. He was raised by his Cameronian grandparents on the tenanted farm until 1867 when the family moved to Cotton Street, Castle Douglas (later fictionalised as Cairn Edward).

He won the Galloway bursary to Edinburgh University in 1876, where he studied for an MA. He began his journalistic career to supplement his bursary, writing for magazines from 1877.

He matriculated at Edinburgh each year until 1880 but in April 1881 he left the University without formally graduating. It is thought he travelled abroad during this summer, but returned to matriculate at Edinburgh's New College for a BSc in November 1881. He matriculated there again in 1882 and in 1883 but during 1884 he once more travelled abroad for an extensive period, working as a tutor. He returned to matriculate for Divinity in December 1885 and finally graduated in the summer of 1886.

He became minister of The Free Kirk Penicuik in November 1886. He married Ruth Mary Milner (daughter of George Milner) on March 10, 1887. He played a large part in gaining justice for the relatives of victims in the Mauricewood Pit Disaster of 1889. He became a member of the Scottish Arts Club in 1894. He left the ministry in January 1895 to pursue a full-time writing career.

The Crocketts had four children: Maisie Rutherford, Philip Hugh Barbour, George Milner and Margaret Douglas, all of whom featured in his children's fictions. The family moved from Bank House, Penicuik in 1906 to Torwood House, Peebles, but Crockett spent much of the year abroad and also regularly returned to Galloway.

He published a volume of poetry, Dulce Cor (Latin: Sweet Heart), under the pseudonym Ford Brereton in 1886. Dulce Cor is a ruined abbey in Galloway. In the late 1880s, he was a regular contributor to The Christian Leader magazine, under W. H. Wylie. In 1893 he was noticed by William Robertson Nicoll, and introduced to publisher T. Fisher Unwin, who published a first collection of short stories and sketches under the title The Stickit Minister and some common men in 1893. It was an instant success, going into six editions within the year. He was taken on by leading London literary agent A. P. Watt, who managed his career until his death. There followed extensive publications across a range of journals, magazines, and periodicals in the UK and America, and most of his 60+ serial works were subsequently published in novel form through James Clarke and Co, Hodder & Stoughton, and others.

Bank House, Penicuik. The property was occupied by Crockett from 1893 to 1906.

His contemporary J. M. Barrie had already created a demand for stories in Lowland Scots, with his sketches of Thrums in the late 1880s. R. L. Stevenson, a corresponding friend of both writers, described the relationship thus: "you are out of doors and Barrie is indoors," in a letter in 1893.

Crockett's breakthrough year occurred in 1894 when T. Fisher Unwin published no fewer than four of his works: The Raiders, The Lilac Sunbonnet, The PlayActress and Mad Sir Uchtred of the Hills.

Crockett was one of the new breed of professional writers emerging in the late 19th century whose work was written for the emerging popular "mass market" readership. As one of the foremost celebrity authors, he divided literary critics both in his own time and subsequently. Fellow late-nineteenth-century novelist George Gissing, for instance, found his novel The Raiders "wearisome". His early work was dismissed by some contemporary critics as Kailyard, and it was a label that has proved hard to shift. The stigma associated with it has seen his work overlooked for many years. However, Crockett's own views on Kailyard were published in the article 'Scottish National Humour' in the Contemporary Review in April 1895. Returning to primary source material like this has afforded a reappraisal of the nebulous connection with Kailyard as evidenced by a re-appraisal of the whole Kailyard concept by writers such as Andrew Nash. The mid-20th century view that his later work was "over-prolific and feebly sentimental" is now being challenged. His work is much less easy to categorise than such simplification suggests, not least because it is so extensive. Most broadly, it falls into an historical adventure romance genre. However, he also wrote of contemporary issues, largely from a rural perspective. He championed the rural working classes and was outspoken against all forms of hierarchy. While many of his stories are set in rural Galloway, there are also stories set in Edinburgh, Scotland, England, France, Spain, and further abroad.

In the late 1890s he was commissioned to write many introductions (including Blackwood's 1895 edition of John Galt) and, for children, versions of Sir Walter Scott stories (Red Cap Tales and Red Cap Adventures). He wrote nonfiction as well, including a booklet published by the London camera manufacturer, Newman & Guardia, in 1900, comparing cameras favourably to pen and pencil and explaining how he encountered the N and G advertisement. This led to the publications of a nonfiction work, The Adventurer in Spain (1903), which he illustrated along with Gordon Browne. His nonfiction work Raiderland (1904) takes the reader into the Galloway of his youth. He was an early adopter of the typewriter. His novel Vida (1908) first serialised in The People's Friend in 1907, features what is arguably the first car chase in fiction.

In his youth, he was a mountaineer and had an interest in astronomy.

Crockett died in Tarascon, France, on 16 April 1914, and was buried at Balmaghie Kirk on April 24 that year. A memorial to him was erected in Laurieston by public subscription in 1932. Queen Elizabeth (later the Queen Mother) was a benefactor.

== Legacy and influence ==
- A monument to Crockett can be seen at Laurieston, near Castle Douglas, Kirkcudbrightshire. It was designed by architect Thomas Peach Weir Young and unveiled in 1932.
- Crockett's 1901 novel Cinderella was filmed in 1922 as A Lowland Cinderella and was directed by Sidney Morgan and starred Joan Morgan.
- The Lilac Sunbonnet was adapted for the screen in 1923; it was directed by Sidney Morgan and starred Joan Morgan, Warwick Ward and Pauline Peters.
- In 2014 The Galloway Raiders was set up as a literary society and online presence to explore his life and work and restore his credibility as one of Scotland's great writers. The Galloway Raiders also holds two archives of Crockett material; that of his biographer Dr Islay Donaldson, 'The Donaldson Archive'; and Crockett scholar Richard D. Jackson, 'The Jackson archive'.
- Some papers are held by Edinburgh University. Their website information is inaccurate in many respects, including both birth and death dates.
- A biography was published in 1989 by Dr Islay Donaldson: The Life and Works of Samuel Rutherford Crockett and republished in 2016. ISBN 9781-9-10601-14-3
- J. R. R. Tolkien credits him as an influence on his wolf-fight scenes: "the episode of the 'wargs' (I believe) is in part derived from a scene in S. R. Crockett's The Black Douglas, probably his best romance and anyway one that deeply impressed me in school-days".

Most of Crockett's work is now back in print. In 2014 Ayton Publishing Limited published the 32-volume Galloway Collection, in time for the centenary of his death.

In 2025 The S.R.Crockett Cultural Legacy Charity (SCIO)was set up and in April 2026 the S.R.Crockett Online Museum opened The aim of both is the re-evaluate and restore the reputation of this overlooked Scottish author. It holds the research archives of Dr Donaldson and Crockett Scholar Richard D. Jackson, offers a digital library, exhibition spaces and a reading room.

== Published works ==
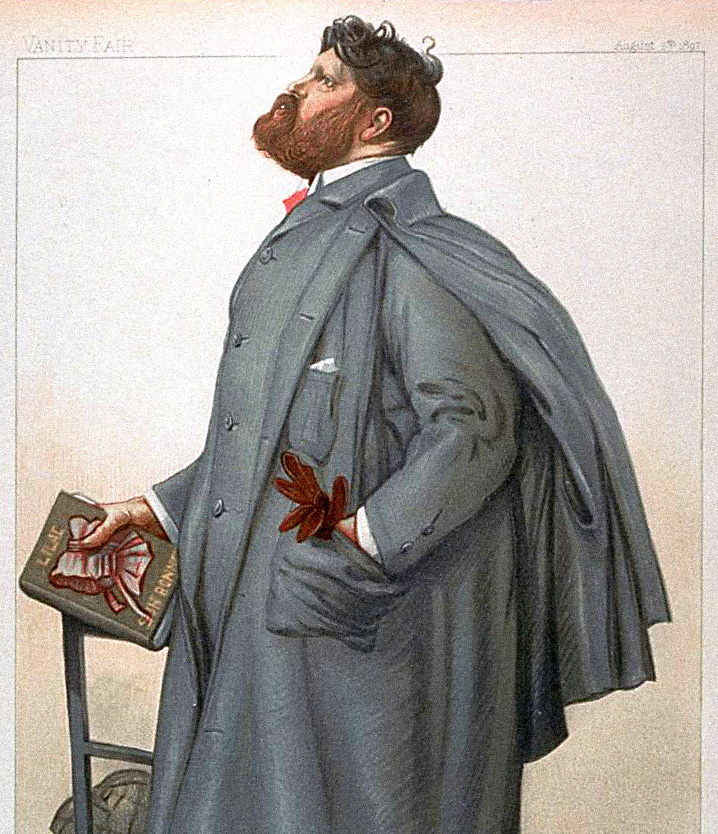
Caricature of author Samuel Rutherford Crockett from the 5 August 1897 issue of Vanity Fair

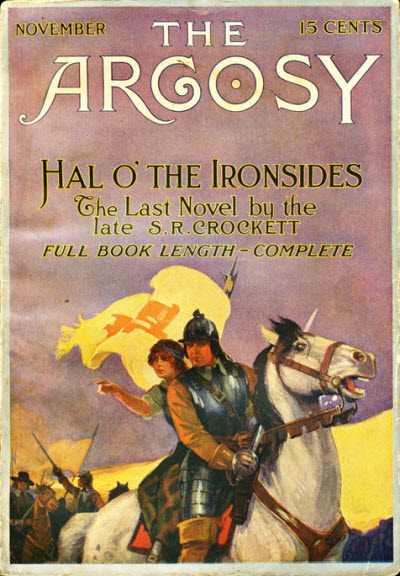
Crockett's Hal o' the Ironsides was originally published in The Argosy in 1914.

The current most comprehensive list of Crockett's published work in book form amounts to 66 and is derived from Donaldson and The Complete Crockett. Details of original UK and US publishers are given where known. A substantial number of works have been republished since the 100th anniversary of his death and are available as print or digital versions. Most comprehensive is The Galloway Collection. Given the ephemerality of magazine publication it is impossible to give a complete list of all his serialised work or published short stories.

- Dulce Cor (1886) London, Kegan, Paul and Co.
- The Stickit Minister (1893) London T. Fisher Unwin
- The Raiders (1894) London, T. Fisher Unwin
- Mad Sir Uchtred of the Hills (1894) London, T. Fisher Unwin
- The Lilac Sunbonnet (1894) London, T. Fisher Unwin
- The PlayActress (1894) London, T. Fisher Unwin
- Men of the Moss Hags (1895) London, Isbister and Co.
- Bog Myrtle and Peat (1895) London, Bliss, Foster and Sands.
- A Galloway Herd (1895) New York, R. Fenno and Co.
- Cleg Kelly (1896) London, Methuen and Co.
- The Grey Man (1896) London, T. Fisher Unwin. New York, Harper & Brothers, 1896
- Sweetheart Travellers (1896) London, Wells, Gardner, Darton and Co.
- Lads' Love (1897) London, Bliss, Sands and Co.
- Lochinvar (1897) London: Methuen and Co.
- The Surprising Adventures of Sir Toady Lion (1897) London: Gardner, Darton and Co. New York: Frederick A. Stokes
- The Red Axe (1898) London: Smith, Elder and Co. New York: Harper & Bros.
- The Standard Bearer (1898) London: Methuen and Co. New York, D. Appleton & Co, 1898
- The Black Douglas (1899) London: Smith, Elder and Co
- Kit Kennedy (1899) London: James Clarke and Co. Toronto: W. Briggs.
- Ione March (1899) London: Hodder & Stoughton.
- Joan of the Sword Hand (1900) London: Ward, Lock and Co. Toronto: Copp, Clark.
- The Stickit Minister's Wooing (1900) London: Hodder & Stoughton.
- Little Anna Mark (1900) London: Smith, Elder and Co.
- Love Idylls (1901) London: John Murray.
- Cinderella (1901) London: James Clarke and Co.
- The Firebrand (1901) London: Macmillan and Co.
- The Silver Skull (1901) London: Smith, Elder and Co.
- The Dark o' the Moon (1902) London: Macmillan and Co.
- Flower o the Corn (1902) London: James Clarke and Co.
- The Adventurer in Spain (1903) London: Isbister and Co.
- The Banner of Blue (1903) London: Hodder & Stoughton.
- The Loves of Miss Anne (1903) London: James Clarke and Co.
- Strong Mac (1904) London: Ward, Lock and Co.
- Raiderland (1904) London: Hodder & Stoughton.
- Red Cap Tales (1904) London: Adam and Charles Black. New York: Macmillan.
- Maid Margaret (1905) London: Hodder & Stoughton.
- The Cherry Ribband (1905) London: Hodder & Stoughton.
- Kid McGhie (1905) London: James Clarke and Co. (published as Fishers of Men in the US)
- Sir Toady Crusoe (1905) London: Wells, Gardner, Darton and Co.
- The White Plumes of Navarre (1906) London: Religious Tract Society.
- Little Esson (1907) London: Ward, Lock and Co.
- Me and Myn (1907) London: T. Fisher Unwin.
- Vida (1907) London: James Clarke and Co.
- Deep Moat Grange (1908) London: Hodder & Stoughton.
- Princess Penniless (1908) London: Hodder & Stoughton.
- The Bloom o' the Heather (1908) London: Eveleigh, Nash.
- Red Cap Adventures (1908) London: Adam and Charles Black, New York: Macmillan and Co.
- The Men of the Mountain (1909) London: Religious Tract Society.
- Rose of the Wilderness (1909) London: Hodder & Stoughton.
- The Seven Wise Men (1909) London: Hodder & Stoughton.
- My Two Edinburghs (1909) London: The Cedar Press.
- The Dew of Their Youth (1910) London: Hodder & Stoughton.
- Young Nick and Old Nick (1910) London: Stanley Paul and Co.
- The Lady of a Hundred Dresses (1911) London: Eveleigh, Nash.
- Love in Pernicketty Town (1911) London: Hodder & Stoughton.
- The Smugglers (1911) London: Hodder & Stoughton.
- The Moss Troopers (1912) London: Hodder & Stoughton (published as Patsy in the US)
- Sweethearts at Home (1912) London: Hodder & Stoughton.
- Sandy's Love Affair (1913) London: Hodder & Stoughton.
- A Tatter of Scarlet (1913) London: Hodder & Stoughton.
- Silver Sand (1914) London: Hodder & Stoughton.
- Hal o' the Ironsides (1915) Posthumous London; Hodder & Stoughton.
- The Azure Hand (1917) Posthumous London: Hodder & Stoughton.
- The White Pope (1920) Posthumous Edinburgh; Advocates Library.
- Rogues Island (1926) Posthumous London: Hodder & Stoughton
- Peter the Renegade (2016) Posthumous: Turriff: Ayton Publishing

== In fiction ==
S.R. Crockett features as a character in Dorothy Alexander's novel, The Mauricewood Devils (2016).

== See also ==
- George MacDonald
- Ian Maclaren
- John Joy Bell
- J.M. Barrie
- William Robertson Nicoll

== Notes and references ==
- Bleiler, Everett (1948). The Checklist of Fantastic Literature. Chicago: Shasta Publishers. p. 88.
- Chisholm, Hugh, ed. (1911). "Crockett, Samuel Rutherford" . Encyclopædia Britannica (11th ed.). Cambridge University Press.
- Daiches, David, ed. (1971). The Penguin companion to English literature. Vol. 1. McGraw-Hill. ISBN 9780070492752.
- Nash, Andrew (2007). Kailyard and Scottish Literature. Rodopi. ISBN 978-90-420-2203-4.
- Ousby, I., ed. (1995). The Cambridge Guide to Literature in English. Cambridge University Press.
- Rateliff, John D.; Tolkien, John Ronald Reuel (2007). Mr. Baggins a History of Hobbit. HarperCollins. ISBN 978-0-261-10291-0.
- Rex, Richard E. (2016). Alice Muriel Williamson: The Secret History of an American-English Author. Mill City Press. ISBN 978-1-63505-309-8.
