= David Stewart, Earl of Moray =

Scottish prince

David Stewart, Earl of Moray (c. 1455 – before 18 July 1457) was a son of King James II of Scotland.

He was created Earl of Moray on 12 February 1456, yet he died aged between one and three, before 18 July 1457.
