= James II of Scotland =

King of Scots from 1437 to 1460

James II
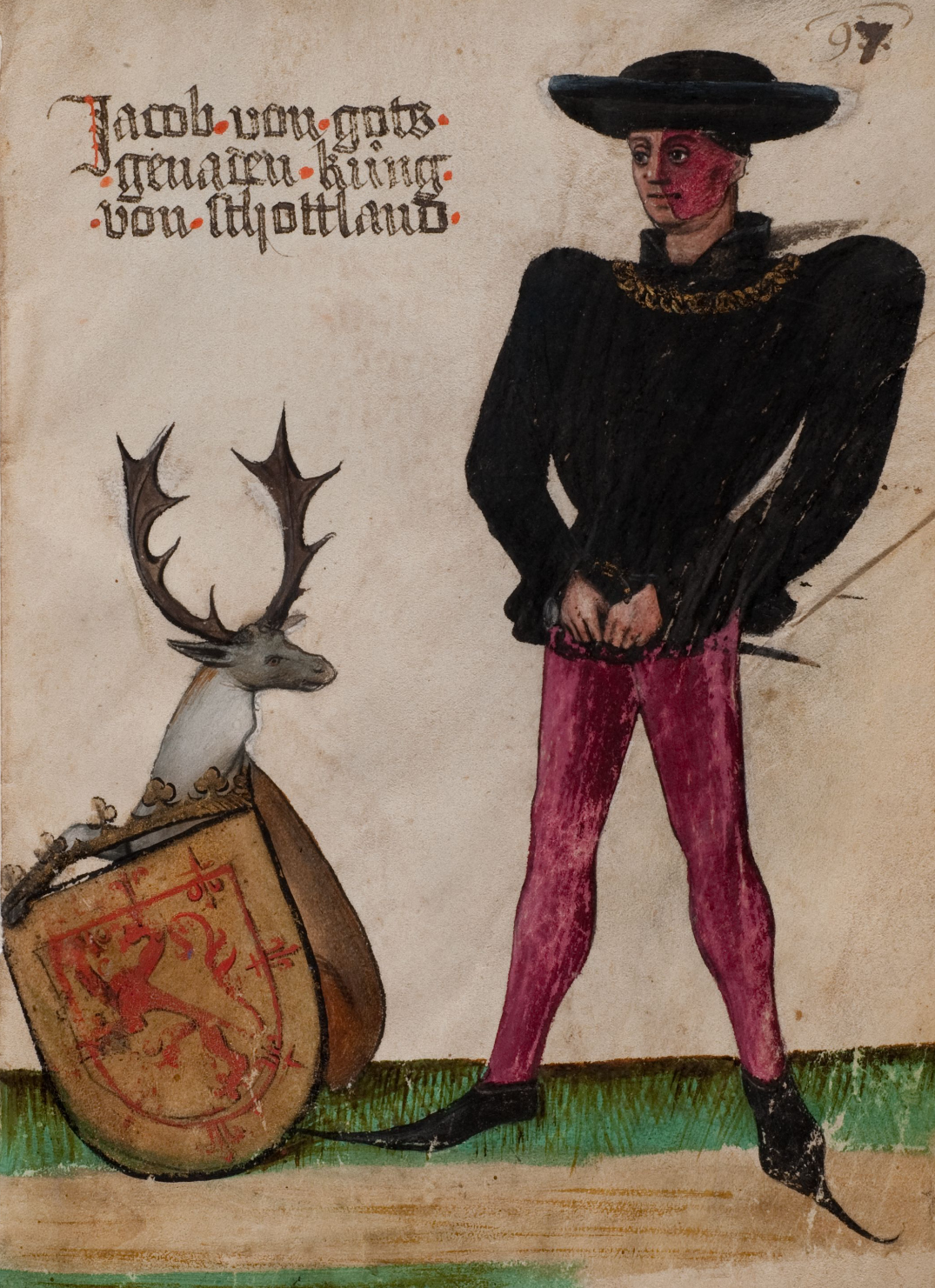
- Contemporary image of the king, showing his distinctive facial birthmark

King of Scots
- Reign: 21 February 1437 – 3 August 1460
- Coronation: 26 March 1437
- Predecessor: James I
- Successor: James III
- Born: 16 October 1430; Holyrood Palace, Scotland
- Died: 3 August 1460 (aged 29); Roxburgh Castle, Roxburghshire, Scotland
- Burial: Holyrood Abbey
- Spouse: Mary of Guelders (m. 1449)
- Issue: Mary; James III of Scotland; Alexander, Duke of Albany; David, Earl of Moray; John, Earl of Mar; Margaret
- House: Stewart
- Father: James I of Scotland
- Mother: Joan Beaufort

James II (16 October 1430 – 3 August 1460) was King of Scots from 1437 until his death in 1460. The eldest surviving son of James I of Scotland, he succeeded to the Scottish throne at the age of six. James began his personal rule in 1449 after a turbulent minority dominated by the ambitions of successive Earls of Douglas. Tensions between James and William, 8th Earl of Douglas, led to Douglas's murder in 1452 and an ensuing civil war. James defeated the Douglas family in 1455, seizing its lands and forcing its surviving members into exile. James pursued an aggressive foreign policy in the remaining years of his reign; he exploited the Wars of the Roses to launch repeated attacks against England, and sought territorial concessions from France and the Kalmar Union. James summoned frequent parliaments to pass legislation, but faced criticism from these bodies over his judicial policies. He was killed by an exploding bombard at Roxburgh Castle in 1460. James has been described as a largely successful king who strengthened the Scottish monarchy. He was succeeded by his son, James III.

== Birth and accession ==
James was born at Holyrood Palace on 16 October 1430, the younger of the twin sons of James I and Joan Beaufort. The twins' birth was greeted with public celebrations in Edinburgh. James I knighted his newborn sons, together with the heirs of various noblemen. The elder of the twins, Alexander, died before 22 April 1431, leaving James as the king's only surviving son and heir to the Scottish throne. James was born with a large red birthmark that covered one side of his face, a characteristic described by the contemporary Auchinleck chronicle as "the fyre mark in his face".

Little is known about James's early childhood. He was resident at Doune Castle in 1431, while in 1434 the king ordered Edinburgh Castle to be repaired to accommodate him. Michael Ramsay, the keeper of Lochmaben Castle, served as James's guardian during his infancy. Ramsay was removed from this position in 1431, after which John Spens of Glendouglas, an adherent of Walter, Earl of Atholl, became James's guardian. The king trusted Spens, who had previously served as comptroller, probably because of his connections with the Earl of Atholl.

James became King of Scots on 21 February 1437, after his father's assassination at the Blackfriars monastery in Perth. The king's death was orchestrated by his uncle, the Earl of Atholl. The earl's plans against James I were the culmination of longstanding disputes between the two men. Atholl, an elderly man, was anxious over the king's interference in his estates, which threatened the effective disinheritance of Robert Stewart, his grandson and heir. Atholl may have sought to secure his own position by becoming regent on behalf of the young James II, which necessitated the removal of both the king and queen. Atholl's contemporary, Walter Bower, accused the earl of attempting to seize the throne for himself in fulfillment of an alleged prophecy.

Atholl's attempt to seize power ended in abject failure. Although James I was killed by Atholl's assassins, the queen managed to escape to safety and travelled quickly to Edinburgh, where she secured custody of her son and expelled Atholl's adherent, John Spens, from his household. Spens' lands had been distributed among the queen's loyalists by the end of 1437, and he may have been executed for his involvement in the conspiracy. The queen's success in gaining custody of James II stabilised her position, and Atholl surrendered the following month to her ally, William, Earl of Angus. Atholl was taken to Edinburgh and beheaded on 26 March. The earl's fellow conspirators were tortured and executed.

== Royal minority ==
James II was crowned at Holyrood Abbey on 26 March 1437 by Michael Ochiltree, Bishop of Dunblane. Concerns over the king's safety forced the coronation celebrations to be held within Edinburgh Castle. Queen Joan, who had received an oath of "retinence and fidelty" from parliament in 1435, likely planned to leverage her victory against Atholl to assume power as regent for James II. The queen's hopes were disappointed in May 1437, when a general council appointed Archibald, 5th Earl of Douglas, as regent with the title of "lieutenant-general". The general council allowed the queen to retain custody of James II, who was to be kept at Stirling Castle alongside his sisters. Despite these arrangements, the king was brought to Edinburgh before 1439 in the custody of William Crichton, one of his father's former courtiers.

James II's mother, Joan Beaufort, who struggled for political influence in Scotland until her death in 1445.

Douglas's regency witnessed a period of disorder in Scotland, in contrast to the relative stability of James I's reign. General councils in 1438 and 1439 complained about open rebellion and widespread theft in the kingdom. Scotland also suffered from famine and outbreaks of plague during these years, causing great suffering among the population. Concerns over law and order persisted beyond Douglas's death in 1439; in August 1440, a general council asked the ten year-old James II to "ride throughout the realm immediately" to suppress instances of rebellion and violent crime. The council's request was likely directed against the king's justiciars for failing to fulfill their duties.

Douglas died on 26 June 1439, of fever during an outbreak of plague, after which no successor as lieutenant-general was appointed. Queen Joan recognised Douglas's death as an opportunity to seize power for herself, and was able to remove James II from Crichton's custody in Edinburgh, establishing the king at Stirling instead. The queen's plans were opposed by various councilors, including Crichton and James, Earl of Avandale, Douglas's younger brother. These men endorsed the decision of Alexander Livingston of Callendar, the keeper of Stirling, to arrest Queen Joan and her second husband, James Stewart of Lorn, in the castle on 3 August. A general council convened at Stirling in September to formalise the new state of affairs. Although the queen was released from confinement, she was forced to surrender custody of James II to Livingston.

=== Black Dinner and aftermath ===
From the autumn of 1439, the Scottish regency council was dominated by Crichton, Avandale, Livingston, and their allies. The growth of William, 6th Earl of Douglas, the son of the late lieutenant-general, into adulthood provided a new source of political tension in 1440. The young earl may have sought to claim the regency as his father's heir. Faced with a potential crisis in their exercise of power, Crichton and Avandale decided to kill Douglas. Crichton invited Douglas to Edinburgh Castle on 24 November 1440, where the earl was taken by surprise and beheaded in an event known as the "Black Dinner". Douglas's younger brother, David, was also executed, allowing Avandale to inherit the prestigious earldom of Douglas.

The new Earl of Douglas, known as James the Gross due to his great weight, spent the rest of his life attempting to enhance his family's position in Scotland. In the years following the Black Dinner, he secured Galloway and the earldom of Moray for his sons through marriage to their heiresses. Earl James's ambitions in Moray provoked conflict with Crichton, now serving as chancellor, who had planned to gain the earldom for his eldest son. Tensions between the two men erupted into open violence in 1442. In the wake of these events, Crichton joined the growing faction gathered around Queen Joan and her ally, James, Earl of Angus.

The queen's return to politics occurred amid ecclesiastical controversy in Scotland. In 1439, the Council of Florence, then meeting at Ferrara, had elected Amadeus VIII, Duke of Savoy, as an antipope under the name of Felix V. James the Gross recognised Felix V and the council, while Queen Joan and her clerical allies supported Eugene IV, the legitimate pope. In July 1442, the earl intimidated a provincial council of papalist bishops, led by the queen's ally, Bishop Kennedy of St Andrews, into dissolving by night. James the Gross died in March 1443, after which Scottish support for Felix V was largely abandoned.

=== Factional conflict (1443–1445) ===
James the Gross was succeeded by his eldest son, William, 8th Earl of Douglas, who continued his father's conflict with Crichton. In August 1443, Douglas destroyed a tower house at Barnton belonging to George Crichton of Blackness, the chancellor's cousin. Douglas brought the twelve year-old James II to Barnton, displaying the royal banner to ensure the tower's surrender. This was merely the first stage of the new earl's campaign against the Crichton family. Douglas convened a general council on 4 November 1443 to outlaw Crichton and his relatives and removed the chancellor from the regency council. Crichton responded to this condemnation by attacking Douglas's estates. The events of 1443 marked a period of renewed disorder in Scotland, as local disputes erupted in various parts of the kingdom.

Douglas may have become lieutenant-general of the kingdom late in 1443, but this is uncertain. Seeking to strengthen his position against Queen Joan and her allies, the earl proclaimed the end of James II's minority in November 1444. This proclamation was essentially a legal fiction, giving Douglas greater authority to condemn his enemies as rebels. The sporadic political conflict intensified into open civil war after November 1444. Douglas captured Methven Castle, held on the queen's behalf, in the same month. Early in 1445, Douglas's ally, David, Earl of Crawford, attacked lands in Fife held by the queen and Bishop Kennedy. Crichton was besieged in Edinburgh Castle in June 1445, at the culmination of the civil war, resisting Douglas's forces for six weeks until he surrendered. Queen Joan was besieged in Dunbar Castle, where she died on 15 July. Parliament convened in Edinburgh during these events, confirming Douglas's authority and summoning the late queen's allies to answer charges of rebellion. The king's stepfather, James Stewart of Lorn, fled to England to escape these summons.

=== Douglas ascendancy (1445–1449) ===
Douglas's victory in 1445 allowed him to dominate Scottish politics for the next several years. His younger brothers, Archibald and Hugh, appeared respectively as earls of Moray and Ormond for the first time in the parliament of 1445. Douglas and his brothers counted for three of the five earls present in parliament. Douglas rewarded his allies in the civil war with new grants of land and allowed the Livingston family, his longtime associates, to gain extensive power in the royal administration. The Buke of the Howlat, written by Richard Holland in the late 1440s, was intended as an allegory for Douglas's status and prestige among the Scottish nobility in these years.

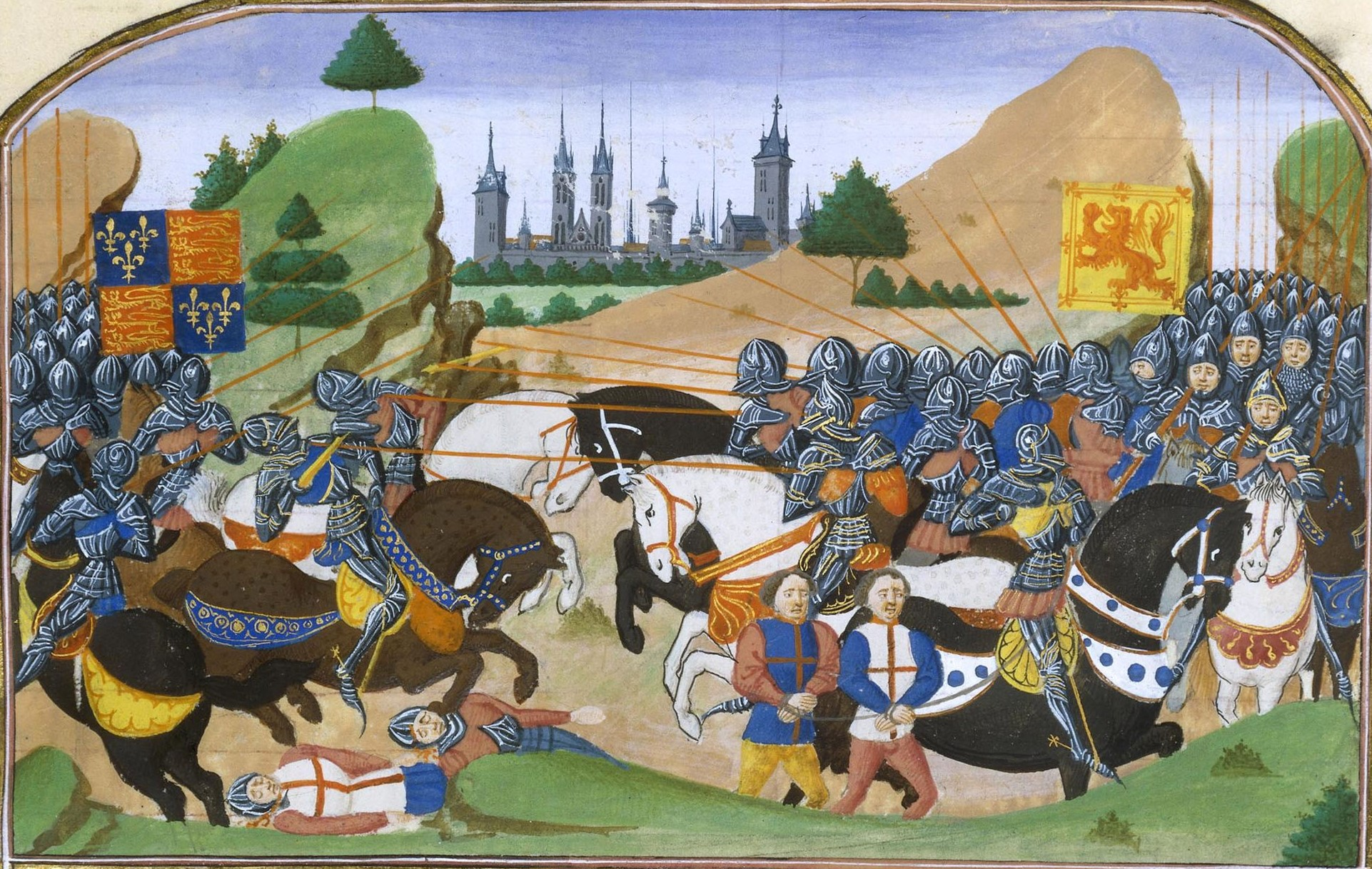
The Battle of Sark, fought in 1448, when a Scottish army defeated a large English raid on Annandale.

The Douglas family confirmed its political primacy during renewed conflict between Scotland and England at the end of the decade. Scottish ambassadors were sent to meet with the king's uncle, Edmund Beaufort, Duke of Somerset, early in 1447, but negotiations ended in uncertain circumstances. Hostility on the Anglo-Scottish border erupted into open war in 1448, as Henry Percy, Earl of Northumberland, led an English army to attack Annandale. Douglas's brother, the Earl of Ormond, defeated the English at the Battle of Sark on 23 October. The border conflict continued in the summer of 1449, when English forces burned Dunbar and Dumfries; in retaliation, Douglas himself led a Scottish army to attack Alnwick. A truce between Scotland and England was declared in November 1449. Amid these events, and worsening English reversals in the Hundred Years' War, the traditional Franco-Scottish alliance was renewed at Tours in 1448.

Discussion of James II's marriage was prevalent by 1448. This would be a significant event, signalling the king's assumption of power. Scottish ambassadors approached Charles VII of France in 1448, requesting a French bride for James II, but Charles referred them instead to Philip the Good, Duke of Burgundy. Negotiations ensued for the king's marriage to one of the daughters of Arnold, Duke of Guelders, Philip's ally. Margaret of Guelders was initially proposed as the king's bride, but was replaced by her elder sister, Mary of Guelders, in subsequent negotiations. Preliminary celebrations of the marriage included a tournament at Stirling, held before James II and his court in February 1449, in which Jacques de Lalaing, the Burgundian tournament champion, competed against James, Master of Douglas. The marriage was formally agreed on 1 April, and Mary sailed for Scotland.

== Struggle for authority ==
James and Mary were married in Holyrood Abbey on 3 July 1449. The royal wedding was followed by elaborate celebrations, described in detail by Mathieu d'Escouchy. James granted Mary the earldoms of Strathearn and Atholl, among other lands, as her dower, but struggled to provide its full negotiated value of 10,000 écus. Amid these circumstances, James borrowed money from Robert Livingston, the wealthy comptroller. The king was obligated to repay his debt to Livingston by the following spring, and may have sought to avoid this burden. Apart from his financial concerns, James may have felt threatened by a recent marital alliance between the Livingston family and John, Earl of Ross and Lord of the Isles. These factors led the king to attack the Livingston family in September 1449. Prominent members of the family were arrested, and Robert Livingston himself was executed. The Auchinleck chronicle described these events as a "gret ferlie", or great wonder, indicating general surprise at the king's actions. James summoned parliament to Edinburgh in January 1450 to forfeit the Livingstons.

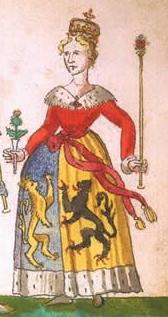
Mary of Guelders, whom James II married in 1449. The king's marriage signalled the beginning of his personal rule.

James's destruction of the Livingstons marked his emergence as an independent force in Scottish politics. Douglas, the Livingstons' former ally, supported James's actions, and was rewarded in the parliament of 1450 with various royal grants. James's assumption of personal rule witnessed the return of the Crichton family, Douglas's former enemies, to positions of influence at court. Douglas was apparently reconciled with William Crichton and Bishop Kennedy of St Andrews, and departed Scotland in October 1450 to travel to Rome for the papal jubilee. Douglas was accompanied by a large entourage during his journey to Rome, which included visits to the courts of Burgundy, France, and England. James may have been disturbed by Douglas's journey, which reinforced his family's traditional influence in western Europe. James's continued financial difficulties also provided a source of friction with Douglas. Seeking new income, the king attempted to claim the lands of his late aunt, Margaret, Duchess of Touraine, in Galloway, despite having recently confirmed them in Douglas's possession.

Douglas returned to Scotland in April 1451. James reacted to Douglas's return with hostility, raising an army and advancing to the Ettrick Forest, where he destroyed the earl's castle of Craig Douglas. Douglas, who had recently visited the court of Henry VI of England, sought English support in his confrontation with the king. James accepted a compromise with Douglas, who made symbolic demonstrations of his loyalty in parliament in July 1451. This compromise was a humiliation for James, who was forced to pardon Douglas and confirm his march wardenships. The crisis had likely improved Douglas's standing in Scotland, while James now seemed vulnerable.

=== Murder at Stirling ===
James's attitude toward Douglas was further affected by events in northern Scotland. John, Earl of Ross, attacked the castles of Inverness, Urquhart, and Ruthven in March 1451. Ross's actions were influenced by his father-in-law, James Livingston, who escaped from royal custody around this time. Ross's attack on royal castles created new tension between the king and Douglas. A private alliance between Douglas, Ross, and Alexander, Earl of Crawford, perhaps agreed as early as 1446, now became relevant. Douglas was unwilling to support James against Ross, despite the king's grant in October of the earldom of Wigtown, originally intended for the queen's dower. Douglas may have deliberately broken the truce with England around this time, in a further challenge to the king's authority.

James's relationship with Douglas was sufficiently hostile by February 1452 for the earl to demand letters of safe conduct to attend court. James and Douglas dined together at Stirling on the evening of 22 February. When they had finished dinner, James asked Douglas to dissolve his alliance with the earls of Ross and Crawford. Douglas refused, whereupon an argument broke out. James stabbed Douglas twice with a knife, after which the king's attendants joined in the murder, one of them striking Douglas on the head with a poleaxe. James's murder of a subject under his own explicit protection was a serious blow to his status and credibility. Douglas's death was unprecedented in recent history; its closest parallel was perhaps the assassination of John the Fearless in France in 1419. The sudden killing risked turning the persistent crisis of royal authority into open civil war.

=== Civil war (1452–1455) ===
The murdered earl was succeeded by his brother, James, 9th Earl of Douglas, who sought revenge against the king. The new earl burned the burgh of Stirling in March 1452, after having the royal safe conduct dragged through the streets by a horse. James's inability to defend Stirling was a sign of his relative weakness at this time. James's position began to improve when the royalist Alexander, Earl of Huntly, defeated the Earl of Crawford at Brechin on 18 May. The king had feared Crawford's potential support for the Douglases. James summoned parliament in June and obtained a formal exoneration from the three estates for his murder of Earl William. James's exoneration allowed him to prepare for further conflict with the Douglas family. The earls of Douglas, Moray, and Ormond renounced their allegiance to James during the parliament, and Douglas entered negotiations with England around this time. James responded by postponing parliament and summoning a large army to Pentland Muir to campaign against the Douglases.

The royal campaign of 1452 was unsuccessful. James led his army to Peebles, Selkirk, and Dumfries, intending to attack Douglas possessions in the Ettrick Forest and intimidate the earl's supporters. The king's undisciplined forces destroyed the countryside, attacking the lands of Douglas adherents and royalists alike. The Douglas family remained entrenched in its network of castles, and James was forced to dismiss his army after only two weeks. James now faced increasing pressure to reach a settlement with the Earl of Douglas. Terms between James and Douglas were reached on 28 August. Douglas forgave James for the murder of his brother, and James received Douglas back into the royal peace. Further negotiations between king and earl led to a second agreement, signed at Lanark in January 1453. James recognised the weakness of his position and made a series of concessions to Douglas. The "Lanark bond" was effectively a royal surrender; after two years of intermittent conflict, James had failed to defeat the Douglases.

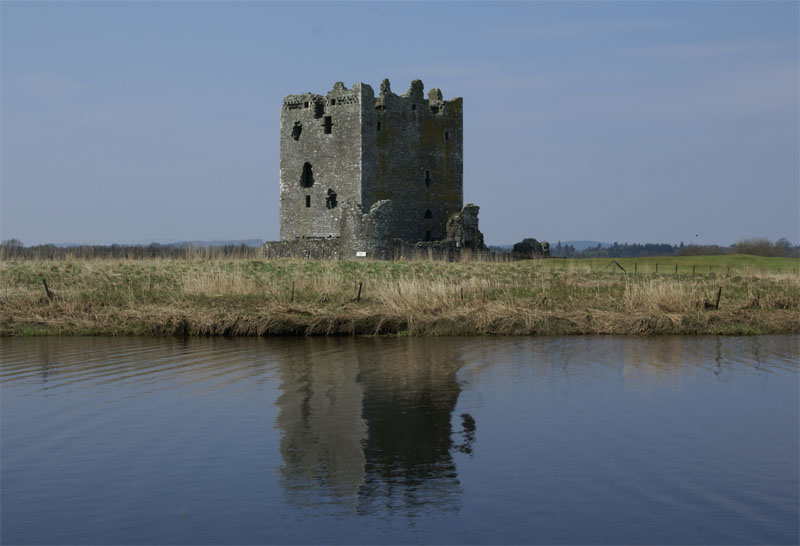
The ruins of Threave Castle, which James II besieged in 1455 at the conclusion of his war with the Douglas family.

James sought to restore his relationship with Douglas in the wake of the Lanark bond, appointing the earl to lead negotiations with England in 1453. A period of apparent harmony ensued, although Douglas maintained his distance from the royal court. Crawford's death in the same year led Douglas to renew his alliance with the Earl of Ross in May 1454. Ross launched a large raid in the Firth of Clyde shortly after this meeting, likely with Douglas's cooperation. Ross's men, led by Donald Balloch, plundered the king's lands of Inverkip and the Isle of Arran. James was able to negotiate with Ross in the wake of the raid, and gained the earl's promise to cease his support for Douglas. The king's difficulties in 1454 were worsened by a sudden dispute with James Crichton, the eldest son of George, Earl of Caithness. James briefly besieged Crichton's stronghold of Blackness Castle, but abandoned the campaign after reaching a private agreement with Crichton. James may have accepted this compromise in fear of Douglas's intervention in the conflict.

A dispute between James and Douglas over the barony of Dalkeith sparked their final confrontation in 1455. The king and earl supported opposing descendants of James Douglas, 1st Lord Dalkeith, who were competing for control of Dalkeith. Douglas plundered the estates of Lord Saltoun, James's justiciar, prompting James to retaliate by destroying Douglas's castle at Inveravon. After gathering a new army, James captured Abercorn Castle and executed the garrison's leaders. Douglas's allies largely abandoned him during James's siege of Abercorn. Douglas himself travelled south to seek English aid against the king, while his brothers led an army against royalists in Annandale. This campaign led to disaster at Arkinholm on 1 May 1455, when a force of local landowners defeated the Douglas brothers. Moray was killed in the battle and Ormond captured, later to be executed. John, Lord of Balvenie, escaped to England to join the Earl of Douglas in exile. James followed this success by capturing Threave Castle, ending the resistance of the Douglas family.

== Dominant rule ==
A meeting of parliament in August 1455 confirmed James's victory, disinheriting the Douglas family for treason and allowing the king to seize their lands. The forfeit Douglas lands provided a significant source of new income for the Scottish monarchy. James was able to distribute various earldoms, many of them new creations, among loyal members of the nobility. In the years after 1457, James created the earldoms of Argyll, Marischal, Morton, and Rothes for various minor lords. James also sought to provide suitable estates for his four sons. The king's eldest son, also named James, was already styled as Duke of Rothesay, while his second son, Alexander, had been given the title of Duke of Albany by 1458. James's third son, David, received the former Douglas earldom of Moray before his death in infancy. James acquired the earldom of Mar for his fourth son, John, in 1459, after a protracted legal dispute with Thomas, Lord Erskine, who had attempted to claim the earldom.

=== Domestic policy ===
James seems to have been a more active king than his father, issuing charters from thirty-three different locations during his personal rule compared to his father's fourteen. Unlike his father, James spent little on royal residences; he has been described as "more interested in improving his fortresses than his palaces." James may have expanded Holyrood Palace after his marriage to Mary of Guelders in 1449. Falkland Palace ultimately became James's favoured residence; a new gatehouse was built at the palace during the 1450s, while Falkland became a royal burgh in 1458.

James enjoyed good relations with the Scottish clergy. The king employed clergymen as his regular councilors, among whom George Shoreswood, Bishop of Brechin, appointed as chancellor in 1456, was the most prominent. James promoted Shoreswood's episcopal career, and also rewarded other loyal clerics such as Thomas Spens and Ninian Spot, who had served as diplomats and legal officials. James took the University of Glasgow under his personal protection in 1453, after supporting the efforts of its founder, William Turnbull, Bishop of Glasgow, to gain papal recognition. A provincial council held at Perth in 1459 granted James the right to appoint the holders of benefices.

Parliament met regularly in the years after 1455, and at least one general council, that of 1456, was also convened during this period. James's parliaments passed legislation that touched upon various aspects of contemporary Scottish society. The parliament of August 1455, which disinherited the Douglas family, passed sumptuary laws establishing correct standards of dress to be worn at future meetings. The parliament of 1458 passed laws regulating wolf hunting, the planting of agricultural land, and the devaluation of silver currency. This assembly also sought to discourage the playing of football and golf in favour of archery practice. The statute against golf is notable as the first reference to the sport in Scottish history.

James's unpopular policy of granting pardons, or remissions, upon payment of a fee became relevant during the parliament of 1458. The king had offered widespread remissions to relatives and supporters of John, Earl of Ross, who had previously attacked royal lands in support of the Douglas family. James granted over 300 remissions during a justice ayre to Aberdeen, Elgin, and Inverness in 1457. James's usage of chamberlain ayres to raise revenue from the burghs was also controversial. The parliament of 1458 responded by enacting judicial reforms, seeking in part to ensure that recipients of remissions could still be judged in court. New judges drawn from parliament would also be appointed to try civil cases. In a veiled rebuke of James's recent policies, parliament reminded him specifically to observe these reforms. Parliament sat again in 1459 and 1460, but few records survive of these meetings.

=== Foreign policy ===
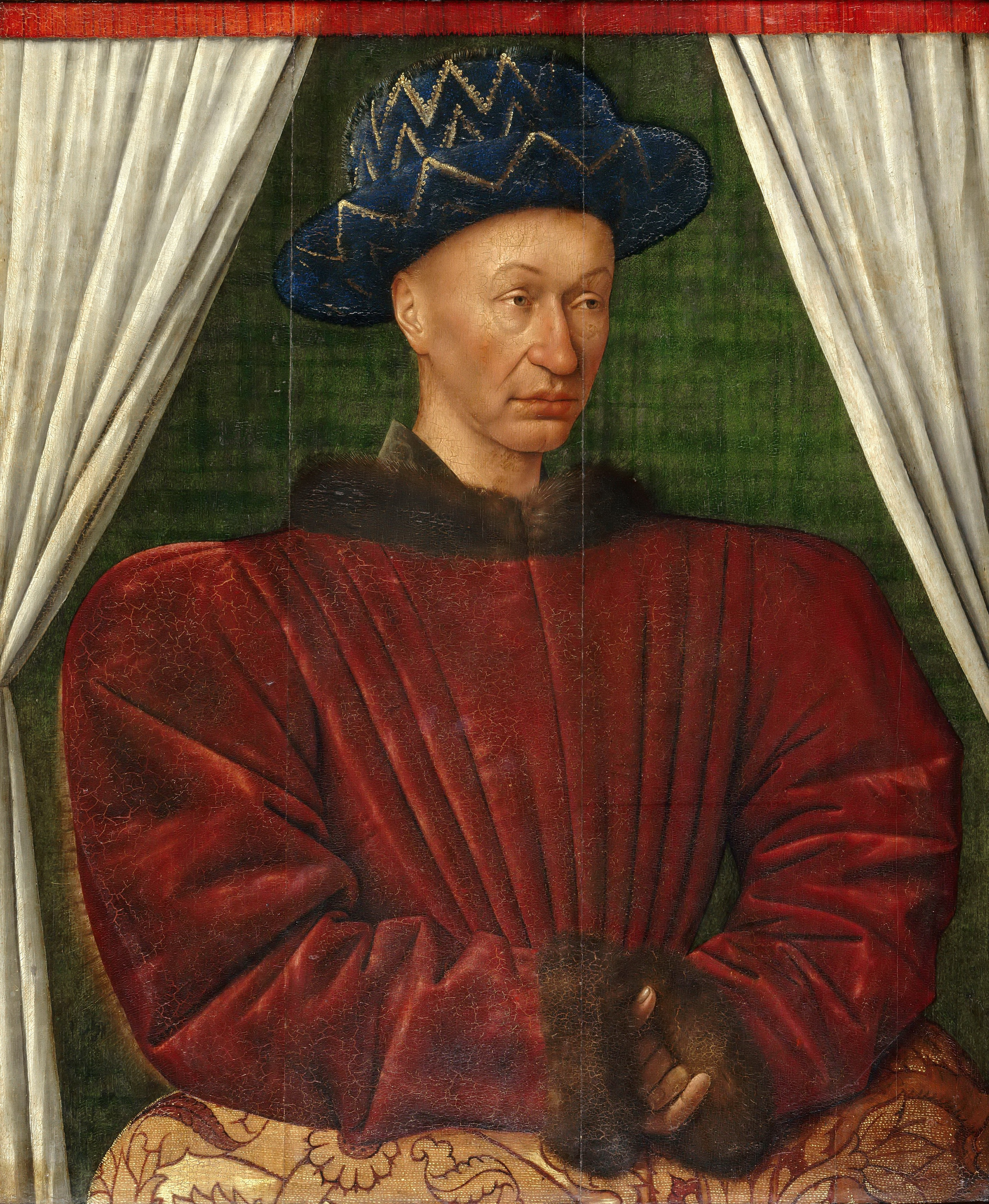
Charles VII of France, James II's principal foreign ally; the relationship between the two men was ambivalent.

France remained Scotland's premier foreign ally during James's reign. The Auld Alliance between the two kingdoms had been renegotiated as recently as 1448. James maintained a correspondence with Charles VII of France during his campaign against the Douglas family in 1455, and offered to act as mediator in a dispute between the French king and his son, Louis, the following year. James attempted to claim the French county of Saintonge in 1458, but was rebuffed by Charles VII. The county had been promised to James's father in 1428, in exchange for the service of a Scottish expeditionary force in the ongoing war between France and England. As this army had never been raised, Charles VII refused further negotiations over Saintonge. James's failure to acquire Saintonge did not end Scottish interest in the county, and renewed negotiations over its possession were attempted during his son's reign.

The Scottish alliance with France diminished in scope at the end of the 1450s, as James was unable to secure French assistance for his intermittent conflict with England. James wrote to Charles VII in 1456, asserting that ongoing disputes between Henry VI of England and Richard, Duke of York, provided an opportunity to invade England. The French king was unwilling to undertake a new war, although James launched an attack on Northumberland regardless. James explained in correspondence with Charles VII that he wished to construct a wider alliance against England. He appointed ambassadors to negotiate an alliance with Henry IV of Castile in 1458. The driving factor in this alliance was the mutual threat to Scottish and Castilian merchants posed by English privateers. James also conducted diplomacy with the Duchy of Milan, probably to seek Milanese support in his projected coalition against England.

James's familial links with the Duchy of Brittany, where his elder sister, Isabella, had married Francis I of Brittany, formed another dimension of his diplomacy with Charles VII. James attempted to intervene in the Breton succession after Francis' death, protesting to Charles VII in 1453 over the exclusion of his nieces, Margaret and Marie, in favour of Peter II. James claimed guardianship over his nieces and petitioned Charles VII for partial control of the duchy's finances. He also pressured his sister to return to Scotland and remarry; Isabella refused, claiming that her original dowry had never been paid.

Relations between Scotland and France were further affected by Christian I of Denmark, who negotiated an alliance with Charles VII in May 1456. Christian I, who was also King of Norway, began to appeal to the French king for assistance in enforcing the Treaty of Perth, which had ended a war between Scotland and Norway in 1266. Under the terms of the treaty, the kings of Scotland were obligated to pay a fixed sum annually to the kings of Norway; these payments had been in default for many years. The diplomatic situation worsened in the winter of 1456-57, when the Norwegian governor of Iceland was forcibly detained and robbed on Orkney. Christian I blamed James for the incident, complaining that his governor had been brought to the Scottish court as a prisoner. These events threatened to derail a proposed convention in Paris between Scottish and Danish ambassadors. The convention was ultimately abandoned, although negotiations between Scotland and Denmark continued. James named ambassadors to conclude a "perpetual peace" with Christian I in 1458. In the last years of his reign, James sought control of Orkney and Shetland through the betrothal of his eldest son, the Duke of Rothesay, to Margaret of Denmark, Christian I's daughter. This marriage, and the associated Scottish territorial claims, were ultimately realized a decade later.

=== Relations with England ===
James's victory over the Douglas family in 1455 coincided with the outbreak of the Wars of the Roses, a series of dynastic civil wars in England. An army led by Richard, Duke of York, defeated and captured Henry VI at St Albans in May 1455, killing several nobles loyal to the English king, including James's uncle, the Duke of Somerset. James moved quickly to exploit the resulting instability in England, organising an attack against Berwick-upon-Tweed later in 1455 despite an ongoing Anglo-Scottish truce. Scottish forces were unable to capture Berwick, and the brief campaign was abandoned. It was later reported that English agents disguised as nuncios had convinced James to halt the attack. James formally renounced the Anglo-Scottish truce in May 1456, provoking an angry response from the Duke of York, who now dominated the English government. In a letter to Charles VII the following month, James expressed his belief that York was the rightful king of England.

Having renounced the truce, James attacked Northumberland in August 1456. The Scottish army advanced twenty miles over the English border, destroying multiple towers and fortifications, and returned home with few casualties. James also organised an invasion of the Isle of Man, an English dependency, sending an expeditionary force from Kirkcudbright to attack the island. Little is known about this campaign, although at least one Scottish vessel was shipwrecked. Scottish forces were unable to gain control of the Isle of Man. In retaliation for the Scottish attack, Thomas Stanley led naval forces to raid Kirkcudbright and the West March in 1457. James was determined to continue the war with England, leading a second failed attack on Berwick in February 1457. Margaret of Anjou's increasing dominance of English politics, in opposition to the Duke of York, signalled an improvement in Anglo-Scottish relations later that year. Margaret proposed that James's sisters, Joan and Annabella, should marry Henry and Edmund, the sons of the late Duke of Somerset. Although this proposal was never realised, a new Anglo-Scottish truce was concluded in June 1457.

James's rapprochement with the House of Lancaster ended in 1459, when he concluded a private treaty with the Duke of York. James was preparing for renewed conflict with England by July 1460, and may have supported the Yorkist earls who sailed from Calais to invade England that summer. He sent ambassadors to the O'Neill dynasty of Ulster, likely to gain support for a Scottish attack against England. James was determined to capture Roxburgh Castle, which his father had attacked unsuccessfully in 1436, and assembled a large army for the impending campaign. James's army was well-equipped with artillery, probably including Mons Meg, the heaviest bombard in the British Isles. The Yorkist victory at Northampton on 10 July, and the subsequent political chaos in England, presented James with an ideal opportunity to capture Roxburgh. James led his army to Roxburgh before the end of the month and began besieging the castle.

== Death ==
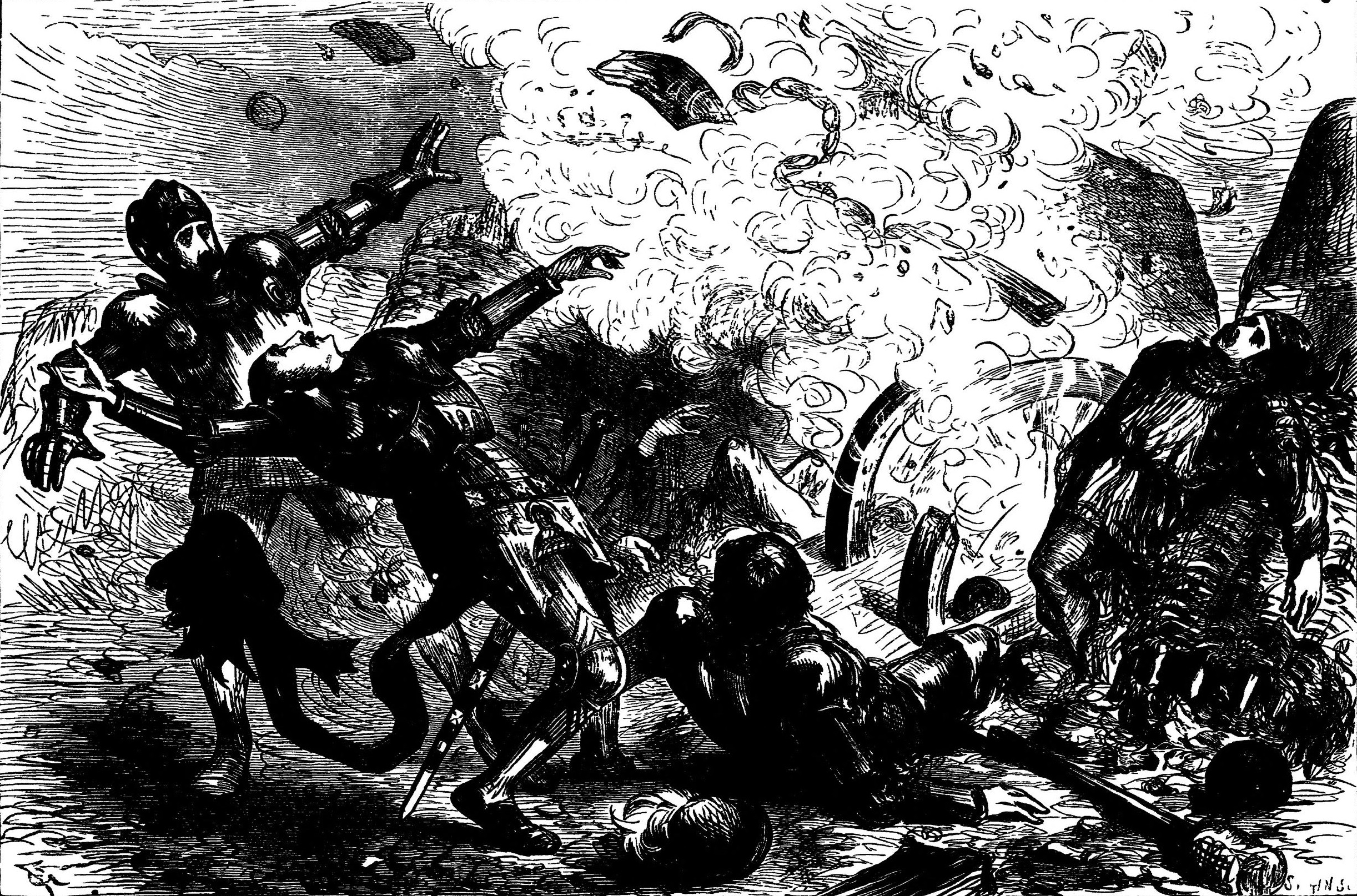
A fanciful depiction of James II's death at Roxburgh Castle in 1460. The king was killed by an exploding bombard.

James died unexpectedly at Roxburgh on 3 August 1460. Standing near one of his bombards, he was killed when the weapon malfunctioned and exploded. A near-contemporary account of James's death reported that a piece of shrapnel severed his thigh, causing a fatal injury. The explosion may have occurred during an artillery salute in honour of the queen's arrival at the siege. John Major, the later historian and philosopher, blamed James for being "over-curious in the matter of engines of war."

The siege of Roxburgh continued despite James's death, and the castle fell to the Scottish army on 8 August. The noblemen present with the army summoned the new king, James III, to Kelso Abbey, where he was crowned on 10 August. James's body, having initially been taken to the friary of St. Peter in Roxburgh, was brought to Holyrood Abbey for burial after the coronation. News of James's death was received with mourning across Scotland, and may have sparked a period of political crisis; one contemporary chronicle reported a "tumult" in Edinburgh. James's widow, Mary of Guelders, soon emerged as the preeminent figure in Scottish politics, despite the claims of various nobles to the regency. Parliament formally appointed Mary as regent for James III in 1461.

== Issue ==
James had seven children with Mary of Guelders, whom he married at Holyrood Abbey on 3 July 1449.

- A premature child, born on 19 May 1450; it lived for only six hours.
- James III (10 July 1451 - 11 June 1488), who succeeded his father as King of Scots.
- Mary (bef May 1452 – c. May 1488), married firstly Thomas Boyd, Earl of Arran, and had issue. Their marriage was annulled in c. 1473, after which she married James Hamilton, 1st Lord Hamilton, and had issue.
- Alexander, Duke of Albany (1454 – 1485)
- David, Earl of Moray (1455/56 – before 18 July 1457)
- John, Earl of Mar (1457 – 1479/80)
- Margaret (c. 1460 – c. 1503), had illegitimate issue by William Crichton, 3rd Lord Crichton.

== Fictional portrayals ==
James II has been depicted in plays, historical novels and short stories. They include:

- The Captain of the Guard (1862), by James Grant. The novel covers events from 1440 to 1452. Mostly covering the conflict of James II with the earls of Douglas. Part of the action takes place far from Scotland, at the court of Arnold, Duke of Guelders, father-in-law to the King.
- Two Penniless Princesses (1891), by Charlotte Mary Yonge. James II is a secondary character. The main characters are his sisters Eleanor, Mary and Joan ("Jean"). The novel covers their travels to foreign courts, including those of young Henry VI of England and René of Anjou.
- The Black Douglas (1899), by Samuel Rutherford Crockett and its sequel Maid Margaret (1905). The two novels cover events from 1439 to 1460, including most of the reign of James II. His conflict with the earls of Douglas is prominently featured. Including James II stabbing William Douglas, 8th Earl of Douglas to death (1452) and James's own death due to a bursting cannon at the siege of Roxburgh (1460). Among the other historical figures depicted are William Douglas, 6th Earl of Douglas and his brother David (mostly their violent deaths in 1440), Margaret Douglas, Fair Maid of Galloway (protagonist of the second novel), Sir Alexander Livingston of Callendar, William Crichton, 1st Lord Crichton, Charles VII of France and his Dauphin (Louis XI and Agnès Sorel. The events take place primarily in Scotland, secondary in France. There is mention of the early phases of the Wars of the Roses (1455–1485) but English events are only "slightly touched".
- James II: Day of The Innocents (2014), by Rona Munro. A co-production between the National Theatre of Scotland, Edinburgh International Festival and the National Theatre of Great Britain. The James Plays — James I, James II and James III — are a trio of history plays by Rona Munro. Each play stands alone as a vision of a country tussling with its past and future. This play focuses on the early life of James II, the developing relationships with the Douglas family and the eventual death of Lord Douglas.
- The Lion's Whelp (1997), by Nigel Tranter. Set during 1437–1460, during the reign of James II of Scotland, the book describes the boy-king's time under regents Archibald Douglas, 5th Earl of Douglas, Lord Crichton and Sir Alexander Livingston, and the plot to kill William Douglas, 6th Earl of Douglas at the "Black Dinner", seen through the eyes of Alexander Lyon, Master and then 2nd Lord of Glamis. The book ends with the death of James.
- Black Douglas (1968), by Nigel Tranter, covers events up to the killing of the 8th Earl of Douglas, is sympathetic to the earl and unsympathetic to James II.
- Niccolò Rising (1986), by Dorothy Dunnett, mentions his intrigues and wars as part of the international milieu of the time, especially as they impact Flanders, the scene of the novel.
- Appears as a background character in the children's fantasy novel In the Keep of Time (1977) by Margaret J. Anderson. His nickname and the birthmark which inspired it are both described, and one of the main characters witnesses the Battle of Roxburgh Castle and the explosion of "the Lion" that kills him.

== Ancestry ==
Ancestors of James II of Scotland

8. Robert II of Scotland
4. Robert III of Scotland
9. Elizabeth Mure
2. James I of Scotland
10. Sir John Drummond, 11th of Lennox
5. Annabella Drummond
11. Mary Montifex
1. James II of Scotland
12. John of Gaunt, 1st Duke of Lancaster
6. John Beaufort, 1st Earl of Somerset
13. Katherine Swynford
3. Joan Beaufort
14. Thomas Holland, 2nd Earl of Kent
7. Margaret Holland
15. Alice FitzAlan

== Sources ==
- Borthwick, Alan R. (2010). "James II (1430-1460)". Oxford Dictionary of National Biography (online ed.). Oxford University Press. doi:10.1093/ref:odnb/14588. (Subscription, Wikipedia Library access or UK public library membership required.) (subscription required)
- Brown, Michael (1998). The Black Douglases: War and Lordship in Late Medieval Scotland, 1300-1455 (Reprinted ed.). East Linton: Tuckwell Press. ISBN 1 86232 036 5.
- Brown, Michael (1994). James I (First ed.). Canongate Press. ISBN 1-898410-40-2.
- MacDougall, Norman (2009). James III (Reprinted ed.). John Donald. ISBN 978 1 904607 87 8.
- McGladdery, Christine (2015). James II (Revised ed.). Edinburgh: John Donald. ISBN 978 1 904607 89 2.
- Nicholson, Ranald (1974). Scotland: The Later Middle Ages (Second ed.). Edinburgh: Mercat Press. ISBN 0901824 844.
- Weir, Alison (1996). Britain's Royal Families: The Complete Genealogy. Pimlico. ISBN 0712674 489.
- Wolffe, Bertram (1981). Henry VI (Second ed.). Yale University Press. ISBN 9780300089264.

James II of Scotland House of Stewart Born: 16 October 1430 Died: 3 August 1460
Regnal titles
Preceded by James I	King of Scots; 1437–1460	Succeeded by James III
Peerage of Scotland
Preceded by Alexander	Duke of Rothesay; 1430–1437	Vacant Title next held by James (III)
