= Richard Holland =

15th-century Scottish cleric and poet

Richard Holland or Richard de Holande (died in or after 1483) was a Scottish cleric and poet, author of the Buke of the Howlat.

== Life ==
Holland was secretary or chaplain to Archibald Douglas, Earl of Moray (c. 1450) and rector of Halkirk, near Thurso. He was afterwards rector of Abbreochy, Loch Ness, and later held a chantry in the cathedral of Norway. He was an ardent partisan of the Douglases, and on their over-throw retired to Orkney and later to Shetland.

He was employed by Edward IV in his attempt to rouse the Western Isles through Douglas agency, and in 1482 was excluded from the general pardon granted by James III to those who would renounce their fealty to the Douglases.

== Works ==
The poem entitled the Buke of the Howlat, written about 1450, shows Holland's devotion to the house of Douglas: "On ilk beugh till embrace Writtin in a bill was O Dowglass, O Dowglass Tender and trewe!" (ii. 400–403). It is dedicated to Lady Elizabeth Douglas at Darnaway Castle in Morayshire. "Thus for ane Dow of Dunbar drew I this Dyte, Dowit with ane Dowglass, and boith war thei dowis."

Sir Walter Scott's judged that the Buke is "a poetical apologue ... without any view whatever to local or natural politics". The poem, which extends to fool lines written in the irregular alliterative rhymed stanza, is a bird-allegory, of the type familiar in Chaucer's Parlement of Foules. It has the incidental interest of showing (especially in stanzas 62 and 63) the antipathy of the "Inglis-speaking Scot" to the "Scots-speaking Gael" of the west, as is also shown in Dunbar's Flyting with Kennedy.

The text of the poem is preserved in the Asloan (c. 1515) and Bannatyne (1568) manuscripts, though the poem is thought to be 50–70 years older than the earlier manuscript. Fragments of an early 16th-century black-letter edition, discovered by D. Laing, are reproduced in the Adversaria of the Bannatyne Club. The poem has been frequently reprinted, by

- Richard Holland, Bangor, 1989
- John Pinkerton, in his Scottish Poems (1792)
- David Laing (Bannatyne Club 1823)
- in "New Club" series, Paisley, 1882)
- the Hunterian Club in their edition of the Bannatyne Manuscript
- A. Diebler (Chemnitz, 1893)
- F. J. Amours in Scottish Alliterative Poems (Scottish Text Society, 1897), pp. 47–81. (See also Introduction pp. xx.-xxxiv.)
