= Auchinleck chronicle =

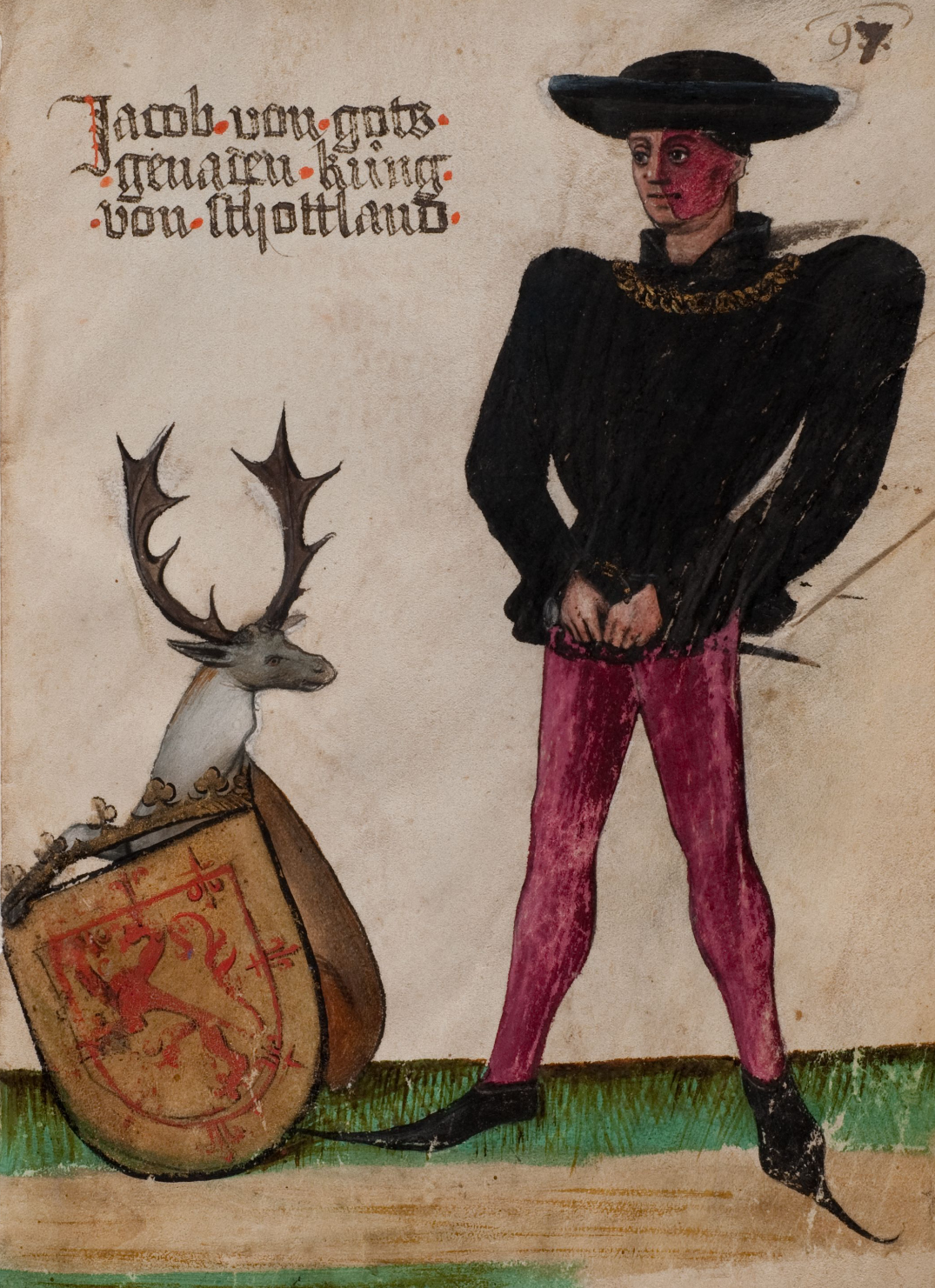
James II of Scotland, depicted in the journal of his contemporary Georg von Ehingen.

The Auchinleck Chronicle, titled in its original manuscript form as Ane Schort Memoriale of the Scottis Corniklis for Addicioun, is a brief history of Scotland during the reign of James II (1437–1460).

It was written in Scots at an unknown date and is preserved only in the Asloan Manuscript of the early sixteenth century.

The title Auchinleck Chronicle comes from the fact that the Asloan Manuscript was formerly owned by the Boswell Family at Auchinleck House in Ayrshire.

The fuller title may be translated into English as A Short History to be Added to the Scots Chronicles.
