= Sweetheart Abbey =

Category A listed building in Dumfries and Galloway, Scotland

Coordinates: 54°58′48.74″N 3°37′7.21″W

- An Abaid Ur
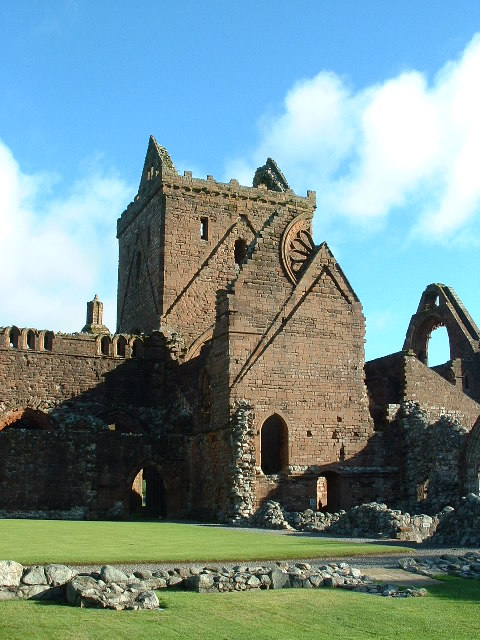
- Interactive map of Sweetheart Abbey

Monastery information
- Full name: Abbey of Dulce Cor
- Other name: New Abbey
- Order: Cistercian
- Established: 1273
- Disestablished: 1624
- Mother house: Dundrennan Abbey
- Dedication: St Mary the Virgin
- Diocese: Diocese of Galloway
- Controlled churches: Buittle; Crossmichael; Kirkcolm; Kirkpatrick-Durham; Lochkindeloch; Wigtown

People
- Founders: Dervorguilla of Galloway; Abbot Henry, S.O.Cist.

Architecture
- Style: Early English

Site
- Location: New Abbey, Dumfries and Galloway, Scotland, United Kingdom
- Visible remains: Abbey church, precinct wall, chapter house

The Abbey of Dulce Cor, better known as Sweetheart Abbey (Gaelic: An Abaid Ur), was a Cistercian monastery founded in 1273 in what is now the village of New Abbey, in the historical county of Kirkcudbrightshire in Dumfries and Galloway, 8 miles (13 km) south of Dumfries.

== History ==
=== Founding ===
The abbey, located on the banks of the New Abbey Pow (river), was founded by Dervorguilla of Galloway, daughter of Alan, Lord of Galloway, in memory of her husband, John de Balliol. After his death, she kept his embalmed heart, contained in a casket of ivory and silver, with her for the rest of her life, and it was buried alongside her when she died. In line with this devotion to her late husband, she named the abbey Dulce Cor (Latin for Sweet Heart). Their son, also John, became King of Scotland, but his reign was tragic and short.

Under the first abbot, Henry, the abbey was built in deep-red, local sandstone in the Early English style. It was founded as a daughter house to the nearby Dundrennan Abbey; thus this novum monasterium (new monastery) became known as the "New Abbey ".

Other abbots included - Henry, 1275; Eric, 1290; John, 1300; Thomas, 1400; William, 1470; Robert, 1503; John, 1539; Gilbert, 1565–1612.

=== Vicissitudes ===
The immediate abbey precincts extended to 30 acres (120,000 m^{2}) and sections of the surrounding wall can still be seen today. The abbey church, dedicated to St Mary the Virgin, in common with all Cistercian monasteries, measures 203 feet (62 m), and the central tower rose to a height of 92 feet (28 m).

The Abbot of Sweetheart was a member of the First Estate and sat ex officio in the Parliament. The Cistercian Order—whose members were commonly known as the White Monks because of the white cowl which they wear over their religious habit—built many great abbeys after their establishment around 1100. Like many of their abbeys, the New Abbey's interests lay not only in prayer and contemplation but in the farming and commercial activity of the area, making it the centre of local life.

During the First War of Scottish Independence, King Edward I of England himself resided at the abbey in 1300, while campaigning in Galloway. After 50 years of warfare in the region, however, the abbey was left in a dilapidated state. The Bishop of Galloway bemoaned Sweetheart's "outstanding and notorious poverty". Archibald Douglas, 3rd Earl of Douglas (1328–1400), often referred to as Archibald the Grim, became a major benefactor of the abbey and financed wholesale repairs and the rebuilding of the abbey complex. The depredations suffered by the abbey in subsequent periods, however, caused the graves of the foundress and her husband to be lost.

The abbey continued in quiet obscurity until it was eventually suppressed in the Scottish Reformation.

=== Suppression ===
Starting in 1565, the Scottish crown placed the abbey under a series of commendatory abbots. The last Cistercian abbot was Gilbert Broun, S.O.Cist. (died 1612), who continued to uphold the Catholic faith long after the Reformation. He was charged several times with enticing to "papistrie" from 1578 to 1605, until finally he was arrested in 1605, in spite of the resistance of the whole countryside, and transported to Edinburgh, where he was tried and sentenced to exile. In 1624, the last of the monks died and the abbey buildings and land passed into the hands of Sir Robert Spottiswoode, son of the Archbishop of St Andrews, who assumed the title of Lord of New Abbey.

When, in 1633, King Charles I established the Diocese of Edinburgh, he pleaded with Spottiswoode to relinquish the lands of New Abbey, which he wanted to grant to the new diocese. Though Spottiswoode agreed, he was not paid for the lands, and when the royal grant to the diocese was cancelled, the king restored the estate back to Spottiswoode in 1641. He was soon forced into exile, however, so the estate continued in possession of the Crown.

== Burials ==
- John de Balliol and his wife Dervorguilla of Galloway
- James Carruthers (1759–1832) was a Catholic priest and historian.
- Eric Drummond, 7th Earl of Perth (1876- 1951).
- Hon. Angela Mary Constable-Maxwell, daughter of the 11th Lord Herries of Terregles, Countess of Perth, (1877Marmaduke Constable-Maxwell, 11th Lord Herries of Terregles - 1965 ) wife of the 7th Earl of Perth.
- William Paterson (banker) founder of the Bank of England. (1658 - 1719)

== Current status ==
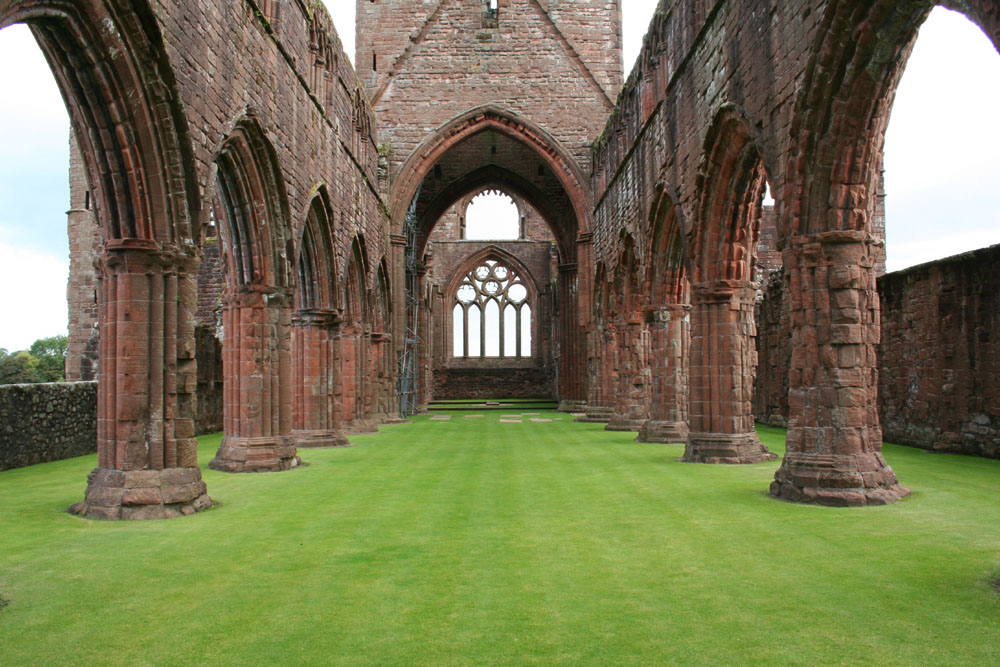
Looking eastwards, the impressive nave of the abbey church leading (under the dramatic bell tower) to the chancel, with its richly carved and traceried windows. Above the rows of pillars, the triforia can just be seen.

The village which stands next to the ruins today, is now known as New Abbey. At the other end of the main street is Monksmill, a corn mill. Although the present buildings date from the late 18th century, there was an earlier mill built by and for the monks of the abbey which serviced the surrounding farms.

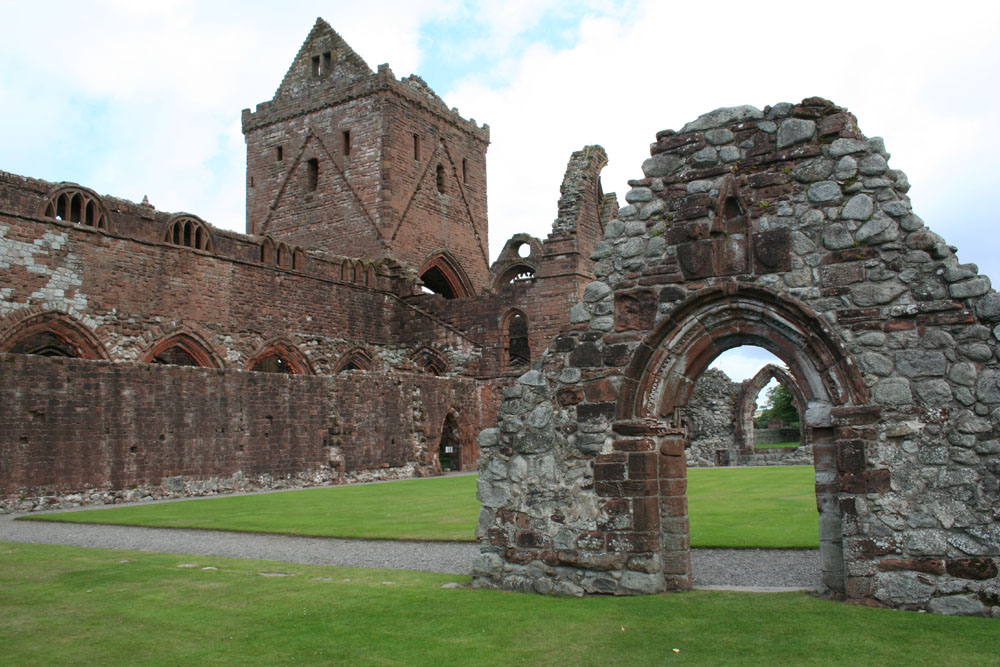
Sweetheart Abbey entrance through the much altered archway in the abbey precincts which extended to 30 acres.

The abbey ruins dominate the skyline today and one can only imagine how it and the monks would have dominated early medieval life as farmers, agriculturalists, horse and cattle breeders. Surrounded by rich and fertile grazing and arable land, they became increasingly expert and systematic in their farming and breeding methods. Like all Cistercian abbeys, they made their mark, not only on the religious life of the district but on the ways of local farmers and influenced agriculture in the surrounding areas.

A 14th century prayer book known as The Sweetheart Abbey Breviary is now in the National Library of Scotland in Edinburgh.

== See also ==
- Abbot of Sweetheart, for a list of abbots and commendators
- List of places in Dumfries and Galloway
