= Abbot of Sweetheart =

The Abbot of Sweetheart (later Commendator of Sweetheart; also Abbot of New Abbey) was the head of the Cistercian monastic community of Sweetheart Abbey, in the ancient province of Galloway in the present area of Dumfries and Galloway, founded by monks from Dundrennan Abbey with the patronage of Derbhfhorghaill inghean Ailein (a.k.a. "Dervorguilla Balliol"), Lady of Galloway, about 1275. The following are a list of abbots and commendators.

== List of abbots ==
- Henry, S.O.Cist., 1273 - 1280
- John, S.O.Cist., 1280 x 1290 - 1296
- Thomas, S.O.Cist., 1356 - 1404
- John, S.O.Cist., c.1409
- William Greenlaw, S.O.Cist., 1448 -1463
- Alexander Tyningham, S.O.Cist., 1486
- James Ruche, S.O.Cist., 1486
- Robert Greenlaw, S.O.Cist., 1515
- Herbert Browne, S.O.Cist., 1523 - 1530
- Richard Brown, S.O.Cist., 1530-1532
- Robert Arnot, S.O.Cist., 1532
- Herbert, S.O.Cist., 1538
- John Brown, S.O.Cist., 1538 - 1565
- Gilbert Broun, S.O.Cist., 1565 - 1612

== List of abbot-commendators ==
- Gilbert Brown, 1565
- William Leslie, 1586
- Robert Maxwell, x 1612
- Robert Spottiswood, 1612 -1624

== Bibliography ==
- Cowan, Ian B. & Easson, David E., Medieval Religious Houses: Scotland With an Appendix on the Houses in the Isle of Man, Second Edition, (London, 1976), pp. 208–10
- Watt, D.E.R. & Shead, N.F. (eds.), The Heads of Religious Houses in Scotland from the 12th to the 16th Centuries, The Scottish Records Society, New Series, Volume 24, (Edinburgh, 2001), p. 78

== See also ==
- Sweetheart Abbey
