= Newman & Guardia =

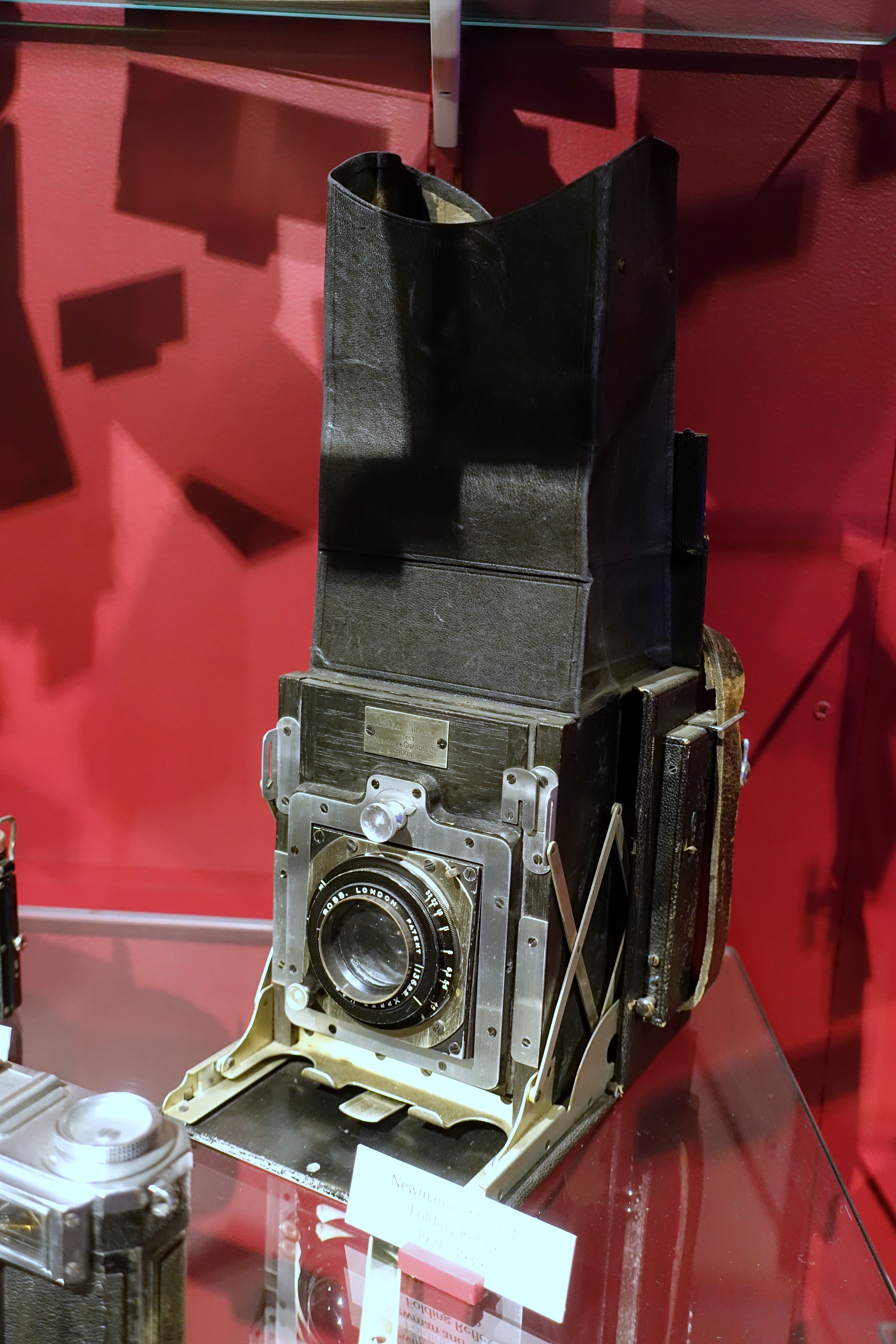
Newman & Guardia Folding Reflex camera, 1921-1939, in the Fox Talbot Museum

Newman & Guardia was a British company that manufactured cameras and other fine instruments including early aircraft instruments.

The company was in existence between 1893 and 1956 and continued into the 196O's with premises in the Templefields Industrial Estate, Edinburgh Way, Harlow, Essex.It was acquired by Debrie Lawley around 1970.

It was a prolific producer of cameras aimed at a knowledgeable and demanding clientele. Although most were hand-held plate cameras, the company also produced some field, roll-film and specialist cameras.

The following is a list of models known to have been produced:

- Nydia (1900)
- Cyclops (manufactured by Nettel)
- Single Lens reflex
- Folding reflex
- Long body Reflex camera
- New ideal Sibyl
- New Special Sibyl
- Postcard Sibyl
- Baby Sibyl
- Sibyl Deluxe
- Sibyl Excelsior
- Sibyl imperial Mod. 8 +9
- Sibyl stereo
- Sibyl Vitesse
- Special Sibyl
- Special stereoscopic roll film Sibyl (custom made)
- Trellis
- Universal Twin Lens Pattern
- Universal Pattern B
- Universal Special B
- Universal Deluxe
- Stereo Universal camera
- W.1. M.P.H. No. 1805 BW mark IV A – Air speed indicator
