= Buke of the Howlat =

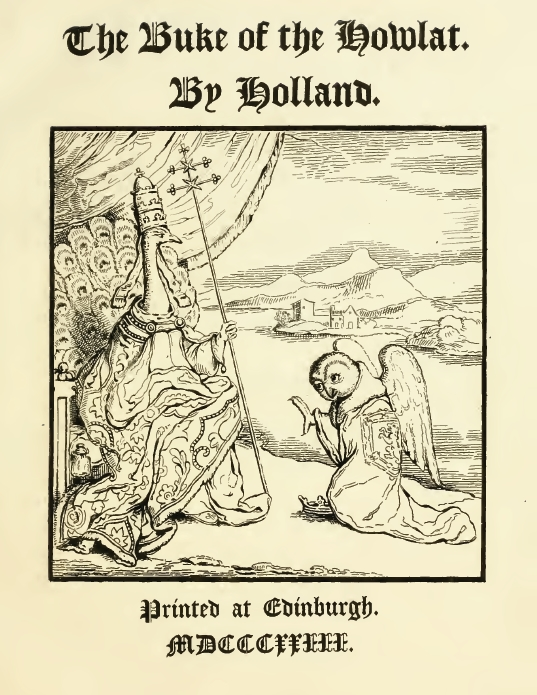
The Howlat petitions the Pope of birds. An engraving from the printed edition of 1823, published by the Bannatyne Club.

The Buke of the Howlat, often referred to simply as The Howlat, is a humorous 15th century Scots poem by Richard Holland.

== Description ==
The poem is a comic allegory in which all the characters are birds with human attributes, with a howlet, or owl, the protagonist. The symbolism is debatable but two of its purposes are clear; it serves as a moral fable warning against vanity and excessive pride, and it is also a piece of propaganda praising the Douglas dynasty of Scots nobles.

The poem was dedicated to Lady Elizabeth Douglas at Darnaway Castle in Morayshire.

Other themes dealt with in the work include satire of the bureaucracy of the medieval church, and the mocking of the Highland Scots and their language.

The Howlat is a long, narrative piece full of exuberant comic detail. It is written in rhyming verse heavy with alliteration. The style is similar to Chaucer's Parlement of Foules.

The text is preserved in the Asloan and Bannatyne manuscripts. A printed transcript, based mainly on the Asloan text was published by the Bannatyne Club in 1823.

== Synopsis ==
An owl, unhappy with his appearance, decides to appeal to the Pope (a peacock), to be made more handsome. The Pope, assisted by his secretary (a turtledove) and his herald (a swallow) calls a council to discuss the matter. Church dignitaries assemble first, followed by lay representatives led by the Emperor, an eagle.

A long interlude of praise for the Douglas family follows. It includes a retelling of the career of Sir James Douglas.

The narrative resumes with the Pope holding a banquet for his guests. A series of entertainers are presented in vivid comic detail; The mavis leads a band of musicians; the jay performs juggling; the rook, as a highland bard, gives a recitation in mock Gaelic before being driven out by two fools (a peewit and a gowk). The fools then quarrel with each other.

After the feast, the council agrees to meet the owl's request and, after praying to Dame Nature she descends from heaven and arranges a beautiful new plumage for the owl. Each of the assembled birds is required to give up one of his feathers.

Due to his grand new appearance, the owl becomes extremely arrogant and the birds pray again to Dame Nature; this time they request that the owl's gift be revoked. Nature agrees and, deprived of his fine plumage, the owl reflects bitterly on the lesson he has learnt about pride and vanity.

== Representative passage ==
The following stanzas describe some of the entertainment at the birds' feast. They open with the entrance of the bard, who demands food and drink in exchange for his recitation on Irish royal genealogy. He speaks a mixture of mock Gaelic and pidgin Scots.

Sae come the Ruke with a rerd, and a rane roch,
A bard owt of Irland with 'Banachadee!',
Said, 'Gluntow guk dynyd dach hala mischy doch,
Raike here a rug of the rost, or so sall ryive the.
Mich macmory ach mach mometir moch loch,
Set here doune! Gif here drink! Quhat Dele alis the?
O Deremyne, O Donnall, O Dochardy drochm'
Thir ar his Irland kingis of the Irischerye,
O Knewlyn, O Conochor, O Gregre Makgrane,
The Schenachy, the Clarschach,
The Ben schene, the Ballach,
The Crekery, the Corach,
So kennis thaim ilkane.'

The bard is heckled by the Rural Dean a raven, but then gives as good as he gets in a Scots which is suddenly very eloquent. The blushing raven retires from the stage.

Mony lesingis he maid wald let for no man,
To speik quhill he spokin had sparit no thingis.
The dene rurale the Ravyn reprovit him then,
Bad him his lesingis leif befor thai lordingis.
The barde worth brane wod, and bitterly couth ban,
'How Corby messinger', quoth he, 'with sorowe now syngis,
Thow ischit out of Noyes ark, and to the erd wan,
Taryit as a tratour, and brocht na tythingis,
I sall ryive the, Ravyne, baith guttis and gall!'
The dene rurale worthit reid,
Stawe for schame of the steid.
The barde held a grete pleid,
In the hie hall.

The Bard is then unceremoniously ejected from the hall by two fools.

In come twa flyrand fulis with a fand-fair,
The Peewit and the gukkit Gowk, and gaed hiddy giddy,
Rushit baith to the bard, and ruggit his hair,
Callit him thrys-thievesnek, to thraw in a widdy,
Thai fylit fra the fortope to the fut thar.
The barde, smaddit lyke a smaik smorit in a smedy,
Ran fast to the dure, and gaif a gret rair,
Socht wattir to wesche him thar out in ane eddy.
The lordis leuch apon loft, and lyking thai had,
That the barde was so bet,
The fulis fonde in the flet,
And mony mowis at mete,
on the flure maid.
