= Gascon campaign (1294–1303) =

Gascon Campaign (1294–1303)
- Part of Gascon War
Date	1294–1303
Location	Aquitaine (Guyenne and Gascony)
Result	Treaty of Paris: French occupation ended with royal marriages. Aquitaine becomes a fief of France.

Belligerents
Kingdom of France	Kingdom of England

Commanders and leaders
Philip IV of France; Robert II, Count of Artois; Charles, Count of Valois; Guy, Marshall of France; Raoul, Constable of France; Roger-Bernard, Count of Foix	Edward I of England; John St John; John of Brittany; Edmund of Lancaster; Henry de Lacy, Earl of Lincoln

Locations
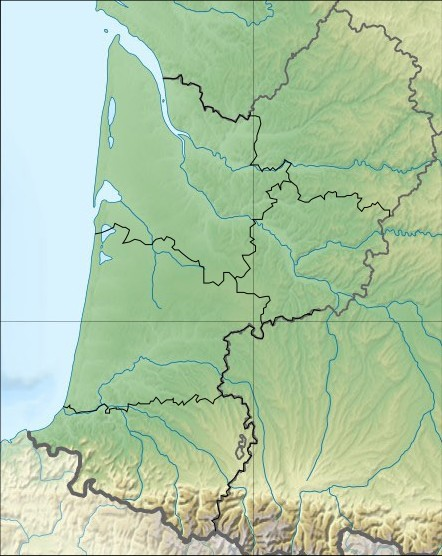
Locations in Gascony and Aquitaine

The Gascon campaign of 1294 to 1303 was a military conflict between English and French forces over the Duchy of Aquitaine, including the Duchy of Gascony. The Duchy of Aquitaine was held in fief by King Edward I of England as a vassal of King Philip IV of France. Starting with a fishing fleet dispute and then naval warfare, the conflict escalated to open warfare between the two countries. In spite of a French military victory on the ground, the war ended when the Treaty of Paris was signed in 1303, which restored the status quo. The war was a premise to future tensions between the two nations culminating in the Hundred Years' War.

== Background ==
The Duchy of Aquitaine was a personal possession of King Edward I. Edward I had spent his youth in Gascony and also spent three years in Aquitaine between 1286 and 1289. The King of England held the duchy as a vassal of the King of France, since the Treaty of Paris in 1259. Aquitaine and Gascony represented an important source of income and wine for England. King Philip IV continued to strengthen his suzerainty over the feudal fiefs, regularly taking advantage of his ability to allow Gascons to appeal English law at the French court.

In 1293, a fight between sailors off the Gascon coast, between Gascon and Norman fishing boats, degenerated into open naval war between the two navies of England and France. An Anglo-Gascon fleet attacked a French fleet off the Pointe Saint-Mathieu on 15 May, and then sacked the French port of La Rochelle. The Normans appealed to the King of France for assistance. Ongoing reprisals taken by French ships against the Gascons and English revenge attacks on French ships, led Philip IV to summon Edward I before his court. Edward I sent his younger brother Edmund of Lancaster and Henry de Lacy, Earl of Lincoln, to negotiate a truce with the French King.

John St John had been appointed as Edward I's lieutenant in Gascony and upon arrival in Gascony, St John set about strengthening and provisioning the English controlled fortified towns and castles, and providing adequate garrisons for them. A settlement was reached between Edward I and Philip IV, allowing the temporary French occupations of the English controlled fortified towns and castles. On 3 February 1294, orders were given by Edward I to allow the French to temporarily take possession of the Gascon strongholds. Upon the French taking processions of the castles, the English sold off the provisions and stores that they had collected. Philip IV, however, then summoned Edward I on 21 April, to appear before the French court. Edward I was forfeited of Aquitaine, Gascony and other French possessions on 19 May, for failure to appear personally before the French court. A French army was then sent to occupy the confiscated territories. Edward I renounced his homage to Philip IV and began preparations for war.

== English expedition of 1294–1295 ==
The English were delayed in sending an army to Gascony, due to a revolt in Wales by Madog ap Llywelyn. The expedition was led by Edward's nephew John of Brittany and John St John. The English army was finally able to leave Portsmouth on 9 October 1294, raiding Pointe Saint-Mathieu and Île de Ré. The English fleet arrived off Aquitaine and went up the Garonne River and seized the town of Castillon on 27 October. Travelling up the Gironde estuary from the 28 October, the English captured the towns of Macau (31 October), Bourg (1 November) and Blaye. The fleet then sailed up the Garonne to Bordeaux, however was unable to capture the town after ten days of siege, before the fleet went up stream to Rions, which was captured, along with Podensac and Villeneuve.

St John left John of Brittany at Rions and travelled to Bayonne, and laid siege to the town. On 1 January 1295, the French garrison was driven into the castle by the citizens of Bayonne and the citizens opened the town gates to him. The castle surrendered on 9 January. After the successes of the English army, many Gascons joined the English army.

== French expedition of 1295 ==
Philip IV sent his brother Charles of Valois, the Marshal of France, Guy I of Clermont and the Constable of France, Raoul II of Clermont into Aquitaine and Gascony at the head of a large army that won back most of the English conquests in the Garonne valley. Both John of Brittany and St John defended Rions, but due to the fall of the neighbouring towns and discontent between the English troops, they abandoned Rions, which the French entered on 8 April. The English offensive was halted and the French army retook Podensac and then Saint-Sever in June 1295 after 13 weeks of siege. Saint-Sever was not long held by the French before being retaken by the English, under Hugh de Vere. Charles de Valois left command of the French army to Roger-Bernard III, Count of Foix. Only Bourg and Blaye remained in English hands in the north of the duchy and Bayonne and Saint-Sever in the south.

== English and French expeditions of 1296–1297 ==
An English relief force was mustered in England, however was delayed from sailing due to a revolt in Scotland in 1295, finally leaving on 4 January 1296 from Plymouth. The army was commanded by Edward I's brother Edmond of Lancaster and Henry de Lacy, Earl of Lincoln. Messengers were sent to Brittany, requesting passage through Brittany and to gather provisions, however the messengers were hanged by the Bretons, and in revenge Edmund plundered Brittany on his way to Gascony. The English army arrived in Gascony in March 1296. They landed at Castillon in the Médoc (not to be confused with Castillon-la-Bataille in the Dordogne. The horses were landed and the army marched seven miles (10 kilometres) inland where it besieged and took the castle at Lesparre-Médoc.

Staying at Bourg and Blaye, the English army was joined by many Gascons, swelling Edmund's forces to more than two thousand men-at-arms. The English army advanced on 28 March to Bordeaux, and laid siege to the town. The towns of Langon and Saint-Macaire surrendered to Edmund's forces. With the news of an approaching French army under Robert of Artois, with difficulties in paying his troops, resulting in parts of the army disbanding, the siege of Bordeaux was ended and the English army retired to Bayonne. Edmund of Lancaster died at Bayonne on 5/6 June.

Henry de Lacy, Earl of Lincoln was appointed as the commander of the English army with John St John continuing as Seneschal of Gascony. A siege of the towns of Bordeaux and Dax was undertaken, however after eleven weeks of siege the towns were not captured and the sieges were lifted. The English army, while attempting to resupply the fortress of Bonnegarde, was ambushed by the French army on 2 February 1297. In the Battle of Bonnegarde, St John, leading a division was outnumbered by the attacking French forces, but Henry de Lacy and the second division retreated from the battlefield. When the Gascon contingent ran away St John was defeated and taken prisoner along with ten other to forty knights depending on the sources and the French pursued the other English divisions until nightfall. Henry de Lacy was able to escape and retreated to Bayonne, while Robert of Artois was ordered to travel to Flanders to assist with the English expedition to Flanders.

Bayonne continued to remain the centre of English power. Henry de Lacy carried out a raid towards Toulouse, which lasted till Michaelmas. De Lacy then went back to Bayonne till after Christmas, and about Easter 1298 returned to England.

== Negotiations and peace treaty (1297–1303) ==
Edward I was faced with military failures in Gascony, Scotland and Flanders and together with internal disputes in England about the costly wars and that the English barons had little motivation for a war on the Continent, Edward I and sought a truce with Philip IV, through mediation via Pope Boniface VIII, which was signed on 9 October 1297. Philip also desired peace in order to focus on the Franco-Flemish War, especially after the damaging loss at the Battle of the Golden Spurs. The truce was renewed several times during the negotiations, including in the 1299 Treaties of Montreuil and Chartres. The truce arranges the marriages of Edward I and Margaret, sister of Philip IV and between Edward I's son Prince Edward and Philip IV's daughter Isabella. The marriage of Edward I and Margaret occurred in 1299, while the second occurred in 1308. The Treaty of Paris was signed in 1303 which returned Aquitaine to Edward I, in exchange for homage, and ended of the Auld alliance between France and Scotland signed eight years earlier in 1295.

== Aftermath ==
The recurring problems of the King of England doing homage for lands to the King France, added to issues of the succession to French crown, upon the failure of the Capetian line. King Edward III, the child of King Edward II and Isabella of France, claimed the crown of France of his grandfather Philip IV, as the only male descendant. The outbreak of the Hundred Years' War in 1337 was a result of the tension between the two nations.

During this campaign, England was hampered by the problems of supply, financing, and recruitment of armies, which continued to be a problem during the Hundred Years' War.
