= Barrau de Sescas =

Gascon knight in English service

- Born: Gascony
- Title: Joint Lieutenant of Gascony Castellan of Bayonne Bailiff of Labourd
- Military career
- Allegiance: King of England as Duke of Gascony
- Branch: Navy
- Service years: 1295–1304
- Rank: Admiral
- Units: Fleet of Bayonne; Royal household of Edward I
- Conflicts: Gascon War (Gascony & Flanders)

Barrau de Sescas (fl. 1295–1304) was a Gascon knight in English service. In 1295, amid the Gascon War between King Philip IV of France and his lord Edward I, Barrau became the first person to be appointed to the position of admiral by an English king, after Edward I appointed him Admiral of the Fleet of Bayonne. In this role, he escorted merchant convoys and broke a French blockade to provide supplies to the besieged fortresses of Bourg and Blaye. Later in the war, he served with Edward's royal household during the king's 1297–1298 expedition to Flanders. In 1299, he became joint lieutenant of Gascony, although the position was largely notional as most of the duchy was then under French occupation. After the 1303 Treaty of Paris restored Gascony to the English, Barrau was appointed castellan of Bayonne and bailiff of Labourd, serving until 1304.

== Life ==
Barrau de Sescas was Gascon by birth and based in Bayonne, Gascony. He held an estate in Gascony, which was then controlled by the English crown, and was a vassal of the lords of Albret.

On 1 March 1295 Barrau became the first person to be appointed to the title of admiral by an English king when Edward I made him Admiral of the Fleet of Bayonne, during the Gascon War of 1294–1303; it was not until later that year the other commanders of English naval forces were described as admirals. The first appointed as such was Gervase Alard when he was appointed Captain and Admiral of the Fleet of the Cinque Ports. In the early part of the war the Anglo-Gascon forces held maritime supremacy, though Barrau's ships did have to break through a French naval blockade to resupply the fortresses of Bourg and Blaye which were under French siege. Barrau's supplies allowed the fortresses to hold out until a truce was agreed in 1297. His ships also safeguarded English merchant convoys in Gascon waters. Historian N. A. M. Rodger states that Barrau's actions at sea were vital in saving Gascony as an English province as the income from Bayonne's sea trade was key in providing for its defence. Historian Malcolm Vale regards the appointment of Barrau as one of Edward and John II, Duke of Brittany's wisest moves.

Barrau petitioned Edward at Plympton, Devon, in 1297 to complain that he had spent 100 marks more in his role as admiral than he received in wages. Around this time Barrau had charge of the Château d'Aspremont. Later in 1297 Barrau joined Edward's royal household during his expedition against the French in Flanders. There is no evidence that Barrau was retained in the household upon its return to England in 1298. The following year Barrau was one of six Gascon knights awarded a pension by the king. Barrau's pension was financed by land confiscated from foreigners in England and provided 50 pounds chipotenses, a Gascon currency, per annum: a total of around £10 (equivalent to £9,846 in 2025). Also in 1299 Barrau was selected as joint lieutenant of Gascony, with Pey-Arnaut de Vic. He served from 1 November 1299 to 24 July 1302. Barrau was considered an unusually low-ranking courtier for the position, which was usually held by a lord. He was perhaps chosen by the king because Gascony was considered of low importance as it was then mostly under French control. Following the 1303 Treaty of Paris, which restored Gascony to the English crown, Barrau served as castellan of Bayonne and bailiff of Labourd from 5 August 1303 to 11 April 1304. His clerk, Fortz de Pegeres, was out of service by 1305 when he petitioned the king for employment or a pension as his and his brothers' homes in Roquetaillade and Castelnau-de-Sarneis had been destroyed by the French in war.

A road in Bayonne is named after Barrau, the Rue Barreau de Sescars.
