= Battle of Happrew =

1304 battle in the First War of Scottish Independence

Coordinates: 55°39′15″N 3°17′58″W

- Part of the First War of Scottish Independence
Date	c. 20 February 1304
Location	Happrew, near Peebles, Scotland
Result	English victory

Belligerents
Kingdom of Scotland	Kingdom of England

Commanders and leaders
Sir William Wallace; Sir Simon Fraser	Sir John Segrave; Sir William Latimer; Robert the Bruce

The Battle of Happrew was a skirmish which took place around 20 February 1304, during the First War of Scottish Independence. A chevauchée of English knights, which included Robert de Clifford, William de Latimer, and the later Scottish King, Robert the Bruce had been sent south from Dunfermline under Sir John Segrave to locate and capture the rebels Sir William Wallace and Sir Simon Fraser.

Fraser and Wallace escaped.

== Location ==
The action took place in the vicinity of Stobo, near Peebles in the Scottish Borders. Current maps provide locations for Easter Happrew and Wester Happrew. However, the precise location of the skirmish is unknown and the coordinates given are approximate.
