= Montreuil, Vendée =

Montreuil
- Commune
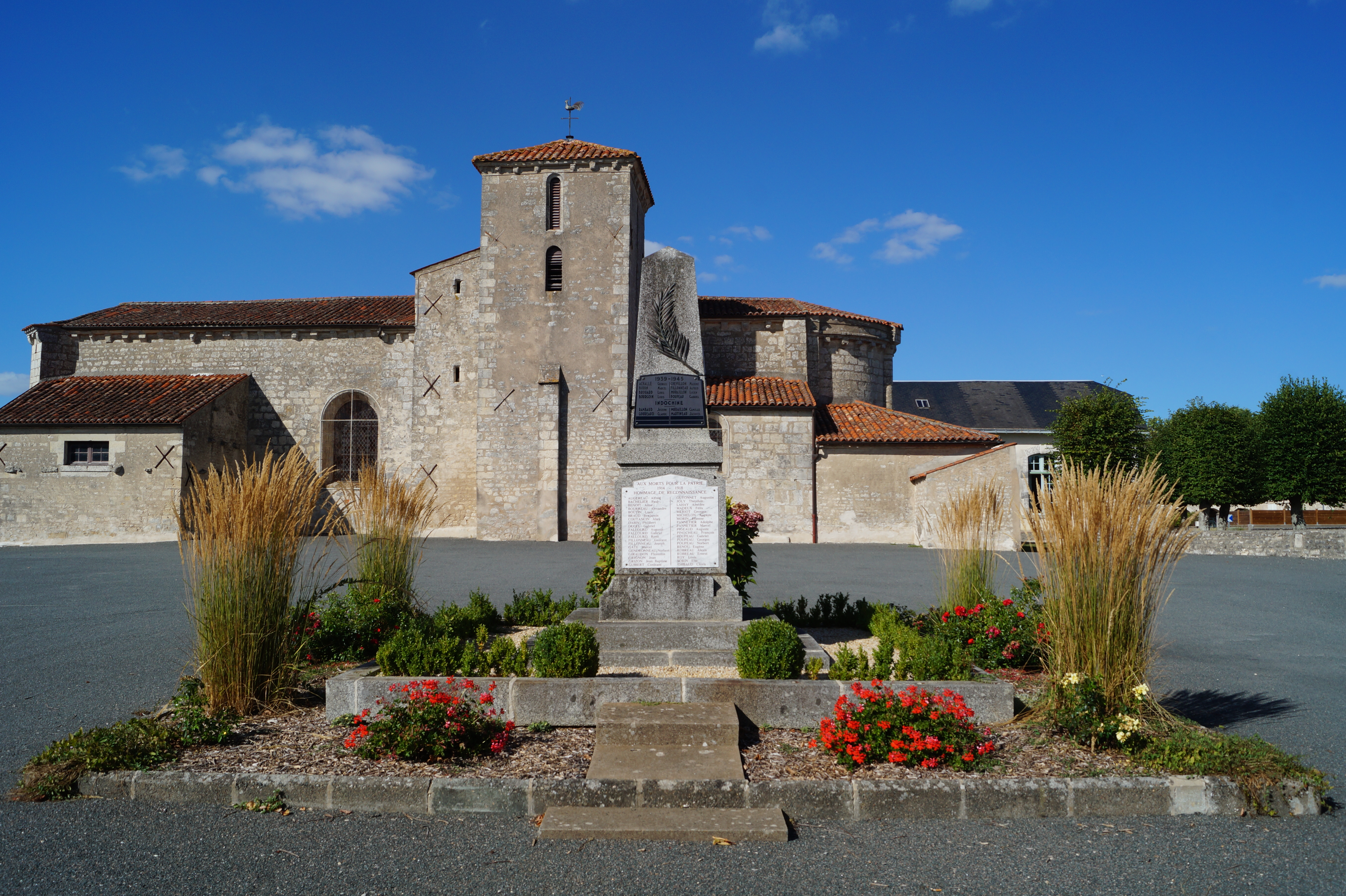

- Coat of arms
- Location of Montreuil
- Location within France Location within Pays de la Loire
- Coordinates: 46°24′32″N 0°50′11″W
- Country: France
- Region: Pays de la Loire
- Department: Vendée
- Arrondissement: Fontenay-le-Comte
- Canton: Fontenay-le-Comte
- Intercommunality: Pays de Fontenay-Vendée

Government
  - Mayor (2020–2026): Daniel Rideaud
- Area^{1}: 12.03 km^{2} (4.64 sq mi)
- Highest elevation: 23 m (75 ft)
- Lowest elevation: 1 m (3.3 ft)
- Population (2023): 818
  - Density: 68.0/km^{2} (176/sq mi)
- Time zone: UTC+01:00 (CET)
  - Summer (DST): UTC+02:00 (CEST)
- INSEE/Postal code: 85148 /85200
- ^{1} French Land Register data, which excludes lakes, ponds, glaciers > 1 km^{2} (0.386 sq mi or 247 acres) and river estuaries.

Montreuil (French pronunciation: [mɔ̃tʁœj]; Latin: Musterolium), distinguished as Montreuil-sur-Mer ("Montreuil-on-the-Sea") until 1945, is a commune in the Vendée Department in the Pays de la Loire region of western France.

== Geography ==
Montreuil lies in the south-west of the Vendée, on the boundary between the limestone plain and the Marais Poitevin marshland. The commune covers about 1,204 hectares (12 km^{2}), of which roughly two-thirds is plain and one-third is marsh and clay–marl soil. Its altitude ranges from 1 to 23 metres, with a mean of about 7 metres, and the settlement consists of the central bourg together with four large hamlets.

The commune is part of the arrondissement of Fontenay-le-Comte and lies within the functional area (aire d'attraction) of Fontenay-le-Comte. It has a temperate oceanic climate.

== History ==
Montreuil was the site of the 1299 Treaty of Montreuil, whereby the 1294–1303 Gascon War between King Edward I of England and Philip IV of France was paused at Pope Gregory VIII's urging and a betrothal was arranged between Edward's son Prince Edward of Caernarfon and Philip's daughter Princess Isabella.

The commune was known as Montreuil-sur-Mer until the mid-20th century. Its territory once lay on the shore of the former Gulf of Poitou, and part of it remained under the sea until around 1460. The "-sur-Mer" suffix was officially dropped in 1945, after the Second World War, to avoid confusion with Montreuil-sur-Mer in the Pas-de-Calais. The name Montreuil derives from the Latin monasteriolum, meaning "little monastery".

== Population ==
At the 2022 census the commune had 820 inhabitants, an increase of about 3% compared with 2016.

== Economy ==
Until the 1960s Montreuil was an essentially agricultural commune: cereals were grown on the plain, while the wet meadows of the marsh were used for raising cattle and horses and for dairy farming, and fishing was also significant. The mechanisation of agriculture later transformed local life, and by 2019 only 7 of the 72 businesses registered in the commune were engaged in farming. Montreuil has retained a 67-hectare communal pasture under collective grazing, maintained under an agreement with the Marais Poitevin regional natural park to preserve the wet meadows.

== Sights ==
The Church of Notre-Dame-de-l'Assomption has been listed as a monument historique since 1927. Built on a longitudinal plan with a semicircular apse, its choir is flanked by two chapels, and a square bell-tower without a spire stands against the south wall. The church dates from the 12th century and was remodelled in the 15th and 18th centuries.

== See also ==
- Communes of the Vendée department
