= Battle of Bonnegarde =

Major Battle of the Gascon War (1294–1303) between the French and English

- Part of the Gascon War
Date	2 February 1297
Location	Bonnegarde, Landes, south-west France
Result	French victory

Belligerents
France	England

Commanders and leaders
Robert II of Artois	Henry de Lacy

Strength
5,000–7,000	6,000–7,000

Casualties and losses
Light	700–1,400

The Battle of Bonnegarde, part of the Gascon War, took place in Bonnegarde in south-west France (in the present-day department of Landes) on 2 February 1297 and pitted a French army under Count Robert II of Artois against an English force commanded by Henry de Lacy, Earl of Lincoln, resulting in a French victory. This battle, in which the French ambushed and defeated the English army, was the only pitched battle of the war and largely ended the fighting in Guyenne in favor of France.

== Prelude ==
In the summer of 1296, the troops of Philip IV of France, led by Count Robert II of Artois, laid siege to Bonnegarde, a fortified town founded a few years earlier by the King of England and Duke of Aquitaine, Edward I. A year earlier, the fortified town of Saint-Sever had fallen to the French after a three-month siege, but was retaken by the English soon after, and Charles of Valois, the king's brother, had then been able to occupy a large part of the English duchy of Guyenne. Reinforcements were slow to arrive from England due to the revolt of the Scottish barons on the northern border of the country. As Bonnegarde, one of the last strongholds still in English hands, began to suffer famine, Edward I finally sent a reinforcement army, which marched from the port city of Bayonne on January 28, 1297, in an attempt to break the siege and bring in supplies. It was commanded by Henry de Lacy, third Earl of Lincoln, the king's lieutenant general in Aquitaine. On January 29, after passing the village of Bonnut, the English army found itself at the edge of a wood that had to be crossed to reach Bonnegarde. Faced with this obstacle, as a precaution Lincoln divided his troops into three columns. One was commanded by John of Brittany, Earl of Richmond, nephew of king Edward I, the other by Lincoln himself. The last, which constituted the vanguard, was entrusted to the command of John St John, Seneschal of the province of Aquitaine appointed by Edward I. In total, the English army numbered between 6,000 and 7,000 men, including approximately 800 knights and their squires.

Robert of Artois, meanwhile, had established his command at Orthez and, informed by spies of the English advance, had established garrisons at observation posts at Tilh and Estibeaux. When he learned of the splitting of the English army into three at the crossing of the forest between Bonnut and Bonnegarde, he arranged his own army in three divisions arranged in line on the other side of the wood. The first, which constituted his vanguard, was entrusted to the command of Thibaut de Cepoy while the second was led by Count Roger-Bernard III of Foix and the last commanded by the Count of Artois himself. His army consisted of a little less than six thousand men, including seven hundred knights and squires, the rest fighting on foot and comprising crossbowmen and lancers.

== The battle ==
Tired by the forced march from Bayonne and lacking in caution due to overly reassuring reports from their scouts, the English were surprised on February 2 (according to the English chronicler Nicholas Trivet) by the French army, which ambushed John St John's vanguard at the edge of the woods. Lacking time to adopt a fighting position, the vanguard was defeated, notably thanks to a charge by the Count of Foix, and John St John was taken prisoner alongside several other English knights. Realizing the rout, the Gascons recruited as foot soldiers by the English abandoned the field. While attempting to flee during the ongoing rout, John St John's vanguard troops collided with those of the two other English columns following them, also precipitating the escape of the Earl of Richmond. As for the commander-in-chief of the English army, Henry de Lacy, Earl of Lincoln, sources are contradictory as to his behavior: according to the Englishman Nicholas Trivet, he chose not to rescue his vanguard with his detachment in order to preserve part of his army, while according to French chroniclers, when most of his men had retreated, he regrouped what remained of his men and attempted a counterattack with 600 fighters against a reserve squadron composed of only 100 French soldiers, under the command of Robert of Artois — the rest of whose troops had gone in pursuit of the fleeing English. In any case, the Earl of Lincoln was defeated and also had to abandon the fight.

By nightfall, the entire English contingent was on the run. The pursuit lasted for two hours until the darkness prevented any action and dispersed the various troops. Most of the English managed to escape under cover of darkness, although in completely disarray. The Earl of Lincoln thus managed to reach the town of Peyrehorade, from where he then retreated to Bayonne. All of his army's baggage and the supplies planned for Saint-Sever were lost.

During the battle, which lasted approximately three hours, several English knights were killed, such as Philippe de Materedon, and many others were taken prisoner, including John St John, William Mortimer the Younger, and John de La Warde. Most of the prisoners were brought back to Paris by the Count of Artois. He was then sent by the King of France to command his army in Flanders, where he won the Battle of Furnes.

According to various sources (the Ancient Chronicles of Flanders and the Chronographia Regum Francorum), between 700 and 1,400 English soldiers were killed during the battle. French losses are unknown, but they were likely very low.

== Aftermath ==
After this defeat, the King of England sent no further forces to France and ceased his support for the County of Flanders in rebellion against the King of France, who began a war against Philip IV without foreign support. Edward I signed a truce with Philip IV on 9 October 1297, which was renewed several times before culminating six years later in the peace treaty that officially ended the Gascon War, which had effectively ceased after the Battle of Bonnegarde.

== Bibliography ==
- Louis Carolus-Barré, « Les deux testaments de Renaut, seigneur de Dargies, mort au camp devant Saint-Sever (1295) », Bulletin philologique et historique, 1969.
- Emmanuel Labat, "La bataille de Bonnegarde et la chapelle d'Arsague", Bulletin de la Société de Borda, 2018.
- Reginald Philip Lawton, Henry de Lacy, Earl of Lincoln (1272-1311), as locum tenens et capitaneus in the duchy of Aquitaine, London University, 1974.
- Inna Lubimenko, Jean de Bretagne, comte de Richmont, Université de Paris Lille, 1908.
- Valérie Toureille et al., Guerre et société : 1270-1480, Neuilly, Atlande, 2013, 511 p. (ISBN 978-2-35030-206-5).

=== Chronicles ===
- Nicholas Trivet, Annales sex regum Angliae, English Historical Society, 1845.
- La branche des Royaus Lingnages (Guillaume Guiart), in Recueil des historiens de Gaules et de la France - ed. Bouquet, Paris, 1738-1904, Vol. XXII.
- Anciennes chroniques de Flandre (anonyme) in Recueil des historiens des Gaules et de la France - ed. Bouquet, Paris,1738-1904, Vol. XXII.
- Les Grandes Chronique de France, ed. J. Viard, Paris, 1920-1953, Vol. VIII.
- Chronique de Guillaume Nangis, ed. H. Geraud, Paris, 1843.
- Chronographia Regum Francorum, ed. H. Moranvillé, Paris, Librairie Renouard, 1891, vol. I.

== See also ==
- Gascon War
- Gascon campaign (1294–1303)
