= Battle of Roslin =

Part of the First War of Scottish Independence (1303)

Coordinates: 55.855°N 3.164°W

- Part of the First War of Scottish Independence
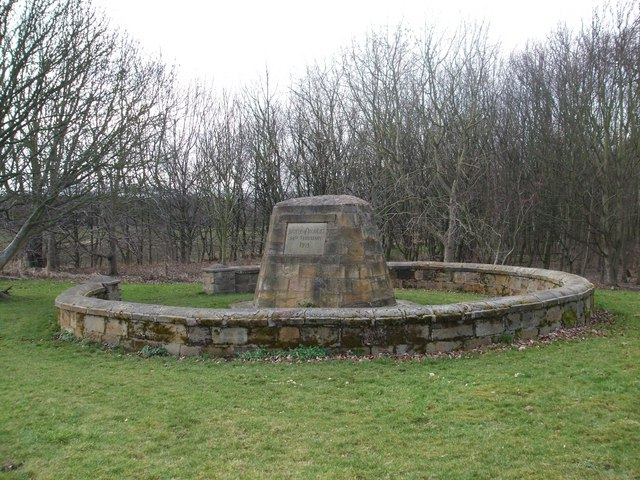
- Battle of Roslin memorial
Date	24 February 1303
Location	Roslin, Midlothian, Scotland
Result	Scottish victory

Belligerents
Kingdom of Scotland	Kingdom of England

Commanders and leaders
Lord John Comyn; Sir Simon Fraser	Lord John Segrave; Sir Ralph Manton †; Sir Robert Neville

Strength
8,000-10,000	Unknown

Casualties and losses
Unknown	Unknown

Registered battlefield
- Designated: 14 December 2012
- Reference no.: BTL37

The Battle of Roslin on 24 February 1303 was a Scottish victory in the First War of Scottish Independence. It took place near the village of Roslin, where a force led by the Scots John Comyn and Sir Simon Fraser ambushed and defeated an English reconnaissance party under Lord John Segrave.

== Background ==
An Anglo-Scottish truce expired on 30 November 1302, and the English prepared for a fresh invasion of Scotland, with John Segrave as the king's lieutenant in Scotland. King Edward I ordered Segrave to carry out a large-scale reconnaissance as far as Kirkintilloch, before the king himself fought a larger campaign. This force assembled at Wark on Tweed and moved north.

== Battle ==
The English advanced in three divisions, harassed by the Scots. At night, they camped in three divisions, several miles apart. The two commanders, John Comyn and Simon Fraser, led a Scots force on a night march, fell on the English, capturing Segrave and several others. Robert Neville led his division towards the action. The Scots eventually freed Segrave, but the English paymaster Manton was killed.

== Later legend ==
Scottish historian John of Fordun wrote a description of the fight:

...there never was so desperate a struggle, or one in which the stoutness of knightly prowess shone forth so brightly. The commander and leader in this struggle was John Comyn, the son... But John Comyn, then guardian of Scotland, and Simon Fraser with their followers, day and night, did their best to harass and to annoy, by their general prowess, the aforesaid kings officers and bailiffs... But the aforesaid John Comyn and Simon, with their abettors, hearing of their arrival, and wishing to steal a march rather than have one stolen upon them, came briskly through from Biggar to Rosslyn, in one night, with some chosen men, who chose rather death before unworthy subjection to the English nation; and all of a sudden they fearlessly fell upon the enemy.

— John of Fordun, Chronicle of the Scottish Nation

The battle was the subject of a fictional account written by Walter Bower in the mid-15th century. Like Fordun, Bower seriously exaggerated the size and importance of what was possibly more a victory over a large-scale raid rather than an invading army.

A monument cairn erected by the Roslin Heritage Society at the end of the 20th century marks the site of the battle. At the start of the 21st century, the battlefield was under research to be inventoried and protected by Historic Scotland under the Scottish Historical Environment Policy of 2009.
