= John Segrave, 2nd Baron Segrave =

English military commander (c. 1256–1325)

- Arms of Segrave
- Born: 20 July 1256; Seagrave, Leicestershire
- Died: 1 September 1325; Chacombe Priory, Northamptonshire
- Spouses: Maud de Swynnerton (1255–1275); Christian de Plessis (1257–1331)
- Issue: Stephen, 3rd Baron Segrave, Eleanor, John the younger
- Father: Nicholas de Segrave, 1st Baron Segrave
- Mother: Matilda de Lucy

John Segrave, 2nd Baron Segrave (c. 1256 – 1325) was an English commander in the First War of Scottish Independence.

Segrave commanded the English in the battles of Roslin and Happrew. He also was involved with the execution of William Wallace, and was the one who carried his quarters to their destinations in Scotland. He died a wealthy man.

== Early life ==
Born 20 July, about 1256 (aged 39 in 1295), he was the son and heir of Nicholas de Segrave, 1st Baron Segrave, and his wife Maud, daughter of Geoffrey de Lucy, Knt., of Newington, Kent, Cublington, Buckinghamshire, Dallington and Slapton, Northamptonshire, etc., by his wife, Nichole. In 1270 John married Christian, daughter of Sir Hugh de Plescy (son of John du Plessis, 7th Earl of Warwick), Knt., of Hook Norton, Headington, and Kidlington, Oxfordshire, Stottesden, Shropshire, Kidderminster, Worcestershire, etc., by his 1st wife, Isabel, daughter and co-heiress of John Biset. Christian's maritagium included the manor of Stottesdon, Shropshire. At the same time, his sister Amabel married Hugh's son, John de Plescy. After his father-in-law's death, John de Segrave had custody of his lands during the minority of his heir.

== Under Edward I ==
In 1277 and 1282 Segrave served in the two major campaigns against Llywelyn ap Gruffudd, Prince of Wales. In October 1287 he went to Ireland, nominating proctors to represent him for one year. On 6 August 1291 he received at Berwick letters of protection for one year on staying in Scotland on the king's service. He was then for a time constantly employed in the wars against the Scots.

On the death of his father in 1295 Segrave, then 39, entered as heir into the possession of his property. He was first summoned to the Bury parliament of November 1296, and was then regularly summoned until his death. On 14 January 1297 Segrave was one of the magnates attending the Hilarytide parliament at York, with the intention of proceeding against the Scots, but the expedition was postponed.

=== Opposition leader and Scottish campaigns ===
Segrave attached himself to one of the leaders of the growing baronial opposition to the king, in 1297 making an indenture with Roger Bigod, 5th Earl of Norfolk, by which he covenanted to serve the earl, with five other knights. In return he obtained a grant of the earl's manor of Lodene in Norfolk.

During the crisis of 1297 Segrave was summoned on 1 July to appear in London to attend the king beyond sea, but he appeared as proxy for the Earl Marshal Bigod, who pleaded sickness.

Segrave, however, on 28 December 1297 received letters of protection for himself and his followers, on their proceeding to Scotland on the king's service, and he subsequently fought in the Falkirk campaign. In 1299 he was again summoned to fight against the Scots. In 1300 he was once more in Scotland, taking a conspicuous part at the siege of Caerlaverock, representing Bigod in this campaign also. In 1301 Segrave attended the parliament at Lincoln and was one of the signatories of the letter of the barons to the pope, dated 12 February. On 5 August 1302 he was appointed to the custody of Berwick Castle of Berwick-on-Tweed. On 29 September he was ordered to make a foray into Scotland as far as Stirling and Kirkintilloch. After November the truce with the Scots ended, and Segrave was entrusted with the custody of Scotland.

On the first Sunday in Lent 1303 Segrave, with his followers dispersed, was suddenly attacked when near Edinburgh by some Scots in ambush, severely wounded, and taken prisoner with twenty other knights. He was, however, subsequently recaptured by the other portions of his army who had escaped the earlier surprise. Segrave continued in Scotland after Edward I arrived to prosecute the war in person. He was present at the siege of Stirling Castle, which surrendered on 24 July 1304, and, on the departure of Edward, was appointed justice and captain in Scotland south of the River Forth.

Serious resistance to Edward now seemed over, and Segrave's main business was to administer the conquered districts and to track down William Wallace, who still held out. In March 1304 Segrave defeated Wallace in one of his last attempts at resistance. Next summer Wallace was handed over to Segrave, by John de Menteith, and would personally escort his prisoner to London, reaching the city on 22 August 1305. Before this Edward had on 18 August put Segrave at the head of the special commission appointed to try Wallace. He remained responsible for Wallace's custody during his imprisonment in London, and on 23 August pronounced the sentence of treason against him. After Wallace's death, Segrave took his quartered remains back to Scotland to be displayed at Newcastle, Berwick, Stirling and Perth. On 25 October 1305, he received his salary, this perhaps being the date of his ceasing to act as warden of Scotland. In 1306 he was again summoned to Carlisle to share in Edward I's invasion of Scotland.

== Under Edward II ==
Under Edward II Segrave received numerous offices. In the early months of the new reign he became justice of the forests beyond the River Trent, and constable of Nottingham Castle. On 10 March 1309 he was appointed warden of Scotland, with a following of sixty men at arms, and on 10 April 1310 the appointment was renewed. Scotland was now rapidly falling into the hands of Robert Bruce, Segrave's work was mostly preserve the English frontier: he is, in fact, described by a border chronicler as warden of the marches on the side of Berwick. But a continued truce from November 1309 to the summer of 1310 restricted Segrave's efforts.

Segrave adhered to the barons during the struggle against Piers Gaveston, and as a result his offices of constable of Nottingham and justice of the forests beyond Trent were on 1 October 1310 transferred by the king to Gaveston himself. Both grants were renewed to Gaveston two months before his execution. On 4 September 1312, soon after Gaveston's death, Segrave received the office of keeper of the forests on this side Trent. In 1314 he took part in the great expedition against Scotland, and on 24 June fought at the battle of Bannockburn. After the English defeat he fled towards Carlisle, and took refuge with others in Bothwell Castle; but the sheriff, who held the castle, changed sides, and handed over the fugitives as prisoners.

Segrave was kept in Scotland until the end of 1314, when he was released in exchange for some Scottish prisoners and on payment of a large ransom; his son Stephen arranged the conditions of the exchange. He still held his keepership and the custody of Nottingham Castle, to which Derby Castle was now added. On 14 July 1316 he received a grant of £1,000 in aid of his ransom from the Scots and for other losses in the king's service, sums due to the crown being deducted from the gross sum. He was one of the continual council, appointed at the reconciliation between Edward II and Thomas, 2nd Earl of Lancaster in 1318, to be perpetually about the king. On 30 November 1321 he was one of those ordered to raise the local levies on the king's behalf in Warwickshire, Leicestershire and Staffordshire.

== Death ==
On 16 July 1324 Segrave was appointed Seneschal of Gascony and with Fulk FitzWarin, was captain of the troops going to Gascony, serving under Edmund of Woodstock, Earl of Kent. The next year he died in Aquitaine, aged nearly 70 years old. The extent of the Segrave territories and influence had been much widened during his lifetime. His father's estates were nearly confined to the central midland counties, but he also acquired territory in Norfolk, Oxfordshire, Huntingdonshire and other shires. In 1301 he had licence to crenellate his house at Bretby, Derbyshire, and in 1306 to fortify his manor-house at Caludon, Warwickshire, with a moat and embattelled wall.

== Family ==
Segrave's eldest son, Sir Stephen de Segrave, died shortly after him in 1325. His second son, John, described by 1312 as John de Segrave the younger, married Juliana, daughter and heiress of John de Sandwich, lord of Folkestone, and died in 1349, leaving an infant daughter and heiress named Mary.

John Segrave, 4th Baron Segrave, son of Stephen, succeeded to the title and estates. He served in Edward III's French wars, and married Margaret, daughter and heiress of Thomas of Brotherton, Earl of Norfolk. This John was the last of the Segraves summoned to parliament.

== Coat of arms ==
His coat of arms—sable a lion rampant argent crowned or (inherited from his father)—appears on the following rolls of arms which verify his presence on the Scottish campaigns mentioned above: The Falkirk Roll (together with his brother Nicholas, who bore the same arms differenced by: overall a label of three pendants gules); The Caerlaverock Poem (again with Nicholas); and The Stirling Roll (with brothers Henry, Nicholas and Simon, and son Stephen). Of course, his brothers and son all have differenced arms.

== Notes ==
Attribution

This article incorporates text from a publication now in the public domain: Lee, Sidney, ed. (1897). "Segrave, John de". Dictionary of National Biography. Vol. 51. London: Smith, Elder & Co.

Peerage of England
Preceded by Nicholas Segrave	Baron Segrave; 1295–1325	Succeeded by Stephen Segrave
