= Lieutenant of the Duchy of Aquitaine =

The Lieutenant of the Duchy of Aquitaine was an officer charged with governing the Duchy of Aquitaine on behalf of the King of England. Unlike the seneschalcy of Gascony, the lieutenancy was not a permanent office. Lieutenants were appointed in times of emergency, due either to an external threat or internal unrest. The lieutenant had quasi-viceregal authority and so was usually a man of high rank, usually English and often of the royal family.

Aquitaine, a grand fief in southwestern France, was a possession of the English crown from 1154, when the Duke of Aquitaine and Gascony inherited the English throne, until it was finally conquered by the French at the end of the Hundred Years' War (1453).

== List of lieutenants ==
- 1248–1254 Simon de Montfort
- 1269–1270 Roger of Leybourne
- 1272 Thomas de Clare
- 1278 Otton de Grandson jointly with Robert Burnel
- 1287–1288 William of Middleton, also seneschal
- 1289 Maurice VI de Craon
- 1293–1294 John de Saint-John
- 1294; 1310–1311 John of Brittany
- 1295–1296 Edmund of Lancaster, who died in 1296
- 1296–1297 Henry de Lacy, acting lieutenant from 1295
- 1298–1299 Gui Ferre
- 1299–1302 Barrau de Sescas jointly with Pey-Arnaut de Vic
- 1302–1304; 1309–11 John Hastings, also seneschal
- 1312 John de Ferrers, also seneschal
- 1312–1313 Estèbe Ferréol, also seneschal
- 1324–1325 Edmund of Woodstock
- 1338–1341 Bernard Ezi II d'Albret jointly with (1) Oliver Ingham (also seneschal) and then (2) Hugues de Genève
- 1344 Richard FitzAlan jointly with Henry of Grosmont
- 1345–1347; 1349 Henry of Grosmont, alone
- 1352–1355 Ralph Stafford
- 1355–1357 Edward the Black Prince, later Prince of Aquitaine (1362–72)
- 1360–1362 John Chandos
- 1370–1371 John of Gaunt, later Duke of Aquitaine (1390–1399)
- 1372 John Hastings
- 1378–1381 John Neville
- 1388–1389 John of Gaunt
- 1394–1398 Henry "Hotspur" Percy
- 1398 John Beaufort
- 1401–1403 Edward of Norwich
- 1412–1413 Thomas of Lancaster
- 1413 Thomas Beaufort
- 1439–1440 John Holland
- 1443 John Beaufort, did not act
- 1452–1453 John Talbot
- 1453 William Bonville
