= Bonnegarde =

- Commune
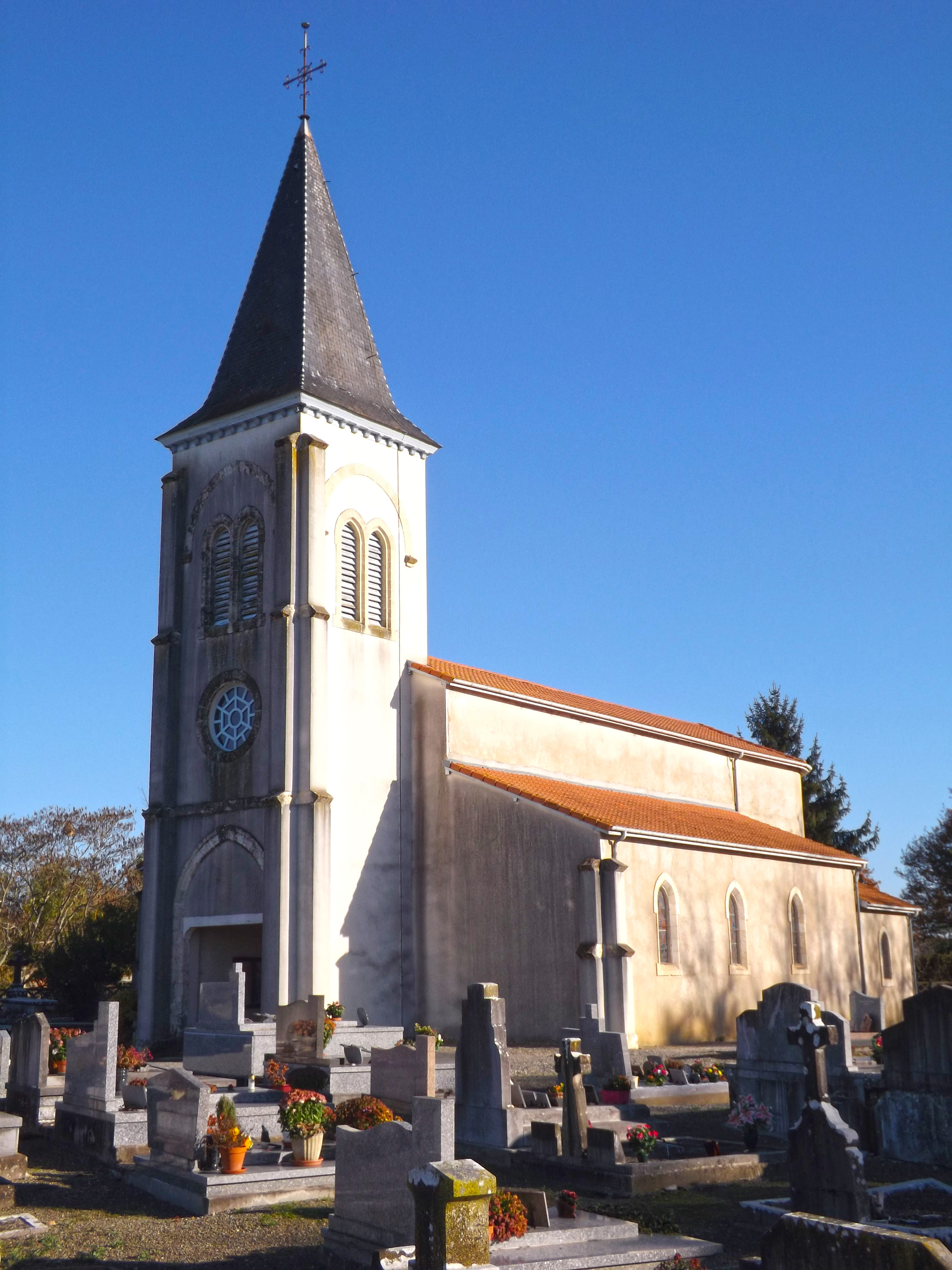
- Location of Bonnegarde
- Location within France Location within Nouvelle-Aquitaine
- Coordinates: 43°34′08″N 0°42′08″W
- Country: France
- Region: Nouvelle-Aquitaine
- Department: Landes
- Arrondissement: Dax
- Canton: Coteau de Chalosse

Government
  - Mayor (2020–2026): Didier Larrouture
- Area^{1}: 9.67 km^{2} (3.73 sq mi)
- Elevation: 170 m (560 ft)
- Highest elevation: 131 m (430 ft)
- Lowest elevation: 49 m (161 ft)
- Population (2023): 254
  - Density: 26.3/km^{2} (68.0/sq mi)
- Time zone: UTC+01:00 (CET)
  - Summer (DST): UTC+02:00 (CEST)
- INSEE/Postal code: 40047 /40330
- ^{1} French Land Register data, which excludes lakes, ponds, glaciers > 1 km^{2} (0.386 sq mi or 247 acres) and river estuaries.

Bonnegarde (French pronunciation: [bɔnɡaʁd]; Gascon: Bonaguarda) is a commune in the Landes department in Nouvelle-Aquitaine in southwestern France.

An ancient fort stands in the village dating back to 1283 and Edward I of England, founder of the bastide. In 1297, a French army under Robert II, Count of Artois defeated an English army under Henry de Lacy during the Battle of Bonnegarde, part of the Gascon War.

== Population ==
Historical population
Year	Pop.	±% p.a.
1968	322	—
1975	302	−0.91%
1982	261	−2.06%
1990	274	+0.61%
1999	275	+0.04%
2007	265	−0.46%
2012	306	+2.92%
2017	274	−2.18%
2023	254	−1.26%
Source: INSEE

== See also ==
- Communes of the Landes department
