= Simon Fraser (died 1306) =

Scottish knight

Sir Simon Fraser
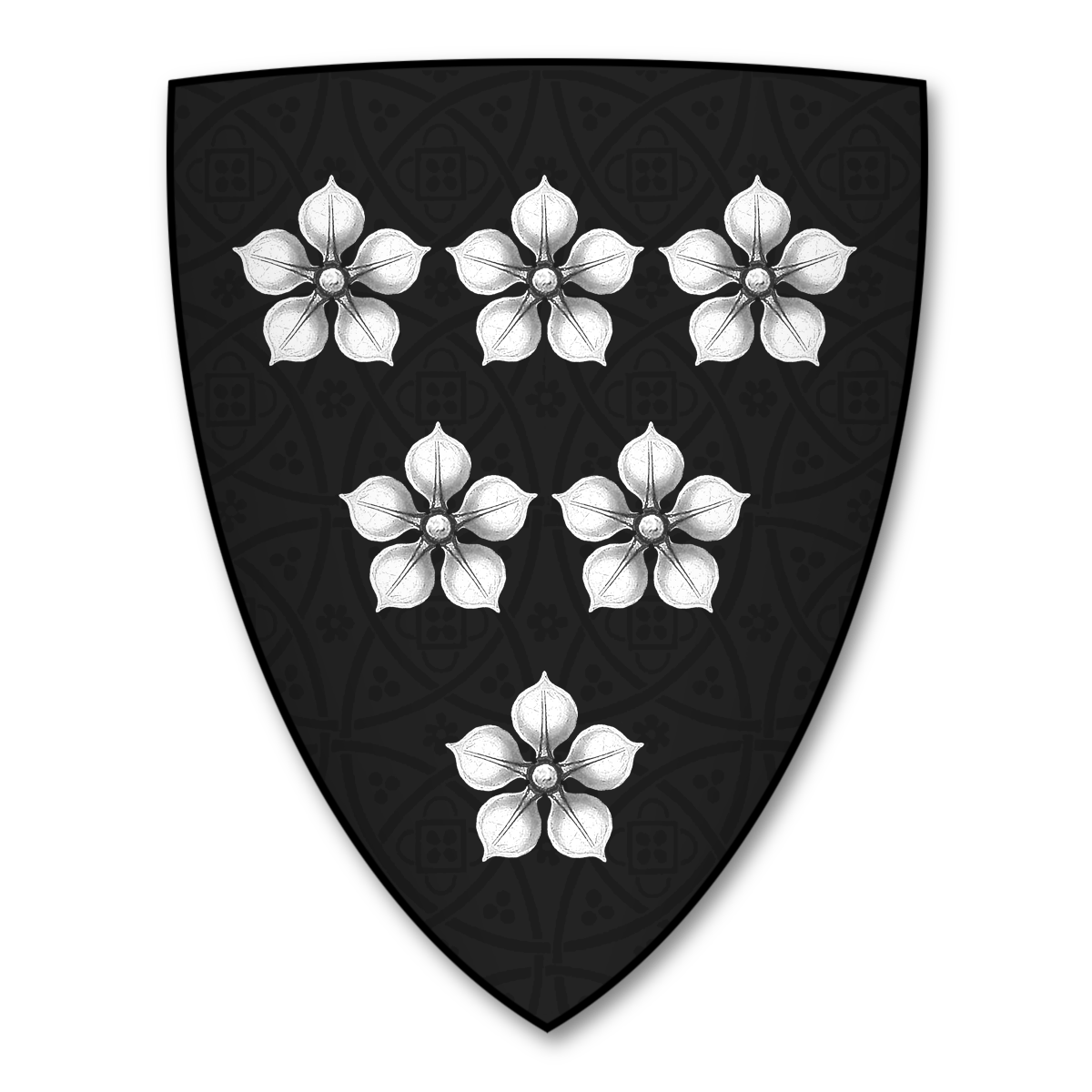
- Arms of Simon Fraser. Sable, six cinquefoils argent, three, two, one.
- Died: 8 September 1306; London, England
- Military career
- Conflicts: Battle of Dunbar (1296); Flanders (1297–98); Siege of Caerlaverock (1300); Battle of Roslin (1303); Battle of Happrew (1304); Battle of Methven (1306)

Sir Simon Fraser of Oliver and Neidpath was a Scottish knight who fought in the Wars of Scottish Independence, for which he was hanged, drawn, and quartered in 1306.

== Life ==
Simon Fraser was the son of Simon Fraser, Sheriff of Peebles and Keeper of the forests of Selkirk and Traquair (died 1291), and his wife Maria.

Perhaps because he was slow in submitting to Edward I of England - he only did so on 23 July 1291 - the younger Simon Fraser did not succeed his father in his offices. Instead, Edward confided the Forest of Selkirk to William Comyn of Kirkintilloch.

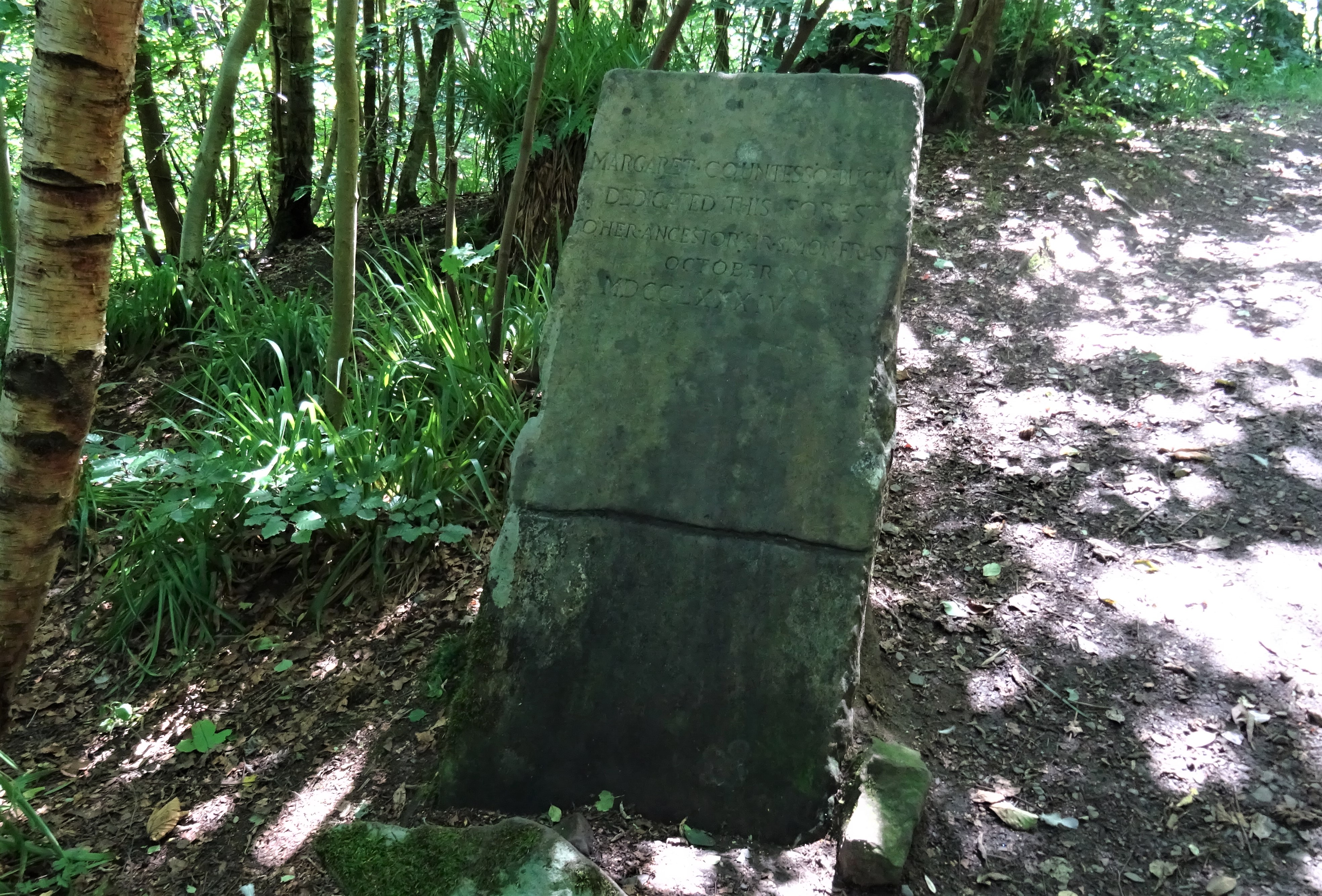
Memorial stone to Sir Simon Fraser at Almondell and Calderwood Park, West Lothian.

When Edward's intention to usurp the Scottish throne became evident, Fraser joined the Scottish party. He was captured during the Battle of Dunbar on 27 April 1296 and was sent to a prison in England. He was forfeited of his lands. He was released to serve King Edward I of England's expedition in Flanders in 1297. Fraser was made a household knight – effectively, a member of the royal bodyguard – and gifted a horse by Edward before the Battle of Falkirk. Fraser was thus among the English cavalry divisions that defeated the army of William Wallace. On 27 March 1299, in recognition of his good service, he was restored his lands and titles. He was the Keeper of Selkirk Forest, and was at the Siege of Caerlaverock on the side of the English in 1300.

He switched back to the Scottish side in mid-1301 and led the Scottish victory at the Battle of Roslin in 1303, alongside John III Comyn, Lord of Badenoch (also known as "Red Comyn"). Here Fraser killed Ralph Manton, an English treasury clerk, whom Fraser accused of embezzling King Edward of funds and neglecting to pay Fraser's wages when he was in English service. Consequently, the English King Edward I, marched north through Stirling taking Perth. As Edward approached Dunfermline, the Bishop of St Andrews and the bishop of Glasgow along with Red Comyn met his army and submitted. Fraser refused to swear fealty to the English King and did not attend.

In March 1304, Fraser and Wallace were ambushed by English forces at the action at Happrew and defeated. By June Fraser had deserted Wallace and accepted Edward's peace terms. In January 1305 he was employed, along with all other Scottish knights, to hunt down his former comrade Wallace.

In March 1306 Fraser once again broke faith with King Edward and defected to Robert the Bruce. He escaped from the defeat at the Battle of Methven, but was captured during the summer of 1306 at a subsequent engagement at Kirkencliff near Stirling by Sir Thomas de Multon and Sir John Jose. King Edward had commanded all captured supporters of King Robert executed and, in particular, the lands of Simon Fraser harried and burnt. The prisoner was sent to London, and hanged, drawn, and quartered in September 1306. His head was impaled on a spike on London Bridge, along with Wallace's.

== Family ==
Simon is known to have had the following issue:

- Margaret Fraser, married Sir Gilbert Haya of Lochorwart, passing the Barony of Neidpath into the Hay family; had issue.
- Joan Fraser, married Sir Patrick Fleming of Biggar, passing the Barony of Oliver into the Fleming family; had issue.
