= John St John (died 1302) =

English soldier and diplomat

Sir John St John
- Arms of John St John: Argent, on a chief gules two mullets or
- Born: 1230s
- Died: 6 September 1302; Lochmaben, Dumfriesshire, Scotland
- Buried: Old Basing, Hampshire, England
- Spouse: Alice FitzPiers
- Issue: John St John, 1st Baron St John; Edward St John; Agnes St John
- Father: Robert St John
- Mother: Agnes Cantilupe

Sir John St John (died 1302), of Basing in Hampshire, was an English landowner, soldier, administrator and diplomat who was a close confidant of King Edward I, serving him in many capacities.

== Origins ==
Born in the 1230s, he was the son of Robert St John (died 1267) and his wife, believed to be Agnes Cantilupe, daughter of William Cantilupe (died 1251) and his wife Millicent Gournay. His paternal grandparents were William de Port (died 1239), who changed his last name to St John, and his wife Mabel.

== Career ==
On the death of his father in 1267, he inherited extensive lands in Berkshire, Hampshire, where he was constable of Porchester Castle, Herefordshire, Kent, Sussex, where he held the significant lordship of Halnaker, and Warwickshire. Having been loyal to King Henry III throughout the civil wars, in 1269 he and his household were granted a pardon for any offences during the disturbances. After the king's death in 1272, he was a member of the council that sent the news to the successor King Edward I, then on crusade in Palestine.

In 1276 he was one of the magnates present at the council at which judgment was given against Llywelyn ap Gruffudd, and he participated in Edward's invasions of Wales in 1277 and 1282. In 1283 he attended the assembly at Shrewsbury which tried Dafydd ap Gruffydd.

During Edward's travels in France and Aquitaine between 1286 and 1289, St John was involved in negotiations between King Alfonso III of Aragon and King Charles II of Naples and he (or possibly his son John) was one of the hostages handed over to Alfonso in 1288 to secure the release of Charles, Prince of Salerno. He returned to England in early 1289 and attended Parliament in May 1290. Between 1290 and 1292 he was on further diplomatic missions, one to Tarascon continuing Edward's mediation between the kingdoms of Naples and Aragon and one to Pope Nicholas IV in Rome, dealing first with a proposed crusade and secondly with Edward's arbitration over claimants to the throne of Scotland. At the enthronement in December 1292 of Edward's nominee, John Balliol, he acted as deputy for the infant Earl of Fife.

In 1293, with relations between Edward and King Philip IV of France becoming strained, he was sent to Aquitaine as the king's Lieutenant of the Duchy of Aquitaine, urgently strengthening and provisioning fortified places and organising garrisons for them. In negotiations in Paris, the king's younger brother Edmund, Earl of Lancaster, had agreed that the French could occupy certain strongholds. News of this had not reached St John when French envoys arrived and, after first refusing to see them, he then sent away empty-handed. Only on receiving firm instructions from Lancaster did he reluctantly sell off the stores he had amassed and, after handing over the designated places, return to England.

In 1294, open war broke out between England and France and an English expedition was mounted to recapture the strongholds of Aquitaine, with St John appointed Seneschal of the duchy. Sailing up the Gironde, the fleet took Macau, Bourg and Blaye but found Bordeaux too well defended. Carrying on up the Garonne, they captured Rions, from where St John left with a force to attack Bayonne. On 1 January 1295 he took the town, expelled the French garrison, and arrested the pro-French members of the town council, who were sent to England as prisoners.

French counter-attacks during 1295 and 1296 under Charles of Valois and Robert II of Artois regained much of the duchy apart from the south-west corner and the war subsided into desultory sieges and raids. On 5 January 1297, St John and the new commander of the English forces, Henry Lacy, Earl of Lincoln were escorting a convoy with supplies for the besieged town of Bonnegarde when they were ambushed by the French during the battle of Bonnegarde.

St John, who commanded the English vanguard, was captured with ten to forty other knights and taken as a prisoner to Paris, where his ransom was set at 5,000 pounds, an enormous figure (equivalent to about 4.67 million pounds in 2022) that he could not possibly meet from his own resources. His son John, who had been serving under his father in Aquitaine, raised money there and the monks of Westminster Abbey voted a sum to help but the balance had to be borrowed from Italian banking concerns such as the Frescobaldi and the Buonsignori, against which he had to pledge them four of his manors.

Freed in 1299, he was immediately summoned to a council of war at Rochester to plan the invasion of Flanders, but from then on his career was largely spent in promoting the English interest in Scotland. In January 1300 he was appointed the king's lieutenant in Annandale, Cumberland, Lancashire, Westmorland, and the marches as far as Roxburghshire. During the siege of Caerlaverock in 1300, he and his son John were entrusted with the care of Prince Edward, Edward I's son, who was taking part in his first campaign.

As a senior knight banneret of the king's household, with a large retinue to support, he regularly received wages and gifts, together with compensation for horses lost or killed on duty. His son John was awarded 40 pounds (say 34,000 pounds in 2022) for the loss of a particularly valuable black war-horse. The burden of lost capital and of interest on loans to meet his ransom from French captivity was to some extent offset by grants of land and offices in Scotland and the marches but these were often in war-torn areas, difficult to control. In September 1300, he was granted 667 pounds a year (say 562,000 pounds in 2022) for life from English lands and a life income from tenure of the castles of Cockermouth and Skipton. As well as being warden of Galloway and sheriff of Dumfriesshire, he was appointed captain of Lochmaben Castle.

In January 1301 he was at the Parliament held at Lincoln and in February, as lord of Halnaker, sealed the Barons' Letter of 1301 to the Pope. His seal displayed personal arms blazoned as Argent, on a chief gules two mullets of six points voided. In March he was one of the English envoys negotiating at Canterbury for an Anglo-French peace and an Anglo-Scots truce. After being with the king at Westminster in July 1302, he returned to his border command and died on 6 September 1302 at Lochmaben. His body was buried in St Mary's Church at Old Basing in Hampshire. His arms were blazoned Argent, on a chief gules two mullets or, with a crest of a lion passant between two palm branches.

== Family ==
Before 29 January 1256, he married Alice FitzPiers, daughter of Reginald FitzPiers, and their children included:

- John St John, 1st Baron St John (died 1329), who married Isabel Courtenay.
- Edward St John (died 1347), a godson of King Edward I, who married Eve Dawtrey (died 1354).
- Agnes St John (died 1345), who married Hugh Courtenay, Earl of Devon.
