= Chipotenses =

Currency in medieval south-west France

The chipotenses, sometimes the libra chipotensis, capotois or the pound chipot was a currency in medieval south-west France.

The origin of the currency's names is unknown as is the location where it was minted. Towards the end of the 13th century it was sometimes the currency of Gascony and also Bigorre and Agenais. Edward I of England sent his moneyer William de Turnemire to Gascony in 1285 to take control of the mint there and introduce new currency. In 1289–1290 the mayor of Bordeaux ordered that the new English money should be the unit of measure in the city and that the chipotense would no longer be accepted for trade but could be exchanged for new currency. There afterwards followed a rapid decline in the value of the chipotense from around 0.183 English pounds to 0.125 pounds by 1312.
