= Treaty of Montreuil (1299) =

1299 treaty between England and France

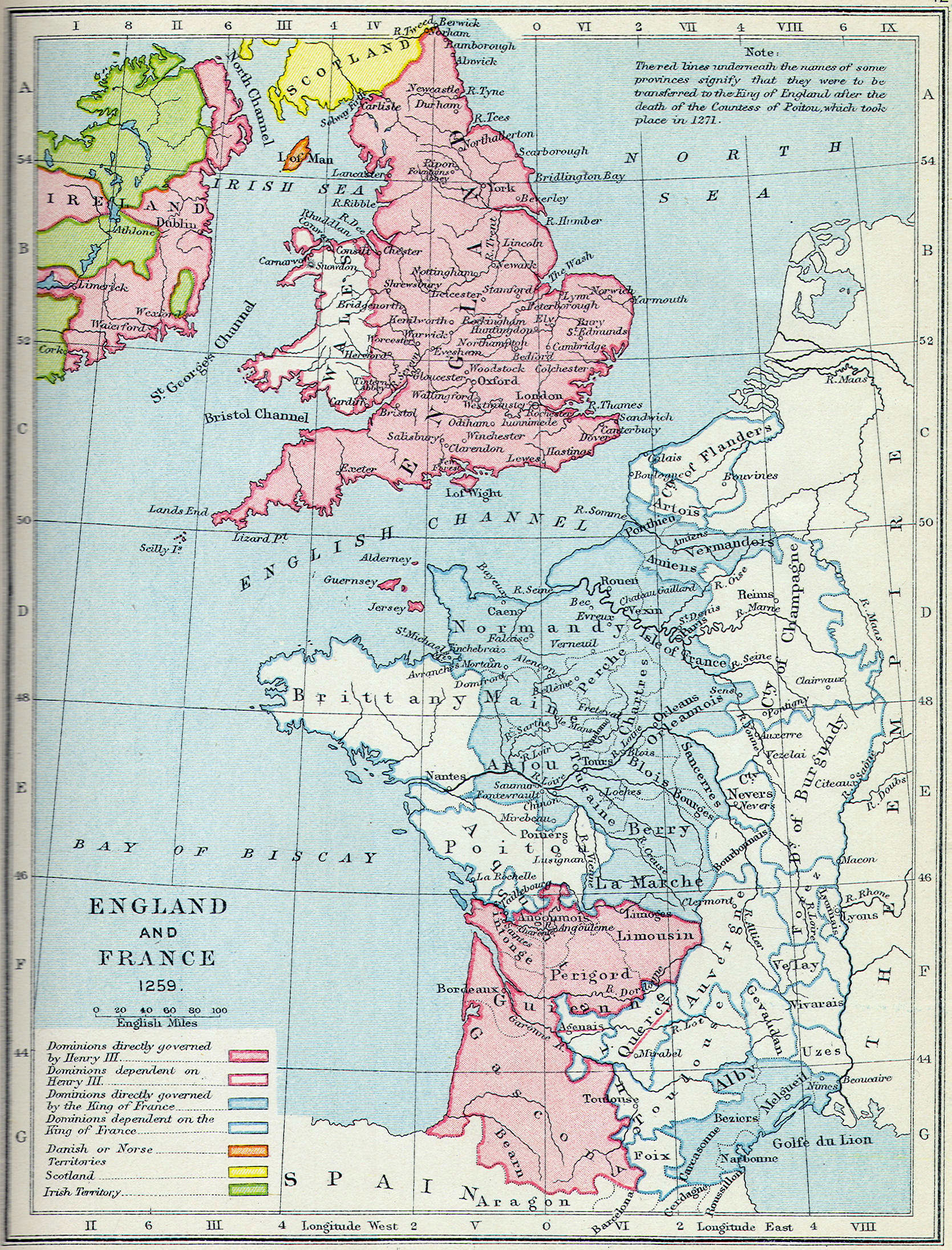
The English Angevin Empire and France after the 1259 Treaty of Paris and 1271 deaths of the Count and Countess of Poitou.

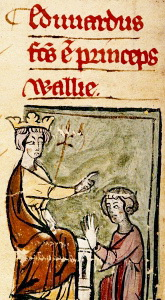
Edward I creating Edward II Prince of Wales (early 14th cent.)

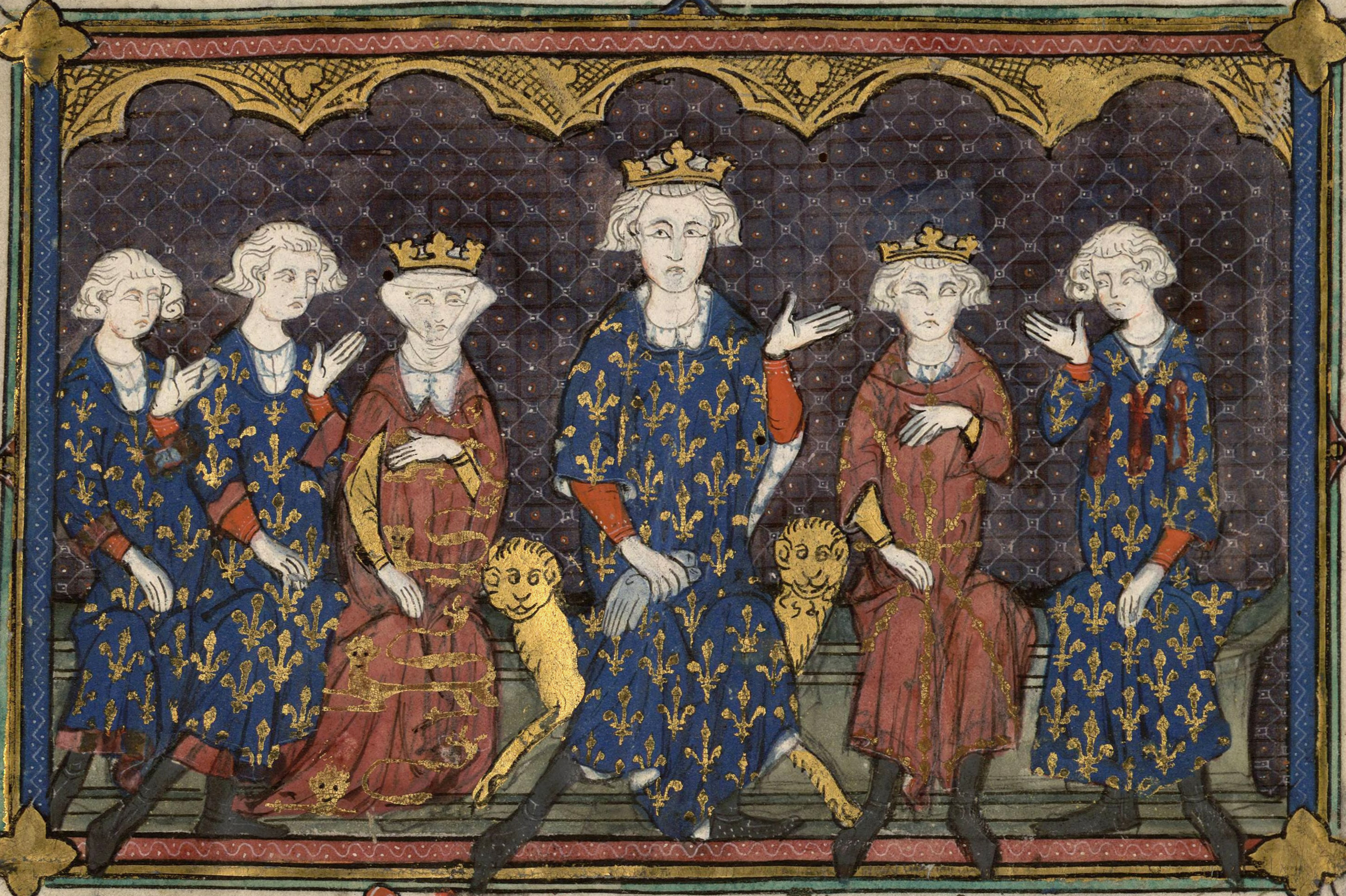
Philip IV and family—Isabella 3rd from left—in a 1313 manuscript illumination

The 1299 Treaty of Montreuil (Latin: Tractatus apud Musterolium) or Montreuil-sur-Mer (Note: This historic name of Montreuil should not cause it to be confused with Montreuil in Pas-de-Calais, which has been formally known as Montreuil-sur-Mer since 2023.) (French: Traité de Montreuil-sur-Mer) was part of the negotiations between King Edward I of England and Philip IV of France during the 1294–1303 Gascon War. It provided for the betrothal of Edward's son Prince Edward of Caernarfon and Philip's daughter Isabella ("the She-Wolf of France"). It was drafted at Montreuil on 19 June 1299 and ratified by Edward I on 4 July and Philip IV on the Feast of the Invention of St Stephen (3 August).

The treaty was negotiated on Edward I's behalf by Henry de Lacy, the earl of Lincoln; Guy de Beauchamp, the earl of Warwick; and Amadeus V, count of Savoy. Under its terms, should Edward I default on the treaties, he would forfeit Gascony; if Philip defaulted, he would pay a fine of £100,000. It was said by contemporaries that the alliance brought "great unhappiness to both parties". Edward I also privately instructed the count to enquire about Philip's half-sister Margaret of France, whom Edward married at Canterbury soon afterwards on 10 September.

Upon France's ratification of the original treaty, it was supplemented by the Treaty of Chartres on the same day. The final betrothal of Prince Edward, by then Prince of Wales, and Isabella formed part of the 1303 Treaty of Paris that finally concluded the war. Following the prince's accession as Edward II in 1307, the two married at Boulogne-sur-Mer on 25 January 1308, when Isabella was 12.
