= English expedition to Flanders (1297–1298) =

English military campaign

- Part of Gascon War & Franco-Flemish War
Date	August 1297–March 1298
Location	County of Flanders
Result	Armistice pausing direct conflict between England and France until 1303 Treaty of Paris ended French occupation of Aquitaine and restored status quo in exchange for English neutrality in the continuing Franco-Flemish War

Belligerents
Kingdom of England; County of Flanders	Kingdom of France

Commanders and leaders
Edward I of England; Guy, Count of Flanders	Philip IV of France; Robert II of Artois; Rainier Grimaldi

Strength
822 knights and 7560 infantry and bowman	unknown

The English expedition to Flanders (1297–1298) was an English expedition to Flanders that lasted from August 1297 until March 1298. King Edward I of England in an alliance with Guy, Count of Flanders, as part of the wider 1294–1303 Gascon War, led an English force to Flanders, hoping to form military alliances and support to lead a combined force against King Philip IV of France. The expedition was difficult and expensive for Edward, but enough of his allies went into action to gain a truce from the French. After a peace was reached with King Philip IV of France, Edward left Flanders in March 1298.

== Background ==
In 1294, Guy, Count of Flanders turned for help to King Edward I of England, arranging a marriage between his daughter Philippa and Edward, Prince of Wales. However, King Philip IV of France imprisoned Guy and two of his sons, forcing Guy to call off the marriage, and imprisoned Philippa in Paris. Philippa remained imprisoned until her death in 1306.

The Count of Flanders was summoned before King Phillip again in 1296, and the principal cities of Flanders were taken under royal protection, until Guy paid an indemnity and surrendered his territories, to hold them at the grace of the King. After these indignities, Guy attempted to seek revenge on Philip by an alliance with King Edward I of England in 1297, which was at war with France. Philip responded by declaring Flanders annexed to the royal domain and sent a French army under Robert II of Artois to conquer Flanders.

Guy's eldest son Robert of Bethune occupied Mortagne, at the confluence of the Scheldt and the Scarpe rivers, and the castle of Helkijn. In March 1297, King Philip arrested all partisans of the Count of Flanders and seized all their property. Philip then occupied the castle of L'Ecluse near Douai. In June 1297 Philip gathered an army of about 3,000 knights at Compiègne. The French army marched on Arras (6 June), Lens (12 June) and reached the Franco-Flemish border near Douai on 14 June 1297. The next day part of the French cavalry, led by the King's brother Charles of Valois and by Raoul de Nesle crossed the border near Râches and encountered part of the Flemish army, consisting of German mercenaries, which was defeated. After this setback Orchies surrendered to France. Valois' troops, raided and burned the countryside up to Lille, but then returned to the French main army.

== Opposition ==
Edward I tried various ways to maintain the campaign in France, including pressing the nobility into military service and seizing England's wool exports. It was the opinion of many that this war was unnecessary and risky, in a time when the situation in both Wales and Scotland was threatening. Many nobles refused to serve in the Flanders campaign, claiming it was unclear where the expedition was going.

== August 1297 ==
In August 1297 the French troops were reinforced when Robert of Artois returned from his successful campaign against Edward in Aquitaine. Artois' troops marched upon Cassel, which, except for the Flemish occupied castle, was burned, and to Sint-Winoksbergen, which surrendered. By 20 August, Artois' troops had reached Veurne. The Flemish counterattack on Artois ended in a French victory at the 20 August 1297 Battle of Furnes. Five days later Lille surrendered to King Philip and the Flemish army, led by Robert of Bethune and 3000 men strong, was allowed to march out to Roeselare.

Although facing problems at home, at the end of August 1297 King Edward eventually moved an army of 895 knights and 7560 infantry and bowman to Flanders. Finding no support in Bruges, Edward I moved to Ghent and made that city his base of operations in Flanders. A large number of Scottish nobles, captured during the battle of Dunbar were required to serve during this campaign, as part of their conditional release from prisons in England.

== September 1297 ==
After the fall of Lille, the French main army marched upon Kortrijk and Ingelmunster. On 18 September 1297, Philip was met with a delegation from Bruges which surrendered the city to him. The city was occupied by French troops led by Raoul de Nesle and Guy IV, Count of Saint-Pol but its port Damme was retaken by an army of English, Welsh and Flemish troops led by Robert of Béthune. Meanwhile, Edward's Burgundian allies sacked the castle of Ornans in Franche-Comté and the Count of Bar led Welsh troops in plundering expeditions into French territory. Henry de Lacy, the king's capitaneus in Gascony, ravaged the Toulousaine after Philip had recalled the French field army to Flanders.

== Aftermath ==
Papal mediation led to an armistice, starting in October 1297. During this period negotiations between the French and English Kings and the other warring parties, including Count of Flanders, took place at the Papal court, while simultaneously strengthening the defenses of the Flemish towns in their hands. In February 1298, following a riot at Ghent, Edward moved to Aardenburg on the border of Zeeland. On 2 March, in an effort to make amends with the Gantois, he renewed their mercantile privileges in England. Five days later, 7 March, he renewed his military contract with the Burgundians led by Jean de Chalon-Arlay. When Edward sailed home to deal with William Wallace, the Burgundians carried on fighting the French on his behalf. They would not submit to Philip IV until 1301.
