= Rions =

- Commune
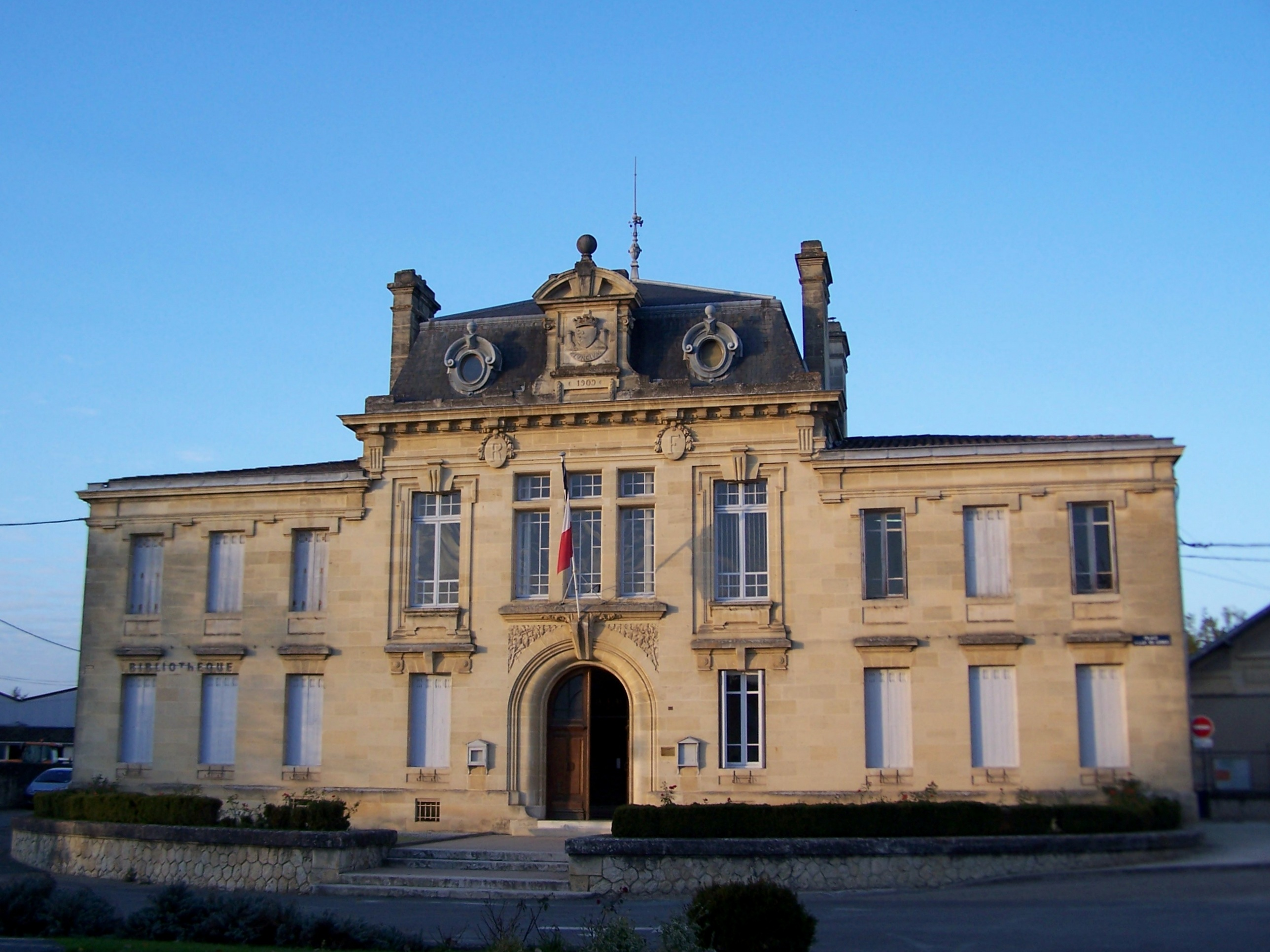
- The town hall in Rions

- Coat of arms
- Location of Rions
- Location within France Location within Nouvelle-Aquitaine
- Coordinates: 44°39′52″N 0°21′03″W
- Country: France
- Region: Nouvelle-Aquitaine
- Department: Gironde
- Arrondissement: Langon
- Canton: L'Entre-Deux-Mers

Government
  - Mayor (2020–2026): Vincent Joineau
- Area^{1}: 10.65 km^{2} (4.11 sq mi)
- Elevation: 104 m (341 ft)
- Highest elevation: 117 m (384 ft)
- Lowest elevation: 2 m (6.6 ft)
- Population (2023): 1,470
  - Density: 138/km^{2} (357/sq mi)
- Time zone: UTC+01:00 (CET)
  - Summer (DST): UTC+02:00 (CEST)
- INSEE/Postal code: 33355 /33410
- ^{1} French Land Register data, which excludes lakes, ponds, glaciers > 1 km^{2} (0.386 sq mi or 247 acres) and river estuaries.

Rions is a commune in the Gironde department in Nouvelle-Aquitaine in southwestern France.

== Population ==
Historical population
Year	Pop.	±% p.a.
1968	941	—
1975	989	+0.71%
1982	1,272	+3.66%
1990	1,379	+1.01%
1999	1,440	+0.48%
2007	1,533	+0.79%
2012	1,589	+0.72%
2017	1,556	−0.42%
2023	1,470	−0.94%
Source: INSEE

== See also ==
- Communes of the Gironde department
