= First War of Scottish Independence =

1296–1328 war between England and Scotland

- Part of the Wars of Scottish Independence
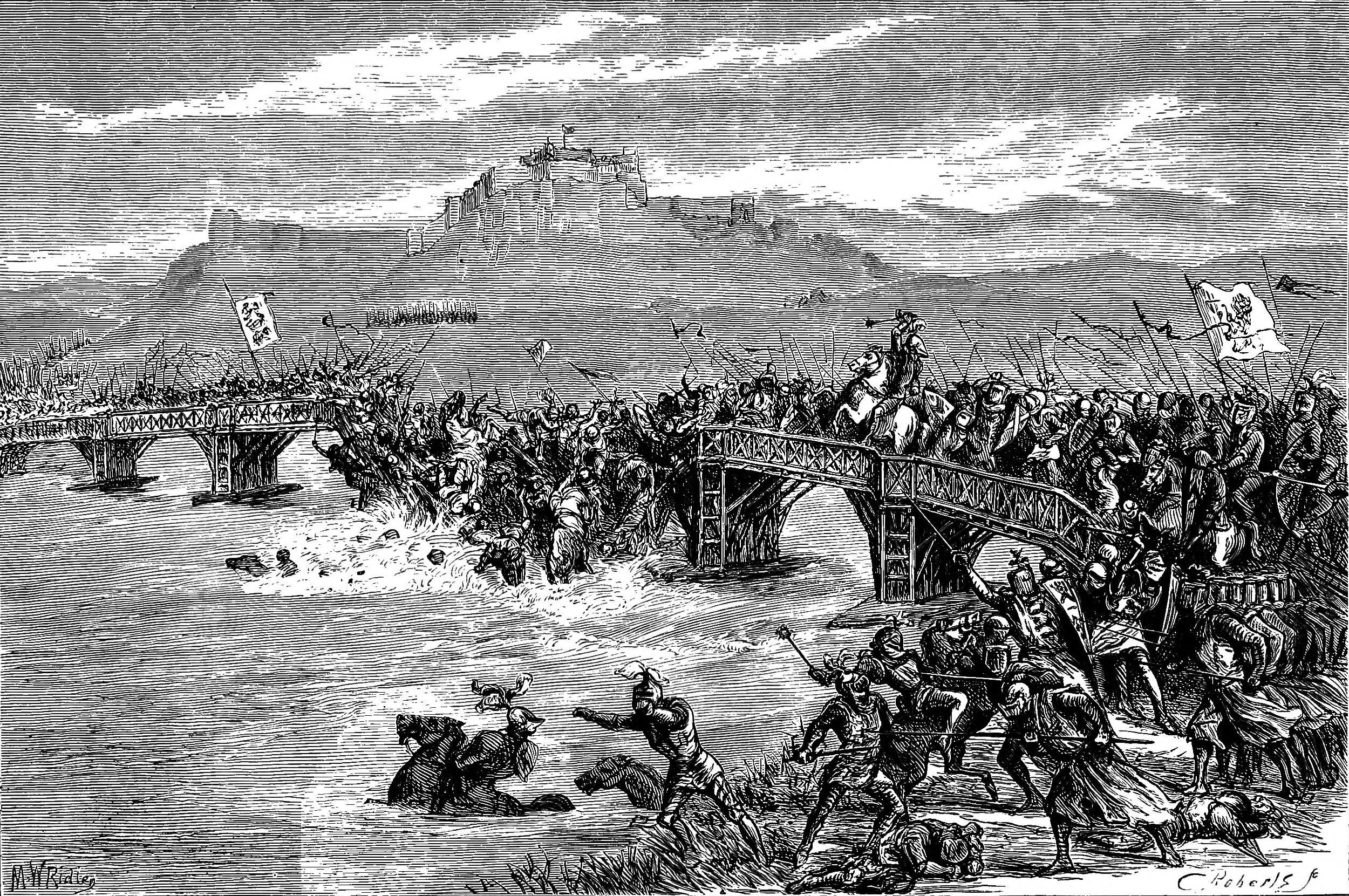
- The Battle of Stirling Bridge, fought on 11 September, 1297
Date	26 March 1296 (Note: 26 March 1296 is the day John "the Red" Comyn and his Scottish forces attacked Carlisle Castle in England. It was held for Edward I by Robert de Brus, who had a claim to the throne of Scotland and was allied with the English in opposition to the reigning Scottish king John Balliol.) – 1 May 1328 (32 years, 35 days)
Location	Scotland and England
Result	Scottish victory: Treaty of Edinburgh–Northampton; Scottish independence from England maintained, Robert the Bruce installed as King; English victory in Ireland; Reinstatement of Anglo-Scottish border from reign of Alexander III of Scotland

Belligerents
Kingdom of Scotland; Kingdom of France; Gaelic Ireland: Kingdom of Connacht; Kingdom of Thomond; Kingdom of Hy Many; Kingdom of Tyrconnell; Kingdom of Breffny; Kingdom of Oriel; Kingdom of Desmond; Kingdom of Moylurg	Kingdom of England: Lordship of Ireland; County Palatine of Durham

Commanders and leaders
John Balliol # William Wallace (executed) (Commander-in-chief until 1305); Robert I (Commander-in-chief from 1305); John "Red" Comyn X Andrew Moray (DOW); William the Hardy # James Douglas; Thomas Randolph; Edward Bruce †; Simon Fraser (executed); Angus Og MacDonald; Walter Stewart	Edward I # (1296–1307); Edward II X (1307–1327); Edward III (1327–1328); John de Warenne # Aymer de Valence # John of Brittany; Raymond Caillau †; Earl of Louth; Edmund Butler # Maurice FitzGerald; Antony Bek # Roger Mortimer

The First War of Scottish Independence was the first of a series of different wars between the Kingdom of England and the Kingdom of Scotland. It lasted from the English invasion of Scotland in 1296 until the de jure restoration of Scottish independence with the Treaty of Edinburgh–Northampton in 1328. De facto independence was established in 1314 AD following an English defeat at the Battle of Bannockburn. The wars were caused by the attempts of the English kings to seize territory by claiming sovereignty over Scotland, while the Scots fought to keep both English rule and authority out of Scotland.

The First War of Scottish Independence should not be viewed in isolation from the Gascon War and Franco-Flemish War since Philip IV of France and Edward I of England sought allies in Scotland and Flanders as part of their initial conflict. John Balliol of Scotland allied himself with Philip IV of France in 1295 (the Auld Alliance) while Guy, Count of Flanders allied himself with Edward I of England.

== Background ==
When King Alexander III (Note: Medieval Gaelic: Alaxandair mac Alaxandair; Modern Gaelic: Alasdair Mac Alasdair) ruled Scotland, the realm saw a period of peace and economic stability. On 19 March 1286, however, Alexander died after falling from his horse. The only living heir to his throne was Alexander's granddaughter, Margaret, Maid of Norway. As she was still a child, the Scottish lords prepared for her ascension by setting up a government of guardians. However, Margaret fell ill while sailing to Scotland and died in Orkney on 26 September 1290. With Alexander's line now extinct, a new period began known as the Competitors for the Crown of Scotland or the "Great Cause", with several families laying claim to the throne.

With Scotland threatening to descend into civil war, King Edward I of England was chosen by the Scottish nobility to serve as arbiter in resolving the succession dispute; he agreed to do so only after the claimants recognised him as lord paramount. A great feudal court was held in the castle at Berwick-upon-Tweed in early November 1292, at which John Balliol was judged to have the strongest claim to the throne of Scotland, based on the law of succession under primogeniture. (Other systems of succession, such as proximity of blood, would have instead favoured Robert the Bruce.) The decision to elect Balliol remains widely disputed between historians.

Edward quickly exploited his new status by interfering with and even overturning the decisions of Balliol and his advisers. He humiliated the Scottish king by forcing him to present himself as a common plaintiff before the English court when he protested Edward's actions. John's weakness disgusted the Scots, who gave him insulting names such as "Toom Tabard" or "Empty Coat". John finally renounced his homage to England in March 1296.

That same month, Edward invaded Scotland and stormed Berwick-upon-Tweed, sacking the town and directly threatening the Scottish crown. In April, an army summoned by John to repel the invasion was overwhelmingly defeated at the Battle of Dunbar in East Lothian. By July, John was deposed as king and sent into exile; though he did not formally claim the throne for himself, Edward forced over 1,800 Scottish nobles (many of the rest being prisoners of war at that time) to swear homage, thus making him, in effect, ruler of Scotland.

== Andrew Moray and William Wallace ==
=== Rise of Moray and Wallace ===
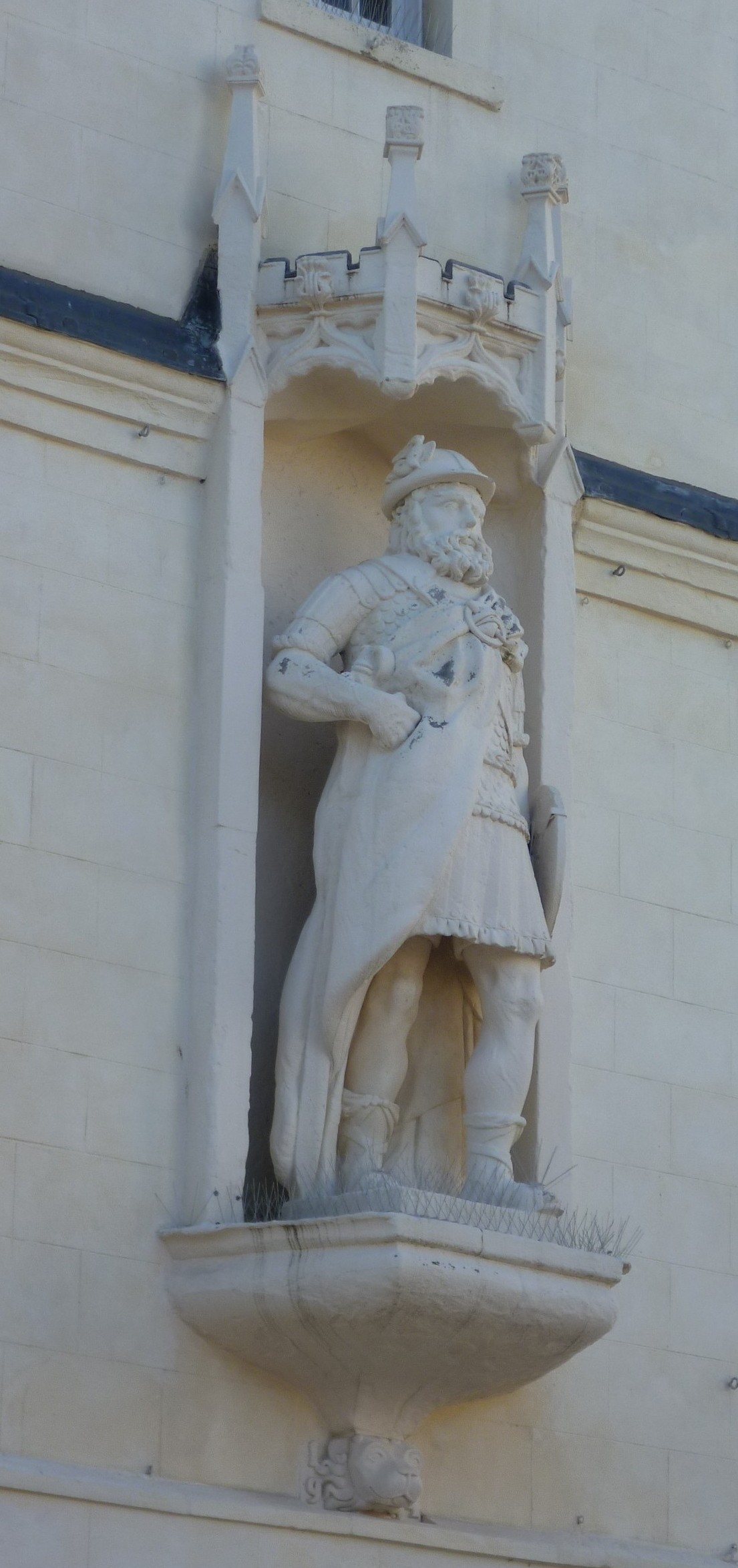
Wallace statue, Lanark

There was widespread discontent and disorder after the English Crown extended its dominion over Scotland. Acts of defiance were targeted at local English officials. In 1297, the country erupted in open revolt. Andrew de Moray and William Wallace emerged as the first significant Scottish patriots.

Andrew de Moray was the son of a northern landowner, Andrew de Moray of Petty. Andrew and his father were both captured in the rout after the Battle of Dunbar in April 1296. Andrew the younger was initially held captive in Chester Castle on the Anglo-Welsh border, from which he escaped during the winter of 1296–97. He returned to his father's castle at Avoch on the northern shore of the Moray Firth, where he raised his banner in the name of Scotland's king, John Balliol. Moray quickly gathered a band of like-minded patriots, and employing hit-and-run guerrilla tactics, began to attack and devastate every English-garrisoned castle from Banff to Inverness. The entire province of Moray was soon in revolt against King Edward I's men, and before long Moray had secured the region, leaving him free to turn his attention to the rest of the northeast of Scotland.

William Wallace rose to prominence in May 1297, when he killed William Haselrig, the English sheriff of Lanark, and members of his garrison at Lanark. It is possible Richard Lundie helped in the attack. When news of Wallace's attack on the English rippled throughout Scotland, men rallied to him. The rebels were supported by Robert Wishart, Bishop of Glasgow, who longed for the defeat of the English. The blessing of Wishart gave Wallace and his soldiers a degree of respectability. Previously, Scottish nobles had considered them mere outlaws. He was soon joined by William Douglas and others.

In early June, Wallace and Douglas planned a symbolic strike to liberate Scone, the seat of the English-appointed Justiciar of Scotland, William de Ormesby. It was from Scone, a site held sacred by the Scots, that Ormesby had been dispensing English justice. Ormesby was forewarned of Wallace's imminent assault and hastily fled.

On hearing about the start of an aristocratic uprising, Edward I, although engaged in events in France, sent a force of foot soldiers and horsemen under Henry Percy and Robert Clifford to resolve the "Scottish problem". On receiving reports that William Douglas had defected to the rebels, Edward dispatched Robert Bruce, Earl of Carrick, together with his father's vassals of Annandale, to attack Douglas's stronghold in Lanarkshire. Whilst traveling north to face Douglas, Bruce began to think about where his loyalties truly lay. He decided to follow the Scottish cause, being quoted as saying, "No man holds his flesh and blood in hatred, and I am no exception. I must join my own people and the nation in whom I was born."

The confederacy of men that Bruce joined included James the Steward, Robert Wishart and William Douglas. Dissension broke out in the Scottish camp when the Scottish and English armies met in July 1297 near Irvine. The aristocratic revolt apparently halted before it even started, but its leaders led long and futile negotiations. It has been suggested that this was a deliberate move in order to provide space and time for Wallace to levy and train men. Percy and Clifford assumed that this was the end of the problem and retired back to the south, only to be followed once more by Wallace and Moray. These two divided their forces and in a short time again forced the English south of the Forth, leaving them holding only the castle of Dundee.

While laying siege to Dundee Castle, Wallace heard that an English army was again advancing north, this time under John de Warenne, Earl of Surrey. Wallace put the leading men of the town of Dundee in charge of the castle's siege and moved to halt the advance of the English army. Wallace and Moray, who had recently combined their forces, deployed on the Ochil Hills overlooking the bridge crossing the River Forth at Stirling and prepared to meet the English in battle.

At the time, Wallace and Moray were both in their late twenties and neither could yet claim to be Scottish national heroes. Whereas some of the Scottish nobility had given in to English demands for allegiance (whilst still supporting the Scottish cause), Wallace's force remained unequivocally dedicated to the struggle for Scottish independence.

=== Stirling Bridge and Guardian of Scotland ===
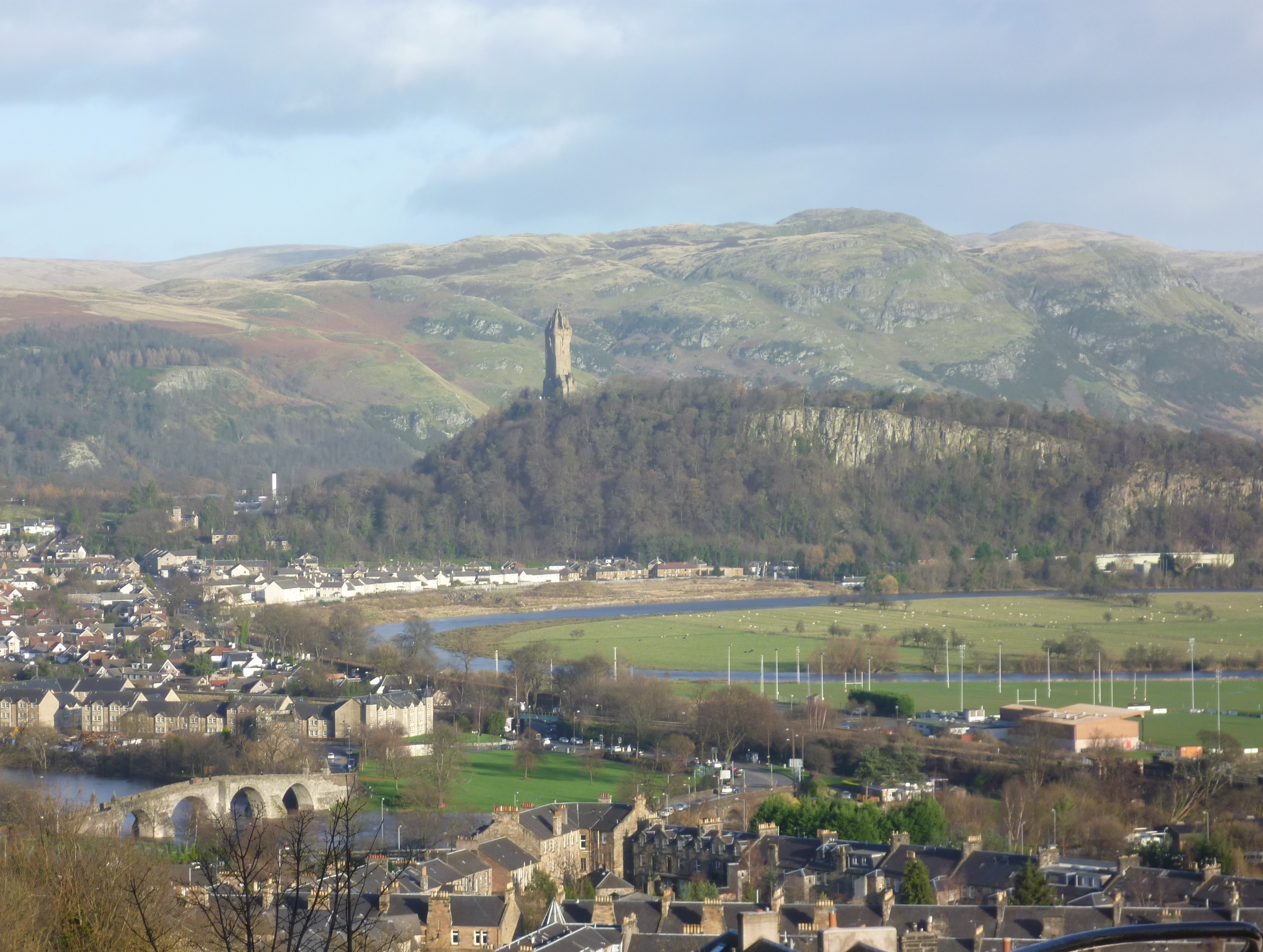
The site of the Battle of Stirling Bridge

On 11 September 1297, Scottish forces, under the joint command of Moray and Wallace, met the Earl of Surrey's army, at the Battle of Stirling Bridge. The Scottish army deployed to the north-east of the bridge, and let the vanguard of Surrey's army cross the bridge before attacking. The English cavalry proved ineffective on the boggy ground around the bridge, and many of them were killed. The bridge collapsed when English reinforcements were crossing. The English on the opposite side of the river then fled the battlefield. The Scots suffered relatively light casualties, but the death from wounds of Andrew Moray dealt a profound blow to the Scottish cause. Stirling Bridge was the first key victory for the Scots.

After clearing the English out of Scotland, Wallace turned his mind to the administration of the country. One of his early intentions was to reestablish commercial and diplomatic ties with Europe and win back the overseas trade that Scotland had enjoyed under Alexander III. Any evidence of his administrative acumen was probably destroyed by Edward's officials after his execution. There is, however, one Latin document in the archives of the Hanseatic town of Lübeck, which was sent on 11 October 1297 by "Andrew de Moray and William Wallace, leaders of the kingdom of Scotland and the community of the realm." It told the merchants of Lübeck and Hamburg that they now had free access to all parts of the kingdom of Scotland, which had, by favour of God, been recovered by war from the English.

Only one week after this document was signed, Wallace mounted an invasion of England. Crossing into Northumberland, the Scots followed the English army fleeing south in disarray. Caught between two armies, hundreds of refugees fled to safety behind the walls of Newcastle. The Scots laid waste a swathe of countryside before wheeling west into Cumberland and pillaging all the way to Cockermouth, before Wallace led his men back into Northumberland and fired 700 villages. On his return from England, laden with booty, Wallace found himself at the pinnacle of his power.

In March 1298, Wallace was knighted, reputedly by one of the leading nobles of Scotland, and was appointed Guardian of the Kingdom of Scotland in the name of the exiled King John Balliol. He began preparations for a confrontation with Edward.

In January 1298, Philip IV of France had signed a truce with Edward that did not include Scotland, thereby deserting his Scots allies. Edward returned to England from campaigning in France in March and called for his army to assemble. He moved the seat of government to York.

On 3 July he invaded Scotland, intending to crush Wallace and all those daring to assert Scotland's independence. On 22 July, Edward's army attacked a much smaller Scottish force led by Wallace near Falkirk. The English army had a technological advantage. Longbowmen slaughtered Wallace's spearmen and cavalry by firing scores of arrows over great distances. Many Scots were killed at the Battle of Falkirk. (It is impossible to give a precise number of the dead.) Despite the victory, Edward and his army soon returned to England and thus failed to subdue Scotland completely. However, the defeat had ruined Wallace's military reputation. He retreated to thick woods nearby and resigned his guardianship in December.

=== From Falkirk to execution ===
Wallace was succeeded as Guardian of the Kingdom jointly by Robert Bruce and John Comyn, but they could not see past their personal differences. This brought another shift in the political situation. During 1299, diplomatic pressure from France and Rome persuaded Edward to release the imprisoned King John into the custody of Pope Boniface VIII. The papacy also condemned Edward's invasions and occupation of Scotland in the papal bull Scimus, Fili. The bull ordered Edward to desist his attacks and start negotiations with Scotland. However, Edward ignored the bull.

William Wallace was sent to Europe to try to gain further support for the Scottish cause. Wallace went to France to seek the aid of Philip IV, and he possibly went on to Rome. William Lamberton, Bishop of St Andrews, was appointed as a third, neutral Guardian to try to maintain order between Bruce and Comyn. The Scots also recaptured Stirling Castle.

In May 1300, Edward I led a campaign into Scotland, invading Annandale and Galloway. Edward I's invasion force in the 1300 border campaign is one of the best-documented English armies of the medieval period. The king issued summons in December 1299 asking for feudal service from his magnates across the realm (with the exception of Wales, which Edward stated 'have leave to remain home, because of all the great work they have done in our service in the past'). The roll recording for the army showed that 40 knights and 366 mounted serjeants responded to this request with unpaid service, with a serjeant being counted as equal in worth to one half of a knight. Also accompanying them was 850 paid househeld men, mostly from the royal household. Several earls, such as the Earl of Gloucester and the Earl of Lincoln, showed up in person, but most did not. The cavalry were divided into four battalions, each consisting of 15–20 bannerets (60–80 total), each in command of on average 13 knights and squires (780–1,040 total). Edward also requested 16,000 infantry from his magnates, but was only able to muster 9,000 infantry, giving his army a total count of around 10,000. The infantry were grouped into units of 100, each commanded by an armoured serjeant, which were further subdivided into units of 20. The average daily rate of pay was 2d (two pence) for a spearman or billman, 12d (one shilling) for a serjeant, 24d (two shillings) for a knight, 6d for a hobelar, 6d for a mounted archer, 4-6d for a crossbowman, and 3d for a foot archer.

With the success of the English at Falkirk two years earlier, Edward must have felt in a position to bring Scotland under full control permanently. To do this required further campaigning, eliminating the last opposition and securing castles that were (or would be) centres of resistance. The English took control of Caerlaverock Castle, but apart from some small skirmishes, there was no action. In August, the Pope sent a letter demanding that Edward withdraw from Scotland. Due to the lack of success, Edward arranged a truce with the Scots on 30 October and returned to England.

That year, Robert Bruce finally resigned as joint guardian and was replaced by Ingram de Umfraville. In May 1301, de Umfraville, John Comyn and William Lamberton resigned as joint guardians and were replaced by John de Soulis as sole guardian. Soulis was appointed largely because he was not part of either the Bruce or the Comyn camps, and was a patriot. He was an active guardian, and made renewed efforts to have John Balliol returned to the Scottish throne.

In July 1301, Edward launched his sixth campaign into Scotland, aiming to conquer Scotland in a two-pronged attack. One army was commanded by his son, Edward, Prince of Wales, the other, the larger, was under his own command. The prince was to take the southwestern lands and the greater glory, so his father hoped. But the prince held cautiously to the Solway coast. Scot forces, commanded by de Soulis and de Umfraville, attacked the prince's army at Lochmaben in early September and maintained contact with his army as it captured Robert the Bruce's Turnberry Castle. They also threatened the king's army at Bothwell, which he captured in September. The two English armies met to winter at Linlithgow without having damaged the Scots' fighting ability. In January 1302, Edward agreed to a nine-month truce.

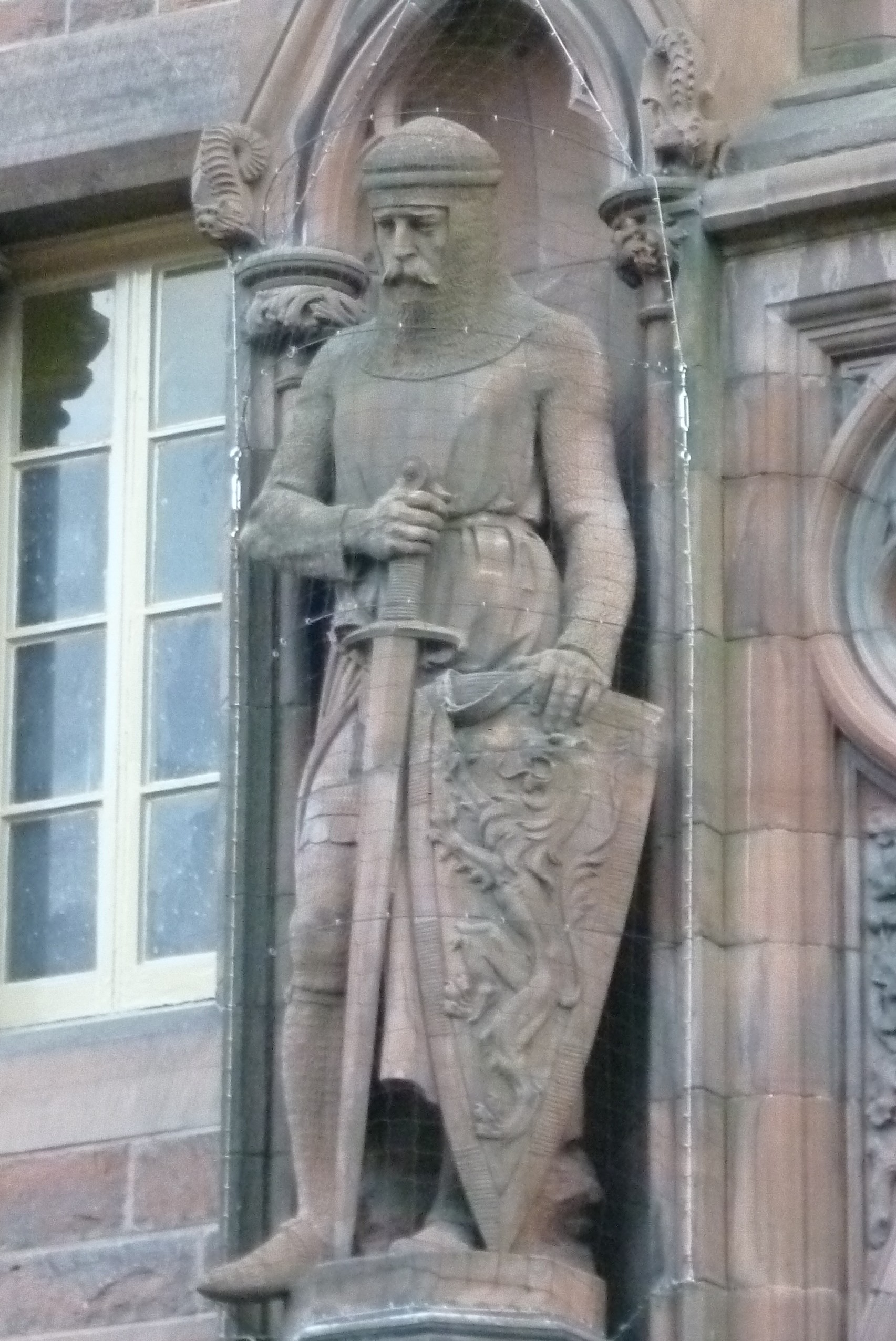
Wallace statue by D. W. Stevenson in the Scottish National Portrait Gallery, Edinburgh

It was around this time that Robert the Bruce, along with other nobles, gave his allegiance to Edward I, even though he had been on the side of the patriots until then. There are many reasons that may have prompted his turning. Not the least of them possibly was that Bruce found it loathsome to continue sacrificing his followers, family and inheritance for the exiled Scottish king John Balliol. There were rumours that Balliol would return with a French army and regain the Scottish throne. Soulis supported the return of Balliol as did many other nobles, but the return of John as king would lead to the Bruces losing any chance of ever gaining the throne themselves. Also, Robert's father was old and ill, and may have wished his son to seek peace with Edward, who, he was convinced, would eventually be victorious over the Scots. The elder Bruce would have seen that, if the rebellion failed and his son were against Edward, he would lose everything; titles, lands, and probably his life. Edward also had come to see that he needed a Scottish noble like Bruce as a friend, rather than as an enemy. He was facing both excommunication by the Pope for his actions and a possible invasion by the French.

Robert the Bruce's defection to the English king's side was not total. He sent a letter to the monks at Melrose Abbey in March 1302 that effectively weakened his usefulness to the English king. Apologizing for having called the monks to service in his army when there had been no national call up, Bruce pledged that, henceforth, he would "never again" require the monks to serve unless it was to "the common army of the whole realm", for national defence.

More serious to the Scottish patriots than the apparent defection of Bruce was the loss of support from Philip IV of France and subsequently, the Pope. Philip faced revolt at home and became too involved in his own difficulties to care about the Scots. He thus created a schism between the Scots' cause and the Pope, The Pope's support for the Scots faded without Philip's influence. It seemed that Philip had such difficulties that he signed a peace treaty with Edward that did not include any protection for the Scots. This act the Scots knew spelled their doom. A powerful Scottish delegation, led by Soulis, went to Paris that autumn to try to head off such an event. In his absence, Comyn was appointed as Guardian.

In November 1302, when the temporary truce between the Scots and the English ended, Edward delayed calling up his army until spring. Over that winter, however, he sent John Segrave and an army on a scouting expedition into the area west of Edinburgh. They were ambushed by Comyn and Simon Fraser, who had ridden all night to meet them. The Scots attack led to the capture of the severely wounded Segrave and, although his army later rescued him, the Scots were exultant at their victory. Their successes, however, were rendered useless when, in May 1303, Philip formally signed a peace with England and omitted any consideration for the Scots.

Edward I was now free from embarrassment abroad and at home, and having made preparations for the final conquest of Scotland, he commenced his invasion in the middle of May 1303. His army was arranged in two divisions—one under himself and the other under the Prince of Wales. Edward advanced in the east and his son entered Scotland by the west, but his advance was checked at several points by Wallace. King Edward reached Edinburgh by June, then marched by Linlithgow and Stirling to Perth. Comyn, with the small force under his command, could not hope to defeat Edward's forces. Edward stayed in Perth until July, then proceeded, via Dundee, Montrose and Brechin, to Aberdeen, arriving in August. From there, he marched through Moray, before his progress continued to Badenoch, before re-tracing his path back south to Dunfermline, where he stayed through the winter.

Early in 1304, Edward sent a raiding party into the borders, which put to flight the forces under Fraser and Wallace. With the country now under submission, all the leading Scots surrendered to Edward in February, except for Wallace, Fraser, and Soulis, who was in France. Terms of submission were negotiated on 9 February by John Comyn, who refused to surrender unconditionally, but asked that prisoners of both sides be released by ransom and that Edward agree there would be no reprisals or disinheritance of the Scots. The laws and liberties of Scotland would be as they had been in the day of Alexander III, and any that needed alteration would be with the advice of Edward and the advice and assent of the Scots nobles.

Excepting William Wallace and John de Soulis, it seemed that all would be forgiven after some of the more famous leaders were exiled from Scotland for various periods. Forfeited estates could be recovered by payment of fines levied in amounts deemed appropriate for each individual's betrayal. Inheritances would continue as they always had, allowing the landed nobility to pass on titles and properties as normal.

De Soulis remained abroad, refusing to surrender. Wallace was still at large in Scotland and, unlike all the nobles and bishops, refused to pay homage to Edward. Edward needed to make an example of someone, and, by refusing to capitulate and accept his country's occupation and annexation, Wallace became the unfortunate focus of Edward's hatred. He would be granted no peace unless he put himself utterly and absolutely under Edward's will. It was also decreed that James Stewart, de Soulis and Ingram de Umfraville could not return until Wallace was given up, and Comyn, Alexander Lindsay, David Graham and Simon Fraser were to actively seek his capture.

In May, having eliminated most Scottish opposition, Edward turned his attention to Stirling Castle, laying siege to it with great determination. Asked by its defender, William Oliphant, if he had permission to surrender or must hold the castle, Edward refused, saying, "If he thinks it will be better for him to defend the castle than yield it, he will see." After three months of bombardment with every siege engine Edward could bring to bear, the defenders still held the castle. When they could hold out no longer, they offered to surrender unconditionally, but Edward refused to accept. He would first bombard the castle with "Warwolf", his new trebuchet. After a day, the defenders of the destroyed castle were allowed to submit; about fifty men surrendered.

Meanwhile, while Robert Bruce outwardly maintained his loyalty to Edward, he was secretly advancing his own ambition and, while assisting Edward in the settlement of the Scottish government, on 11 June 1304, with both of them having witnessed the efforts of their countrymen at Stirling, Bruce and William Lamberton made a pact that bound them, each to the other, in "friendship and alliance against all men." If one should break the secret pact, he would forfeit to the other the sum of ten thousand pounds. Though both had already surrendered to the English, the pact signaled their commitment to their future perseverance for the Scots and their independence. They now intended to bide their time until the death of the elderly king of England.

Scotland lay defenceless and Edward set about amalgamating her into England. Homage was again paid to Edward by the nobles, and a parliament was held in May 1305 to elect those who would meet later in the year with the English parliament to establish rules for the governance of Scotland by the English. The Earl of Richmond, Edward's nephew, was to head the subordinate government of Scotland and control the castles of Roxburgh and Jedburgh. Justices were to be appointed in pairs, one Englishman and one Scot. Militarily strategic localities were to be controlled by English sheriffs and constables, but most others by Scots. A council was formed to advise the Earl of Richmond, including Bruce, Comyn and Lamberton. For all the apparent participation by Scots in the government, however, the English held the real power.

While all this took place, William Wallace was finally captured at Robroyston near Glasgow on 3 August 1305. He was delivered to the English by retainers in the service of John Menteith. Wallace had been easily the most hunted man in Scotland for years, but especially for the past eighteen months.

He was quickly taken through the Scottish countryside, his legs bound beneath his horse, towards London, where, after a show trial, the English authorities had him executed on 23 August 1305, at the Elms of Smithfield in the traditional manner for a traitor. He was hanged, then drawn and quartered, and his head placed on a spike on London Bridge. The English government displayed his limbs separately in Newcastle, Berwick, Stirling, and Perth.

== Robert the Bruce, King of Scots ==
=== The Dumfries spark ===
On 15 September, the English parliament met with the Scottish representatives to decide the ordinances of government for Scotland. In the midst of listing punishments to be meted out to other Scots, Edward ordered Robert Bruce to put his castle at Kildrummy "in the keeping of such a man as he himself will be willing to answer for". This suggests that Edward suspected Robert was not entirely trustworthy and may have been plotting behind his back. Bruce, as Earl of Carrick and now 7th Lord of Annandale, held huge estates and property in both Scotland and England, and had a claim to the Scottish throne. He also had a large family to protect. In addition to his wife Elizabeth and daughter Marjory, there were his brothers, Edward, Alexander, Thomas and Nigel, his sisters, Christian, Isabel (Queen of Norway), Margaret, Matilda and Mary, and his nephews Domhnall II, Earl of Mar and Thomas Randolph. If he claimed the throne, he would throw the country into yet another series of wars.

The pact which Bruce had made with Lamberton was not so secretly managed, and suspicions were awakened. This led to a conference with Comyn in which Bruce proposed, as the best means of preventing future trouble and for restoring their own privileges and the rights of Scots, that they should henceforward enter into an understanding with each other. Under this, Comyn would support Bruce's claim to the throne and receive Bruce's lands as compensation or vice versa. For some unknown motive, probably a desire to ruin his rival, Comyn revealed the conspiracy to Edward. Bruce was at the English court at this time and, after being forewarned, fled back to Scotland.

Bruce arrived in Dumfries and found Comyn there. At a private meeting with Comyn on the 10th of February, 1306 at the Greyfriars Church, Bruce reproached Comyn for his treachery, which Comyn denied. Furious, Bruce drew his dagger and stabbed, though not mortally, his betrayer. As Bruce ran from the church, his attendants, Kirkpatrick and Lindsay, entered and, finding Comyn still alive, killed him. Bruce and his followers then forced the local English judges to surrender their castle. Bruce realised that the die had been cast and that he had no alternative except to become either a king or a fugitive. The murder of Comyn – within a church – was an act of sacrilege, and he faced a future as an excommunicate and an outlaw. However his pact with Lamberton and the support of the Scottish church, who were prepared to take his side in defiance of Rome, proved to be of great importance at this key moment when Bruce asserted his claim to the Scottish throne.

=== Coronation ===
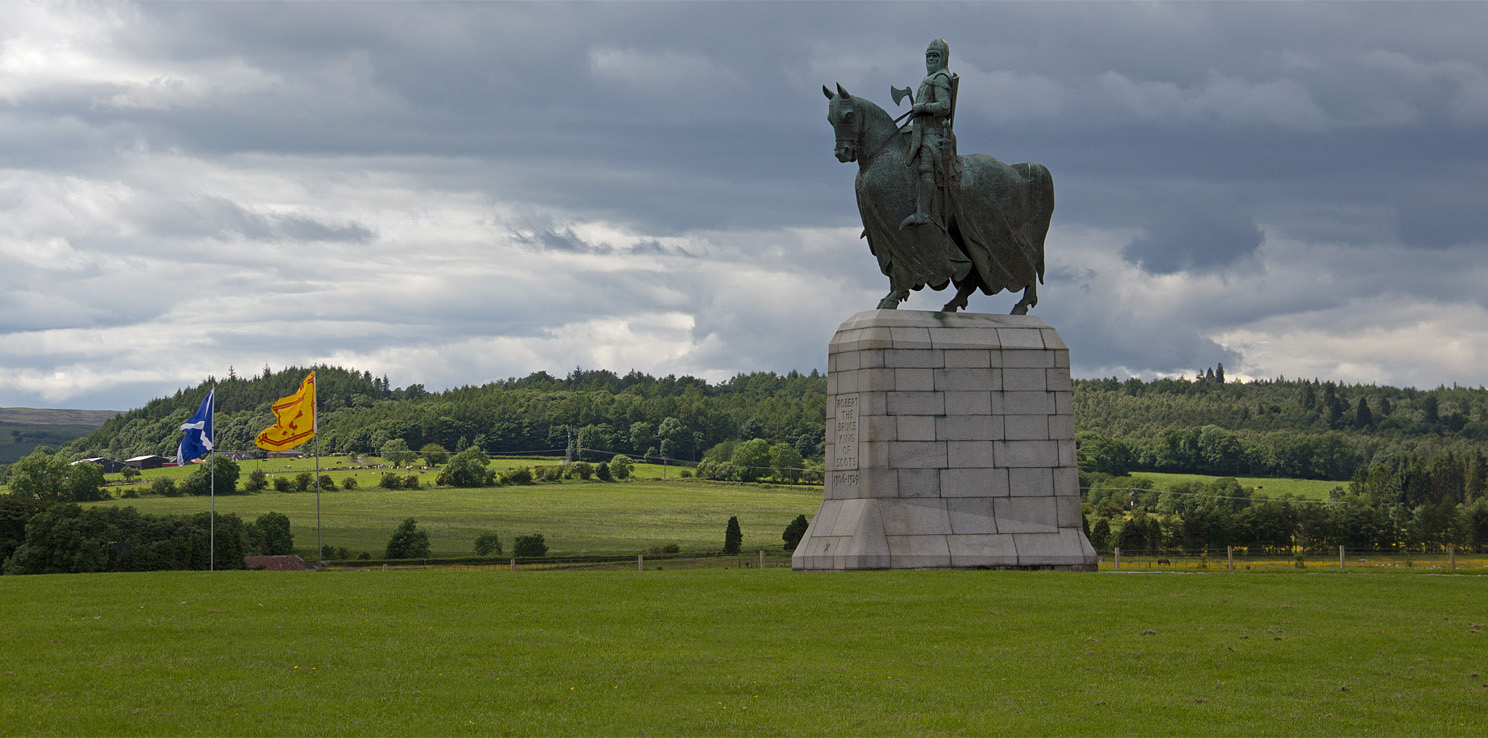
Statue of Robert the Bruce at Bannockburn

He went to Glasgow and met with the Bishop of Glasgow, Robert Wishart. Rather than excommunicate Bruce, Wishart absolved him and urged people to rise in his support. They both then travelled to Scone, where they were met by Lamberton and other prominent churchmen and nobles. Less than seven weeks after the killing in Dumfries, at Scone Abbey on 25 March 1306, Robert Bruce was crowned as King Robert I of Scotland.

He then began a new campaign to free his kingdom. After being defeated at the Battle of Methven, he was driven from the Scottish mainland as an outlaw. His wife, three of his brothers, his sisters, and daughter were captured by the English. The three brothers were hanged, drawn and quartered. Bruce later came out of hiding in 1307. The Scots thronged to him, and he defeated the English in a number of battles. His forces continued to grow in strength, encouraged in part by the death of Edward I in July 1307. The Battle of Bannockburn in 1314 was an especially important Scottish victory, after which the English released the female relatives of Bruce for exchange.

In 1320, the Declaration of Arbroath was signed by the community of the realm of Scotland and sent to Pope John XXII affirming Scottish independence from England. In 1327, Edward II of England was deposed and killed. The invasion of the North of England by Robert the Bruce forced the English to sign the Treaty of Edinburgh–Northampton on 1 May 1328, which recognised the independence of Scotland with Bruce as King. To further seal the peace, Robert's son and heir David married the sister of Edward III.

== See also ==
- Wars of Scottish Independence
- Second War of Scottish Independence
- Slighting
