= Treaty of Paris (1303) =

1303 treaty between France and England

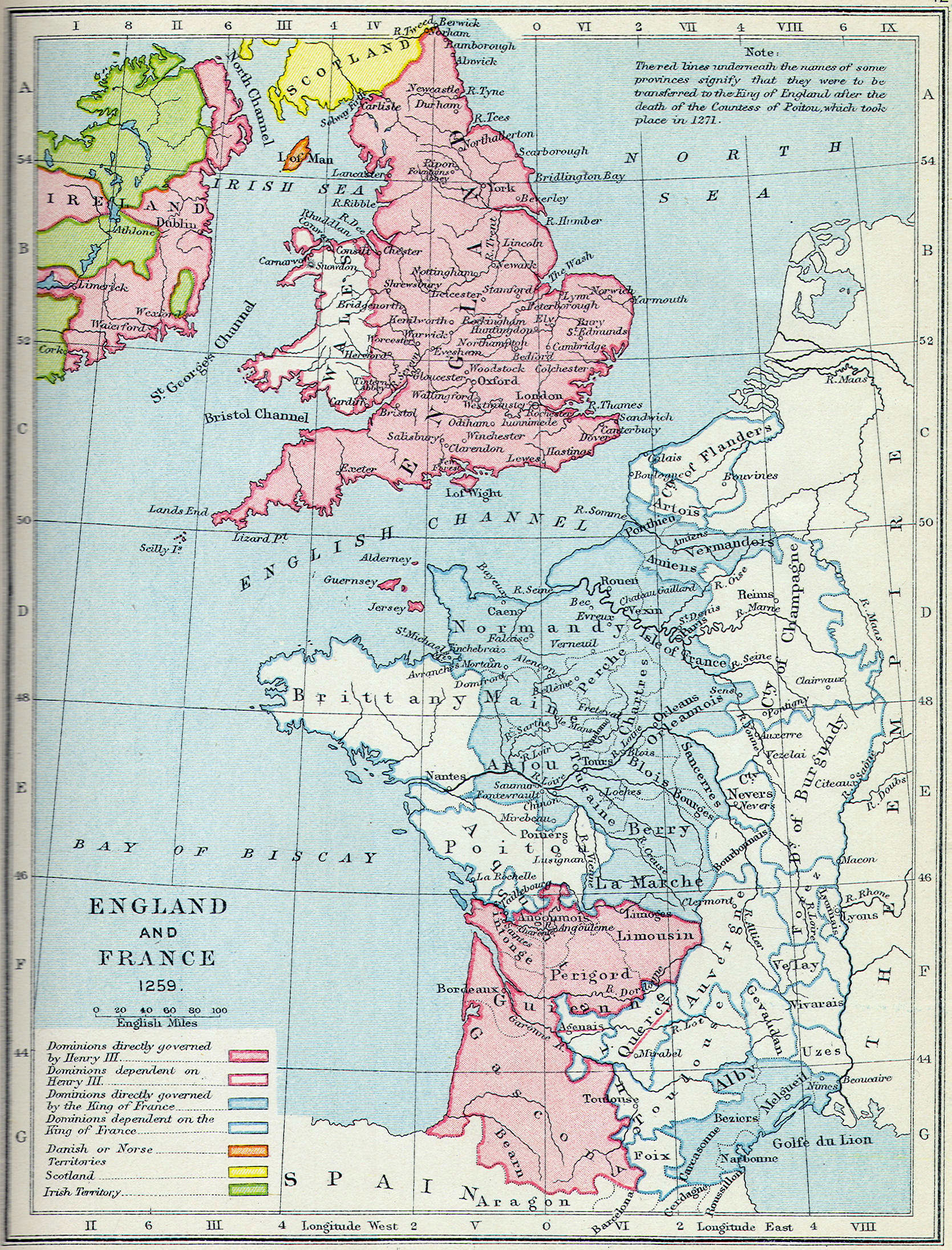
The English Angevin Empire and France after the 1259 Treaty of Paris and 1271 deaths of the Count and Countess of Poitou.

The 1303 Treaty of Paris was a peace treaty between King Edward I of England and Philip IV of France that ended the 1294–1303 Gascon War. It was signed at Paris on 20 May 1303, largely provided for a return to the status quo ante, and maintained peace between the two realms until the 1324 War of Saint-Sardos.

== Background ==
The 1066 conquest of England by William, duke of Normandy, created an awkward situation whereby the kings of England were sovereign over some of their territory but bound by homage to the kings of France for other rich and well-populated lands on the Continent. Under Henry II and his wife Eleanor, this swelled into what has become known as the Angevin Empire. The 1259 Treaty of Paris acknowledged the loss of Normandy, Maine, Anjou, and Poitou but left the English kings dukes of Aquitaine. With Philip IV attempting to assert more control over his kingdom, a fishing conflict in 1293 escalated into an attempt to end all English rule in France. Revolts in Scotland and in Flanders led both kings to accept mediation under nuncios of Pope Boniface VIII, leading to the 1299 treaties of Montreuil and Chartres. Edward married Philip's sister Margaret the same year.

Negotiations for a final treaty were made on behalf of Edward I by Amanieu VII, lord of Albret; Aymer de Valence, earl of Pembroke; John of Pontoise, bishop of Winchester; Amadeus V, count of Savoy; Henry de Lacy, earl of Lincoln; and Otto de Grandson, lord of the Isles. Philip's envoys included his brother Louis, count of Évreux; Robert II, duke of Burgundy; John II, duke of Brittany; and his chamberlain Pierre de Chambly.

== Terms ==
The treaty was agreed upon at Paris on 20 May 1303 and ratified by the Edward I in Scotland on 10 July.

Under the treaty, Philip IV committed to make all efforts to restore English control of the Duchy of Aquitaine by the 15th of Pentecost (9 June 1303) in exchange for Edward I's pledge to come to Amiens and personally swear fealty for the lands on Marymas (8 September 1303). Aquitaine would thus return to its status as a French fief, and its nobles were to owe dual allegiance to Edward as their duke and Philip as their king. Amnesty was granted to both sides and all hostages freed without further payment or obligation. Edward committed to recompense Philip for any improvements made to the land during its occupation, and Philip to provide equivalent or better towns, estates, etc. for any that were not returned to the English as before.

== Legacy ==
Peace was subsequently maintained between France and England until the 1324 War of Saint-Sardos. Edward II and Philip's daughter Isabella were married at Boulogne-sur-Mer on 25 January 1308. France resumed its policy of chipping away at English fiefs by hearing appeals at the Parlement de Paris. Continuing tensions over England's notional submission to the French king, however, set the stage for the 1337–1453 Hundred Years' War.

== See also ==
- List of treaties
- Franco-Flemish War
