= Gascon War =

1294–1303 Anglo-French war in Aquitaine

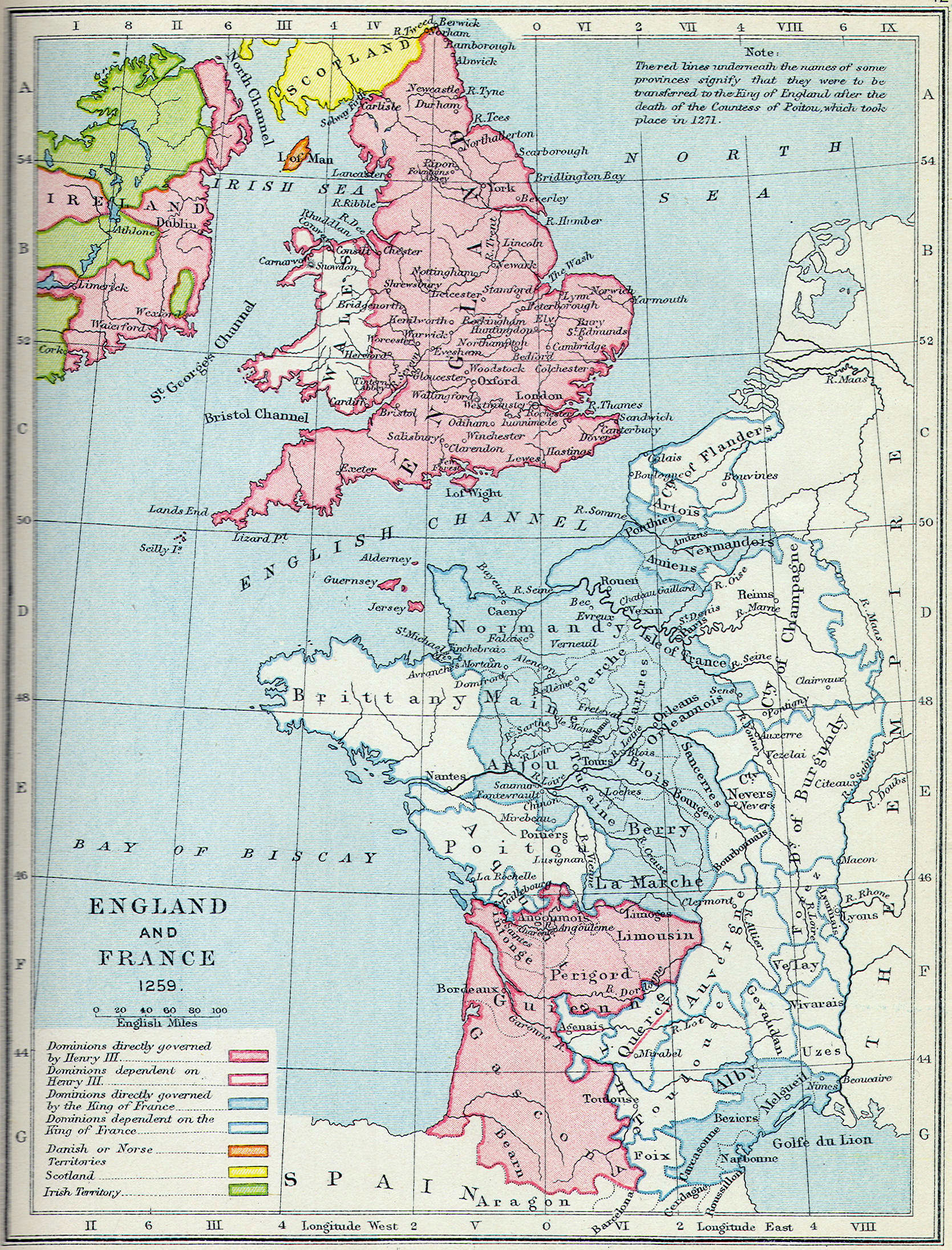
- The English Angevin Empire and France after the 1259 Treaty of Paris and the 1271 deaths of the Count and Countess of Poitou.
Date	1294–1303
Location	Flanders & Aquitaine (Guyenne & Gascony)
Result	Treaty of Paris: French occupation of Aquitaine ended with royal marriages. Aquitaine becomes a fief of France.

Belligerents
Kingdom of France	Kingdom of England

Commanders and leaders
Philip IV of France; Robert II, Count of Artois; Charles, Count of Valois; Guy, Marshall of France; Raoul, Constable of France; Roger-Bernard, Count of Foix	Edward I of England; John St John; John of Brittany; Edmund of Lancaster; Henry de Lacy, Earl of Lincoln

The Gascon War, also known as the 1294–1303 Anglo-French War or the Guyenne War (French: Guerre de Guyenne), was a conflict between the kingdoms of France and England. Most of the fighting occurred in the Duchy of Aquitaine, made up of the areas of Guyenne and Gascony. The ruling family of England, the House of Plantagenet, held Gascony as a fief of the King of France following the 1259 Treaty of Paris.

The Gascon War was the beginning of but part of a wider conflict that included the First War of Scottish Independence and the Franco-Flemish War as Philip IV of France and Edward I of England sought allies in Scotland and Flanders respectively, thus triggering these related conflicts.

It began with personal clashes between sailors in the English Channel in the early 1290s but became a widespread conflict over control of Edward I's continental holdings after he refused a summons from Philip IV and renounced his state of vassalage. The first phase of the war lasted from 1294 to 1298, by which time Flanders had risen in revolt against France and Scotland against England. Hostilities concluded for a time under papal mediation, with the terms of the 1299 Treaty of Montreuil providing for the betrothal of Edward's son Prince Edward and Philip's daughter Isabella. The same year, Edward I also married Philip IV's sister Margaret. The second phase ran from 1300 to 1303, until it was concluded by the 20 May 1303 Treaty of Paris, which reaffirmed the prince and princess's engagement. They were married in 1308.

== Background ==
At some point during Lent (20 February –3 April) in 1292, Norman and Bayonnais sailors quarreled over who would first draw water from a cistern on the Breton island of Quémènès. The dispute ended in murder, the Bayonnais in later Anglo-Gascon complaints but more likely the Norman, as related by Walter of Guisborough. Other Norman and French sailors then began to massacre and sink Aquitainian & English vessels, including pilgrim passengers, while both Edward and Philip and their officials gave numerous unheeded commands to keep the peace. Ships began to sail with only half their usual cargo to keep them more manoeuvrable in combat. Early the next year, an English convoy was ambushed off Brittany returning from Bordeaux and 70 ships were massacred and plundered at once; 2 other ships captured at St Malo and their crew flayed, some hanged in their skins alongside dogs. A still larger convoy left Portsmouth for Gascony on 24 April 1293 and—either due to contrary winds in their own account or prepared ambush in Heebøll-Holm's estimation—intercepted a Norman fleet in the 15 May 1293 Battle of Point St Mathieu, supposedly destroying 200 Norman ships. (The contemporary Chronicle of Bury St Edmunds notes a second victory over Normans, Germans, Flemings, and Lombards at St Mathieu on May 26.) A force from Bayonne then raided La Rochelle. On 29 May 1293, Edward I wrote to his chief ports, again prohibiting attacks on the French and banning men of the Cinque Ports from even engaging in peaceful trade for their failure to obey his previous commands; this embargo was to continue until a settlement could be reached with Philip.

These clashes caused Philip IV of France to formally complain in the autumn of 1293 that Edward I, king of England and duke of Aquitaine, had not ended the continued violence nor made restitution to its victims. The attack on La Rochelle was the primary complaint since it had formed part of the French royal demesne since 1271 and was thus a direct assault on Philip's property, but initial attempts of royal agents to extradite the known raiders were rebuffed and additional assaults and murders of Normans and French customs agents occurred in Aquitaine. Edward was formally indicted by the Parlement of Paris in January 1294. His brother Edmund was sent to Paris to negotiate: In secret and verbally, he agreed to provide Gascon hostages and allow a French occupation of Aquitaine's main strongholds for 40 days as a show of good faith; in exchange, Philip was to either remove Edward's personal indictment or provide for his safe conduct to the Parlement. France then occupied Aquitaine but maintained the citation without allowing for safe conduct or delay; the Parlement then declared Edward's fief in Aquitaine forfeit to the Crown on 19 May 1294. Edward then renounced his vassalage to Philip on 24 June 1294, leaving England and France at war. The accounts of the war in the Flores Historiarum and the Chronicle of Walter of Guisborough blamed the French volte-face on Philip's brother Charles of Valois; Peter Langtoft's and Robert Mannyng's blamed Philip, Charles, and Robert II, count of Artois, acting together.

== Aquitaine ==
With France already in possession of Aquitaine's main fortresses, Edward's expeditions from England to recover the duchy were largely unsuccessful, albeit with some relatively small-scale English successes. After various sieges and raids from the English and French forces, much of the Duchy was lost to the French under Charles, Count of Valois, then replaced by Robert II, Count of Artois. The main English army, under Henry de Lacy, was ambushed and defeated at the Battle of Bonnegarde in 1297 by Robert II d'Artois.

== Flanders ==
At great expense, Edward then retaliated by allying with Guy, count of Flanders; Henry III, count of Bar; John I, count of Holland; and Adolf, king of the Germans. Facing resistance from the English nobility who considered the continuing unrest in Wales and growing "Scottish problem" more pressing, Edward's expedition to Flanders was reduced in size and much delayed from his original plans.

Edward's force arrived in late August 1297, after the Flemish had already lost the Battle of Furnes to Robert II, count of Artois on August 20. From his base in Ghent and commanding an army largely composed of restive Welsh and Scots pressed into service, Edward was only able to support Henry III's putative raids of northern France before accepting a truce under papal auspices in October 1297. Pope Boniface VIII was particularly anxious to end the dispute between Philip and Edward because both kings had begun independently taxing the clergy and his initial response, the papal bull Clericis Laicos, had only led to the outlawing of English clerics and a French embargo on any export of precious metals or jewels from the country, damaging Boniface's own finances.

The armistice restored the status quo ante in northern France through January 1300 and Edward I returned to England in March 1298. In 1299, he ratified the Treaties of Montreuil and Chartres, betrothed his eldest surviving son Edward to Philip's daughter Isabella, and himself married Philip's sister Margaret. When the Franco-Flemish War resumed immediately upon the end of the armistice, King Edward I left Count Guy and his son Count Robert III to their capture and imprisonment in May 1300.

The Flemish burghers, however, then rebelled against their towns' French garrisons. Without English support, they decimated a generation of French nobility at Courtrai on 11 July 1302. Heavily indebted and at war in Scotland, Edward was still able to use Philip's precarious situation to finally recover control of Aquitaine in the status quo ante 1303 Treaty of Paris. France was then able to turn the tide against the Flemings and reach a settlement satisfactory to Philip in the 1305 Treaty of Athis-sur-Orge.

== Aftermath ==
At a time when warfare was placing an unprecedented strain on royal resources, Gascony also supplied manpower. No English king, therefore, could afford to risk a French conquest of Gascony, for too much was at stake. The peace of 1303 continued the potential for conflict by returning the duchy to Edward in exchange for homage. The English Kings as Dukes of Aquitaine owed feudal allegiance to the French King and the conflicting claims of suzerainty and justice were a frequent source of disputes. Given the inconveniences of the feudal relationship it may seem surprising that no wider conflict grew out of the Gascon situation before the 1330s. Yet until that decade the tensions arising from the English position in Gascony were contained and controlled. The war marked a watershed in relations between the two powers.

Similarly, the war occasioned the beginning of chronic insubordination against France on the part of Flanders.
