= List of battles involving the Kingdom of Scotland =

This is a chronological list of the battles involving the Kingdom of Scotland, as well as battles involving Scotland in support of France as part of the "Auld Alliance" .

The list gives the name, the date, the present-day location of the battles, the Scottish allies and enemies, and the result of these conflicts following this legend:

Scottish military victory
Scottish military defeat
Indecisive or unclear outcome

== Early battles (875–1275) ==
Battle	Date	Location	Allies	Enemies	Result
Battle of Dollar	875	Stirlingshire, Scotland	None	Denmark	Defeat
Battle of Brunanburh	937	Uncertain	Kingdom of Dublin Kingdom of Strathclyde	Kingdom of England	Defeat
Battle of Bauds	962	Banffshire, Scotland	None	Norsemen	Victory
Siege of Durham (1006)	1006	County Durham, England	None	Kingdom of England	Defeat
Battle of Barry	1010	Angus, Scotland	None	Denmark	Victory
Battle of Cruden Bay	1012	Aberdeenshire, Scotland	None	Denmark	Victory
Battle of Carham	1016 or 1018	Northumberland, England	Kingdom of Strathclyde	Kingdom of England	Victory
Siege of Durham (1040)	1040	County Durham, England	None	Kingdom of England	Defeat
Battle of Dunsinane	1054	Perthshire, Scotland	None	Kingdom of England	Defeat
Battle of Alnwick	13 November 1093	Northumberland, England	None	Kingdom of England	Defeat
Battle of Clitheroe	10 June 1138	Lancashire, England	None	Kingdom of England	Victory
Battle of the Standard	22 August 1138	Yorkshire, England	None	Kingdom of England	Defeat
Battle of Renfrew	1164	Near Renfrew, Scotland	None	Kingdom of the Isles	Victory
Battle of Alnwick	13 July 1174	Northumberland, England	None	Kingdom of England	Defeat
Battle of Enbo	1259	Dornock, Scotland	None	Denmark	Victory
Battle of Largs	2 October 1263	Ayrshire, Scotland	None	Kingdom of Norway	Indecisive
Battle of Ronaldsway	8 October 1275	Isle of Man	None	Manx rebels	Victory

== First War of Scottish Independence (1296–1327) ==
Battle	Date	Location	Allies	Enemies	Result
Capture of Berwick	30 March 1296	Berwickshire, Scotland	None	Kingdom of England	Defeat
Battle of Dunbar	27 April 1296	Dunbar, Scotland	None	Kingdom of England	Defeat
Action at Lanark	1297	Lanarkshire, Scotland	None	Kingdom of England	Victory
Raid of Scone	1297	Perthshire, Scotland	None	Kingdom of England	Victory
Battle of Stirling Bridge	11 September 1297	Stirling, Scotland	None	Kingdom of England	Victory
Battle of Falkirk	22 July 1298	Falkirk, Scotland	None	Kingdom of England	Defeat
Battle on the Cree	August 1300	Dumfries and Galloway, Scotland	None	Kingdom of England	Defeat
Battle of Roslin	24 February 1303	Midlothian, Scotland	None	Kingdom of England	Victory
Action at Happrew	February 1304	Peebles, Scotland	None	Kingdom of England	Defeat
Siege of Stirling Castle	April–July 1304	Stirling, Scotland	None	Kingdom of England	Defeat
Battle of Methven	19 June 1306	Perthshire, Scotland	None	Kingdom of England	Defeat
Battle of Dalrigh	Summer 1306	Dalrigh, Scotland	None	Clan MacDougall Clan Macnaghten	Defeat
Battle of Turnberry	February 1307	Ayrshire, Scotland	None	Kingdom of England	Victory
Battle of Loch Ryan	9–10 February 1307	Dumfries and Galloway, Scotland	None	Kingdom of England	Defeat
Battle of Glen Trool	March 1307	Dumfries and Galloway, Scotland	None	Kingdom of England	Victory
Battle of Loudoun Hill	10 May 1307	Ayrshire, Scotland	None	Kingdom of England	Victory
Siege of Roxburgh Castle	1314	Roxburghshire, Scotland	None	Kingdom of England	Victory
Siege of Edinburgh Castle	1314	Edinburgh, Scotland	None	Kingdom of England	Victory
Battle of Bannockburn	23–24 June 1314	Stirlingshire, Scotland	None	Kingdom of England	Victory
Battle of Moiry Pass	September 1315	County Armagh, Northern Ireland	Irish allies	Lordship of Ireland	Victory
Battle of Connor	September 1315	County Antrim, Northern Ireland	Irish allies	Lordship of Ireland	Victory
Siege of Carlisle	1315	Carlisle, England	None	Kingdom of England	Defeat
Battle of Kells	November 1315	County Meath, Ireland	Irish allies	Lordship of Ireland	Victory
Battle of Skerries	26 January 1316	County Kildare, Ireland	Irish allies	Lordship of Ireland	Victory
Battle of Skaithmuir	February 1316	Berwickshire, Scotland	None	Kingdom of England	Victory
Capture of Berwick	April 1318	Berwickshire, Scotland	None	Kingdom of England	Victory
Battle of Faughart	14 October 1318	County Louth, Ireland	Irish allies	Lordship of Ireland	Defeat
Battle of Myton	20 September 1319	Yorkshire, England	None	Kingdom of England	Victory
Battle of Old Byland	14 October 1322	Yorkshire, England	None	Kingdom of England	Victory
Battle of Stanhope Park	3–4 August 1327	County Durham, England	None	Kingdom of England	Victory

== Second War of Scottish Independence (1332–1357) ==
Battle	Date	Location	Allies	Enemies	Result
Battle of Kinghorn	6 August 1332	Fife, Scotland	None	Edward Balliol and the Disinherited	Defeat
Battle of Dupplin Moor	10–11 August 1332	Perthshire, Scotland	None	Edward Balliol and the Disinherited	Defeat
Battle of Annan	16 December 1332	Dumfries and Galloway, Scotland	None	Edward Balliol and the Disinherited	Victory
Siege of Berwick (1333)	March – 20 July 1333	Northumberland, England	None	Kingdom of England	Defeat
Battle of Dornock	25 March 1333	Dumfries and Galloway, Scotland	None	Kingdom of England	Defeat
Battle of Halidon Hill	19 July 1333	Berwickshire, Scotland	None	Kingdom of England	Defeat
Battle of Boroughmuir	30 July 1335	Edinburgh, Scotland	None	Kingdom of England	Victory
Battle of Culblean	30 November 1335	Aberdeenshire, Scotland	None	The Disinherited and supporters of Edward Balliol	Victory
Battle of Panmuir	28 November 1337	Panbride, Forfarshire, Scotland	None	Kingdom of England	Victory
Battle of Neville's Cross	17 October 1346	County Durham, England	None	Kingdom of England	Defeat
Battle of Nesbit Moor	August 1355	Berwickshire, Scotland	None	Kingdom of England	Victory
Sieges of Berwick (1355 and 1356)	6 November 1355 – 13 January 1356	Berwick-upon-Tweed, England	None	Kingdom of England	Defeat

== Border Wars ==
Battle	Date	Location	Allies	Enemies	Result
Battle of Duns	1372	Berwickshire, Scotland	None	Kingdom of England	Victory
Battle of Melrose (1378)	1378	Melrose, Scottish Borders, Scotland	None	Kingdom of England	Victory
Battle of Otterburn	5/19 August 1388	Northumberland, England	None	Kingdom of England	Victory
Battle of Fulhope Law	September 1400	Northumberland, England	None	Kingdom of England	Defeat
Battle of Nesbit Moor	22 June 1402	Berwickshire, Scotland	None	Kingdom of England	Defeat
Battle of Humbleton Hill	14 September 1402	Northumberland, England	None	Kingdom of England	Defeat
Battle of Shrewsbury	21 July 1403	Shrewsbury, Shropshire, England	House of Percy; Principality of Wales	Kingdom of England	Defeat
Battle of Yeavering	22 July 1415	Northumberland, England	None	Kingdom of England	Defeat

== Hundred Years' War (1337–1453) ==
Battle	Date	Location	Allies	Enemies	Result
Battle of Fresnay	3 March 1420	France	Kingdom of France	Kingdom of England	Defeat
Battle of Baugé	21 March 1421	France	Kingdom of France	Kingdom of England	Victory
Battle of Cravant	31 July 1423	France	Kingdom of France Duchy of Brittany	Kingdom of England Duchy of Burgundy	Defeat
Battle of Verneuil	17 August 1424	France	Kingdom of France	Kingdom of England Duchy of Burgundy	Defeat
Siege of Orléans	12 October 1428 – 8 May 1429	France	Kingdom of France	Kingdom of England	Victory
Battle of the Herrings	12 February 1429	France	Kingdom of France	Kingdom of England	Defeat
Battle of Jargeau	10–12 June 1429	France	Kingdom of France	Kingdom of England	Victory
Battle of Meung-sur-Loire	15 June 1429	France	Kingdom of France	Kingdom of England	Victory
Battle of Beaugency	15–16 June 1429	France	Kingdom of France	Kingdom of England	Victory
Battle of Patay	18 June 1429	France	Kingdom of France	Kingdom of England	Victory

== Anglo-Scottish wars ==
Battle	Date	Location	Allies	Enemies	Result
Battle of Piperdean	10 September 1436	Berwickshire, Scotland	None	Kingdom of England	Victory
Battle of Sark	23 October 1448	Dumfries and Galloway, Scotland	None	Kingdom of England	Victory
Capture of Roxburgh	August 1460	Roxburghshire, Scotland	None	Kingdom of England	Victory
Capture of Berwick	July and August 1482	Berwickshire, Scotland	None	Kingdom of England under House of York	Defeat
Battle of Lochmaben Fair	22 July 1484	Lochmaben, Scotland	None	Kingdom of England	Victory
Battle of Flodden	9 September 1513	Northumberland, England	Part of the War of the League of Cambrai	Kingdom of England	Defeat
Battle of Haddon Rig	24 August 1542	Teviotdale, Scotland	None	Kingdom of England	Victory
Battle of Solway Moss	24 November 1542	Cumbria, England	None	Kingdom of England	Defeat

== Nine Years' War (Sometimes called The Rough Wooing) ==
Battle	Date	Location	Allies	Enemies	Result
Burning of Edinburgh	7 May 1544	Edinburgh, Scotland	None	Kingdom of England	Defeat
Battle of Ancrum Moor	27 February 1545	Roxburghshire, Scotland	None	Kingdom of England	Victory
Battle of Pinkie Cleugh	10 September 1547	Musselburgh, Scotland	None	Kingdom of England	Defeat
Battle of Drumlanrig	20 February 1548	Thornhill, Dumfries and Galloway, Scotland	None	Kingdom of England	Victory
Sieges of Haddington	1548-1549	Haddington, Scotland	Kingdom of France	Kingdom of England	Victory
Battle of St Monans	1549	Fife, Scotland	Kingdom of France	Kingdom of England	Victory

== Border skirmishes ==
Battle	Date	Location	Allies	Enemies	Result
Raid of the Redeswire	7 July 1575	Northumberland, England	None	Kingdom of England	Victory

== See also ==
- List of wars involving Scotland
- Military history of Scotland

=== Sources ===
- Dodds, Glen Lyndon (1999). Battles in Britain. London: Brockhampton Press. ISBN 1860199429.
- Green, Howard (1983). The battlefields of Britain and Ireland. London: Constable. ISBN 0-0946-4520-5.
