= William Prendergast (died 1333) =

Scottish knight of the Wars of Scottish Independence

Sir William Prendergast (Note: Also William Prenderguest.) (died 19 July 1333) was a knight who fought in the Wars of Scottish Independence. He fought on both the English and Scottish sides and was killed while fighting on the Scottish side during the Battle of Halidon Hill.

== Life ==
Prendergast, who held lands at Cornhill-on-Tweed, Northumberland and Stirlingshire, Scotland, was a member of the English garrison at Berwick Castle in 1311. William was congratulated for his gallant service in the English garrison at Jedburgh Castle in January 1315. He was later accused of handing the castle over to the Scots. He had entered King Robert I of Scotland’s peace after the English defeat at the Battle of Bannockburn, with his lands at Cornhill-on-Tweed confiscated, by the English. With Sir William Keith and Alexander Gray, led a force of around 200 Scottish cavalry, with some difficulty, to force their way across the ruins of the bridge to the northern bank of the Tweed and then make their way into Berwick, in an attempt to relieve Berwick, under siege by an English army led by King Edward III of England.

The Berwick defenders argued that cavalry constituted the relief according to the truce and that they did not have to surrender the town or castle of Berwick to the English. Edward III stated that this was not the case: they had to be relieved directly from Scotland, whereas the relief force had approached Berwick from the direction of England. The Guardian of Scotland Archibald Douglas considered that the town had been relieved and sent messages to Edward III calling on him to depart, threatening that if he failed to do so the Scots army would devastate England. Edward III ruled that this was a breach of the agreement and commenced construction of gallows outside the town walls with the Scottish hostage Thomas Seton, the son of the Alexander Seton, the Governor of Berwick, was hanged in front of his parents. Edward III issued instructions that each day the town failed to surrender, another two hostages should be hanged.

As a result, Keith, who had taken over the command of the town from Seton, concluded a fresh truce, promising to surrender if not relieved by Tuesday 20 July. Keith, Grey and Prendergast were allowed immediately safe passage to leave Berwick and to travel to wherever Douglas happened to be, advise him of the change of circumstances and return safely to Berwick. They found Douglas at Bamburgh in Northumberland. The Scottish army crossed the Tweed to the west of the English army position, reaching Duns. The following day, the Scottish army approached Halidon Hill from the north-west, ready to give battle with the English. During the battle, Prendergast was killed. His son William was able to regain the lands of Cornhill-on-Tweed.
