= Alexander de Seton =

Alexander de Seton may refer to:

- Sir Alexander Seton (Governor of Berwick) (fl. 1311–1340), also known as Alexander de Seton, signed the Declaration of Arbroath of 1320
- Sir Alexander Seton (d. 1332), also known as Alexander de Seton, noble
