= Alexander Seton (died 1332) =

- Died: 6 August 1332; Kinghorn Wester, Fife, Scotland
- Spouse: Margaret
- Father: Alexander Seton
- Mother: Christian Cheyne

Sir Alexander Seton (d. 1332), also known as Alexander de Seton, was a 13th–14th-century noble. He was married to Margaret Murray. He died during the Battle of Kinghorn on 6 August 1332.

== Life ==
Alexander was the eldest son of Alexander Seton and Christian Cheyne. Alexander married Margaret Murray, and died without issue. Alexander's sister Margaret, who became the heiress of Seton after the deaths of her brothers, married Alan de Wyntoun, and their eldest son William adopted the name and arms of Seton. Alexander's brother Thomas was given as a hostage during the Siege of Berwick in 1333 and was executed, due to the terms of the hostages being broken. During the same siege, another brother, William, drowned during an attack on the English fleet. Alexander's father, was the Governor of Berwick who surrendered Berwick after the Scots were defeated at the Battle of Halidon Hill in 1333.

Seton was serving under Donnchadh IV, Earl of Fife in a force of 1,000 men attempting to oppose the landing of Edward Balliol, at Kinghorn Wester (now Burntisland), Fife on 6 August 1332. While leading a charge on foot at the head of a force of 300, Alexander was killed. Different contemporary sources variously give the total Scottish losses as 90, 900 or 1,000.
