= Archibald Douglas (died 1333) =

Scottish noble (1297–1333)

Sir Archibald Douglas
- Born: before 1298
- Died: 19 July 1333; Halidon Hill, Kingdom of Scotland
- Occupation: Scottish military leader during the Wars of Scottish Independence
- Spouse: Beatrice de Lindsay
- Children: 3, including William Douglas, 1st Earl of Douglas
- Parent(s): William the Hardy, Lord of Douglas; Eleanor de Lovaine
- Family: Clan Douglas

Sir Archibald Douglas (before 1298 – 19 July 1333) was a Scottish nobleman, Guardian of Scotland, and military leader. He is sometimes given the epithet "Tyneman" (Old Scots: Loser), but this may be a reference to his great-nephew Archibald Douglas, 4th Earl of Douglas. He fought and died at the Battle of Halidon Hill.

== Early life ==
The younger son of Sir William "le Hardi" Douglas, the Governor of the castle at Berwick-upon-Tweed, and his wife, Eleanor de Lovaine, Douglas was also half-brother of "the Good" Sir James Douglas, King Robert the Bruce's deputy.

The earliest mention of Douglas is in 1320 when he received a charter of land at Morebattle in Roxburghshire and Kirkandrews in Dumfriesshire from King Robert. In 1324, he was recorded as being granted the lands of Rattray and Crimond in Buchan and the lands of Conveth, Kincardineshire, already being possession of Cavers in Roxburghshire, Drumlanrig and Terregles in Dumfriesshire, and the lands of West Calder in Midlothian. By the time of his death, he was also in possession of Liddesdale.

History then keeps quiet about Douglas except whilst serving under his older brother, James, in the 1327 campaign in Weardale, where his foragers "auoint curry apoi tot levesche de Doresme"- overran nearly all the Bishopric of Durham. (Scalacronica)

== Second War of Independence ==
Following the death of King Robert I and his half brother's crusade with the dead king's heart, Douglas once again becomes of note. He was made guardian of the kingdom since he was "the principal adviser in...the confounding of the king" as much as he was heir to his brothers influence after Murray's capture.

During the Second War of Scottish Independence, Edward Balliol, son of King John Balliol, had invaded Scotland with the backing of Edward III of England, inflicting a defeat on the Scots at the Battle of Dupplin Moor. Douglas served under Patrick V, Earl of Dunbar leader of the second army that aimed to crush the smaller Balliol force. Following the rout of the Earl of Mar's force Dunbar did not engage the disinherited but retreated allowing Edward Balliol to be crowned at Scone, thus probably avoiding another crushing defeat. As a sweetener to the English, Edward Baliol agreed to cede the county, town and castle of Berwick to England in perpetuity. However Douglas led the Bruce loyalist defeat on Balliol at the Battle of Annan, forcing him to flee back to England.

=== Battle of Halidon Hill ===
Edward III came north to personally command his army, thus making the violation of the peace treaty official, and laid siege to Berwick-upon-Tweed. However, a temporary truce was declared with the stipulation that if not relieved within a set time, Sir Alexander Seton, the governor, would deliver the castle to the English. Douglas raised an army to relieve the beleaguered defenders of Berwick. As a feint to draw the English away he invaded Northumberland, but was forced to return to Berwick when the English refused to be lured. On 19 July, Edward's army took positions at the summit of Halidon Hill, a summit some mile and a half north of the town with commanding views of the surrounding country. Douglas' numerically superior force attacked up the slope and was slaughtered by the English archers, a prelude, perhaps, to the battles of Crécy and Agincourt. The English won the field with little loss of life, however by the close of the fight, countless Scots common soldiery, five Scots Earls, and the Guardian Douglas lay dead. The following day Berwick capitulated.

Archibald was succeeded by his son, William Douglas, 1st Earl of Douglas.

== Marriage and issue ==
Sir Archibald Douglas married Beatrice de Lindsay, daughter of Sir Alexander de Lindsay of Barnweill, an ancestor of the Earls of Crawford. They had three children:

- John Douglas (d.b. 1342 in the retinue of David II of Scotland in France)
- William Douglas, 1st Earl of Douglas
- Eleanor Douglas married five times –
1. Alexander, Earl of Carrick, natural son of Edward Bruce, King of Ireland (k. 1333, Battle of Halidon Hill)
2. Sir James de Sandilands, ancestor of the Lords of Torphichen (d.b. 1358)
3. Sir William Tours of Dalry (d.b. 1368)
4. Sir Duncan Wallace of Sundrum (d.b. 1376)
5. Sir Patrick Hepburn of Hailes, ancestor of the Earls of Bothwell
