= William Keith of Galston =

Scottish knight of the Wars of Scottish Independence

William Keith

Personal details
- Died: 1337
- Parent: Robert de Keith

Sir William Keith of Galston (died 1337) was a Scottish Knight who fought in the Wars of Scottish Independence. He brought the bones of James Douglas, as well as King Robert I of Scotland's heart, back to Scotland after Douglas was killed on crusade in Spain.

== Life ==
Keith was the son of Robert de Keith, and grandson of John de Keith King's Marischal.

Keith fought alongside Thomas Randolph, Earl of Moray, and James Douglas, Lord of Douglas, during the street fighting during the capture of the town of Berwick from the English in 1318, which led to the surrender of Berwick Castle.

Upon the death of Robert I of Scotland in 1329, he accompanied Sir James Douglas with a retinue of Scottish nobles on crusade. The party stopped first at Sluys, Flanders, where confirmation was received that Alfonso XI of Castile was preparing a crusading campaign against the Muslims of the kingdom of Granada. The Scots sailed on to Seville, Spain to meet Alfonso XI and pledge their support. He was one of the few survivors of Douglas's party of knights and men-at-arms who survived the siege and battle of Teba, not being able to take part in the skirmish, after suffering a broken arm. He was responsible for returning the King's heart and Douglas' bones to Scotland, where the King's heart was buried at Melrose Abbey, and Douglas's remains solemnly interred in the kirk of St Bride in Douglas.

He was in command at Berwick again in 1333 when the disastrous English victory at Halidon Hill took place. In 1334, he captured the English nobleman Richard Talbot, an ally of Edward Balliol, as he was attempting to pass into England from the north.

In 1335 Keith was an ambassador to England, and in 1337 he was fighting at the Siege of Stirling Castle, where he was killed.

== Issue ==
William Keith had a daughter:

- Jonetta Keith, married 1st David Hamilton of Cadzow; married 2nd Alexander Stewart of Darnley.
