= Francis le Chen =

Scottish noble

Sir Francis le Chen, or Cheyne of Straloch, was a 14th-century Scottish noble. He was the son of Sir Reginald le Chen (d.1312) and Mary, daughter of Freskin de Moravia of Duffus and of Strabok and Lady Johanna de Strathnaver.

== Family ==
He married Isabel, daughter of John Comyn, Earl of Buchan and Isabella MacDuff, and had the following known issue:

- Henry of Straloch, died without issue, succeeded by brother Reginald.
- Christiane, married Alexander Seton (Governor of Berwick).
- Reginald, married Janet, daughter of William Marischal.
- Francis, Dean of Aberdeen.
