= John Seton, 1st Baron Parbroath =

Arms of Seton of Parbroath:Or, three crescents within a double tressure flory counter-flory gules, in the centre a mullet for difference.

John de Seton of Parbroath (died 1327) was a Scottish noble.

== Life ==
Seton is said to be the fourth son of Alexander de Seton and Christian le Cheyne. His father bestowed on him Elizabeth Ramsay, the heiress of Parbroath, after Alexander was appointed as her guardian.

== Marriage and issue ==
John, married Elizabeth Ramsay and they are known to have the following issue:

- Alexander Seton
