= Edmond de Caillou =

Gascon night

Edmond de Caillou or Raymond de Caillou (also spelt Calhou, Calhau, Cailow; died 1316) was a Gascon knight who fought during the First War of Scottish Independence.

== Life ==
Caillou is believed to have been a native of Bordeaux. It has also been suggested that he was a nephew of Piers Gaveston, Edward II of England's favourite. Certainly another nephew of Gaveston with the same name, Bertrand de Caillou, was working to secure Gaveston's position in early 1312. King Edward, like his father Edward I, as Duke of Aquitaine, used men such as Caillou, drawn from his French fiefs in his Scottish wars especially to man the frontier in such Castles such as Roxburgh and Berwick.

In some sources Caillou is described as the governor of Berwick Castle, but the governor at that time was Sir Maurice de Berkeley It is more likely that Caillou was the Captain of the Gascon troops within the garrison.

In 1315 the harvest failed in southern Scotland and Northern England and by winter the garrison at Berwick was at such extremity that they were forced to eat their horses, and was being affected by desertion. Caillou and others of the Gascons suggested a raid into Scots held territory to replenish the stores of the Castle, Berkeley refused his permission as the countryside was full of Scots soldiery, and his main commission was the defence of the town and castle of Berwick. Caillou and the others mutinied, saying it were better to die fighting than starve behind the walls.

On 14 February 1316, Caillou lead his men in a foray to within two leagues of Melrose Abbey, and split his men into companies to seize livestock and sufficient menfolk from the peasantry to herd them. Caillou's company once they had seized sufficient spoils returned towards Berwick driving the cattle before them. Caillou's progress was noted by Sir Adam de Gordon whose lands had been ravaged and he reported this to the King's lieutenant and Warden of the Marches, Sir James Douglas. Douglas with Sir William de Soulis, and Henry de Baliol of Branxholme, with a company of men rode after the Gascons, and came across them just north of the town of Coldstream. On hearing of the pursuit. Caillou ordered the cattle and prisoners on to Berwick, and formed up in battle line to meet Douglas. Douglas's force was faced by double the number of Gascons that had been reported to him, earlier accounts of the numbers of men having been underestimated because of their dispersal throughout the countryside.

Douglas drew his outnumbered men up behind a ford, and awaited the onslaught from the Gascons, Douglas and Caillou met at the first opportunity and mortal combat between them commenced. Caillou was slain by Douglas, and his men dispirited by the loss of their captain fled. Douglas was later to say that his fight against Caillou and his Gascons at the Battle of Skaithmuir was the toughest fight he had had in his career.
