= Battle of Kinghorn =

Battle of the Second War of Scottish Independence

Coordinates: 56°03′36″N 3°13′52″W

- Part of the Second War of Scottish Independence
Date	6 August 1332
Location	Wester Kinghorn (modern Burntisland)
Result	English victory

Belligerents
Kingdom of Scotland	Balliol supporters assisted by: Kingdom of England

Commanders and leaders
Earl of Fife; Lord Liddesdale; Alexander Seton †	Edward Balliol; Henry de Beaumont

Strength
~4,000	1,500 • 500 men-at-arms • 1,000 infantry

Casualties and losses
90, 900 or 1,000	Unknown, but few, if any

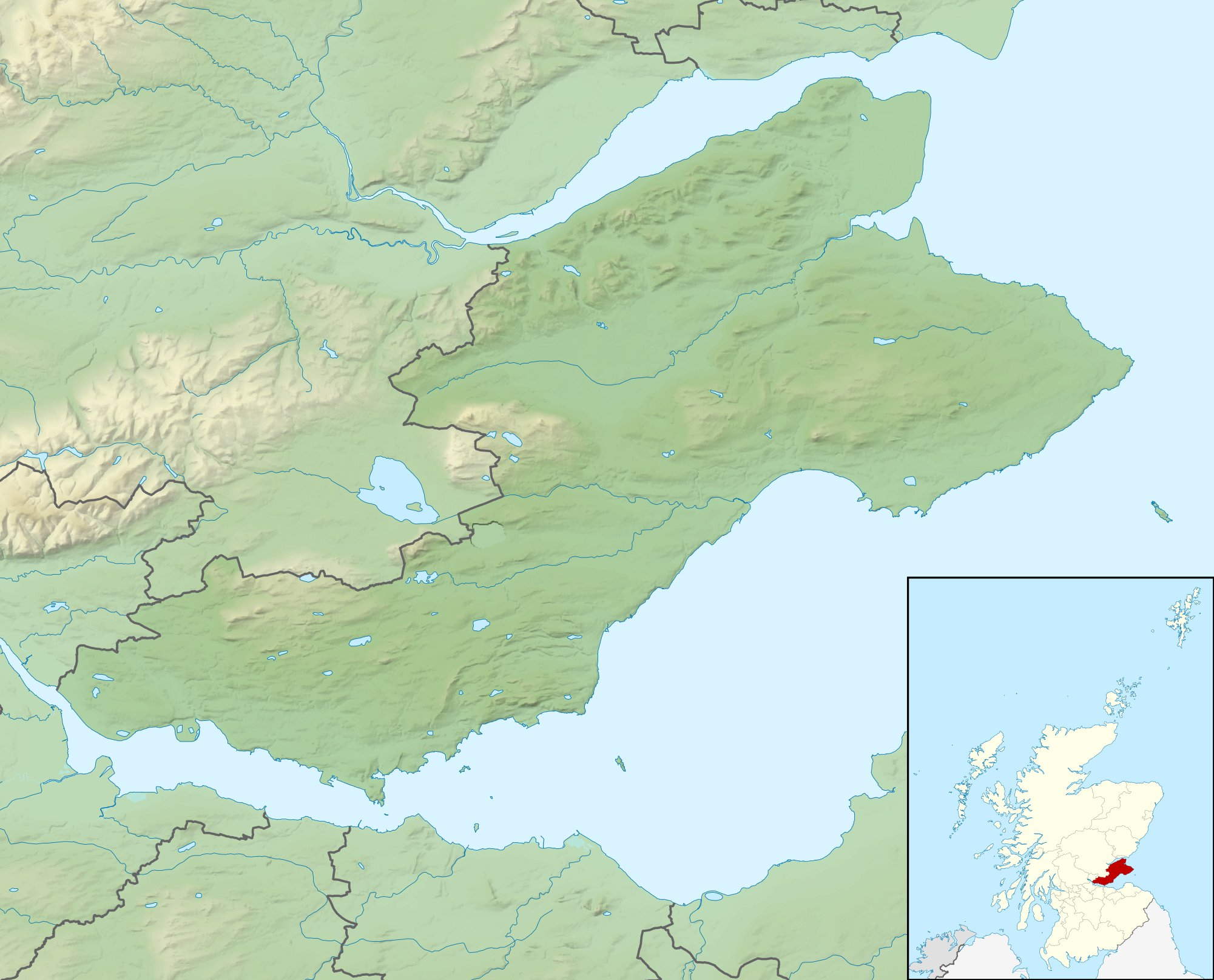
The location of the battle within modern Fife

The Battle of Kinghorn was fought on 6 August 1332 at Wester Kinghorn (now Burntisland), Fife, Scotland. An invading seaborne force of 1,500 men was commanded by Edward Balliol and Henry Beaumont, Earl of Buchan. A Scottish army, possibly 4,000 strong, commanded by Duncan, Earl of Fife, and Robert Bruce, Lord of Liddesdale (an illegitimate son of King Robert the Bruce) was defeated with heavy loss. Balliol was the son of King John Balliol and was attempting to make good his claim to be the rightful king of Scotland. He hoped that many of the Scots would desert to him.

Balliol and Beaumont's forces were still disembarking from their ships when the Scots attacked them. The Scots pressed hard, but were beaten off by English longbowmen and some supporting infantry even before Balliol's men-at-arms could get ashore. The Scottish losses are disputed, but included several nobles. The invaders fought the main Scottish army five days later at the Battle of Dupplin Moor and inflicted a crushing defeat. Balliol was crowned king of Scotland on 24 September.

== Background ==
The First War of Scottish Independence between England and Scotland began in March 1296, when Edward I of England (r. 1272–1307) stormed and sacked the Scottish border town of Berwick as a prelude to his invasion of Scotland. The 30 years of warfare that followed ended in the Weardale campaign, during which the newly-crowned 14-year-old King Edward III was nearly captured. This disastrous campaign brought Edward's regents, Isabella of France and Roger Mortimer, to the negotiating table. They agreed to the Treaty of Northampton with Robert the Bruce (r. 1306–1329) in 1328 but this was widely resented in England and commonly known as turpis pax, "the shameful peace". Some Scottish nobles refused to swear fealty to Bruce and were disinherited; they left Scotland to join forces with Edward Balliol, son of King John Balliol (r. 1292–1296), whom Edward I had deposed in 1296.

Robert Bruce died in 1329; his heir was five-year-old David II (r. 1329–1371). In 1331, under the leadership of Edward Balliol and Henry Beaumont, Earl of Buchan, the disinherited Scottish nobles gathered in Yorkshire and plotted an invasion of Scotland. Edward III was aware of the scheme and officially forbade it. The reality was different, and Edward III was happy to cause trouble for his northern neighbour. He insisted that Balliol not invade Scotland overland from England but ignored his forces sailing for Scotland from Yorkshire ports on 31 July 1332. The Scots were aware of the situation and were waiting for Balliol. David II's regent was an experienced old soldier, Thomas Randolph, 1st Earl of Moray. He had prepared for Balliol and Beaumont, but he died ten days before they sailed.

== Battle ==
Balliol's force was small, only 1,500 men: 500 men-at-arms and 1,000 longbowmen. He anticipated being joined by large numbers of Scots once he had landed. While they were underway, the Scots selected Donald, Earl of Mar, as the new guardian, or regent, and divided their large army: Mar commanded the part north of the Firth of Forth, while Patrick, Earl of March, commanded those to the south. Balliol had been in communication with Mar and hoped that he would desert to him, with many of his troops. Knowing Mar to be commanding the troops on the northern shore of the firth, Balliol landed there, at Wester Kinghorn (present day Burntisland), on 6 August 1332.

While the invaders were still disembarking they were confronted by a large Scottish force commanded by Duncan, Earl of Fife, and Robert Bruce, Lord of Liddesdale (an illegitimate son of King Robert the Bruce). Contemporary and near-contemporary English chronicles record their number variously as 4,000, 10,000, 14,000 and 24,000. Scottish sources imply that the force was much smaller. The historian Clifford Rogers says, based on the presence of both Fife and Bruce, that 4,000 "is probably the closest to the truth". The Scots attacked the part of the English force on the beach, but were driven off after a hard-pressed assault by the fire of English longbowmen and by their supporting infantry, before Balliol and Beaumont's men-at-arms could get ashore.

Scottish accounts of the time dismiss their losses as trivial, while one English source gives 90 Scots killed, two give 900, and a fourth 1,000. One chronicle, the Brut, reports that Fife was "full of shame" at being defeated by such a small force. Five or six nobles were among the dead, including Sir Alexander Seton. There is no record of casualties suffered by Balliol's men. Buoyed by this victory, Balliol and Beaumont's force completed their disembarkation and marched to Dunfermline, where they looted a Scottish armoury. Mar withdrew to the capital, Perth, amalgamated the survivors of Kinghorn and sent out a general call for reinforcements.

== Aftermath ==
On 11 August Balliol's force met Mar's army at the Battle of Dupplin Moor, where the Scots vastly outnumbered the invaders; by ten to one according to an estimate by Rogers. Despite this the Scots suffered a serious defeat, with thousands killed, including much of the nobility. Balliol was crowned king of Scotland at Scone, the traditional place of coronation for Scottish monarchs, on 24 September. Balliol's support within Scotland was limited and within six months it had collapsed. He was ambushed by supporters of David II at the Battle of Annan a few months after his coronation. Balliol fled to England half-dressed and riding bareback. He appealed to Edward III for assistance. Edward supported him, inflicted a defeat on the Scots at the Battle of Halidon Hill in July 1333 and put Balliol back on the Scottish throne. Balliol was deposed again in 1334, restored again in 1335 and finally deposed in 1336, by those loyal to David II.

== Citations and sources ==
=== Sources ===
- Barrow, Geoffrey Wallis Steuart (1965). Robert Bruce and the Community of the Realm of Scotland. London: Eyre and Spottiswoode. OCLC 655056131.
- DeVries, Kelly (1998) [1996]. Infantry Warfare in the Early Fourteenth Century: Discipline, Tactics, and Technology. Woodbridge, Suffolk; Rochester, NY: Boydell & Brewer. ISBN 978-0851155715.
- Nicholson, Ranald (1961). "The Siege of Berwick, 1333". The Scottish Historical Review. XXXX (129): 19–42. JSTOR 25526630. OCLC 664601468.
- Nicholson, Ranald (1974). Scotland: The Later Middle Ages. University of Edinburgh History of Scotland. Edinburgh: Oliver and Boyd. ISBN 978-0-05002-038-8.
- Ormrod, Mark (1990). The Reign of Edward III. Yale Medieval Monarchs series. New Haven: Yale University Press. ISBN 978-0-300-11910-7.
- Rodwell, Warwick (2013). The Coronation Chair and Stone of Scone: History, Archaeology and Conservation. Oxford: Oxbow Books. ISBN 978-1-78297-153-5.
- Rogers, Clifford (2014) [2000]. War Cruel and Sharp: English Strategy under Edward III, 1327–1360. Woodbridge, Suffolk: Boydell Press. ISBN 978-0-85115-804-4.
- Sumption, Jonathan (1990). Trial by Battle. The Hundred Years' War. Vol. I. London: Faber and Faber. ISBN 978-0-57120-095-5.
- Weir, Alison (2006). Queen Isabella: Treachery, Adultery, and Murder in Medieval England. New York: Random House. ISBN 978-0-34545-320-4.
- Wyntoun, Andrew (1907). Amours, François Joseph (ed.). The Original Chronicle of Scotland. Vol. II. Edinburgh: Blackwood. OCLC 61938371.
