= Battle of Drumlanrig =

1548 battle of the Anglo-Scottish Wars

- Part of the Anglo-Scottish Wars
| Date | 20 February 1548 |
| Location | Thornhill, Dumfries and Galloway, Scotland, United Kingdom 55.274°N 3.810°W |
| Result | Scottish victory, collapse of the English in Western Scotland |

Belligerents
| Kingdom of England | Kingdom of Scotland |

Commanders and leaders
| Thomas Wharton; Jack Musgrave | Earl of Angus |

Strength
| 3,000 | Unknown but much smaller |

Casualties and losses
| Almost all the English cavalry, plus the desertion of 400 Scots "Assured Men" | Unknown, relatively light |

The Battle of Drumlanrig (1548) was a small but significant battle involving The Earl of Angus' forces intercepting a larger English force at Drumlanrig. The English defeat cost them much of their cavalry, which left the main army vulnerable to Scottish men at arms and borderers, who could now raid supply lines and the main English force at will, leaving them vulnerable forcing their retreat and liberating the Western Lowlands, which greatly helped Scotland win the war. Scottish Borderers fighting for the English, so called "Assured Men" led the English army into an ambush, where they suffered heavy losses while fighting their way to safety. The English cavalry was largely destroyed, due to the fact that it went ahead to raid and was far from the infantry body. Due to the skilled leadership of Jack Musgrave, who was the English infantry captain the now stranded force was able to make an orderly withdraw. This likely only happened due to Wharton's son's timely intervention and Musgraves' leadership, who was able to hold the English lines and prevent a full rout. Unfortunately for Angus, a small body of Scots infantry coming from the south, likely seeking to catch what they though would be a fleeing English force, was defeated due to the English maintaining order in retreat and getting to the flanking force before the main Scottish host could catch them. This caused fears of invasion on the now largely defenseless English West Marches, who could no longer intercept the Scottish cavalry. Thomas Wharton, in an appeal for help wrote a letter lamenting that "This poor country is now destitute, not only of all the gentlemen, but most of the true men in the wardenry, and also of good horses".
