= Battle of Melrose (1378) =

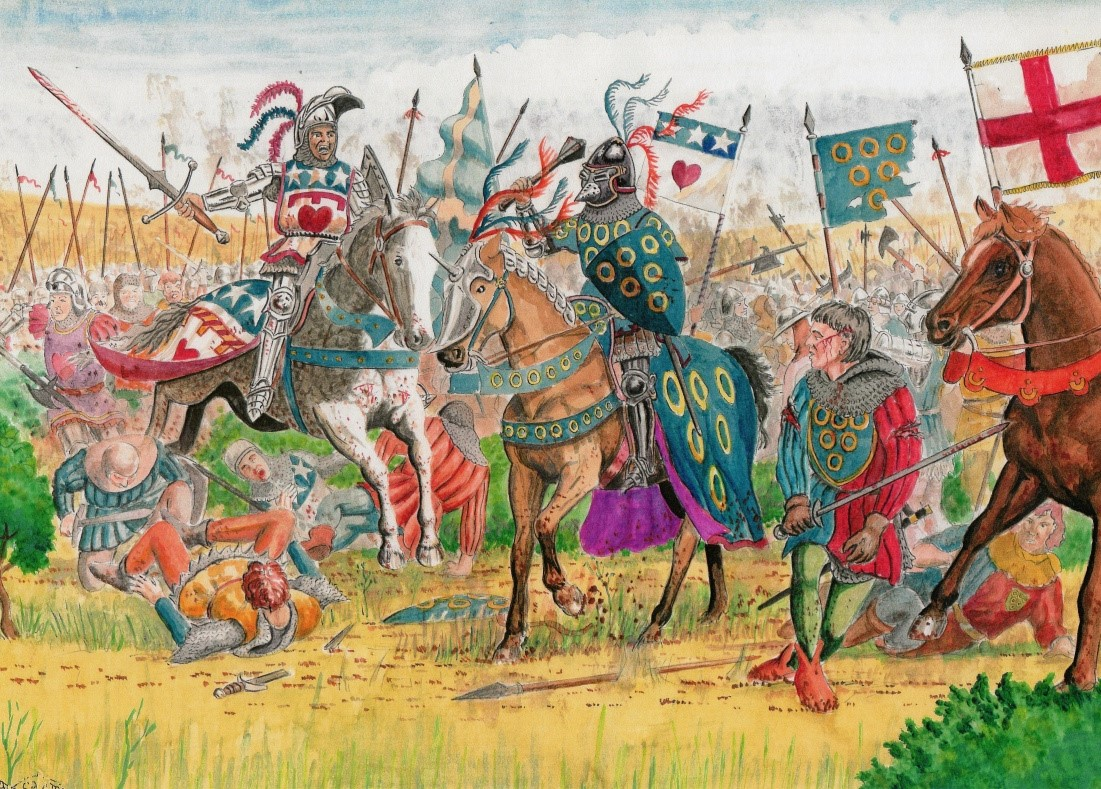
- The 1378 Battle of Melrose painted by Andrew Spratt depicting Archibald Douglas (mounted figure on the left) about to kill a cavalry troop in Musgrave's army (middle)
Date	1378
Location	Melrose, Scottish Borders
Result	Scottish victory

Belligerents
Kingdom of Scotland	Kingdom of England

Commanders and leaders
Archibald Douglas	Thomas de Musgrave (POW)

Strength
~500 (reinforced by unknown size)	~10,000

The Battle of Melrose was fought in Melrose, Scotland, in 1378, between England and Scotland. Despite the Scots being outnumbered 1 to 20, they still defeated the English, and even captured their leader.

== Background ==
In 1378, Alexander Ramsay of Dalhousie, a nephew of Archibald Douglas, took Berwick by surprise with 50 men, and was immediately besieged by the town's governor Thomas de Musgrave. Douglas and Lord Lyndsay of the Byres assembled a relief army at Haddington, little more than 500 in number, but marched anyway, hoping to collect more men on the way.

== Battle ==
When Archibald's army approached Berwick, his scouts informed him that the English army around the castle numbered around 10,000, with archers, siege engines, heavy horse and ships blockading the river. Douglas then retreated to Melrose, followed by the English army. Just short of Melrose, Musgrave attacked. Fortunately Archibald's army had now been reinforced. During the ensuing Battle of Melrose, Musgrave was unhorsed and forced to yield for ransom. With Musgrave and other leaders captured, the remaining English not already slain fled back to Berwick with news of their defeat.

The English complained that "the Earl of March and Douglas, and the latter's cousin Sir Archibald,....are harassing the English Borderers by imprisonment, ransoms, and otherwise.
