= Halidon Hill =

Hill near Berwick-upon-Tweed, Northumberland, United Kingdom

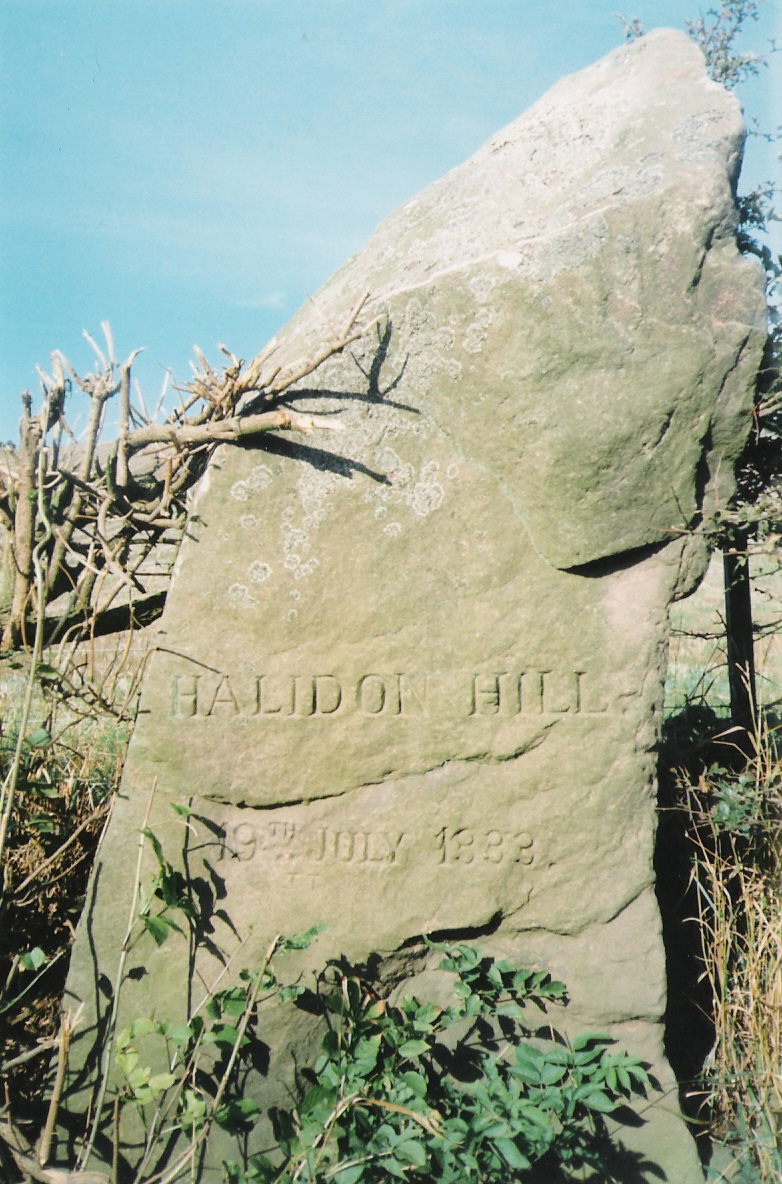
- Battle of Halidon Hill cairn

Highest point
- Coordinates: 55°47′13″N 02°03′05″W

Geography
- Location within Northumberland
- Location: Northumberland, England
- OS grid: NT968548

Halidon Hill is a summit, about 2 miles (3 km) west of the centre of Berwick-upon-Tweed, on the border of England and Scotland. It reaches 600 feet (180 m) high. The name of the hill indicates that it once had a fortification on its top. It is bounded by the A6105 road on its south and the A1 road to the northeast.

== History ==
At the Battle of Halidon Hill in 1333, Edward III of England used longbowmen on the heights of the hill to defeat the Scottish army led by Archibald the "Tyneman" Douglas, Regent of Scotland.

An English army camped at Halidon Hill on 27 March 1560. The soldiers were sent into Scotland to help at the siege of Leith during the Scottish Reformation. Mary, Queen of Scots, came to Halidon Hill to view Berwick on 15 November 1566 and met John Forster, Marshal of Berwick. Unfortunately, Forster's horse kicked her and she had to rest for two days at Dunglass on her way to Edinburgh.

When James VI visited Halidon Hill on 27 April 1588 there was a cannon salute and he spoke with members of the garrison. He gave the English commanding officers a gift of 100 gold crowns and to the porters (officers of lesser rank) 40 crowns described as "drinksilver".

In April 1595, James VI and Anne of Denmark discussed plans to come on a progress towards Berwick including a visit to Halidon Hill which overlooked the town and its fortifications. The governor of Berwick, Henry Carey, 1st Baron Hunsdon wondered if the town should give them a cannon salute. On this occasion, James VI vetoed the travel plans. James and Anne planned a similar trip, from Spott, in April 1597.

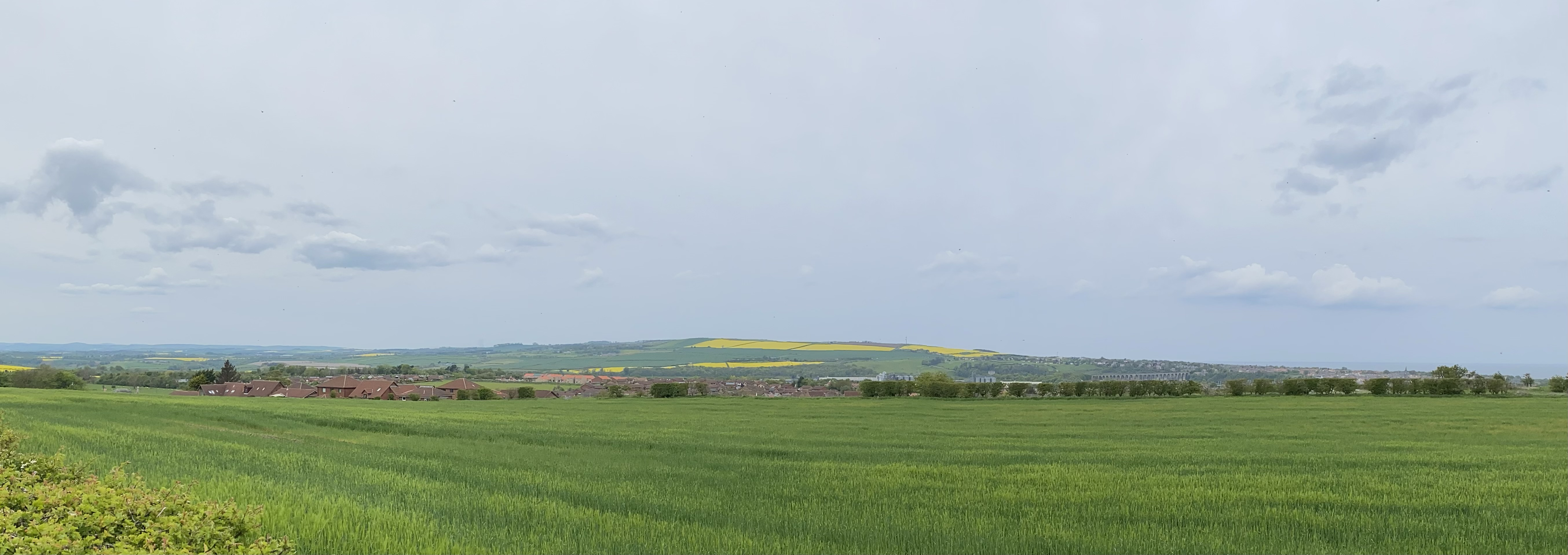
Panoramic view of Halidon Hill (centre) in 2023. The town of Berwick Upon Tweed is to east, on North Sea coast.

== See also ==
- List of places in the Scottish Borders
- List of places in Scotland
- List of battles (alphabetical)
- Anglo-Scottish Wars
