= Battle of Skaithmuir =

Skirmish of the First War of Scottish Independence

Coordinates: 55.686°N 2.253°W

- Part of the First War of Scottish Independence
Date	1316
Location	Skaithmuir, near Coldstream, Scotland
Result	Scottish victory

Belligerents
Kingdom of Scotland	Kingdom of England

Commanders and leaders
James Douglas	Edmond de Caillou †

Strength
Unknown	Unknown, but significantly more than the Scots

Casualties and losses
Relatively low	High

The Battle of Skaithmuir was a skirmish of the First War of Scottish Independence. It took place near Coldstream, on the Anglo-Scottish border, in February 1316. The skirmish was fought between the Scottish captain Sir James Douglas, and an English raiding party from Berwick upon Tweed. The English were having difficulty getting supplies to Berwick after the Scots had won back the surrounding territory and the garrison was facing starvation. Under Edmond Caillou, a Gascon knight, about 80 men set out from Berwick to raid Teviotdale for cattle. Douglas, having been informed that there were fewer in the raiding party, set out to cut them off. Douglas won, and Caillou was killed. Douglas later called it the most difficult fight of his long career. The Scots under Douglas and Thomas Randolph went on to capture Berwick in April 1318.

== Bibliography ==
- Calendar of Documents relating to Scotland, ed. Bain, J. Vol III, AD 1307–1357. Edinburgh 1887.
- Davis, I.M., The Black Douglas. London 1974.
- Barbour, J., The Brus ed.Mackenzie, W.M. London 1909.
- Fraser, Sir William, The Douglas Book IV vols. Edinburgh 1885.
- Haines, R.M, King Edward II: Edward of Caernarfon, his life, his reign, and its aftermath-1284-1330. McGill-Queens Univ. Press. 2003.
- Maxwell, Sir Herbert, History of the House of Douglas II vols. London 1902
- Michel, F.X.,Les Écossais en France, les Français en ÉcosseII vols. London 1862. (in French)
- Ross, D.R., James the Good-The Black Douglas. Glasgow 2008.
