= Alexander Seton (governor of Berwick) =

Governor of Berwick

Sir Alexander Seton
- Lord Seton
- Spouse: Christian Cheyne

Sir Alexander Seton (or Alexander de Seton; fl. 1311 – c. 1348) was the governor (sometimes referred to as the Keeper or the Captain) of Berwick.

== Life ==
In August 1309, Sir Alexander Seton, knight, opposed Robert de Bruce, as evidenced by a Charter of Donation from John de Strachan, made at Perth (Lang, 927). Perth was an English supply base and garrison town until 1313. Moreover, the Strachan Family (likely his cousins) were also known to have been close allies of John Comyn, Earl of Buchan, and were staunch supporters of the Comyn Cause.

Alexander Seton took part in Edward Bruce's 1315 campaign in Ireland. He signed the Declaration of Arbroath of 1320 asserting the independence of Scotland.

== Berwick-upon-Tweed ==
In 1327 he was said to be appointed keeper of Berwick-upon-Tweed. For how long is unclear as on 21 March King Robert applied for a Safe-Conduct for him to go to England for negotiations.

In 1331 Sir Robert de Lawedre of The Bass was Keeper of the Scottish Marches and Custodian of the Castle of Berwick-upon-Tweed, receiving a fee attributed to those positions, at Pentecost, of £33.6s.8p. He is also described as Sheriff of Berwick, for which he received a further payment. He was still holding those positions the following year as mentioned by the historian of the town.

In March 1333 Edward Balliol, son and heir of King John Balliol, and Henry Beaumont, 4th Earl of Buchan, along with their supporters and those of the late John Comyn invaded Scotland with the tacit support of Edward III of England. The army advanced quickly towards Berwick, which was placed under siege.

In 1333 Alexander Seton was again governor of the town of Berwick, while Patrick de Dunbar, Earl of March was entrusted with the defence of the castle. After a long siege, an agreement to surrender Berwick within a certain time unless it has been relieved was obtained. Alexander's son, Thomas Seton, was given as a hostage.

A small party of Scots led by Sir William Keith managed with some difficulty to make their way across the charred ruins of the old bridge to the northern bank of the Tweed and were able to force their way through to the walled town, which sat below the castle. Guardian of the Realm Archibald Douglas, who had crossed the Border into England in order to draw Edward, viewed this as a technical relief and sent messages to Edward calling on him to depart.

King Edward III of England viewed it differently, and as the town had not surrendered by the agreed date, saw this as a breach of the agreement and hanged Thomas Seton within sight of the besieged and his parents. Another treaty was agreed to so as to protect the other hostages. Berwick was eventually surrendered after the defeat of the Scots at the Battle of Halidon Hill on 19 July 1333. In this month, in a double tragedy, Seton's son William drowned in an attack upon the English fleet at Berwick, again in sight of his father.

Alexander was present in Edward Balliol's parliament on 10 February 1334 and witnessed the (temporary) cession of Berwick to the English. He had a Safe-conduct to go to England, 15 October 1337, and in August 1340 he was one of the hostages for John, Earl of Moray.

He entered the Order of Knights of the Hospital of Saint John of Jerusalem, after 1341 and was styled Master of Torphichen in 1345 after being appointed to the charge of the Order of Knights of the Hospital of Saint John of Jerusalem House of Torphichen by the Hélion de Villeneuve, Grand Master at Rhodes. Alexander obtained a temporary dispensation granted on 6 February 1346–47 by Pope Clement VI, permitting Alexander to choose a confessor. As a Knight of the Order he was granted safe-conduct dated 12 August 1348 to enable him to visit King David II of Scotland, who was imprisoned within the Tower of London. Alexander seems to have died shortly afterwards.

== Marriage and issue ==
He married Christian, daughter of Francis le Cheyne of Straloch; they had issue:

- Thomas, executed outside Berwick in 1333 during the siege.
- William, drowned July 1333 in an attack upon the English fleet at Berwick, during the siege.
- Margaret, the heiress, married Alan de Wyntoun, and had issue. Their children took the surname of Seton.
- Alexander, killed opposing the landing of Edward Balliol at Kinghorn, 6 August 1332.
- John of Parbroath, died c. 1327.
