= List of battles between England and Scotland =

The Kingdom of England and the Kingdom of Scotland fought dozens of battles with each other. They fought typically over land, and the Anglo-Scottish border frequently changed as a result. Prior to the establishment of the two kingdoms, in the 10th and 9th centuries, their predecessors, the Northumbrians, Picts and Dal Riatans, also fought a number of battles. Conflicts predating Anglo-Saxon settlement in Britain such as those between Celtic Britons and Picts are not covered in this article. Major conflicts between the two parties include the Wars of Scottish Independence (1296–1357), and the Rough Wooing (1544–1551), as well as numerous smaller campaigns and individual confrontations. In 1603, England and Scotland were joined in a "personal union" when King James VI of Scotland succeeded to the throne of England as King James I. War between the two states largely ceased, although the Wars of the Three Kingdoms in the 17th century, and the Jacobite risings of the 18th century, are sometimes characterised as Anglo-Scottish conflicts.

This list is arranged in chronological order.

== Battles between Northumbria and the Picts/Dal Riatans ==
Date	Name	Notes
596	Battle of Raith	Battle where the Angles defeated an alliance of Scots, Britons and Picts under King Áedán mac Gabráin of Dál Riata. Actually a confusion with the Battle of Catraeth.
603	Battle of Degsastan	Battle between the English Kingdom of Bernicia and the kingdom of Dál Riata under King Áedán mac Gabráin.
671	Battle of Two Rivers	Ecgfrith of the Northumbrians defeated the Picts.
685	Battle of Dunnichen	King Bridei Mac Bili defeats the Northumbrians. Ending Northumbrian hegemony in northern Britain.

== Early battles between England and Scotland ==
Date	Name	Notes
937	Battle of Brunanburh	English victory over the combined armies of the kingdoms of Scotland, Dublin and Strathclyde.
1016/1018	Battle of Carham	Victory for Malcolm II over Huctred, son of Waldef. Believed to have won Lothian for Scotland.
1054	Battle of Dunsinane	
1093	Battle of Alnwick	While besieging Alnwick Malcolm III was killed by knights led by Robert de Mowbray and his army fled.
1138	Battle of Clitheroe	English army was routed by William fitz Duncan.
1138	Battle of the Standard	David I routed by an army led by William of Aumale. Also known as the Battle of Northallerton.
1174	Battle of Alnwick	William I of Scotland was captured by a small English force led by Ranulf de Glanvill.

== First War of Scottish Independence ==
Date	Name	Notes
1296	Capture of Berwick	English under Robert de Clifford take Berwick-upon-Tweed.
1296	Battle of Dunbar	John de Warenne defeats John Balliol, paving the way for most of Scotland to fall to Edward I.
1297	Raid of Scone	William Wallace joined forces with William Douglas the Hardy and led a successful raid on Scone, Scotland.
1297	Battle of Stirling Bridge	William Wallace & Andrew de Moray defeated the English forces of John de Warenne and Hugh de Cressingham near Stirling on the River Forth.
1298	Battle of Falkirk	Led by Edward I the English army defeated the Scots led by William Wallace. Shortly after the battle Wallace resigned as Guardian of Scotland
1300	Battle on the Cree	English victory
1303	Battle of Roslin	A Scottish force under John III Comyn defeated the English under Sir John Segrave in a series of encounters.
1304	Action at Happrew	William Wallace and Sir Simon Fraser were defeated by an army of English knights led by Sir John Segrave.
1304	Siege of Stirling Castle	The English under Edward I capture Stirling Castle.
1304	Action at Earnside	Details are scarce, although it is the last action known to be fought by William Wallace.
1306	Battle of Methven	Robert the Bruce routed at Methven by Aymer de Valence.
1307	Battle of Glen Trool	Robert the Bruce drives back an English raiding party in a minor skirmish.
1307	Battle of Loch Ryan	Rebel Scots win a significant victory against the royalist army and their Irish allies.
1307	Battle of Loudoun Hill	Robert the Bruce's first major victory over the English.

- Siege of Roxburgh Castle (1314)
- Battle of Bannockburn (1314)
- Battle of Connor (1315)
- Siege of Carlisle (1315)
- Battle of Kells (1315)
- Battle of Skaithmuir (1316)
- Battle of Skerries (1316)
- Battle of Faughart (1318)
- Capture of Berwick (1318)
- Battle of Myton (1319)
- Battle of Boroughbridge (1322)
- Battle of Old Byland (1322)
- Battle of Stanhope Park (1327)

== Second War of Scottish Independence ==
- Battle of Wester Kinghorn (1332)
- Battle of Dupplin Moor (1332)
- Battle of Annan (1332)
- Battle of Dornock (1333)
- Battle of Halidon Hill (1333)
- Battle of Boroughmuir (1335)
- Battle of Culblean (1335)
- Battle of Neville's Cross (1346)
- Battle of Nesbit Moor (1355)
- Sieges of Berwick (1355 and 1356)

== Border Wars ==
- Battle of Duns (1372)
- Battle of Otterburn (1388)
- Battle of Fulhope Law (1400)
- Battle of Nesbit Moor (1402)
- Battle of Humbleton Hill (1402)
- Battle of Yeavering (1415)
- Battle of Piperdean (1435)
- Battle of Sark (1448)

== Anglo-Scottish Wars ==
- Capture of Roxburgh (1460)
- Capture of Berwick (1482)
- Battle of Lochmaben Fair (1485)
- Battle of Flodden (1513)
- Battle of Hornshole (1514)
- Battle of Haddon Rig (1542)
- Battle of Solway Moss (1542)

== Rough Wooing ==
- Burning of Edinburgh (1544)
- Battle of Ancrum Moor (1545)
- Battle of Pinkie (1547)
- Broughty Castle (1547–1550)
- Sieges of Haddington (1548–1549)

== Reformation ==
- Siege of Leith (1560)

== Border skirmishes ==
- Raid of the Redeswire (1575)

== Glorious Revolution ==
• Siege of Derry

• Battle of Newtownbutler

• Battle of the Boyne

• Battle of Aughrim

== Wars of the Three Kingdoms ==
- Battle of Newburn (1640)
- Battle of Dunbar (1650)
- Battle of Hieton (1650)
- Battle of Inverkeithing (1651)
- Siege of Dundee (1651)
- Battle of Warrington Bridge (1651)
- Battle of Worcester (1651)
