= Outline of the Wars of Scottish Independence =

Overview of and topical guide to the Wars of Scottish Independence

The following outline is provided as an overview of and topical guide to the Wars of Scottish Independence:

Wars of Scottish Independence – A series of military campaigns fought from 1296–1357 by the Kingdom of Scotland to maintain their nation's independence from the Kingdom of England.

== Background ==
The following events can be seen as leading to the Wars of Scottish Independence:

- Death of Alexander III of Scotland - 19 March 1286
- Death of Margaret, Maid of Norway - September 1290 - left no clear heir to the throne of Scotland.
- Competitors for the Crown of Scotland - 13 individuals claiming the throne of Scotland. Edward I of England was asked to conduct the court which choose the next king.

== Participants ==
Combatants of the following nations and entities were involved in the Wars of Scottish Independence:

- Kingdom of England
- Kingdom of Scotland
- Lordship of Ireland
- Kingdom of France

== Main conflicts and campaigns ==
The Wars of Scottish Independence consisted of the following conflicts:

- First War of Scottish Independence - 1296–1328
  - English invasion of Scotland (1296)
  - Bruce campaign in Ireland - 1315–1318
- Second War of Scottish Independence - 1332–1357

== Notable agreements ==
The following agreements all had a bearing on the conduct of the Wars of Scottish Independence:

- Ragman Rolls - Series of agreements whereby the Scottish nobles subscribed to the allegiance of Edward I of England. Signed in 1291, 1292 and 1296.
- Auld Alliance - Agreement made in 1295 between the Kingdom of Scotland and the Kingdom of France against the Kingdom of England.
- Declaration of Arbroath - Letter sent to Pope John XXII in 1320 asserting Scotland's independence.
- Treaty of Edinburgh–Northampton - 1328 treaty formally ending the First War of Scottish Independence.
- Treaty of Berwick (1357) - Formally ended the Second War of Scottish Independence.

== Notable individuals ==
=== Leaders in Scotland ===
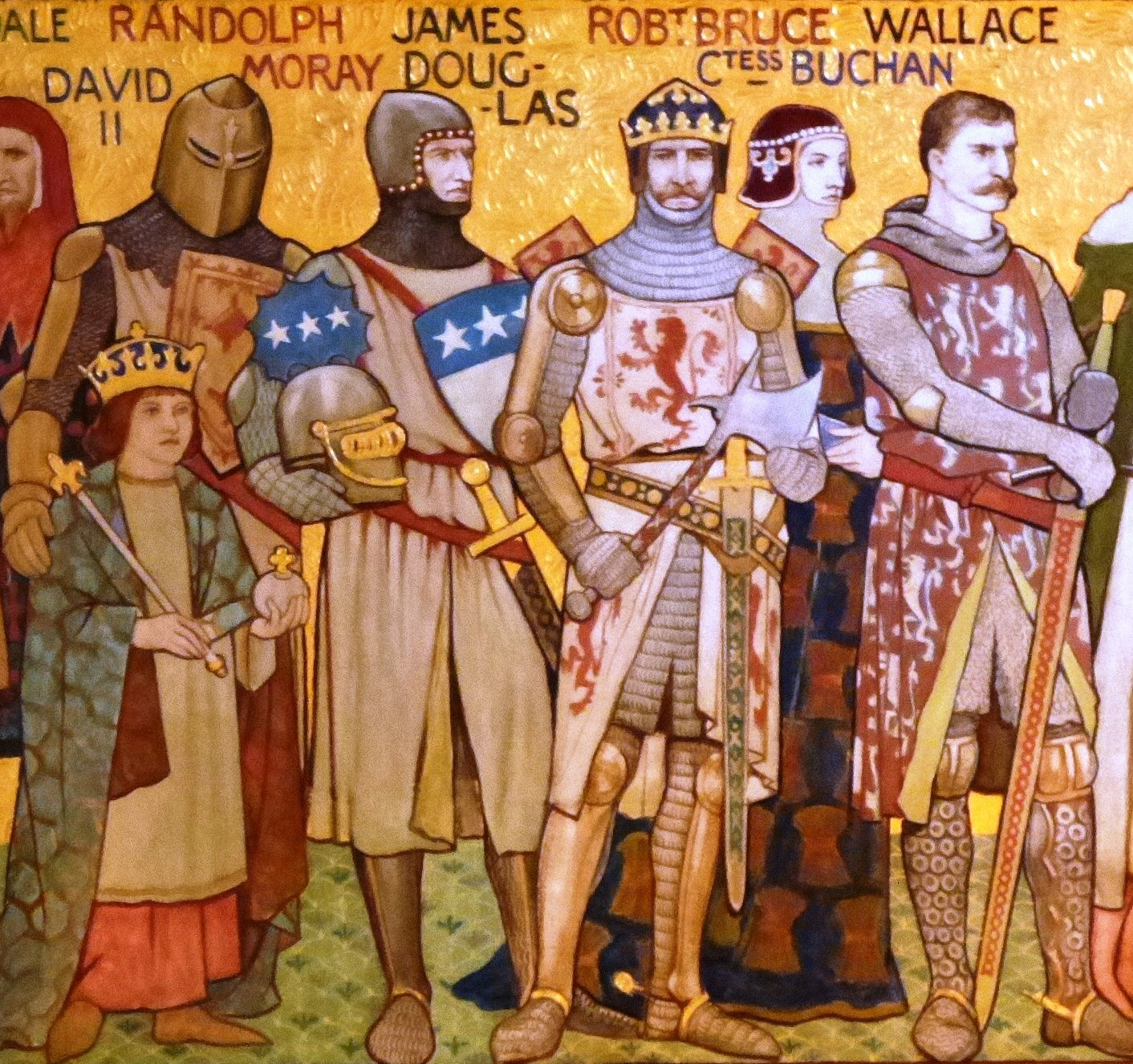
Notable figures in the first Scottish War of Independence

==== Kings ====
- John Balliol - 1292–1296
- Robert the Bruce - 1306–1329
- David II of Scotland - 1329–1371

==== Guardians ====
===== Interregnum period =====
The following people all served as the Guardian of Scotland, either solely or jointly during the interregnum of 1296–1306:

- William Wallace - 1297–1298
- Andrew Moray - 1297–1298
- Robert the Bruce - 1298–1300
- John Comyn III of Badenoch - 1298–1304
- William de Lamberton - 1299–1301
- Ingram de Umfraville - 1300–1301
- John de Soules - 1301–1304

===== Minority of David II =====
The following people all served as the Guardian of Scotland, during the minority of David II of Scotland:

- Thomas Randolph, 1st Earl of Moray - 1329–1332
- Domhnall II, Earl of Mar - 1332
- Andrew Murray - 1332, 1335–1338
- Robert II of Scotland - 1334–1335, 1338–1341. Would serve again when David II was captured by the English from 1347–1354.

=== Leaders in England ===
==== Kings ====
- Edward I of England - 1272–1307
- Edward II of England - 1307–1327
- Edward III of England - 1327–1377

==== Other leaders ====
- Edward Balliol - Claimant to the Scottish throne. Would claim to rule from 1332–1356.

== See also ==
- Anglo-Scottish Wars
- List of battles between Scotland and England
