= Wars of Scottish Independence =

War of national liberation between Scotland and England

The Scottish wars (1296–1357) were two extended military conflicts in which the Kingdom of England attempted to establish full control over the Kingdom of Scotland. In spite of significant temporary successes, the English efforts in both wars ultimately failed due to Scottish resistance and Scotland remained an independent country. The wars were part of a great crisis for Scotland, and the period became one of the most defining times in its history.

The First War (1296–1328) began with the English invasion of Scotland and ended with the signing of the Treaty of Edinburgh–Northampton. The Second War (1332–1357) began with the English-supported invasion by Edward Balliol and the "Disinherited" and ended with the signing of the Treaty of Berwick. Notable figures during the Wars of Scottish Independence included several of the Kings of Scotland such as Alexander III of Scotland, John Balliol, Robert the Bruce and David II of Scotland, with other prominent figures such as William Wallace who served as Guardian of Scotland from 1297–1298. Key figures on the English side include monarchs Edward I, Edward II and Edward III, as well as the contested King of Scotland, Edward Balliol.

The wars were important for other reasons, such as the emergence of the longbow as a key weapon in medieval warfare.

== The First War of Independence: 1296–1328 ==
=== Background ===
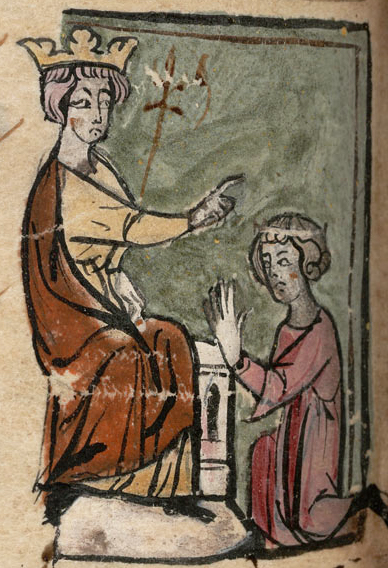
Edward I and his son, Edward, Prince of Wales

King Alexander III of Scotland died in 1286, leaving his three-year-old granddaughter Margaret, Maid of Norway, as his heir. In 1290, the Guardians of Scotland signed the Treaty of Birgham agreeing to the marriage of the Maid of Norway and Edward of Caernarvon, the son of Edward I. This marriage would not create a union between Scotland and England because the Scots insisted that the Treaty declare that Scotland was separate and divided from England and that its rights, laws, liberties and customs were wholly and inviolably preserved for all time.

However, Margaret, travelling to her new kingdom, died shortly after landing in the Orkney Islands around 26 September 1290. After her death, there were 13 rivals for succession. The two leading competitors for the Scottish crown were Robert de Brus, 5th Lord of Annandale (grandfather of the future King Robert the Bruce) and John Balliol, Lord of Galloway. Fearing civil war between the Bruce and Balliol families and supporters, the Guardians of Scotland wrote to Edward I of England, asking him to come north and arbitrate between the claimants in order to avoid civil war.

Edward agreed to meet the guardians at Norham in 1291. Before the process got underway Edward insisted that he be recognised as Lord Paramount of Scotland. When they refused, he gave the claimants three weeks to agree to his terms, knowing that by then his armies would have arrived and the Scots would have no choice. Edward's ploy worked, and the claimants to the crown were forced to acknowledge Edward as their Lord Paramount and accept his arbitration. Their decision was influenced in part by the fact that most of the claimants had large estates in England and, therefore, would have lost them if they had defied the English king. However, many involved were churchmen such as Bishop Wishart for whom such mitigation cannot be claimed.

On 11 June, acting as the Lord Paramount of Scotland, Edward I ordered that every Scottish royal castle be placed temporarily under his control and every Scottish official resign his office and be re-appointed by him. Two days later, in Upsettlington, the Guardians of the Realm and the leading Scottish nobles gathered to swear allegiance to King Edward I as Lord Paramount. All Scots were also required to pay homage to Edward I, either in person or at one of the designated centres by 27 July 1291.

There were 13 meetings from May to August 1291 at Berwick, where the claimants to the crown pleaded their cases before Edward, in what came to be known as the "Great Cause". The claims of most of the competitors were rejected, leaving only the men who could prove direct descent from David I: Balliol; Bruce; Floris V, Count of Holland; and John de Hastings of Abergavenny, 2nd Baron Hastings.

On 3 August, Edward asked Balliol and Bruce to choose 40 arbiters each, while he chose 24, to decide the case. On 12 August, he signed a writ that required the collection of all documents that might concern the competitors' rights or his own title to the superiority of Scotland, which was accordingly executed. (Note: The writ required the collection of "all the charters instruments rolls and writs whatsoever that might concern the rights of the competitors, or his own pretended title to the superiority of Scotland, to be carried off and placed where he should appoint; and these to be put into the hands of five persons, two Scots and three English; and these last to act by themselves, if the two first happened to be hindered".) Balliol was named king by a majority on 17 November 1292 and on 30 November he was crowned King of Scots at Scone Abbey. On 26 December, at Newcastle upon Tyne, King John swore homage to Edward I for the Kingdom of Scotland. Edward soon made it clear that he regarded the country as a vassal state. Balliol, undermined by members of the Bruce faction, struggled to resist, and the Scots resented Edward's demands. In 1294, Edward summoned John Balliol to appear before him, and then ordered that he had until 1 September 1294 to provide Scottish troops and funds for his invasion of France.

On his return to Scotland, John held a meeting with his council and after a few days of heated debate, plans were made to defy the orders of Edward I. A few weeks later a Scottish parliament was hastily convened and 12 members of a war council (four earls, barons, and bishops, respectively) were selected to advise King John.

Emissaries were immediately dispatched to inform King Philip IV of France of the intentions of the English. They also negotiated a treaty by which the Scots would invade England if the English invaded France, and in return the French would support the Scots. The treaty would be sealed by the arranged marriage of John's son Edward and Philip's niece Joan. Another treaty with King Eric II of Norway was hammered out, in which for the sum of 50,000 groats he would supply 100 ships for four months of the year, so long as hostilities between France and England continued. Although Norway never acted, the Franco-Scottish alliance, later known as the Auld Alliance, was renewed frequently until 1560.

It was not until 1295 that Edward I became aware of the secret Franco-Scottish negotiations. In early October, he began to strengthen his northern defences against a possible invasion. It was at this point that Robert Bruce, 6th Lord of Annandale (father of the future King Robert the Bruce) was appointed by Edward as the governor of Carlisle Castle. Edward also ordered John Balliol to relinquish control of the castles and burghs of Berwick, Jedburgh and Roxburgh. In December, more than 200 of Edward's tenants in Newcastle were summoned to form a militia by March 1296 and in February, a fleet sailed north to meet his land forces in Newcastle.

The movement of English forces along the Anglo-Scottish border did not go unnoticed. In response, King John Balliol summoned all able-bodied Scotsmen to bear arms and gather at Caddonlee by 11 March. Several Scottish nobles chose to ignore the summons, including Robert Bruce, Earl of Carrick, whose Carrick estates had been seized by John Balliol and reassigned to John 'The Red' Comyn. Robert Bruce had become Earl of Carrick at the resignation of his father earlier that year.

=== Beginning of the war: 1296–1306 ===
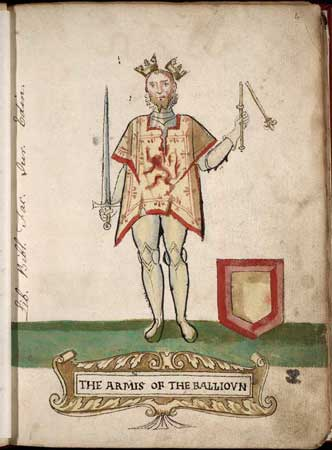
The dethroned King John, whom a Scottish chronicler dubbed 'toom tabard' ('empty coat')

The First War of Scottish Independence can be loosely divided into four phases: the initial English invasion and success in 1296; the campaigns led by William Wallace, Andrew de Moray and various Scottish Guardians from 1297 until John Comyn (the "Red Comyn") negotiated for the general Scottish submission in February 1304; the renewed campaigns led by Robert the Bruce following his killing of the Red Comyn in Dumfries in 1306 to his and the Scottish victory at Bannockburn in 1314; and a final phase of Scottish diplomatic initiatives and military campaigns in Scotland, Ireland and Northern England from 1314 until the Treaty of Edinburgh–Northampton in 1328.

The war began in earnest with Edward I's brutal sacking of Berwick in March 1296, followed by the Scottish defeat at the Battle of Dunbar and the abdication of John Balliol in July. The English invasion campaign had subdued most of the country by August and, after removing the Stone of Destiny from Scone Abbey and transporting it to Westminster Abbey, Edward convened a parliament at Berwick, where the Scottish nobles paid homage to him as King of England.

The revolts which broke out in early 1297, led by William Wallace, Andrew de Moray and other Scottish nobles, forced Edward to send more forces to deal with the Scots, and although they managed to force the nobles to capitulate at Irvine, Wallace and de Moray's continuing campaigns eventually led to the first key Scottish victory, at Stirling Bridge. Moray was fatally wounded in the fighting at Stirling, and died soon after the battle. This was followed by Scottish raids into northern England and the appointment of Wallace as Guardian of Scotland in March 1298. But in July, Edward invaded again, intending to crush Wallace and his followers, and defeated the Scots at Falkirk. Edward failed to subdue Scotland completely before returning to England.

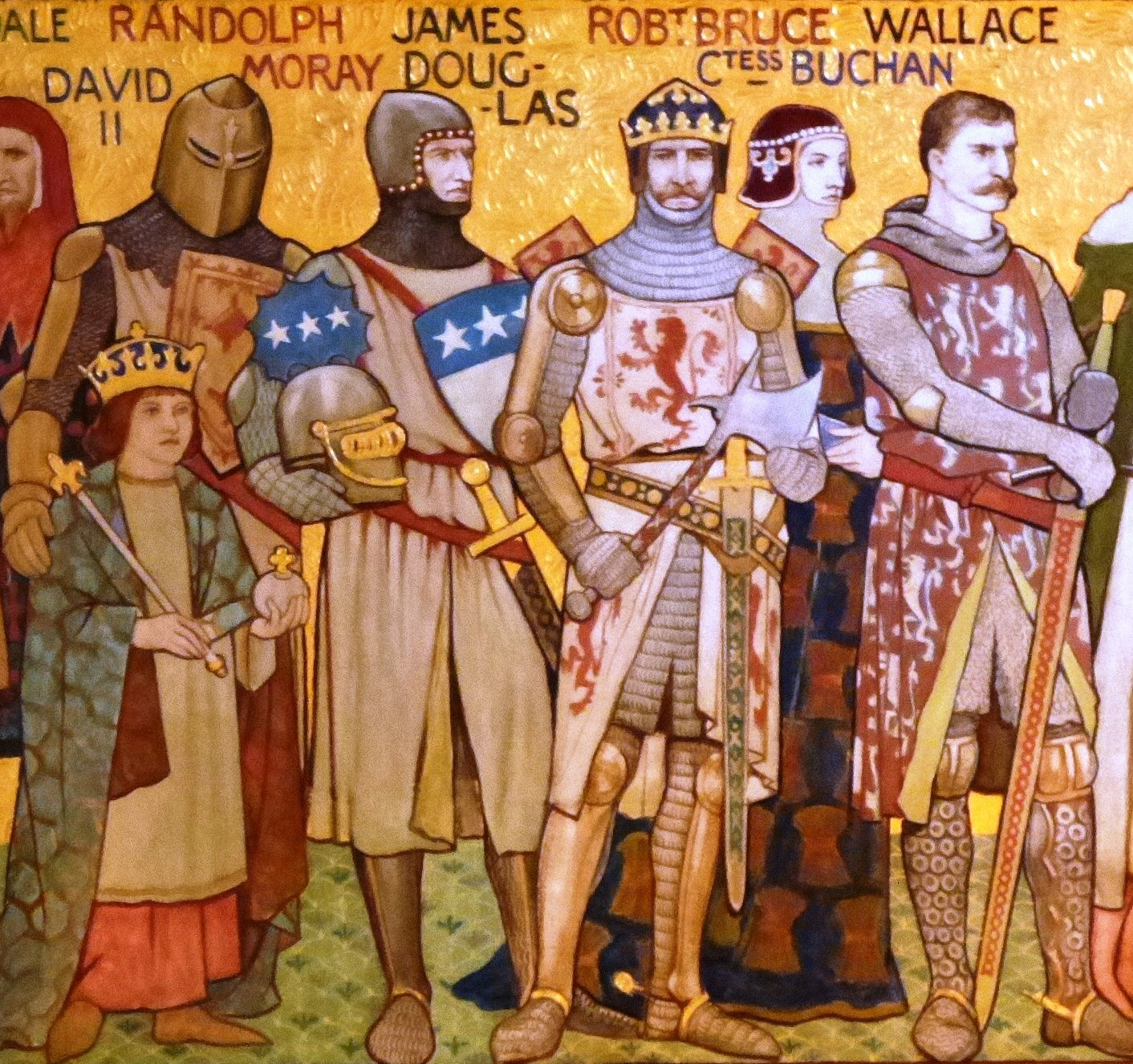
Notable figures from the first War of Independence as depicted by the Victorian artist William Hole

There have been several stories regarding Wallace and what he did after the Battle of Falkirk. It is said by some sources that Wallace travelled to France and fought for the French King against the English during their own ongoing war while Bishop Lamberton of St Andrews, who gave much support to the Scottish cause, went and spoke to the pope. Wallace was succeeded by Robert Bruce and John Comyn as joint guardians, with William de Lamberton, Bishop of St Andrews, being appointed in 1299 as a third, neutral Guardian to try to maintain order between them.

Further campaigns by Edward in 1300 and 1301 led to a truce between the Scots and the English in 1302. After another campaign in 1303/1304, Stirling Castle, the last major Scottish-held stronghold, fell to the English, and in February 1304, negotiations led to most of the remaining nobles paying homage to Edward and to the Scots all but surrendering. At this point, Robert Bruce and William Lamberton may have made a secret bond of alliance, aiming to place Bruce on the Scottish throne and continue the struggle. However, Lamberton came from a family associated with the Balliol-Comyn faction and his ultimate allegiances are unknown.

After the capture and execution of Wallace in 1305, Scotland seemed to have been finally conquered and the revolt calmed for a period.

=== King Robert the Bruce: 1306–1328 ===
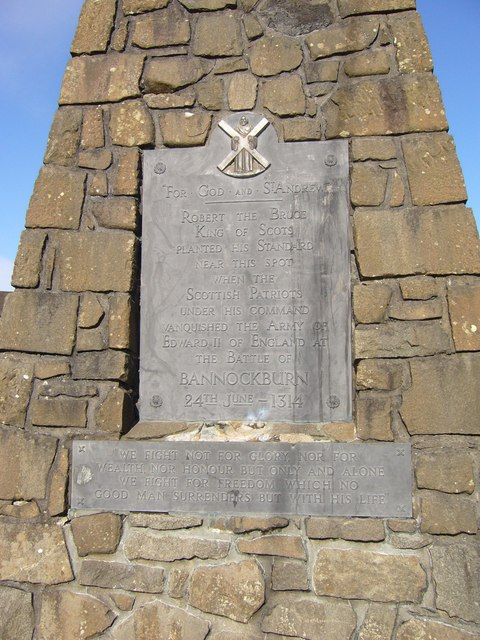
Bannockburn Monument plaque

On 10 February 1306, during a meeting between Bruce and Comyn, the two surviving claimants for the Scottish throne, Bruce quarrelled with and killed John Comyn at Greyfriars Kirk in Dumfries. At this moment the rebellion was sparked again.

Comyn, it seems, had broken an agreement between the two, and informed King Edward of Bruce's plans to be king. The agreement was that one of the two claimants would renounce his claim on the throne of Scotland, but receive lands from the other and support his claim. Comyn appears to have thought to get both the lands and the throne by betraying Bruce to the English. A messenger carrying documents from Comyn to Edward was captured by Bruce and his party, plainly implicating Comyn. Bruce then rallied the Scottish prelates and nobles behind him and had himself crowned King of Scots at Scone less than five weeks after the killing in Dumfries. He then began a new campaign to free his kingdom. After being defeated in the Battle of Methven, he was driven from the Scottish mainland as an outlaw as Edward I declared that his supporters would be given no quarter, and his wife Queen Elizabeth, daughter Marjorie and younger sisters Christina and Mary were captured by the English. Bruce returned to the mainland in 1307. King Robert's forces continued to grow in strength, encouraged in part by the death of Edward I in July 1307. The Battle of Loudoun Hill, the Battle of the Pass of Brander, and the captures of Roxburgh Castle and Edinburgh Castle saw the English continually lose ground in their control of the country. The Battle of Bannockburn in 1314 was a pivotal event in the course of the war, after which the family members of Bruce captive in England were returned. In 1318, the Scots completed the expulsion of the English by retaking the then Scottish city of Berwick-Upon-Tweed in April 1318.

In 1320, the Declaration of Arbroath was sent by a group of Scottish nobles to the Pope affirming Scottish independence from England. Two similar declarations were also sent by the nobles, clergy and Robert I. In 1324, Thomas Randolph, Earl of Moray was sent to meet the Pope in person at his court in Avignon. Randolph successfully persuaded Pope John to recognise Robert as King of Scots, a major diplomatic coup. In 1327, Edward II of England was deposed and killed and his son Edward III of England assumed the throne. Repeated invasions of the north of England by Robert or his war leaders, culminating in the Battle of Stanhope Park, in which the English king was nearly captured, forced Edward III to sign the Treaty of Edinburgh–Northampton on 1 May 1328. This recognised the independence of Scotland and Robert the Bruce as King. To further seal the peace, Robert's son and heir David married the sister of Edward III.

== The Second War of Independence: 1332–1357 ==
After Robert the Bruce's death, King David II was too young to rule, so the guardianship was assumed by Thomas Randolph, Earl of Moray. But Edward III, despite having given his name to the Treaty of Edinburgh-Northampton, was determined to avenge the humiliation by the Scots and he could count on the assistance of Edward Balliol, the son of John Balliol and a claimant to the Scottish throne.

Edward III also had the support of a group of Scottish nobles, led by Balliol and Henry Beaumont, known as the 'Disinherited'. This group of nobles had supported the English in the First War and, after Bannockburn, Robert the Bruce had given them a year to return to his peace. When they refused, he deprived them of their titles and lands, granting them to his allies. When peace was concluded, they received no war reparations. These 'Disinherited' were hungry for their old lands and would prove to be the undoing of the peace.

The Earl of Moray died on 20 July 1332. The Scots nobility gathered at Perth where they elected Domhnall II, Earl of Mar as the new Guardian. Meanwhile, a small band led by Balliol had set sail from the Humber. Consisting of the disinherited noblemen and mercenaries, they were probably no more than a few thousand strong.

Edward III was still formally at peace with David II and his dealings with Balliol were therefore deliberately obscured. He of course knew what was happening and Balliol probably did homage in secret before leaving, but Balliol's desperate scheme must have seemed doomed to failure. Edward therefore refused to allow Balliol to invade Scotland from across the River Tweed. This would have been too open a breach of the treaty. He agreed to turn a blind eye to an invasion by sea, but made it clear that he would disavow them and confiscate all their English lands should Balliol and his friends fail.

The 'Disinherited' landed at Kinghorn in Fife on 6 August. The news of their advance had preceded them, and, as they marched towards Perth, they found their route barred by a large Scottish army, mostly of infantry, under the new Guardian.

At the Battle of Dupplin Moor, Balliol's army, commanded by Henry Beaumont, defeated the larger Scottish force. Beaumont made use of the same tactics that the English would make famous during the Hundred Years' War, with dismounted knights in the centre and archers on the flanks. Caught in the murderous rain of arrows, most of the Scots did not reach the enemy's line. When the slaughter was finally over, the Earl of Mar, Sir Robert Bruce (an illegitimate son of Robert the Bruce), many nobles and around 2,000 Scots had been slain. Edward Balliol then had himself crowned King of Scots, first at Perth, and then again in September at Scone Abbey. Balliol's success surprised Edward III, and fearing that Balliol's invasion would eventually fail leading to a Scots invasion of England, he moved north with his army.

In October, Sir Archibald Douglas, now Guardian of Scotland, made a truce with Balliol, supposedly to let the Scottish Parliament assemble and decide who their true king was. Emboldened by the truce, Balliol dismissed most of his English troops and moved to Annan, on the north shore of the Solway Firth. He issued two public letters, saying that with the help of England he had reclaimed his kingdom, and acknowledged that Scotland had always been a fief of England. He also promised land for Edward III on the border, including Berwick-on-Tweed, and that he would serve Edward for the rest of his life. But in December, Douglas attacked Balliol at Annan in the early hours of the morning. Most of Balliol's men were killed, though he himself managed to escape through a hole in the wall, and fled, naked and on horse, to Carlisle.

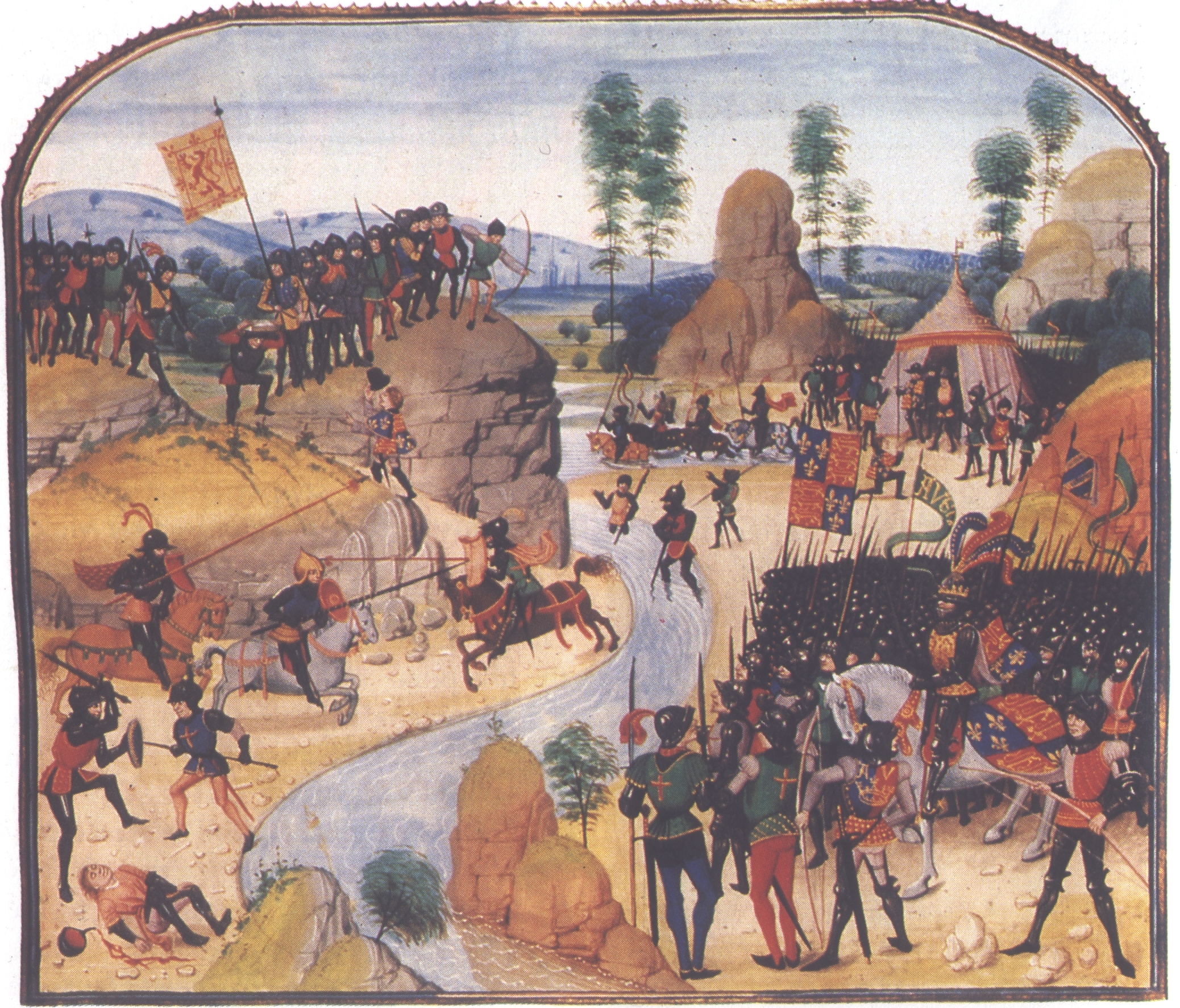
Edward III invades Scotland, from an edition of Froissart's Chronicles

In April 1333, Edward III and Balliol, with a large English army, laid siege to Berwick. Archibald Douglas attempted to relieve the town in July, but was defeated and killed at the Battle of Halidon Hill. David II and his Queen were moved to the safety of Dumbarton Castle, while Berwick surrendered and was annexed by Edward. By now, much of Scotland was under English occupation, with eight of the Scottish lowland counties being ceded to England by Edward Balliol.

At the beginning of 1334, Philip VI of France offered to bring David II and his court to France for asylum, and in May they arrived in France, setting up a court-in-exile at Château Gaillard in Normandy. Philip also decided to derail the Anglo-French peace negotiations then taking place (at the time England and France were engaged in disputes that would lead to the Hundred Years' War), declaring to Edward III that any treaty between France and England must include the exiled King of Scots.

In David's absence, a series of Guardians kept up the struggle. In November, Edward III invaded again, but he accomplished little and retreated in February 1335 due primarily to his failure to bring the Scots to battle. He and Edward Balliol returned again in July with an army of 13,000, and advanced through Scotland, first to Glasgow and then to Perth, where Edward III installed himself while his army looted and destroyed the surrounding countryside. At this time, the Scots followed a plan of avoiding pitched battles, depending instead on minor actions of heavy cavalry – the normal practice of the day. Some Scottish leaders, including the Earl of Atholl, who had returned to Scotland with Edward Balliol in 1332 and 1333, defected to the Bruce party.

Following Edward's return to England, the remaining leaders of the Scots resistance chose Sir Andrew Murray as Guardian. He soon negotiated a truce with Edward until April 1336, during which various French and Papal emissaries attempted to negotiate a peace between the two countries. In January, the Scots drew up a draft treaty agreeing to recognise the elderly and childless Edward Balliol as King, so long as David II would be his heir and David would leave France to live in England. However, David II rejected the peace proposal and any further truces. In May, an English army under Henry of Lancaster invaded, followed in July by another army under King Edward. Together, they ravaged much of the north-east and sacked Elgin and Aberdeen, while a third army ravaged the south-west and the Clyde valley. Prompted by this invasion, Philip VI of France announced that he intended to aid the Scots by every means in his power, and that he had a large fleet and army preparing to invade both England and Scotland. Edward soon returned to England, while the Scots, under Murray, captured and destroyed English strongholds and ravaged the countryside, making it uninhabitable for the English.

Although Edward III invaded again, he was becoming more anxious over the possible French invasion, and by late 1336, the Scots had regained control over virtually all of Scotland and by 1338 the tide had turned. While "Black Agnes", Countess-consort Dunbar and March, continued to resist the English laying siege to Dunbar Castle, hurling defiance and abuse from the walls, Scotland received some breathing space when Edward III claimed the French throne and took his army to Flanders, beginning the Hundred Years' War with France.

In the late autumn of 1335, Strathbogie, dispossessed Earl of Atholl, and Edward III set out to destroy Scottish resistance by dispossessing and killing the Scottish freeholders. Following this, Strathbogie moved to lay siege to Kildrummy Castle, held by Lady Christian Bruce, sister of the late King Robert and wife of the Guardian, Andrew de Moray. Her husband moved his small army quickly to her relief although outnumbered by some five to one. However, many of Strathbogie's men had been impressed and had no loyalty to the English or the usurper, Balliol. Pinned by a flank attack while making a downhill charge, Strathbogie's army broke and Strathbogie refused to surrender and was killed. The Battle of Culblean was the effective end of Balliol's attempt to overthrow the King of Scots.

So, in just nine years, the kingdom so hard won by Robert the Bruce had been shattered and had recovered. Many of her experienced nobles were dead and the economy which had barely begun to recover from the earlier wars was once again in tatters. It was to an impoverished country in need of peace and good government that David II was finally able to return in June 1341.

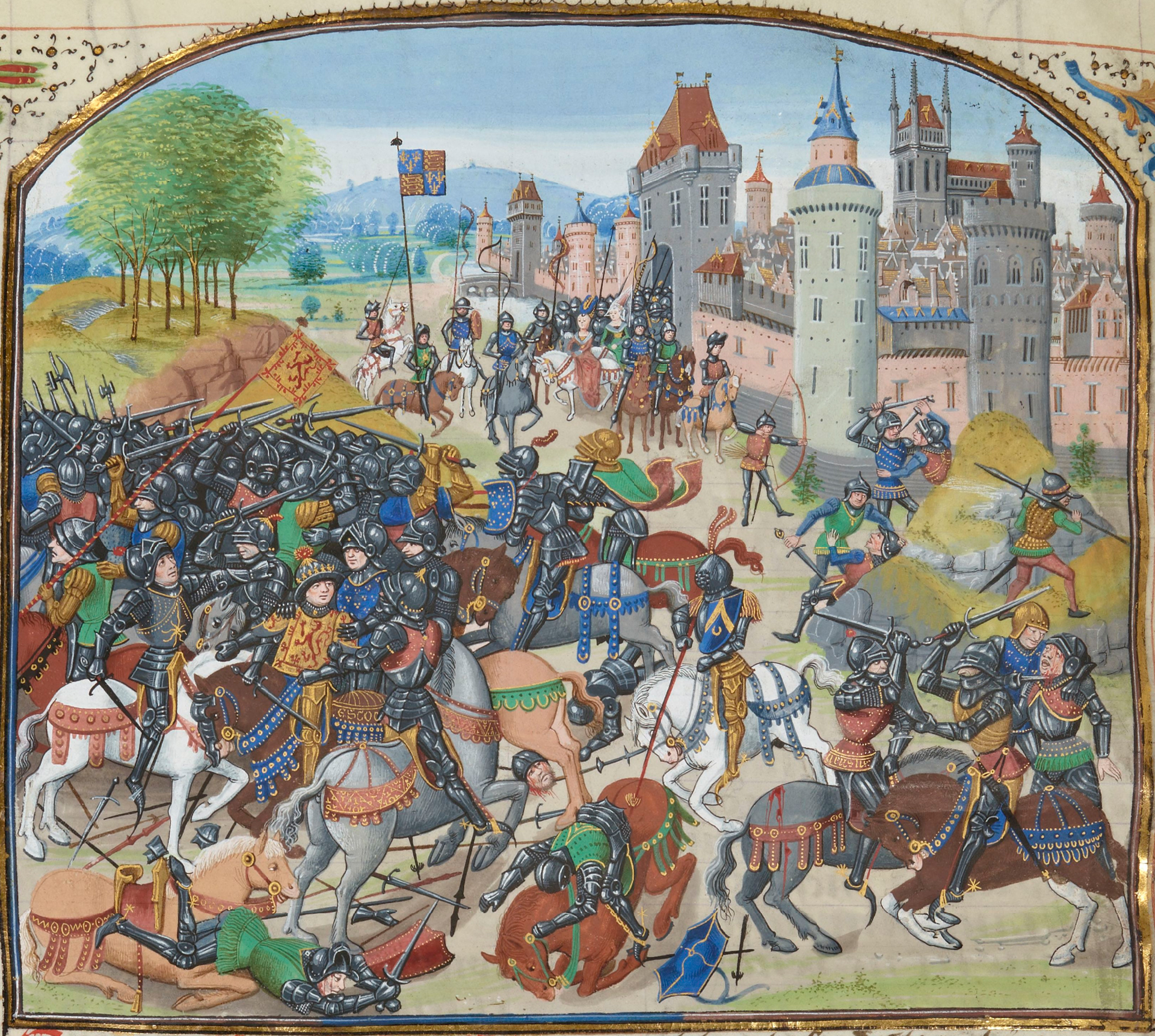
David II (lower left) captured at Neville's Cross, from an edition of Froissart's Chronicles

When David returned, he was determined to live up to the memory of his illustrious father. He ignored truces with England and was determined to stand by his ally Philip VI during the early years of the Hundred Years' War. In 1341 he led a raid into England, forcing Edward III to lead an army north to reinforce the border. In 1346, after more Scottish raids, Philip VI appealed for a counter-invasion of England in order to relieve the English stranglehold on Calais. David gladly accepted and personally led a Scots army southwards with intention of capturing Durham. In reply, an English army moved northwards from Yorkshire to confront the Scots. On 14 October, at the Battle of Neville's Cross, the Scots were defeated. They suffered heavy casualties and David was wounded in the face by two arrows before being captured. He was sufficiently strong however to knock out two teeth from the mouth of his captor. After a period of convalescence, he was imprisoned in the Tower of London, where he was held prisoner for eleven years, during which time Scotland was ruled by his nephew, Robert Stewart, 7th High Steward. Edward Balliol returned to Scotland soon afterwards with a small force, in a final attempt to recover Scotland. He only succeeded in gaining control of some of Galloway, with his power diminishing there until 1355. He finally resigned his claim to the Scottish throne in January 1356 and died childless in 1364.

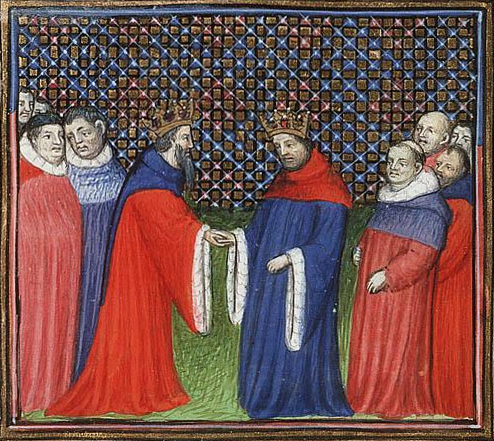
David II pays homage to Edward III

Finally, on 3 October 1357, David was released under the Treaty of Berwick, under which the Scots agreed to pay an enormous ransom of 100,000 merks for him (1 merk was 2/3 of an English pound) payable in 10 years. Heavy taxation was needed to provide funds for the ransom, which was to be paid in instalments, and David alienated his subjects by using the money for his own purposes. The country was in a sorry state then; she had been ravaged by war and also the Black Death. The first instalment of the ransom was paid punctually. The second was late and after that, no more could be paid.

In 1363, David went to London and agreed that should he die childless, the crown would pass to Edward (his brother-in-law) or one of his sons, with the Stone of Destiny being returned for their coronation as King of Scots. However, this seems to have been no more than a rather dishonest attempt to re-negotiate the ransom since David knew perfectly well that Parliament would reject such an arrangement out of hand. The Scots did reject this arrangement, and offered to continue paying the ransom (now increased to 100,000 pounds). A 25-year truce was agreed and in 1369, the treaty of 1365 was cancelled and a new one set up to the Scots' benefit, due to the influence of the war with France. The new terms saw the 44,000 merks already paid deducted from the original 100,000 with the balance due in instalments of 4,000 for the next 14 years.

When Edward died in 1377, there were still 24,000 merks owed, which were never paid. David himself had lost his popularity and the respect of his nobles when he married the widow of a minor laird after the death of his English wife. He himself died in February 1371.

By the end of the campaign, Scotland was independent. It remained thus, until king James VI of Scotland succeeded to the English throne in the 1603 Union of the Crowns, and disputed efforts at political unification culminated in the Treaty of Union of 1707 which created the single Kingdom of Great Britain.

== Major battles and events ==
- Capture of Berwick, 1296
- Battle of Dunbar, 1296
- Battle of Stirling Bridge, 1297
- Battle of Falkirk, 1298
- Battle of Roslin, 1303
- Battle of Happrew, 1304
- Fall of Stirling Castle, 1304
- Battle of Methven, 1306
- Battle of Dalry, 1306
- The Douglas Larder, 1307
- Battle of Turnberry, 1307
- Battle of Glen Trool, 1307
- Battle of Loudoun Hill, 1307
- Battle of Slioch, 1307
- Battle of Inverurie, 1308
- Battle of Pass of Brander, 1308
- Battle of Bannockburn, 1314
- Siege of Carlisle, 1315
- Battle of Connor, 1315
- Battle of Skaithmuir, 1316
- Battle of Skerries, 1316
- Battle of Faughart, 1318
- Capture of Berwick, 1318
- Battle of Myton, 1319
- Declaration of Arbroath, 1320
- Battle of Boroughbridge, 1322
- Battle of Old Byland, 1322
- Treaty of Corbeil, 1326
- Battle of Stanhope Park, 1327
- Treaty of Edinburgh–Northampton, 1328
- Battle of Dupplin Moor, 1332
- Battle of Halidon Hill, 1333
- Battle of Dornock, 1333
- Battle of Boroughmuir, 1335
- Battle of Culblean, 1335
- Battle of Neville's Cross, 1346
- Treaty of Berwick, 1357

== Important figures ==
=== Scotland ===
- King Alexander III
- King John Balliol
- King Robert I the Bruce
- King David II
- Robert Stewart, 7th High Steward – Lieutenant (1346–1357)
- Robert Wishart – Bishop of Glasgow (1272–1317)
- John II Comyn and John III Comyn – Guardians (1298–1301, 1304)
- Andrew de Moray
- William Wallace
- John de Graeme
- John de Soulis – Guardian (1301–1304)
- Domhnall I, Earl of Mar (1276–1301)
- Gartnait, Earl of Mar (1301–1305)
- Edward Bruce
- Thomas Randolph, 1st Earl of Moray – Guardian (1329–1332)
- James Douglas, Lord of Douglas, "the Black" or "the Guid"
- Maol Choluim II, Earl of Lennox (1303–1333)
- Domhnall II, Earl of Mar (1305–1332) Guardian (1332)
- Uilleam II, Earl of Ross (1274–1323)
- Donnchadh IV, Earl of Fife, (1288–1353)
- William Lamberton – Bishop of St Andrews (1298–1328)
- Bernard of Arbroath – Chancellor (1308–1328)
- Andrew Murray – Guardian (1332, 1335–1338)
- Archibald Douglas – Guardian, k. Battle of Halidon Hill 1333
- Agnes Dunbar, Countess-consort of Dunbar/March
- Aodh, Earl of Ross (1323–1333)
- Walter Stewart, 6th High Steward
- Maol Íosa III, Earl of Strathearn (1271–1317)
- Maol Íosa IV, Earl of Strathearn (1317–1329)
- Maol Íosa V, Earl of Strathearn, 1330–1334, Earl of Caithness & Orkney, 1331–1350

=== England ===
- King Edward I
- King Edward II
- King Edward III
- Edward Balliol
- Henry Beaumont, '4th Earl of Buchan'
- Humphrey de Bohun, 4th Earl of Hereford
- John de Bretagne, 1st Earl of Richmond
- Henry of Grosmont, 1st Duke of Lancaster
- David I Strathbogie, Earl of Atholl
- David II Strathbogie, Earl of Atholl
- Gilbert de Umfraville, Earl of Angus
- Aymer de Valence, 2nd Earl of Pembroke
- John de Warenne, 6th Earl of Surrey

=== Other important figures ===
- Philip IV of France
- Philip VI of France
- Pope John XXII

== See also ==
=== Scotland ===
- Anglo-Scottish Wars
- Outline of the Wars of Scottish Independence
- Scottish independence

=== Other ===
- List of Irish uprisings
  - Irish War of Independence
- United Ireland
- Welsh rebellions against English rule
  - Glyndŵr rebellion
- Welsh independence
