= Battle of Kells =

14th-century Irish battle

- Part of the Bruce campaign in Ireland
Date	November 1315
Location	Kells, County Meath 53°43′38″N 6°52′37″W
Result	Scottish victory

Belligerents
Kingdom of Scotland and Gaelic allies	Lordship of Ireland and Gaelic allies

Commanders and leaders
Edward Bruce	Roger Mortimer

Strength
6,000+	Unknown

Casualties and losses
Unknown	Unknown
- Location within Ireland

The Battle of Kells took place between Edward Bruce and Roger Mortimer, 3rd Baron Mortimer.

== Background ==
After his victory at the Battle of Connor Bruce pursued the retreating English army back to Carrickfergus and laid siege to the castle, where they had taken refuge. Around 13 November 1315 Thomas Randolph, 1st Earl of Moray returned from Scotland with 500 experienced soldiers. Leaving a besieging party at Carrickfergus, Bruce travelled to Dundalk to meet Moray, and together led the Scots into County Meath.

Through his marriage to Joan de Geneville, 2nd Baroness Geneville, Roger Mortimer, 3rd Baron Mortimer succeeded to the eastern part of the Lordship of Meath, centred on Trim and its stronghold of Trim Castle. In 1315 Roger resided in Ireland, establishing his lordship against his wife's relatives, the de Lacys of Rathwire.

== Battle ==
Mortimer organized his men on the north border of Meath, to try to keep the Scots away from his own lands. He stocked the castle at Kells, brought in cattle from outlying districts, and improved the town's defenses, so that it might serve as his base of operation.

Leaving a contingent to garrison Nobber, about ten miles north-east of Kells, Bruce went to Kells, possible lured by a supposed offer of fealty from Lord O'Dempsey from Offaly. The two armies met outside Kells, where the Scots began to burn the town. After three hours of fighting, the de Lacy brothers withdrew, leaving Mortimer to fight a much larger force. With his army destroyed and Kells burning, Mortimer managed to escape with a few knights and ride to Dublin.

The Scots then burned Granard and marched for two months unopposed through the midlands, devastating the country.
