= John de Bermingham, 1st Earl of Louth =

Irish knight and nobleman

John de Bermingham, 1st and last Earl of Louth (died 13 June 1329) was an Irish peer. He was the commander of the Anglo-Irish army in the Battle of Faughart, the decisive battle in the Irish Bruce Wars 1315–1318. In this battle, Edward Bruce was killed, and Bermingham had Bruce's severed head 'salted in a chest' and transported to England to be put on display before Edward II. He was briefly Viceroy of Ireland in 1321.

Bermingham was the son of Piers FitzJames MacPhioris de Bermingham and Ela de Odingsells. He was contracted to marry Matilda de Burgh in 1308 but was married to Aveline de Burgh: both were daughters of Richard Óg de Burgh, 2nd Earl of Ulster. In 1312 he was made a knight by the Lord Deputy of Ireland. He was the commander of the English army in Ireland in 1318. He fought in the Battle of Faughart on 14 October 1318 as commander of the forces loyal to King Edward II of England against the army led by Edward Bruce, who had been crowned High King of Ireland. Bruce was killed in the battle. He was created 1st Earl of Louth and granted estates at Ardee on 12 May 1319 as a reward for his services to the Crown in defeating the Scots and given the county of Louth to hold as a jurisdictional Liberty. In 1320 the pope ratified his marriage to Aveline, despite his having been contracted to marry her sister. He had three children with Aveline: their son Richard, Lord Ardee, died in 1322. Their daughter Catherine married Edmund Lacy and the other daughter, Maud, married Sir William Tealing.

In 1320 he led a force into Connacht to fight the O'Connors and the MacKellys. He held the office of Justiciar of Ireland from 21 May 1321 to 18 November 1323. In 1322 he went to England with a force of 300 men-at-arms, 1,000 hobilars and 6,000 foot to aid the King in fighting the Scots. In 1325 he founded a Franciscan priory at Monasteroris, County Offaly.

Bermingham was killed in the Braganstown massacre on 13 June 1329 in a feud between the Anglo-Irish families of Louth, along with some 200 members of his family and household. With his death the Earldom of Louth became extinct and the Liberty of Louth was appropriated by Roger Mortimer, 1st Earl of March. In 1749 the earldom was created again for a collateral descendant, Thomas Bermingham, 1st Earl of Louth, but it became extinct again on his death in 1799.

Peerage of Ireland
| New creation | Earl of Louth; 1319–1329 | Extinct |
