= Anglo-Scottish Wars =

Wars and battles between England and Scotland

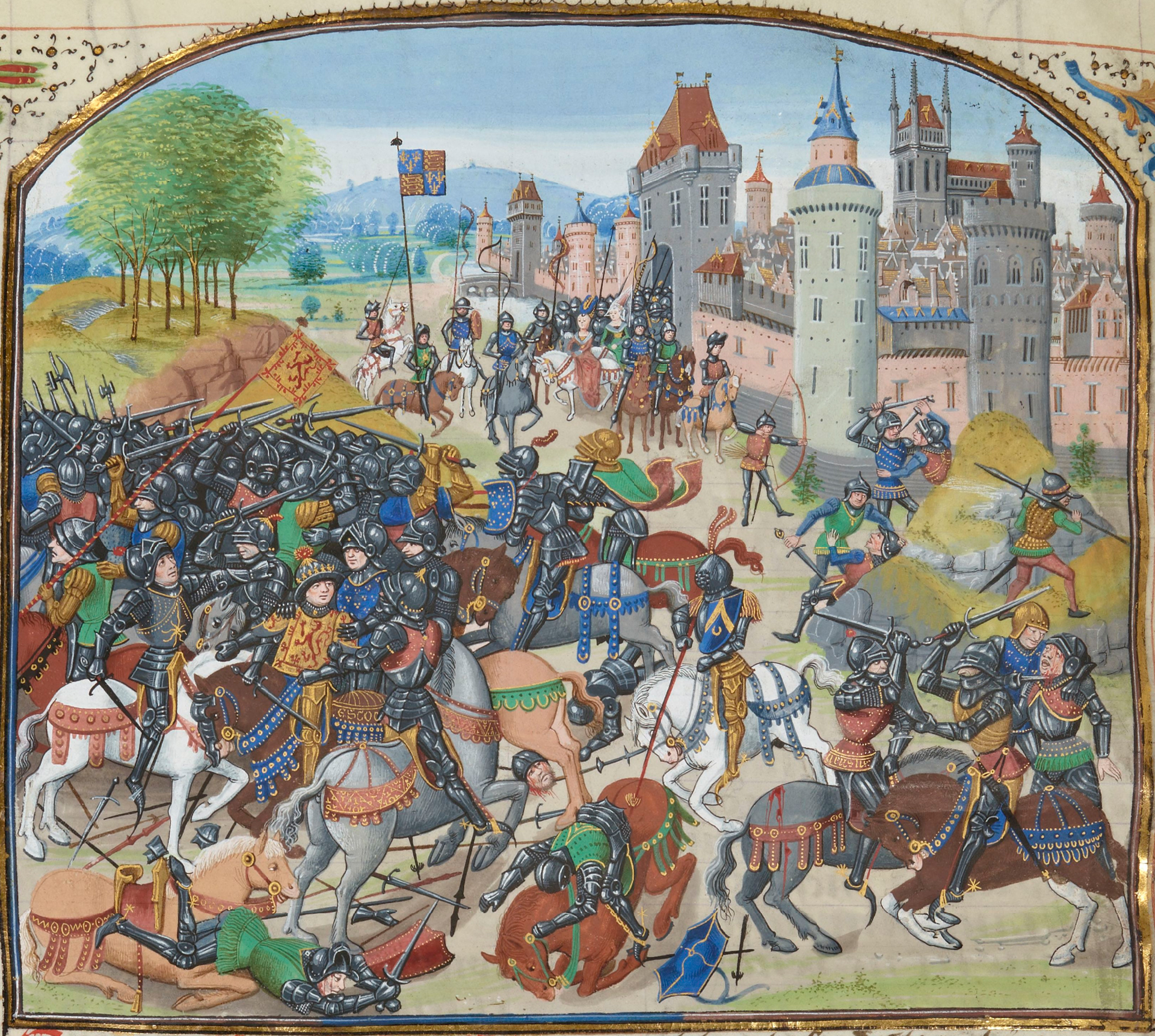
- Battle of Neville's Cross as depicted in Froissart's Chronicles
| Date | 1296–1603 |
| Location | Scotland, England |
| Result | Inconclusive |
| Territorial changes | Scotland maintains its independence from England.; England captures Berwick-upon-Tweed from Scotland in 1482.; Both kingdoms are joined in a personal union following 1603. |

Belligerents
| Kingdom of Scotland; Kingdom of France (until 1560) | Kingdom of England; Lordship of Ireland (until 1542); Kingdom of Ireland (from 1542) |

Casualties and losses
| Unknown | Unknown |

The Anglo-Scottish Wars comprise the various battles between the Kingdom of England and the Kingdom of Scotland from the time of the Wars of Independence in the early 14th century through to the latter years of the 16th century.

Although the Wars of Independence, in which Scotland twice resisted attempted conquest by Plantagenet kings of England, formally ended in the treaties of 1328 and 1357 respectively, relations between the two countries remained uneasy. Incursions by English kings into Scotland continued under Richard II and Henry IV and informal cross-border conflict remained endemic. Formal flashpoints on the Anglo-Scottish border included places remaining under English occupation, such as Roxburgh Castle and the port of Berwick-upon-Tweed. Roxburgh was recaptured by the Scots in 1460 under Mary of Guelders after the death of James II in the same campaign. Similarly, they captured Berwick in 1461 in exchange for support to the House of Lancaster. Berwick had changed hands a number of times in the past, and as one country attempted to take advantage of weakness or instability in the other, siding on one side in the civil war, culminating in final capture for the English of the Scottish port by the Yorkist nobleman Richard, Duke of Gloucester in 1482.

England's preoccupation with civil war during the Wars of the Roses and Scotland's aid to the Lancastrian cause may have been a component in the period of relative recovery for her northern neighbour during the course of the 15th century, and by the first decade of the 16th century James IV of Scotland and Henry VII of England were making overtures for lasting peace after aiding the latter, along with Scotland's ally France in the Battle of Bosworth. This broke down after the accession of the more overtly bellicose Henry VIII to the English throne and James IV's catastrophically misjudged incursion into Northumbria in 1513 ending in the Battle of Flodden. Three decades later, after the death of James V in 1542, the so-called 'rough wooing' at the hands of invading English armies under the Earl of Hertford brought manifest depredations to Scotland. The last pitched battle between Scotland and England as independent states was the Battle of Pinkie on September 10, 1547. Periods of fighting and conflict nevertheless continued.

France also played a key role throughout the period of the Anglo-Scottish Wars. Scots and English soldiers on French soil during the Hundred Years' War (1337–1453) generally fought on opposing sides, with the Scots standing for the French against the English under the Auld Alliance. France in later periods, in turn, often intervened on Scottish soil for the Scots. This French involvement had increasingly complex political consequences for all sides by the later 16th century.

The Anglo-Scottish Wars can be said to have formally ended with the Union of the Crowns in 1603, wherein England and Scotland entered a personal union under James VI and I, who inherited both crowns. Bloody conflict between the two states nevertheless continued to arise in different and more complex guise throughout the course of the 17th century.

== Border wars between Scotland and England ==
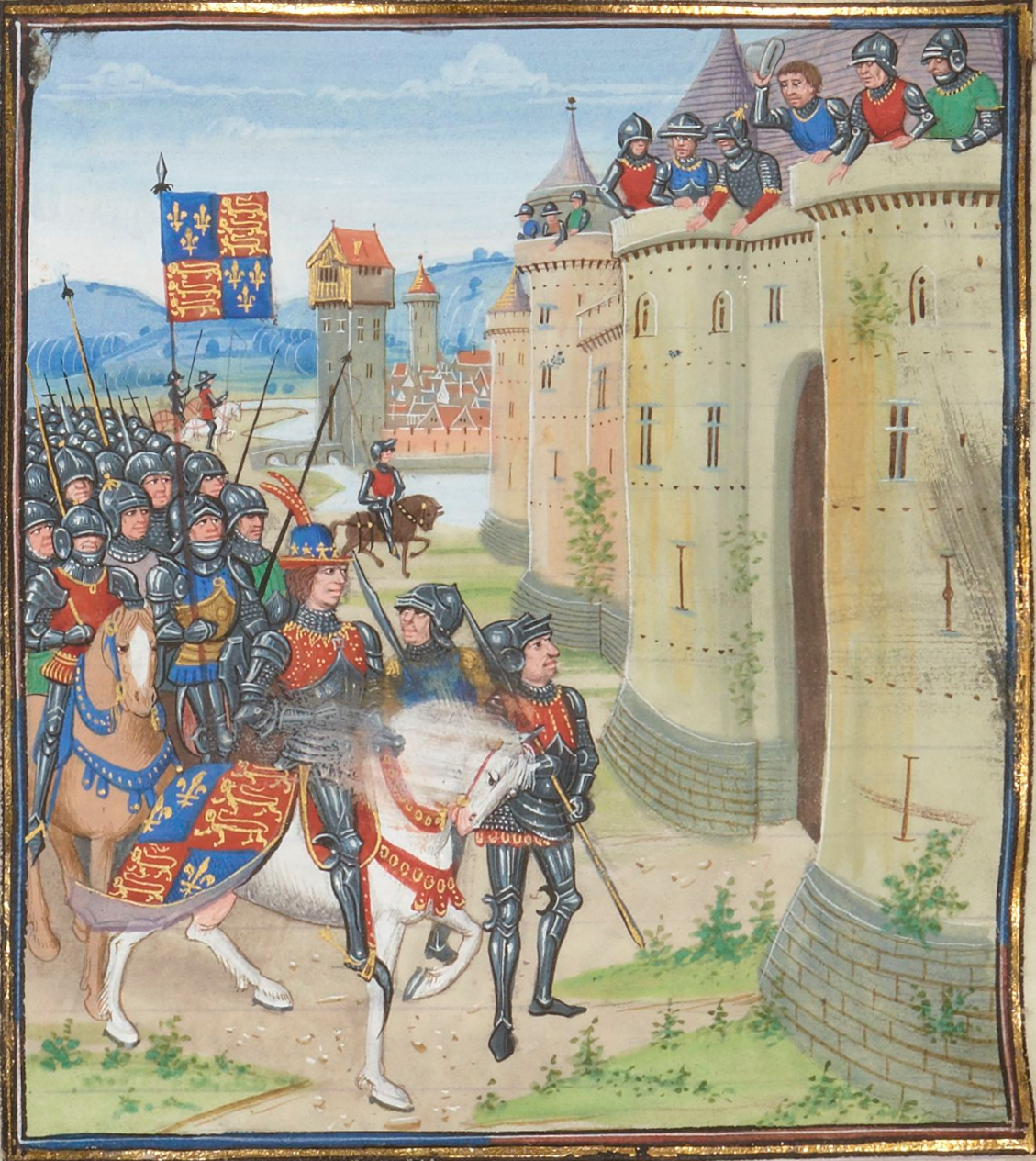
English army at Berwick upon Tweed, 1482

During the mid-15th century, there were many conflicts on the border of England and Scotland, most notably the Battle of Sark in 1448. These battles were the result of England's ongoing military campaigning in France and Scottish attempts to support the House of Valois.

During the English invasion in 1482, an army led by Richard, Duke of Gloucester captured Berwick-upon-Tweed in 1482 and continued to Edinburgh. Berwick has remained English since then.

== Flodden campaign ==
England under Henry VIII declared war on France in 1512 (as part of the larger conflict known as the War of the League of Cambrai). James IV of Scotland invaded England in fulfillment of his alliance with France (even though married to Henry's sister Margaret). In 1513, after preliminary raids by borderers came to grief, James's main army invaded England. His artillery quickly subdued English castles such as Norham and Wark. However, James issued a formal challenge for an open field battle to the English army under the Earl of Surrey and then fortified his position; this perceived lack of chivalry led Surrey to warn James that no quarter would be given or accepted. Surrey's army manoeuvred around the Scottish army, which launched an attack to open a route north to Scotland. In the resulting disastrous Battle of Flodden, James IV was killed, along with many of his nobles and gentry, the "Flowers of the Forest".

== 1514–1523 ==
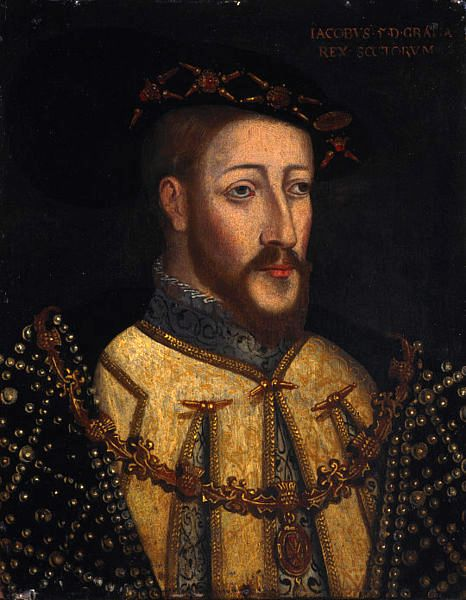
James V : King of Scotland

James V of Scotland was an infant barely a year old at his father's death. Various factions among the Scottish nobles contended for power, and custody of the young king. While Henry VIII secretly encouraged some of them, English armies and some families of English and nominally Scottish Border Reivers repeatedly forayed and looted in southwest Scotland, to maintain pressure on the Scottish authorities.

Eventually, after the faction of the Earl of Angus gained control, peaceful relations were restored between England and Scotland. (Part of the reason for Henry's mellowing was that the disorders he had provoked in Scotland threatened to spill south of the border.)

== Solway Moss campaign ==
When James V came of age and assumed control, he overthrew the Angus faction, and renewed Scotland's Auld Alliance with France. He married first Madeleine of Valois, a daughter of Francis I of France, and when she died a few months later of tuberculosis, he married Mary of Guise. Tension between England and Scotland increased once again; not least because Henry had already broken with the Roman Catholic Church and embarked upon the Dissolution of the Monasteries, whereas James held to Rome and gave authority to powerful prelates such as Cardinal David Beaton.

War broke out in 1541. Once again there were preliminary border skirmishes. A Scottish victory at the battle of Haddon Rig on 24 August 1542 was followed by the Duke of Norfolk's raid into Scotland. When James sent a large army into England, Scotland's leadership was weak and divided and it suffered a humbling defeat at the Battle of Solway Moss.

== Rough Wooing ==
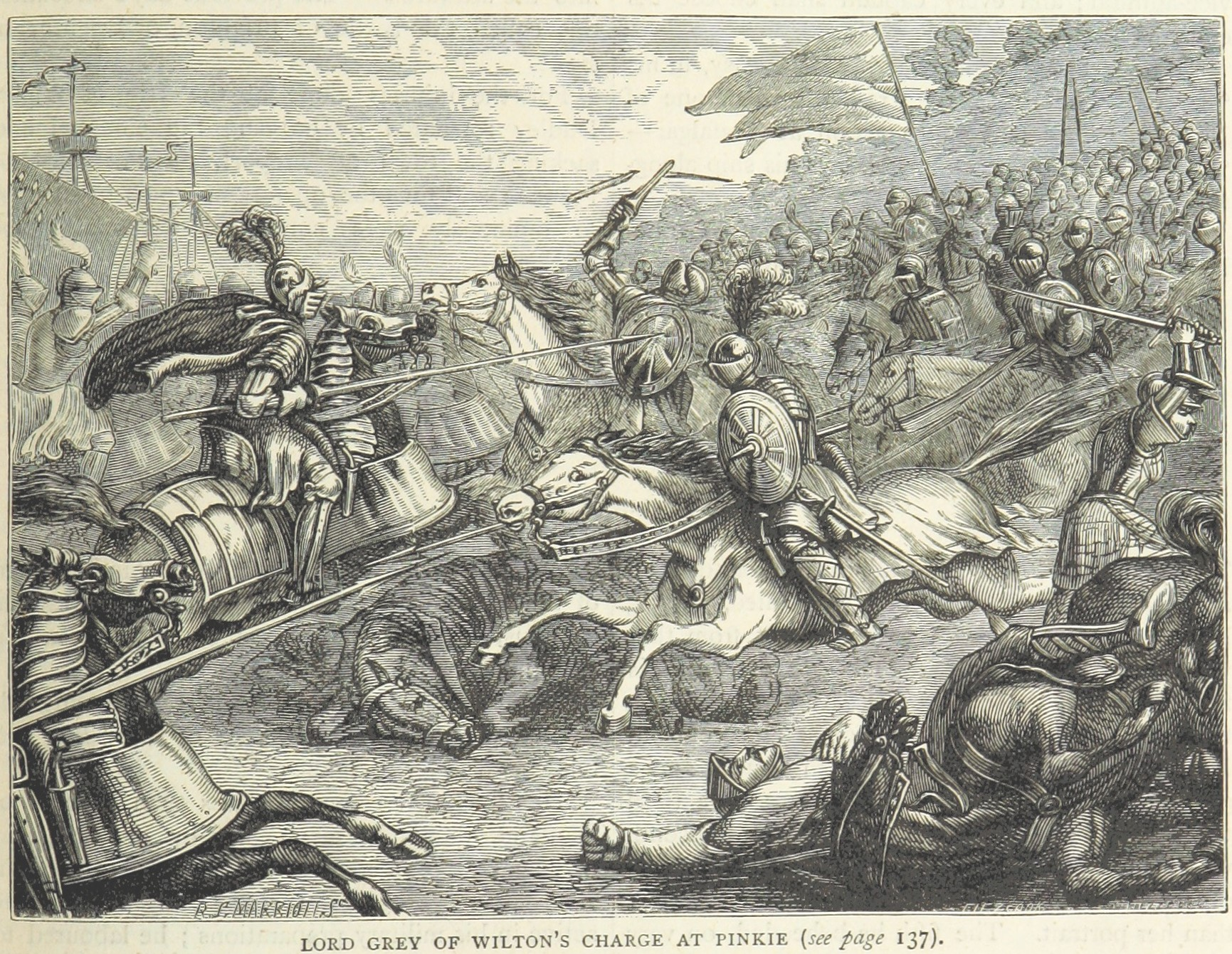
William Grey charges with the English cavalry in the early stages of the Battle of Pinkie Cleugh.

James died shortly after the defeat. Once again, Scotland's monarch was an infant, this time Mary, Queen of Scots. Henry tried to pressure a divided Scotland into an alliance, and secure the marriage of Mary to his son Edward. At first, in July 1543, the new ruler Regent Arran agreed to the Treaty of Greenwich. The treaty was broken, in part by the influence of Cardinal Beaton and supporters of Scotland's "auld alliance" with France. Henry VIII commenced the war now known as the "Rough Wooing".

In May 1544, Henry VIII sent an army under the Earl of Hertford, Edward's uncle, to burn Edinburgh and cause devastation and slaughter throughout southern Scotland, as a means of inducing a change of heart. Some Scottish landowners in the occupied region made compromises as "Assured Scots". Campaigning continued the next year, but some Scottish factions reconciled and won a victory at the Battle of Ancrum Moor, which temporarily halted English attacks.

Henry died in 1547. Hertford, now Protector and Duke of Somerset, renewed the attempt to enforce an alliance, and also to impose an Anglican church on Scotland. Protestant English forces aimed to deliver Scotland from the dreadful danger of Catholicism. The Battle of Pinkie was the last pitched battle between England and Scotland. Somerset hoped to limit devastation during the battle, but his forces had severely disrupted Scottish agriculture and supply chains. He had won a great victory at Pinkie, but Mary was smuggled to France to be betrothed to the Dauphin Francis. Fighting continued for some more years, notably at the siege of Haddington, and French troops assisted the Scots. Without lasting peace, Somerset's regime could not stand the expense of the war. He was overthrown and eventually executed.

== Reformation in Scotland ==
David Beaton was murdered in 1546, and within a few years, Scotland underwent a major religious reformation which was, unlike most European countries, remarkably peaceful and was never seriously threatened by counter-reformation, though neighboring England was to undergo a counter-reformation under Queen Mary I. For a while, both countries were distracted by internal troubles. Eventually, Queen Elizabeth I came to rule England and restore stability.

Scotland remained divided. During the crisis of the Scottish Reformation in 1560, the Catholic faction under the queen mother, Mary of Guise, held Leith and Edinburgh Castle. Elizabeth was invited to intervene for the Protestant faction by the Treaty of Berwick (1560). An English fleet commanded by William Wynter blockaded the Firth of Forth to prevent French aid reaching the Catholic forces, and English troops and artillery surrounded a French army in Leith.

For the later part of the 16th century, peace was ensured by the probability that James VI of Scotland, who was raised as a Protestant and was the son of Mary, Queen of Scots, would become King of England on the death of Elizabeth. There was perennial trouble from Border Reivers, but Elizabeth was inclined to forgive even their depredations rather than pick a quarrel with her Protestant neighbour.

== See also ==
- List of battles between Scotland and England
