= Battle of Connor =

1315 battle in Ireland

- Part of the Bruce campaign in Ireland
Date	10 September 1315
Location	Connor, County Antrim
Result	Scottish victory

Belligerents
Kingdom of Scotland and Gaelic allies	Lordship of Ireland and Gaelic allies

Commanders and leaders
Edward Bruce	Richard Óg Burke

Strength
At least 6,000	Unknown

Casualties and losses
Unknown	Unknown

The Battle of Connor was fought on 10 September 1315, in the townland of Tannybrake just over a mile north of what is now the modern village of Connor, County Antrim. It was part of the Bruce campaign in Ireland.

== Background ==
Edward Bruce landed in Larne, in modern-day County Antrim, on 26 May 1315. In early June, Donall Ó Néill of Tyrone and some twelve fellow northern Kings and lords met Edward Bruce at Carrickfergus and swore fealty to him as King of Ireland. Edward held the town of Carrickfergus, but was unable to take the Castle. His army continued to spread south, through the Moyry Pass to take Dundalk.

== Prelude ==
Outside the town of Dundalk, Bruce encountered an army led by John FitzThomas FitzGerald, 4th Lord of Offaly, his son-in-law Edmund Butler, Earl of Carrick and Maurice FitzGerald, 4th Baron Desmond. The Scottish pushed them back towards Dundalk and on 29 June lay waste to the town and its inhabitants.

By 22 July Edmund Butler, the Justicier in Dublin, assembled an army from Munster and Leinster to join Richard Óg de Burgh, 2nd Earl of Ulster to fight Bruce. De Burgh refused to let the government troops into Ulster, fearing widespread damage to his land. Bruce was able to exploit their dispute and defeat them separately.

== Battle ==
Bruce slowly retreated north, drawing de Burgh in pursuit. Bruce and his O’Neill allies sacked Coleraine, destroying the bridge over the River Bann to delay pursuit. Edward sent word to Fedlimd Ó Conchobair that he would support his position as king in Connacht if he would withdraw. He sent the same message to rival claimant Ruaidri mac Cathal Ua Conchobair. Cathal immediately returned home, raised a rebellion and declared himself king. De Burgh's Connacht allies under Felim then followed as Felim left to defend his throne. Edward's force then crossed the Bann in boats, and attacked. The Earl of Ulster withdrew to Connor.

The armies met in Connor on 10 September 1315. The superior force of Bruce and his Irish allies defeated the depleted Ulster forces. The capture of Connor permitted Bruce to re-supply his army for the coming winter from the stores the Earl of Ulster had assembled at Connor. Earl's cousin, William de Burgh, was captured, as well as other lords and their heirs. Most of his army retreated to the Castle of Carrickfergus, which the pursuing Scots put under siege. The Earl of Ulster managed to return to Connaught.

== Aftermath ==
The government forces under Butler did not engage Bruce, allowing him to consolidate his hold in Ulster. His occupation of Ulster encouraged risings in Meath and Connacht, further weakening de Burgh. Despite this, and another Scottish/Irish victory at the Battle of Skerries, the campaign was to be defeated at the Battle of Faughart.
