= St. Mary's Collegiate Church, Gowran =

Church in County Kilkenny, Ireland

St. Mary's Collegiate Church
- Eaglais Mhuire
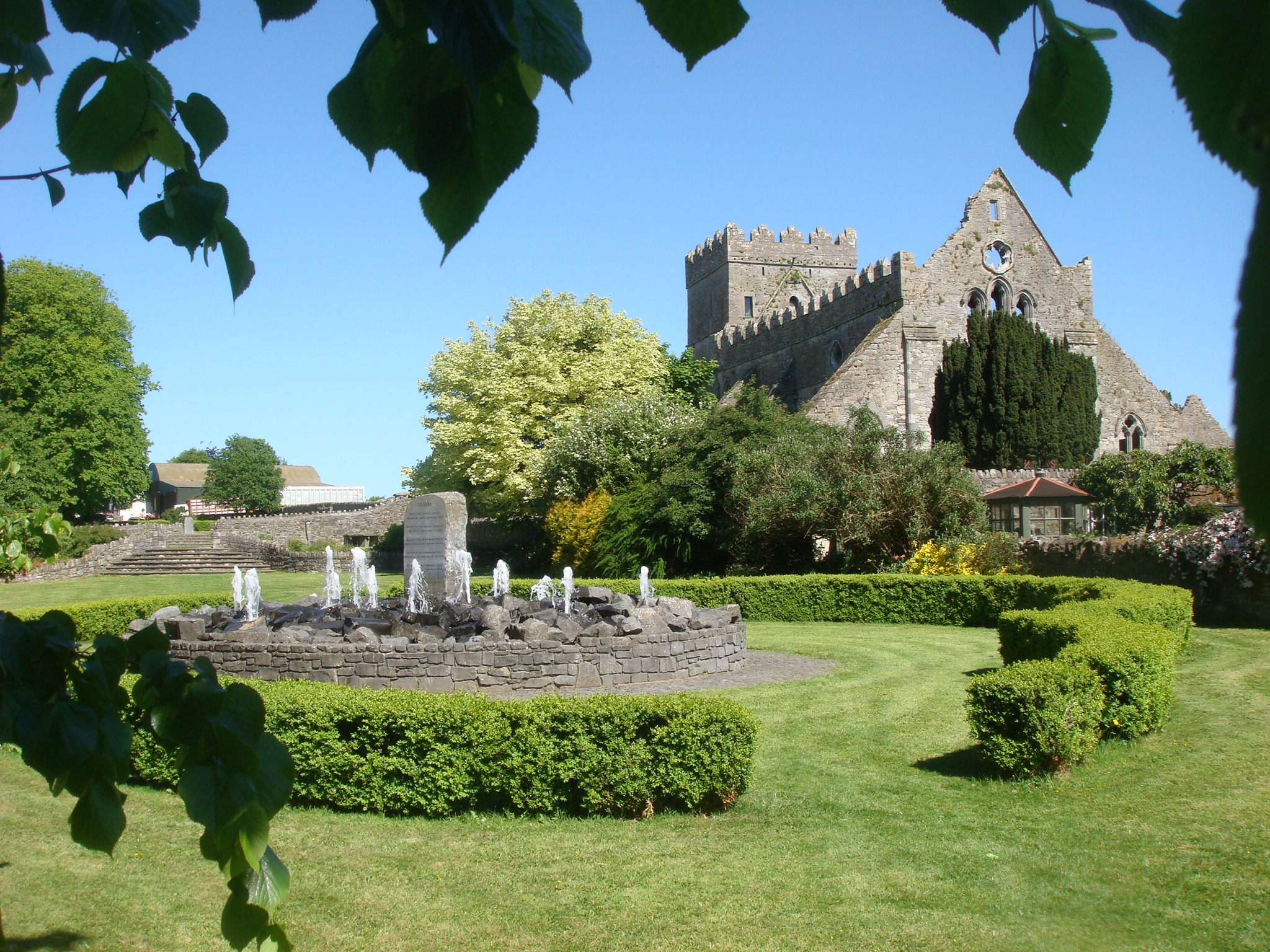
- Interactive map of the St. Mary's Collegiate Church area

General information
- Type: Collegiate Church
- Location: Gowran, County Kilkenny, Ireland, Main St. Gowran, County Kilkenny, Ireland
- Coordinates: 52°37′45″N 7°03′48″W
- Construction started: 1225

National monument of Ireland
- Reference no.: 214

St. Mary’s Collegiate Church Gowran (Irish: Eaglais Mhuire), also known as the Church of the Blessed Virgin of the Assumption, is a church in the centre of the town of Gowran, County Kilkenny, Ireland. The site is a National Monument in the care of the Gowran Development Association (GDA) and the Office of Public Works (OPW). The church and its family connections have been of huge importance to Gowran and further afield over the centuries. The church is a collegiate church, which means that the priests or chaplains attached to it lived in community together. The present church was not a monastery or an abbey; however experts believe the church was built on the site of an earlier monastery. The presence of an Ogham stone on the site, which is on display in the chancel, suggests there was a place of worship here dating back 2000 years to Celtic times or beyond.

== The Collegiate Church ==
In 1312 A.D. Edmund Butler, Earl of Carrick and Lord Deputy of Ireland made a binding agreement before the Kings Justice in Dublin with the Dean and Chapter of St Canice's Cathedral in Kilkenny to financially support four priests in St. Mary’s Church Gowran to celebrate masses forever, for himself, his wife Joan, his son, James Butler, 1st Earl of Ormonde, his daughters and his ancestors living and dead.

== The Gowran Ogham Stone ==
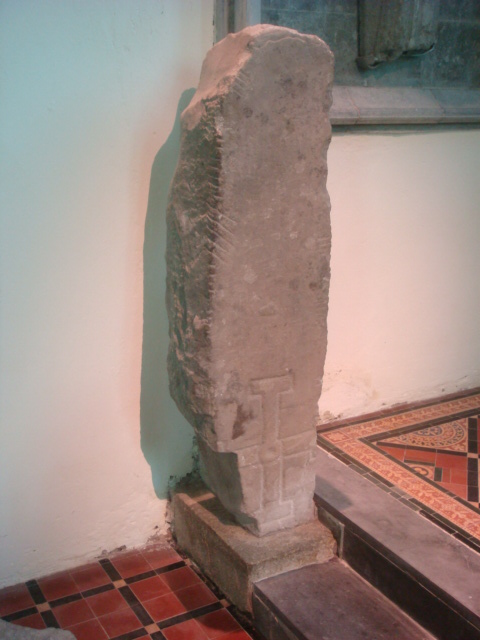
The Gowran Ogham Stone

The oldest inscribed monument in the church is the Christianised Ogham Stone from the 3rd or 4th century, which was found on the site during the rebuilding of the chancel in 1826. The Gowran Ogham Stone was used as a building stone in another part of the Church and lay undisturbed for centuries.

The Ogham stones were grave stones or memorials. The one in Gowran is a freestone or grit block: about 1.5 m (60 in) tall, 380 mm (15 in) across the face, and 30 mm (1.2 in) thick. Canon Carrigan gives Fr. Edmund Barry's reading as "DALO MAQA MUCOI MAQUI-ERACIAS MAQI LI", that is, "Dalach, grandson, of Mac-Eirche, who was son of Lia". The stone was Christianised (a Christian cross was carved on the stone) about the 6th century.

== History ==
St. Mary’s Church has undergone many alterations.

=== Pre-Christian to Medieval period ===
- 1st/2nd Century: foundation of the Kingdom of Osraige.
- 3rd/4th Century: Ogham stone. The presence of this Christianised Ogham stone suggests that this site was a site of worship in pre-Christian times, before St. Patrick arrived in Ireland in 432 A.D.
- 455 A.D. St. Patrick visits Gowran and builds churches in the area. Rev. John Francis Shearman on his book Loca Patriciana, published in 1879, detailing the travels of St. Patrick in Leinster and Ossory, makes several references to St. Patrick travelling through Belach Gabhrán (Old name for Gowran). Fr. Shearman says the first church was connected with the saint of Gowran, Saint Lochan, whose feast day is 31 December. St. Lochan was a son of Congall, son of Eirce, whose family history is given in Ossorian Geonology. A relation of Eirce is commemorated on the Gowran Ogham Stone.
- 1163 There is further evidence of a church on this site before the Norman invasion of Ireland in 1169. Dermot O Ryan, Chief of Idrone, made a grant of land for the foundation of the Cistercian Abbey of Killenny, De Valle Dei (the Valley of God). Killenny is about a mile and a half from Goresbridge on the Mount Loftus – Graiguenamanagh road. Laurence O Toole, Archbishop of Dublin, Dermot Mac Murrough, King of Leinster, Donagh Bishop of Leighlin, Felix O Dulaney, Abbot of the Cistersians in Ossory, and many nobles of south Leinster signed the document at Gowran.
- 1218 Ralph (Radoulfus) was portrieve (priest) of Gowran before 1218. He was influential in the Diocese of Ossory. A monument to commemorate Radoulfus is on display in the chancel. He is depicted on the monument wearing his priestly vestments.
- 1225 An early church was built with a square tower in the centre. This is believed to be the only church in Ireland from that period with a tower in the centre.

=== Medieval period to the 18th century ===
- 1415 Irish enemies surrounded the Church and burned it.
- 1421 Edward Bruce attacked the town of Gowran and further damaged the Church. The Pope granted Indulgences to those who, for the following ten years, gave alms for the repair and conservation of the Church of St. Mary the Virgin of Ballygowran (old name for Gowran). The height of the old tower was increased by adding the upper stories of the belfry to the tower. The tower was strengthened by building another layer of stone to the base on the north wall, which now slopes outwards at the base. The wall of the old tower and that of the new addition can be seen from the inside of the tower when looking up at the north wall. Buttresses were added to the nave.
- 15th century: major alterations were carried out.
- 1502 Margaret Fitzgerald, wife of Sir Piers Butler, decorated the Church.
- 1541 During the reign of King Henry the eight in England the religious practice in the church changed from Catholic to Reformed, more commonly known as Protestant or, in the case of St. Mary’s Church, the Church of Ireland. The church was used for worship by the Church of Ireland community until the 1970s.
- 1646 Kealy Mortuary Chapel built.
- 1700 The second half of the 1700s saw a period of decline in the built heritage of Ireland, with many of the landlords becoming absentee landlords and the aristocracy moving to England. Gowran Castle (the second castle, which was built in 1713; the first castle was built by James Butler third Earl of Ormonde in 1385. This James Butler is buried in St. Mary’s Church), which close to the church, also fell into dereliction. A 1791 picture of the church from the book Grose’s Antiquities of Ireland shows the south wall of the nave still standing but in disrepair, with heavy growth of ivy covering the walls.

=== 19th century to present ===
- 19th century: From the start of 1800s, this decline was reversed. The century saw the start of major improvements to the built heritage of Gowran. Many new houses in the town, like the Shamrock Cottages and Dovers Row, were built.
- 1816-1819 A new Gowran Castle was built.
- 1826 A new Chancel was rebuilt in St Mary’s Church to the designs of the Kilkenny architect of the period William Robertson who also designed the nearby Gowran Castle and most of the standing Kilkenny Castle we see today.
- 1850s The coming of the railway to Gowran and the construction of railway buildings were significant events in the area.
- 1881 George Ashlin modelled his plan for the Catholic Church of the Assumption Gowran on the nave of St. Mary’s Church. The Roman Catholic Church was built and in 1881 dedicated by Dr. Moran Bishop of Ossory, who had Gowran connections.
- 1900 A new school was built.
- 1960s The upper floor of the tower and the wall surrounding the top of the tower were reinstated.
- 1970s Church of Ireland worship finishes. Use of the church for service ended in the 1970s, bringing to an end over 700 years of worship in the church. The church was taken over by the OPW. A bust of James Agar and a holy water font, known as the Gowran Holy Water Font, which were in the church before it closed, were taken to St. Laserian’s Church in Old Leighlin, County Carlow, Ireland.
- 1988 The Gowran Development Association was founded. One of its aims was to enhance and develop St. Mary’s Church and surrounds.
- 1992-1995 Restoration of the boundary wall surrounding the graveyard was completed by the Gowran Development Association with support from the Fas (now Intreo) community employment scheme (CE scheme).
- 1995 Restoration of the chancel roof and stabilisation of the timber structure, which began in 1994, was completed. Stained glass windows were storm glazed. Representation was made by the Gowran Development Association to government ministers with a view to providing funding to the OPW for further improvements. Following these meetings the government committed a further £300,000 for improvement works on the church. Following stabilisation work on the roof, the interior of the chancel was renovated. The interior walls of the chancel were replastered in the traditional style using lime mortar and goat hair. Cracks in the tower were monitored and the tower found to be stable. Some of the monuments were rearranged in the chancel to make the building suitable for visitors. A number of monuments were brought in from the nave and positioned in the chancel to prevent weather erosion.
- 1996 The Upper Garden and Millennium Garden between the boundary wall to the front of the church and the main street were built by the Gowran Development Association with support from the CE scheme, Barrow Nore Sure Leader, (now Kilkenny Leader Partnership or KLP), and Kilkenny Co. Council under the Village Renewal Scheme.
- 2000 Flood lighting was installed around the building.
- 2010-2012 110 m (360 ft) of the wall to the rear of the graveyard was restored by the OPW using traditional skills and lime mortar mix. Parts of this wall are medieval. The wall was part of a wall surrounding the walled town of Gowran.
- 2013 Restoration work began on the nearby Gowran Castle.

== Oldest inscribed burial monument ==
The effigy of Ralph (Radoulfus) in his priestly vestments, the portrieve (priest) of Gowran in 1218, is believed to be the oldest burial monument in Ireland with a date on it. The inscription is carved in Latin around the edge of the monument in Lombardic lettering. The monument is dated 19 March 1253.

== Butler of Ormonde connections ==
Gowran was important to the Butlers of Ormond for over 500 years. Following the arrival of the Normans in Ireland in 1169, Gowran and lands surrounding it were granted to Theobald Walter, 1st Chief Butler of Ireland, ancestor of the Butlers. He incorporated the town of Gowran sometime after 1177. He died in 1206. Gowran was the chief seat of the Butlers in County Kilkenny until James Butler, 3rd Earl of Ormond, and also called the Earl of Gowran, bought Kilkenny castle in 1391. Gowran and St. Mary’s Church were important to the Butlers from the time of Theobald Fitzwalter and his son Theobald Butler. However it was their descendant Edmund Butler, Earl of Carrick, who established the Collegiate Church in Gowran, who first chose to be buried there. He and his brother Thomas went on a pilgrimage to the Shrine of St. James the Apostle at Santiago de Compostela in Spain in 1321. He died in London on his return on 13 September 1321. He was buried in St. Mary’s Church on 10 November 1321.

== Other family names on monuments ==
Agars - following the presence of the Butlers in Gowran for 500 years, the Cromwellian wars in Ireland, and the Cromwellian campaign in Gowran in 1650, Charles Agar came to Gowran from Yorkshire. Charles, his son James, and many of their descendants are buried in St. Mary’s church and commemorated on various monuments.

Other family names include Kealy, Rothe, and Moran. There are also a memorial stained glass window to the memory of Aubrey Cecil White from Gowran, who was killed in the 1914-18 war in the battle of the Somme on 1 July 1916 aged 20 years, and a monument to James Agar, who died on 30 December 1733.

== Monuments ==
Single Butler Knight Tomb – This is a mensa or table tomb. The single knight tomb was the first tomb carved in Gowran in the period 1500-1515. This tomb is believed to have been carved by the O Tunneys, the great Kilkenny stonemasons of this period.

Two Butler Knight – also a mensa tomb, it seems to belong to the same period 1515-1527.

Agar Monument – A large mural monument in classic style with Grecian pillars commemorates James Agar, who died in 1733.

== Burials ==
- Edmund Butler, Earl of Carrick
- James Butler, 1st Earl of Ormond
- James Butler, 2nd Earl of Ormond
- James Butler, 3rd Earl of Ormond

== Public access ==
The church grounds and gardens are open to visitors year round. The chancel is open to visitors during the months of May, June, July, and August. The Gowran Ogham Stone; the Effigy of Ralph; the effigies of James Butler, first Earl of Ormonde, and his wife, lady Eleanor De Bohun; the Butler Knight Tombs; the Agar Monument; a stained glass window dedicated to Aubrey Cecil White; Toler Aylward windows; and many other artefacts are on display in the chancel.

=== Special events ===
On 23 August 2014, during Heritage Week, there was a commemoration of World War One, including a talk and presentation on Aubrey Cecil White.

== Sources ==
- Kilkenny Standard, Thursday 22 February 1979 – Gowran an Ancient Town. p. 16
- The Kilkenny Journal Saturday, 16 October 1954. The Plot of Ground Near Gowran Church. Paper by Mrs. Drennan. p. 7
- Grose’s Antiquities of Ireland 1791
- 1840 Ordnance survey map of Gowran
- 1900 Ordnance survey map of Gowran
- 1650 Down survey map of Gowran area
- Kilkenny City and County. Guide and Directory by George Henry Bassett 1884
- The History and Antiquities of the Diocese of Ossory. Vol 3. Rev. Canon William Carrigan 1905
