= Battle of Faughart =

1318 Battle in Ireland

Coordinates: 54.04°N 6.38°W

Battle of Faughart Battle of Dundalk
- Part of the Bruce campaign in Ireland
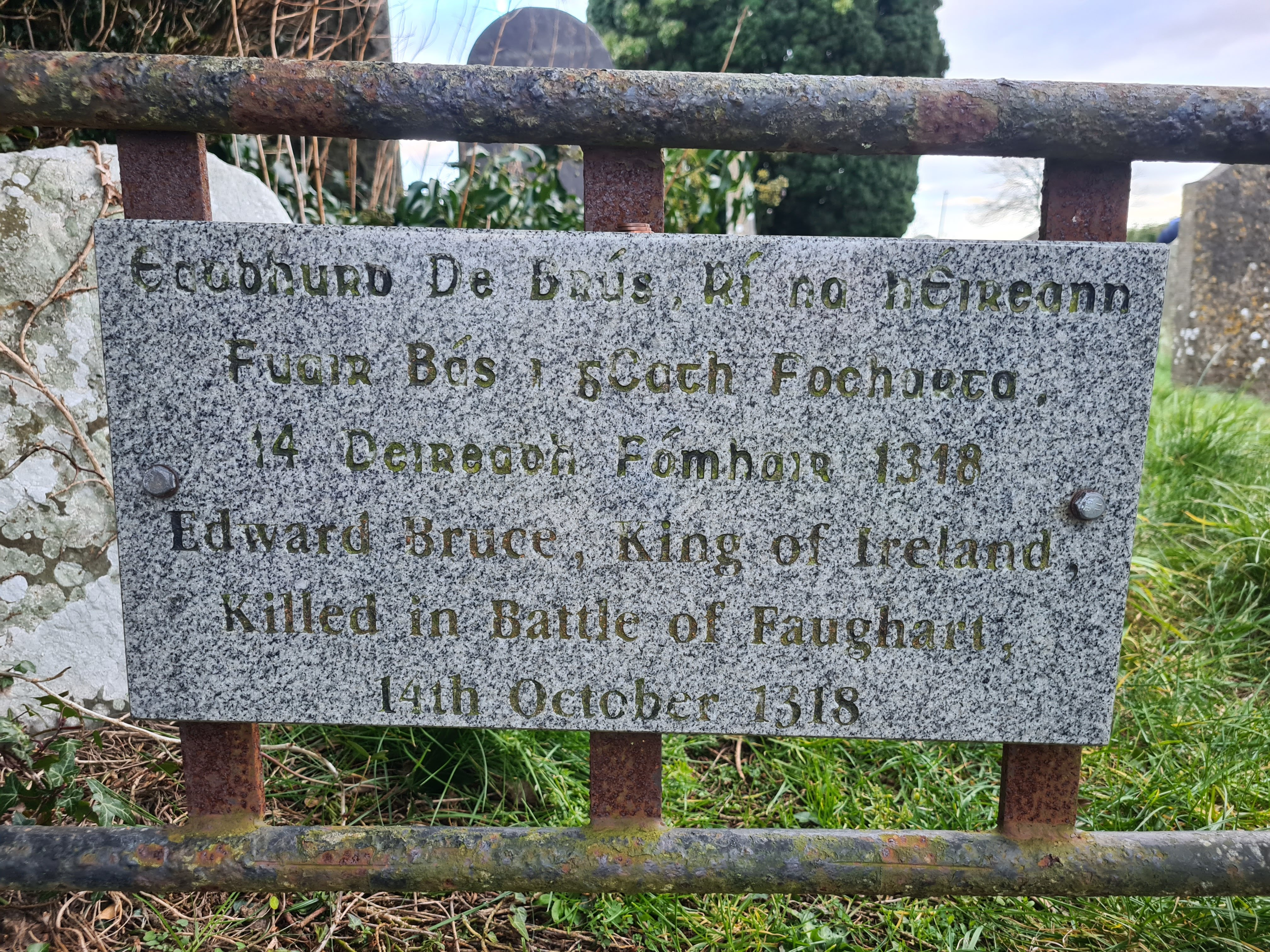
- Edward Bruce's grave stone
Date	14 October 1318
Location	Faughart, County Louth
Result	Anglo-Irish victory

Belligerents
Kingdom of Scotland and Gaelic allies	Lordship of Ireland and Gaelic allies

Commanders and leaders
Edward Bruce †	Earl of Louth; Earl of Carrick

Strength
2,000 and thousands of dispersed reinforcements	c. 20,000

Casualties and losses
30 knights and more than 80 men-at-arms killed	Light

The Battle of Faughart (or Battle of Dundalk) was fought on 14 October 1318 between an Anglo-Irish force led by John de Bermingham (later created 1st Earl of Louth) and Edmund Butler, Earl of Carrick, and a Scottish and Irish army commanded by Prince Edward Bruce, Earl of Carrick, brother of King Robert I of Scots ('Robert the Bruce'). It was a battle of the First War of Scottish Independence and more precisely the Irish Bruce Wars. The defeat and death of Bruce at the battle ended the attempt to revive the High Kingship of Ireland. It also ended, for the time being, King Robert's attempt to open up a second front against the English in the Wars of Scottish Independence.

== A united Gaelic realm ==
Although King Robert's victory over King Edward II of England at the Battle of Bannockburn in 1314 had effectively secured the independence of the Kingdom of Scotland, it did not bring the Scots' war with England any closer to an end. Even repeated Scots raids into the northern counties of England had little effect on an English king seemingly blind to political and military realities. Something more decisive was needed to end the stalemate. It came in 1315 with an invitation from Ireland.

Since the time of Henry II (r. 1154–1189), the Kings of England had also claimed to be the Lords of Ireland. English settlers had taken root in Ireland, chiefly along the eastern seaboard, north and south of Dublin. But Gaelic-Irish kings and lords still enjoyed a large measure of autonomy, especially in the north and west, and English control was often of a fluctuating nature. In continuing the war with Scotland, Edward II had made heavy demands on the Irish, both for men and materials, pushing the country close to the point of financial ruin.

King Robert, who long maintained political and personal contacts with the aristocrats of Ulster, decided that Irish discontent could be usefully employed against his enemy. He sent envoys to the native Irish kings and clergy with letters invoking the common ancestry of the two nations, and offering to help them recover their liberty. Domnall Ó Neill, king of Tír Eoghain, responded, asking for aid against the English and offering the kingship of Ireland to King Robert's brother, Prince Edward Bruce, who was Earl of Carrick in the Peerage of Scotland. The Bruce brothers could trace ancestral links to prominent rulers in Ireland and connected their line to the Ó Néill clan through their own maternal ancestor Aoife MacMurrough (c. 1153 – c. 1188). (Note: The family tree includes the following: Dermot MacMurrough 1110-1171, King of Leinster, who sired: Aoife MacMurrough (1153-1188), who married Richard de Clare, 2nd Earl of Pembroke (1130-1176, prominent in the Anglo-Norman invasion of Ireland and known as "Strongbow") and gave birth to: Isabel de Clare, 4th Countess of Pembroke (1172 - 1220), who married William Marshal, 1st Earl of Pembroke (c. 1146-1219) and who had issue: Isabel Marshal (1200-1240), who married Gilbert de Clare, 5th Earl of Gloucester (1180-1230) and who bore: Isabella of Gloucester and Hertford (1226-1264), who married Robert de Brus, 5th Lord of Annandale (1215-1295) and had issue: Robert de Brus, 6th Lord of Annandale (1243-c. 1304), the father of: Edward Bruce (1280-1318)) In May 1315 Edward Bruce landed with an expeditionary force at Larne near Carrickfergus Castle, ready to conjure up the spirit of "Gaelic internationalism".

== High King ==
Bruce was joined by several local chieftains and gained some early successes against the Anglo-Irish aristocracy. He won his first engagement near Jonesborough in the Moyry Pass and sacked nearby Dundalk on 29 June. Bruce was able to exploit disputes between his two leading opponents—Richard de Burgh, Earl of Ulster, and Edmund Butler, Earl of Carrick in the Peerage of Ireland and Justiciar of Ireland, and defeat them piecemeal. De Burgh, King Robert's father-in-law, was routed at the Battle of Connor in County Antrim on 10 September, and Butler at the Battle of Skerries in Kildare on 1 February 1316. Edward was then secure enough to proceed to Dundalk, where he was crowned High King on the hill of Maledon on 2 May 1316.

By the spring of 1316, it looked as if the Irish venture was to be a strategic success. It came, however, at the worst possible time. In Ireland, as elsewhere across much of Europe, the weather was so bad that the whole period was later likened to a mini ice-age. Historians refer to the "Great Famine of 1315–1317". Crops failed and people began to starve. Depending on local sources of supply, Bruce's campaigns began to resemble nothing more than large-scale plundering raids, carried out at the expense of an already desperate peasantry. In these circumstances it is hardly surprising that the supposed kinship of the Celts failed to materialise, and for most Irish the Scots were little better, if not worse, than the English settlers with whom they were familiar. A Connacht tract of this time refers to "Scottish foreigners less noble than our own foreigners". In the end, rather than acting as a true High King, Bruce could wield power in only parts of the north, and he was held there by problems of provisioning and supply. The opportunity to attempt an extension had to wait until 1318, when the weather, and the harvest, improved.

== Faughart ==
Unfortunately, the sources provide little in the way of detail and background for the Battle of Faughart. According to John Barbour, the Scottish chronicler, Edward Bruce was the architect of his own defeat, deciding to engage a larger enemy force (20,000 strong in his account) without waiting for reinforcements from Scotland, a view which finds some support in the Annals of Clonmacnoise, where it is recorded that "anxious to obtain the victory for himself, he did not wait for his [Sir John Stewart's] brother." He took up position on the rising ground at Faughart, not far from Dundalk, on 14 October. When his Irish allies objected to facing a stronger enemy force in battle Bruce responded by placing them in the rear, close to the top of the hill, leaving some 2000 Scots troops to face the enemy onslaught.

In contrast to Barbour, the Lanercost Chronicle, the chief English source, says that Bruce approached Dundalk "with a great army of Scots which had already arrived in Ireland." It would seem that the three English commanders—John de Bermingham, Edmund, Lord Carrick, and Roland Jorz, Archbishop of Armagh—were themselves attacked, though in a somewhat impetuous and haphazard fashion. Lanercost gives by far the clearest description of the action that followed:

The Scots were in three columns at such a distance from each other that the first was done with before the second came up, and then the second before the third, with which Edward was marching could render any aid. Thus the third column was routed just as the two preceding ones had been. Edward fell at the same time and was beheaded after death; his body being divided into four quarters, which were sent to the four chief quarters of Ireland

We have no precise figures for the number slain, though it is known that thirty Scottish knights and more than eighty men-at-arms died. The dead included a Mac Ruaidhrí ("King of the Hebrides") and a Mac Domhnaill ("King of Argyll"). (Note: The identity of these men is uncertain, although they seem to have been leading members of Clann Ruaidhrí and Clann Domhnaill.) This would suggest that most, if not all, of the Scottish force was drawn from the Gaels of the Western Isles and from Bruce's own earldom of Carrick in Ayrshire. Defeat was followed by the almost complete collapse of the Scottish position in Ulster: Carrickfergus Castle was recaptured on 2 December. John de Bermingham received most of the credit for the victory, and was created Earl of Louth by a grateful King of England. It was not to be the end of Scottish involvement in Ireland; but there were to be no more high kings.

While in some ways a failure, the Scottish adventure in Ireland did serve the purpose of Scotland's King Robert the Bruce, as never again were the English able to use a base in Ireland to mount an attack on the western seaboard of Scotland.

== Sources ==
=== Primary ===
- Annals of Clonmacnoise, translated by Connell MacGeoghegan (1627), ed. Denis Murphy (1896). The Annals of Clonmacnoise. Dublin: Royal Society of Antiquaries of Ireland.
- Annals of Loch Cé, ed. and tr. W. M. Hennessy (1871). The Annals of Loch Cé. Rolls Series 54. 2 vols. Dublin: Longman. (Available from CELT: Edition and translation of vol. 1 (s.a. 1014-1348); Edition and translation of vol. 2 (s.a. 1349-1590))
- Barbour, John, The Bruce, ed. A.A.M. Duncan, 1964
- The Lanercost Chronicle. ed. H. Maxwell, 1913

=== Secondary ===
- McNamee, C., The Wars of the Bruces. Scotland, England Ireland, 1306–1328, 1997
- Sayles, G.O. The Battle of Faughart, in Robert Bruce's Irish Wars, ed. S. Duffy, 2002
- Scott, Raold McNair Robert the Bruce, King of the Scots, 1987
