= Battle of Skerries =

1316 battle in Skerries, County Kildare

- Part of the Bruce campaign in Ireland
Date	26 January 1316
Location	near Ardclough, County Kildare 53°17′49″N 6°33′54″W
Result	Scottish victory

Belligerents
Kingdom of Scotland and Gaelic allies	Lordship of Ireland and Gaelic allies

Commanders and leaders
Edward Bruce	Earl of Carrick; Earl of Desmond

Strength
At least 6,000	10,000 approx

Casualties and losses
Unknown	Unknown

The Battle of Skerries, also named the Battle of Ardscull, took place during the Bruce campaign in Ireland – part of the First War of Scottish Independence – fought on 26 January 1316, resulting in a Scottish victory. It was part of the Irish campaign of Edward Bruce, brother of Robert Bruce, king of Scotland. The site of the battle was Skerries near Ardscull in County Kildare.

== The battle ==
Edward Bruce, earl of Carrick, had landed in Ireland in May the year before, and been proclaimed king of the island in June. Bruce continued on his march south, when on 26 January 1316 the Scottish army was advancing from Castledermot it encountered the English. The Hiberno-Norman forces, summoned by the justiciar of Ireland, consisted of men such as John FitzThomas FitzGerald, Maurice FitzThomas FitzGerald, Thomas FitzJohn, John and Arnold Poer, Maurice de Rocheford, and Miles and David de la Roche. Though these forces heavily outnumbered those of Bruce, internal strife broke out in the Anglo-Irish ranks, a fact that Bruce could take advantage of. Though suffering heavy losses, the Scots held the battlefield, effectively winning the battle.

== Aftermath ==
The official English account of the battle blamed unfortunate terrain and bad luck for the government forces' loss, not an entirely convincing explanation. The same account also claims that the Scots lost many of their greatest men, while their opponents only lost one man.

After the battle the Scots plundered the nearby town of Athy before withdrawing to Leix, while the Anglo-Irish forces kept them under surveillance from nearby Castledermot, while their leader withdrew to Dublin. Here John Hotham, the king's envoy to Ireland, made a great effort to ensure the loyalty of the Irish nobles. By May, however, Bruce had returned to his safe base in Ulster, while Hotham had returned to his new position in England as Bishop of Ely.
