= Siege of Berwick (1318) =

Event in the First War of Scottish Independence

Capture of Berwick
- Part of the First War of Scottish Independence
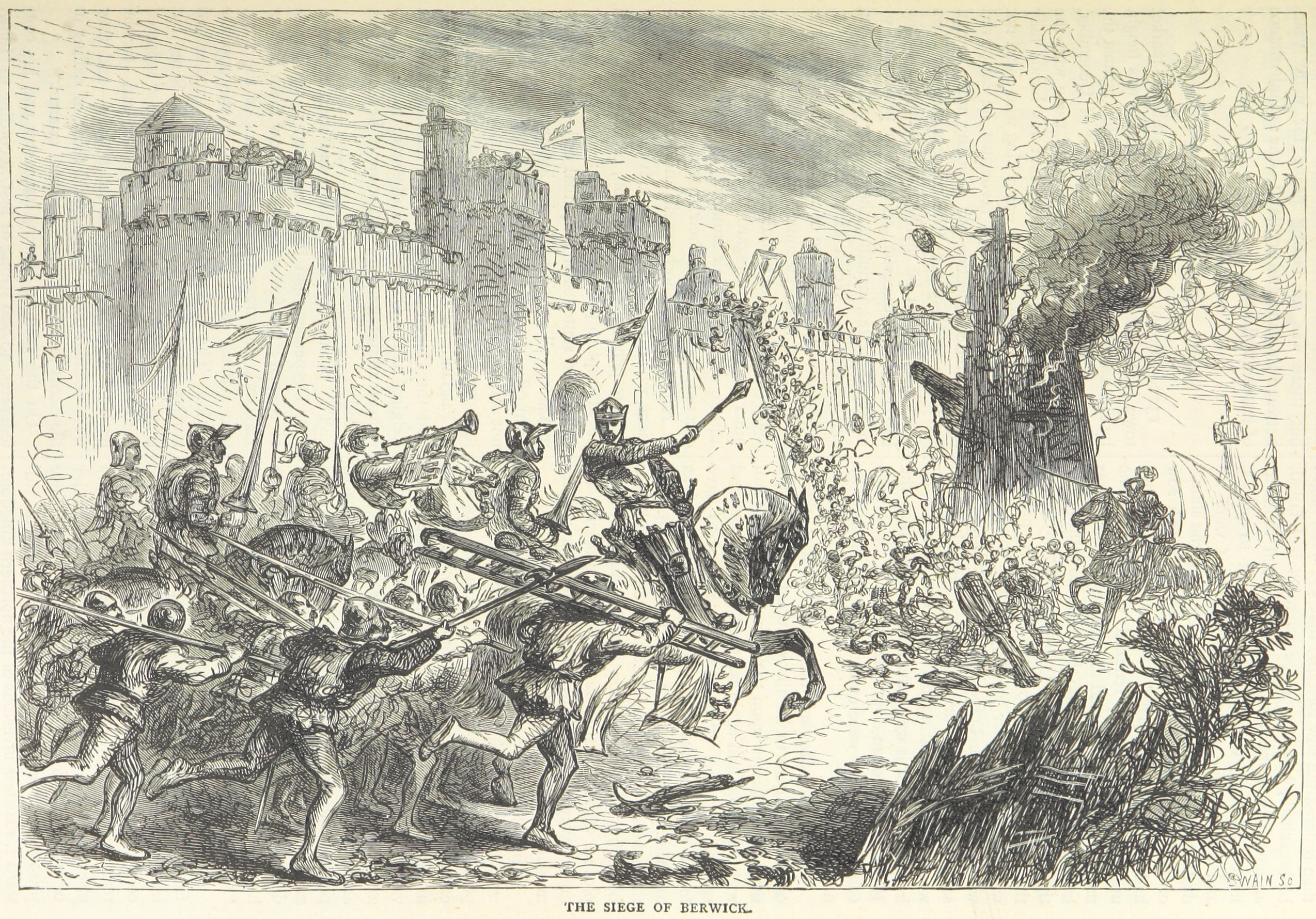
- An 1873 drawing of the siege
Date	April 1318
Location	Berwick-Upon-Tweed 55.771°N 2.007°W
Result	Scottish victory

Belligerents
Kingdom of England	Kingdom of Scotland

Commanders and leaders
Maurice de Berkeley	Sir James Douglas; Sir Walter Stewart

Strength
Unknown	Unknown

Casualties and losses
Unknown	Unknown

The siege of Berwick was an event in the First War of Scottish Independence which took place in April 1318. Sir James Douglas, Lord of Douglas took the town and castle of Berwick-upon-Tweed from the English, who had controlled the town since 1296.

== Fall of Berwick ==
Following the decisive Scots victory at the Battle of Bannockburn in 1314, the Scots had recovered all their strongholds, with the exception of Berwick. In September 1317, King Robert Bruce attempted a siege of Berwick, which lasted until November before he withdrew. The following April, Peter Spalding helped followers of Robert the Bruce enter and seize the town of Berwick from the English. He was English and a burgess of the town, but he was married to a cousin of Sir Robert Keith, Great Marischal of Scotland. The raiding party, led by Sir James Douglas, and possibly the Earl of Dunbar, took the town after a fight. The castle was warned when they lost control of their men, who began to plunder and failed to capture the castle. King Robert soon arrived with an army, and after an eleven-week siege, the castle garrison capitulated due to a lack of supplies. The English burgesses were expelled, and King Robert re-established Berwick as a Scottish trading port, installing his son-in-law Walter Stewart as Keeper.

== Aftermath ==
The retaking of Berwick was a significant victory for the Scots. Historian Michael Brown notes that "symbolically, the capture of town and then castle marked the completion of King Robert's realm and kingship." However, Berwick would change hands several more times in the years to come, before permanently becoming part of England when the town was captured in 1482.
