= Edmund Butler, Earl of Carrick =

Irish nobleman and administrator

Edmund Butler (died 1321), 6th Chief Butler of Ireland and nominally Earl of Carrick, was an Irish magnate who served as Justiciar of Ireland during the difficult times of the Scottish invasion from 1315 to 1318 and the great famine of 1316 to 1317.

== Origins ==
Born before 1278, he was a younger son of Theobald Butler, 4th Chief Butler of Ireland, and his wife Joan FitzGeoffrey, daughter of John FitzGeoffrey and Isabel Bigod. His elder brother, Theobald Butler, was the heir at the death of his father in 1285 but died childless in 1299, when he inherited the paternal estates and titles. On the death of his mother in 1303, he inherited her lands and titles in Ireland and in England.

== Career ==
After sitting in the Parliament of Ireland in 1302 under his own name without any territorial designation, he acted as deputy to the Justiciar of Ireland from November 1304 to May 1305 and on a visit to England in 1309 was knighted by King Edward II. From August 1312 to June 1314, he was Justiciar of Ireland, heading the government of the island, and acting frequently in a judicial capacity by holding assizes. During that time he organised a successful campaign to subdue the O'Byrne clan in Leinster and at a Michaelmas feast in Dublin in 1313 he created thirty new knights.

From February 1315 to April 1318 he served once more as Justiciar, for the last year under Roger Mortimer, who had been appointed over him as the King's representative in Ireland. In 1315 he led the Irish forces to Dundalk where they confronted the invading Scots under Edward Bruce, brother of Robert Bruce, who then retreated into the north. When the Scots advanced southwards again in 1316, he was at the inconclusive battle of Skerries in Kildare. The following year, with Robert Bruce joining his brother, the invaders attacked again and Butler's forces confronted them at Limerick, forcing them to retreat, starving. It was alleged that Butler's leadership of a divided and fractious country was not glorious and to counter these views Edward II issued a declaration "to clear the fair name of Edmund Butler, who has been accused of having assisted the Scots in Ireland, that he has borne himself well and faithfully towards the king".

In 1315 Edward II had granted him the manors of Carrick-on-Suir and Roscrea in Tipperary, with the title of Earl of Carrick, and he was also given return of writs in some cantreds of Tipperary and Offaly, Though sometimes referred to as Earl in his lifetime, the title was not widely recognised and did not pass to his son. In 1320 he was released by the Pope from a vow to make a pilgrimage to Santiago de Compostela and spent his remaining time in England, where in 1321 he was negotiating a marriage of his daughter Joan to a son of Roger Mortimer, settling lands in Ireland on the couple. On 13 September 1321 he died in London and the next month his body was buried in St. Mary's Collegiate Church at Gowran in Kilkenny, where the Bishop of Ossory and the Prior of the Hospitallers had undertaken to supply four priests to pray for his soul and those of family members.

== Marriage and children ==
In 1302 he married Joan FitzGerald, daughter of John FitzGerald, later 1st Earl of Kildare, and his wife Blanche, daughter of John Roche, of Fermoy Their children included:

- James Butler (died 1338), later 1st Earl of Ormond, who succeeded him as Chief Butler of Ireland but not as Earl of Carrick
- John Butler of Clonamicklon
- Joan Butler, engaged in 1321 to a Roger Mortimer.
- a daughter, possibly Margaret Butler, supposed to have married Sir Thomas Dillon, of Drumrany

== See also ==
- Butler dynasty
