= Bruce campaign in Ireland =

Medieval campaign in Ireland

- Part of First War of Scottish Independence
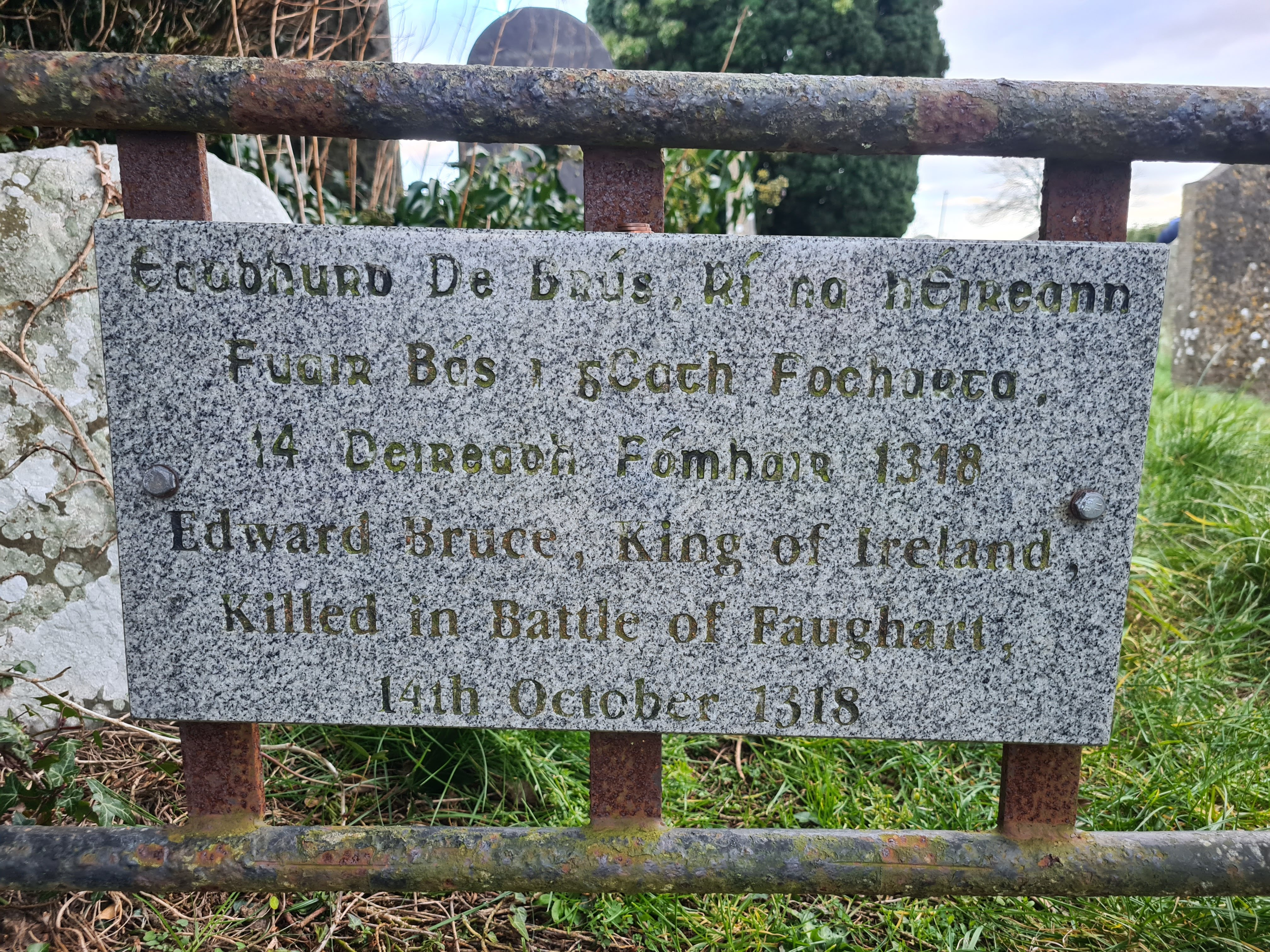
- Gravestone at Faughart: "Edward Bruce, King of Ireland, Killed in Battle of Faughart 14th October 1318"
| Date | 26 May 1315 – 14 October 1318 (3 years, 4 months and 18 days) |
| Location | Ireland |
| Result | English victory, but rule in Ireland severely weakened, Irish chiefs would continue fighting and limit English rule to the "Pale" an area around Dublin |

Belligerents
| Scotland; Irish kingdoms: Tír Eoghain; Tír Chonaill; Airgíalla; West Breifne; Connacht; Thomond; Desmond; Uí Maine; Tethba | England: Lordship of Ireland |

Commanders and leaders
| Edward Bruce †; Domnall Ó Néill; Felim O'Connor †; Tadhg Ó Cellaigh †; Donnchad Ó Briain; Ualgharg O'Ruairc | Richard Óg de Burgh; Sir Thomas de Mandeville; Roger Mortimer; John de Bermingham; Edmund Butler; Maurice FitzGerald |

Strength
| c. 6,000 men (Scotland); c. 3,000 men (Connacht); c. 1,400 men (Breifne); 300 Ships (Scotland) | c. 20,000 |

Casualties and losses
| Unknown | Unknown |

The Bruce campaign was a three-year military campaign in Ireland by Edward Bruce, brother of the Scottish king Robert the Bruce. It lasted from his landing at Larne in 1315 to his defeat and death in 1318 at the Battle of Faughart in County Louth. It was part of the First War of Scottish Independence against England, and the conflict between the Irish and Anglo-Normans.

After his victory at the Battle of Bannockburn, Robert the Bruce decided to expand his war against the English by sending an army under his younger brother Edward to invade Ireland. Some native Irish leaders also asked him to send an army to help drive the Anglo-Normans out of Ireland, offering to crown his brother High King of Ireland in return. Another reason for the expedition was that supporters of the exiled House of Balliol, rival competitors for the Crown of Scotland, had fled to Ireland.

The campaign effectively ended with Edward's defeat and death in the Battle of Faughart in 1318.

== Historical background ==
By the early 14th century, Ireland had not had a high king since Ruaidri mac Tairrdelbach Ua Conchobair (Rory O'Conor) who had been deposed by his son in 1186. Further, the Plantagenet dynasty had claimed a right to take control of Ireland by the papal document Laudabiliter in 1155 and indirectly ruled much of the eastern part of the island. The country was divided between the Gaelic dynasties that survived the Norman invasion and the Hiberno-Norman Lordship of Ireland.

In 1258 some of the Gaelic aristocrats elected Brian Ua Néill high king; however, he was defeated by the Normans at the Battle of Downpatrick in 1260.

== Invasion of Ireland ==
In 1315 Robert the Bruce, King of Scots, sent his younger brother Edward Bruce to invade Ireland. There have been several theories as to the motives behind Bruce's campaign in Ireland. One theory proposed for the invasion of Ireland was to drain England of men, materials and finance and even to exploit the resources in Ireland for Scotland's benefit, a second front in the ongoing war, as England relied heavily on Ireland for resources and deprive the English of Irish tax revenues contributing to the war effort. This became critical when King Robert's control of the Isle of Man was lost to Norman-backed Scots in January 1315, opening a threat to the south and southwest of Scotland, and also reopening up a potential source of aid to England from the Hiberno-Normans and Gaelic Irish.

Added to this was a request for aid from the King of Tír Eógain (Tyrone), Domnall mac Brian Ó Néill (Donall Ó Néill). Ó Néill had been troubled by Norman incursions to the southeast (the de Verdons), the east (tenants of the Earl of Ulster) and west (also by the Earl of Ulster) of Tír Eógain and to retain his lands, he and some twelve of his vassals and allies jointly asked for aid from Scotland. The Bruce brothers agreed, on condition that Edward would be supported as King of Ireland. The brothers envisaged themselves as separate rulers of Scotland and Ireland. Robert would regain Man and Edward would possibly make an attack on Wales, with Welsh support. Their vision included "a grand Gaelic alliance against England" between Scotland and Ireland, both countries having a common heritage, language and culture.

When Ó Néill approved of conditions for himself and on behalf of his vassals, preparations began. Roger Mortimer, 3rd Baron Mortimer, received news from Irish sources around this time that an invasion was about to take place, and made his way to Ireland, where he held land mainly in and around the castle and town of Trim. He had previously fought against the Bruces at Bannockburn where he was taken prisoner and freed to return King Edward II's royal seal, lost in the rout.

The Scottish Parliament met at Ayr on 26 April 1315, just across the North Channel from Antrim. As King Robert did not yet have a legitimate son, Edward was proclaimed his legal heir and successor as King of Scots and all other titles in case of his death. Edward's invasion fleet also mustered there, having received calls to assemble as far back as at least the previous month.

== Campaign of 1315 ==
On 26 May 1315 Edward and his fleet (and more than 5,000 men) landed on the Irish coast at points at and between Olderfleet Castle at Larne, and Glendrum. His brother had sailed from Tarbert for the Western Isles with his son-in-law Walter Stewart, to subjugate them till "all the isles, great and small, were brought to his will." Edward faced by an army led by vassals and confederates of the Earl of Ulster, the de Mandevilles, Bissets of the Glens, Logans, and Savages, as well as their Irish allies, overall led by Sir Thomas de Mandeville. However they were defeated in battle by the Scots under Thomas Randolph, Earl of Moray. Subsequently, the Scots managed to take the town, though not the castle, of Carrickfergus.

In early June, Donall Ó Néill of Tyrone and some twelve fellow northern Kings and lords met Edward Bruce at Carrickfergus and swore fealty to him as King of Ireland. The Irish annals state that Bruce "took the hostages and lordship of the whole province of Ulster without opposition and they consented to him being proclaimed King of Ireland and all the Gaels of Ireland agreed to grant him lordship and they called him King of Ireland." At this point Bruce directly or indirectly ruled much of eastern and mid-Ulster.

In late June, Edward proceeded with his army from Carrickfergus along Magh Line (Six Mile Water), burning Rathmore, near Antrim town, which was a holding of the Savages. He then went south by way of the Moiry Pass – called "Innermallan"/"Enderwillane"/Imberdiolan" in contemporary accounts – between Newry and Dundalk. This ancient routeway had been for centuries the passage south out of Ulster into the Kingdom of Mide, Leinster and Munster but because of its narrowness Ulster armies had frequently ambushed and been ambushed at the pass. Here he was met by Mac Duilechain of Clanbrassil and Mac Artain of Iveagh, both of whom had submitted to him at Carrickfergus. Their attempted ambush ended in their defeat and the army pressed on, destroying de Verdon's fortress of Castleroache, and on 29 June attacked Dundalk. The town, another possession of the de Verdon's, was almost totally destroyed with its population, both Anglo-Irish and Gaelic, massacred alike.

In July, two separate armies opposing Bruce met and assembled at Sliabh Breagh, south of Ardee. One was led out of Connacht by Richard Óg de Burgh, 2nd Earl of Ulster and his ally, the King of Connacht, Felim mac Aedh Ua Conchobair. The second consisted of forces raised in Munster and Leinster by the Justicier Edmund Butler. The Scots-Irish army was located at Inniskeen, ten miles north. In between Sliabh Breagh and Inniskeen was the village of Louth. De Burgh moved his army north of Louth and set up camp while his cousin, William Liath de Burgh attempted to ambush Bruce's forces. While some skirmishing did result in a number of Scots deaths, Bruce refused to give battle and instead, with the Ó Néill, retreated northwards to Coleraine via Armagh. Bruce and Ó Néill sacked and burned Coleraine, threw down the bridge over the river Bann and faced off de Burgh's pursuing army on the opposite bank. While both sides now were experiencing shortages of food and supplies, Bruce and Ó Néill could at least draw support from local lords such as Ó Cathain and Ó Floinn. Mindful of this, de Burgh eventually withdrew back forty miles to Antrim, while Butler had to return to Ormond due to lack of supplies.

In addition to this, Bruce sent separate messages both to King Felim and a rival dynast, Cathal Ua Conchobair, promising to support them if they withdrew. Cathal managed to return to Connacht and had himself proclaimed king, leaving Felim with no choice but to return to put down his rebellion. Worse followed: De Burgh found himself deprived of not two but three allies and their armies when his kinsman, Walter mac Walter Cattach Burke deserted back to Connacht at the head of several hundred men, probably to guard his own estates from the upcoming conflict. Thus, when in August, Bruce and his men crossed the Bann (in four ships supplied by Scots sea captain, Thomas Dun), de Burgh retreated still further to Connor, where on either the first or ninth of September a charge by the Scots-Irish led to his defeat. William Liath was captured and taken as hostage to Scotland by Moray who arrived there on 15 September 1315 to raise more troops, "his ships filled with booty." De Burgh retreated back to Connacht, while other Anglo-Irish took refuge in Carrickfergus Castle.

Finally apprised of the seriousness of the situation, Edward II had on 1 September ordered an assembly of the leading Anglo-Irish, which met at Parliament in Dublin in late October, but no decisive action was taken. On 13 November, Bruce marched further south via Dundalk – where, incredibly, "some gave them the right hand", i.e., a fight – garrisoned Nobber on the 30th, and advanced to Kells, where he was met by Mortimer. Mortimer had managed to raise a large force consisting both of his Anglo-Irish and Gaelic vassals, in addition to forces of other magnates. At the same time, Bruce was reinforced by Moray who had returned from Scotland with around five hundred fresh troops and supplies. The Battle of Kells was fought on the sixth or seventh of November, with Mortimer being decisively defeated by Bruce. Mortimer was forced to retreat to Dublin while his lieutenant, Walter Cusack, held out at Trim. He almost immediately set sail for England to urge Edward II for reinforcements. At the same time, Governor of Ireland (and Bishop of Ely) John de Hothum began to take drastic action to defend Dublin from Bruce, such as levelling entire tenements and churches to use the stones to reinforce their walls.

After sacking and burning Kells, Bruce proceeded to do the same to Granard, Finnea, the Cistercian monastery of Abbeylara and raided Angaile (Annaly), the lordship of Gaelic lord O Hanely. Bruce spent Christmas at de Verdon's manor of Loughsewdy, consuming its supplies entirely and before leaving, razing it to the ground. The only manors left alone belonged to Irish lords intimidated to join him, or that of a junior branch of the de Lacy family who in an effort to gain lands voluntarily joined him.

== Remonstrance of 1317 ==
In 1317, Domhnall Ó Néill, the King of Tyrone, with the support of Edward's Irish allies sent a remonstrance to Pope John XXII asking him to revoke Laudabiliter and mentioning Edward as King of Ireland. Pope John ignored the request.

"And that we may be able to attain our purpose more speedily and fitly in this respect, we call to our help and assistance Edward de Bruyis, illustrious earl of Carrick, brother of Robert by the grace of God most illustrious king of the Scots, who is sprung from our noblest ancestors.

"And as it is free to anyone to renounce his right and transfer it to another, all the right which is publicly known to pertain to us in the said kingdom as its true heirs, we have given and granted to him by our letters patent, and in order that he may do therein judgment and justice and equity which through default of the prince [i.e. Edward II of England] have utterly failed therein, we have unanimously established and set him [Edward Bruce] up as our king and lord in our kingdom aforesaid, for in our judgment and the common judgment of men he is pious and prudent, humble and chaste, exceedingly temperate, in all things sedate and moderate, and possessing power (God on high be praised) to snatch us mightily from the house of bondage with the help of God and our own justice, and very willing to render to everyone what is due to him of right, and above all is ready to restore entirely to the Church in Ireland the possessions and liberties of which she was damnably despoiled, and he intends to grant greater liberties than ever otherwise she has been wont to have".

Similarities exist between the 1317 Remonstrance and the 1320 Declaration of Arbroath have long been evident. The Declaration of Arbroath was likewise sent to Pope John XXII complaining of mistreatment at English hands. Historian Sean Duffy argues that the author of the Declaration relied heavily on the text of the Remonstrance.

== Defeat in 1318 ==
After several years of mobile warfare, Bruce and his allies failed to hold areas that they had conquered. His army fed itself by pillaging, which caused increasing unpopularity. The pan-European Great Famine of 1315–1317 affected Ireland also, and disease became widespread in his army, causing it to shrink, and he was defeated and killed at the end of 1318 at the Battle of Faughart in County Louth.

== Representation in fiction ==
This campaign has sometimes been dealt with briefly or not at all in accounts of the Wars of Scottish Independence, but there are a few exceptions.

The campaign is described in books 14 to 16 of John Barbour's, 1375–1377, epic poem The Brus, for his principle patron, Robert II of Scotland.

In Nigel Tranter's novel The Price of the King's Peace, the third part of his Robert the Bruce trilogy, the campaign, and particularly Robert's visit to Ireland to support his brother, are described at significant length. Edward Bruce is shown as out of his depth during his invasion of Ireland; there may be some truth in this, although the novel could exaggerate his lack of competence and the differences between the two brothers.

The invasion of 1315 also forms the backdrop of a series of novels by Tim Hodkinson, Lions of the Grail and The Waste Land

== Sources ==
- Robert Bruce and the Community of the Realm of Scotland, GWS Barrow, 1976. ISBN 978-0-85224-307-7.
- Annals of Ireland 1162–1370 in Britannia by William Camden; ed. Richard Gough, London, 1789.
- Robert the Bruce's Irish Wars: The Invasions of Ireland 1306–1329, Sean Duffy, 2004.
- The Greatest Traitor: The Life of Sir Roger Mortimer, 1st Earl of March, Ian Mortimer, 2004.
