= Burnt Candlemas =

English military campaign (1356)

Burnt Candlemas English invasion of Scotland (1356)
- Part of the Second War of Scottish Independence
Date	26 January – February 1356
Location	Lothian, Scotland
Result	Lothian sacked and burned

Belligerents
Kingdom of England	Kingdom of Scotland

Commanders and leaders
King Edward III	William, Lord Douglas

Burnt Candlemas was a failed invasion of Scotland in early 1356 by an English army commanded by King Edward III, and was the last campaign of the Second War of Scottish Independence. Tensions on the Anglo-Scottish border led to a military build-up by both sides in 1355. In September a nine-month truce was agreed, and most of the English forces left for northern France to take part in a campaign of the concurrent Hundred Years' War. A few days after agreeing the truce, the Scots, encouraged and subsidised by the French, broke it, invading and devastating Northumberland. In late December the Scots escaladed and captured the important English-held border town of Berwick-on-Tweed and laid siege to its castle. The English army redeployed from France to Newcastle in northern England.

The English advanced to Berwick, retaking the town, and moved to Roxburgh in southern Scotland by mid-January 1356. From there they advanced on Edinburgh, leaving a trail of devastation 50–60 miles (80–100 km) wide behind them. The Scots practised a scorched earth policy, refusing battle and removing or destroying all food in their own territory. The English reached and burnt Edinburgh and were resupplied by sea at Haddington. Edward intended to march on Perth, but contrary winds prevented the movement of the fleet he would need to supply his army. While waiting for a better wind, the English despoiled Lothian so thoroughly that the episode became known as "Burnt Candlemas". This was a reference to the custom of the time of taking one's annual stock of candles to the local church on 2 February to be blessed in a ceremony known as candlemas; they were then used over the rest of the year.

A winter storm drove the English fleet away and scattered it, and the English were forced to withdraw. They did so via Melrose, continuing to devastate Scottish territory, but this time harassed by Scottish forces. The English army was disbanded in Carlisle in late February, and the Scots went on to take two English-held castles. A truce was re-established in April. In 1357 a permanent peace was agreed, largely on English terms.

== Background ==
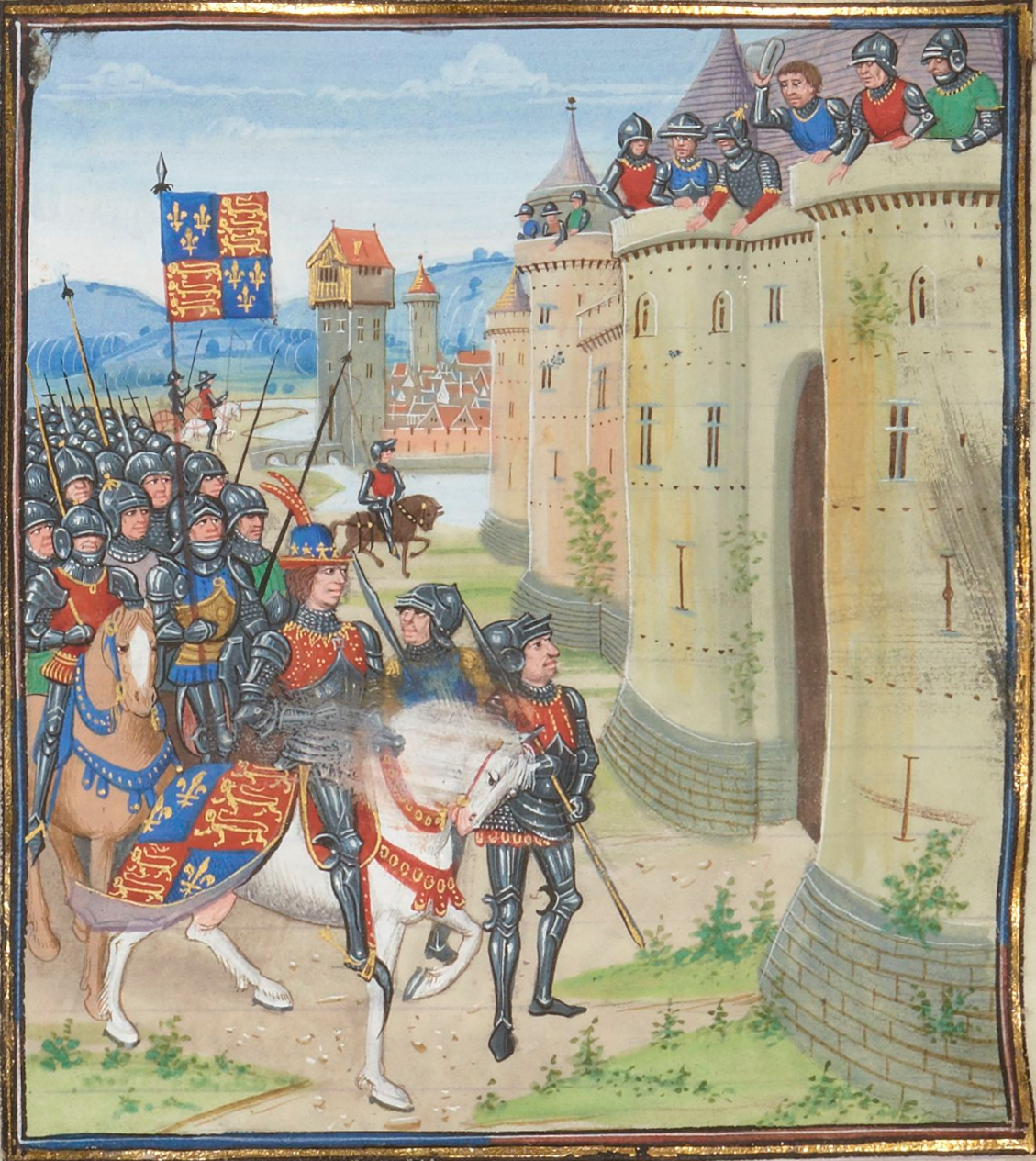
The 1333 Siege of Berwick

The First War of Scottish Independence between England and Scotland began in 1296, when Edward I of England (r. 1272–1307) stormed and sacked the Scottish border town of Berwick-upon-Tweed as a prelude to his invasion of Scotland. Berwick was commercially and militarily the most important town in the border area. More than 32 years of warfare followed, with Berwick being recaptured by the Scots in 1318. The Weardale campaign of 1327 went so badly for the English that it brought Isabella of France and Roger Mortimer, regents of the newly crowned, 14-year-old King Edward III, to the negotiating table. They agreed to the Treaty of Northampton with Robert Bruce (r. 1306–1329) in 1328 recognising Scotland as an independent nation.

Edward was never reconciled to the treaty. In 1332 he backed a rival claimant to the Scottish throne, Edward Balliol, son of King John I of Scotland. By 1333 England and Scotland were formally at war again when Edward besieged Berwick, starting the Second War of Scottish Independence. The Scots felt compelled to attempt to relieve the town. A Scottish army 20,000 strong attacked the 10,000 English and suffered a devastating defeat at the Battle of Halidon Hill. Berwick surrendered the next day.

The Hundred Years' War between England and France commenced in 1337, and in 1346 Edward led an English army across northern France, winning the Battle of Crécy and besieging Calais. Encouraged by the French King, the Scots invaded England with a large army, certain that few English troops would be left to defend the rich northern English cities. The Scots were decisively beaten at the Battle of Neville's Cross and their king, David II, was captured. The Scottish threat receded and the English were able to commit fully to the war with France.

=== Scottish invasion ===
The location of several places mentioned in the text

By 1355 David II was still a prisoner, ransom negotiations having deadlocked several times over the amount of David's ransom, his successor in the event of his childless death, the restoration of several English-supporting Scottish lords, whether David was to do homage to Edward for Scotland and how long any cessation to hostilities was to last before breaking down altogether. At this Scottish nobles, encouraged by the French, started gathering an army on the border. The English mobilised in response. The French sent 50 or 60 men-at-arms under Yon de Garencières to Scotland. They also promised the Scots a large cash payment to be distributed among the elite if they would invade England. When this payment failed to arrive by late September, a nine-month truce was agreed between the English and the Scottish. The English military focus then switched to France: Edward intended to campaign in northern France and his son, the Black Prince, was about to lead an attack in the south west. A large part of the English force subsequently moved south to join Edward's planned campaign. Many members of the garrisons of the English border fortresses left their posts without permission to join the expedition to northern France, including the commander of the Berwick town garrison.

A few days after the Anglo-Scottish truce was signed the French cash, 40,000 gold écus, arrived. Waiting only until the departing English were well on their way, the Scottish reneged on the treaty and invaded Northumberland in northern England. They were probably fewer than 2,000 strong, but there was no English field force to oppose them. The Constable of Norham Castle, a significant English border fortification, attempted to counterattack with part of his garrison and some locals, but this scratch force was routed. The Scots pillaged and burned villages across Northumbria. Edward received the news on 20 October, by which time much of his army was already in France and the balance was embarking. He continued with his campaign in France, where he led a chevauchée – a large-scale mounted raid – across Picardy, attempting to draw the French army into battle. The French evaded, prevaricated and avoided battle.

==== Berwick ====
In late October 1355 the Scottish nobles Thomas, Earl of Angus, and Patrick, Earl of March gathered a small force of Scots and French and boats to transport them in. They escaladed the walls of the town of Berwick shortly before dawn on 6 November. Carrying the walls the Scots then pressed the short-handed garrison back through the town towards the separate fortress of Berwick Castle, where the town garrison and the town's inhabitants took refuge. The Scots looted the town. The castle was already strongly garrisoned and was promptly reinforced by John Coupland, who arrived with part of the English garrison of Roxburgh. The Guardian of Scotland, Robert Stewart, who was acting as regent for the imprisoned David II, took personal control of the siege of the castle.

Meanwhile, the expedition in Picardy was proving inconclusive. Edward attempted to set up an arranged battle, but no agreement could be reached. According to some sources, during these discussions Edward received word of the fall of Berwick town and the siege of the castle; he cut short the negotiations and returned his army to England after receiving the news. According to other accounts it was not until he disembarked in England with the army on 12 November, after the negotiations with the French had failed, that he learnt of the fall of Berwick. In any event, Edward was in Newcastle in the north by Christmas Eve (24 December), where a large army was assembling, and a fleet was being prepared to supply it. The army left Newcastle on 6 January 1356. An advance force under Walter Mauny found Berwick castle was still holding out. Most of the original Scottish assault force had left, leaving a garrison in the town of 130 men, too few to adequately garrison the walls. The English laid siege to the town and the Scots could expect no relief force, according to a contemporary "by reason of the discord of the magnates". Mauny had been accompanied by 120 miners, who tunnelled towards the town walls while Mauny prepared simultaneous land and sea assaults. On 13 January Edward arrived with the main English army. The Scots offered to parley and Edward agreed to let them leave, even allowing them to take with them what plunder they could carry.

== English invasion ==
=== Advance ===
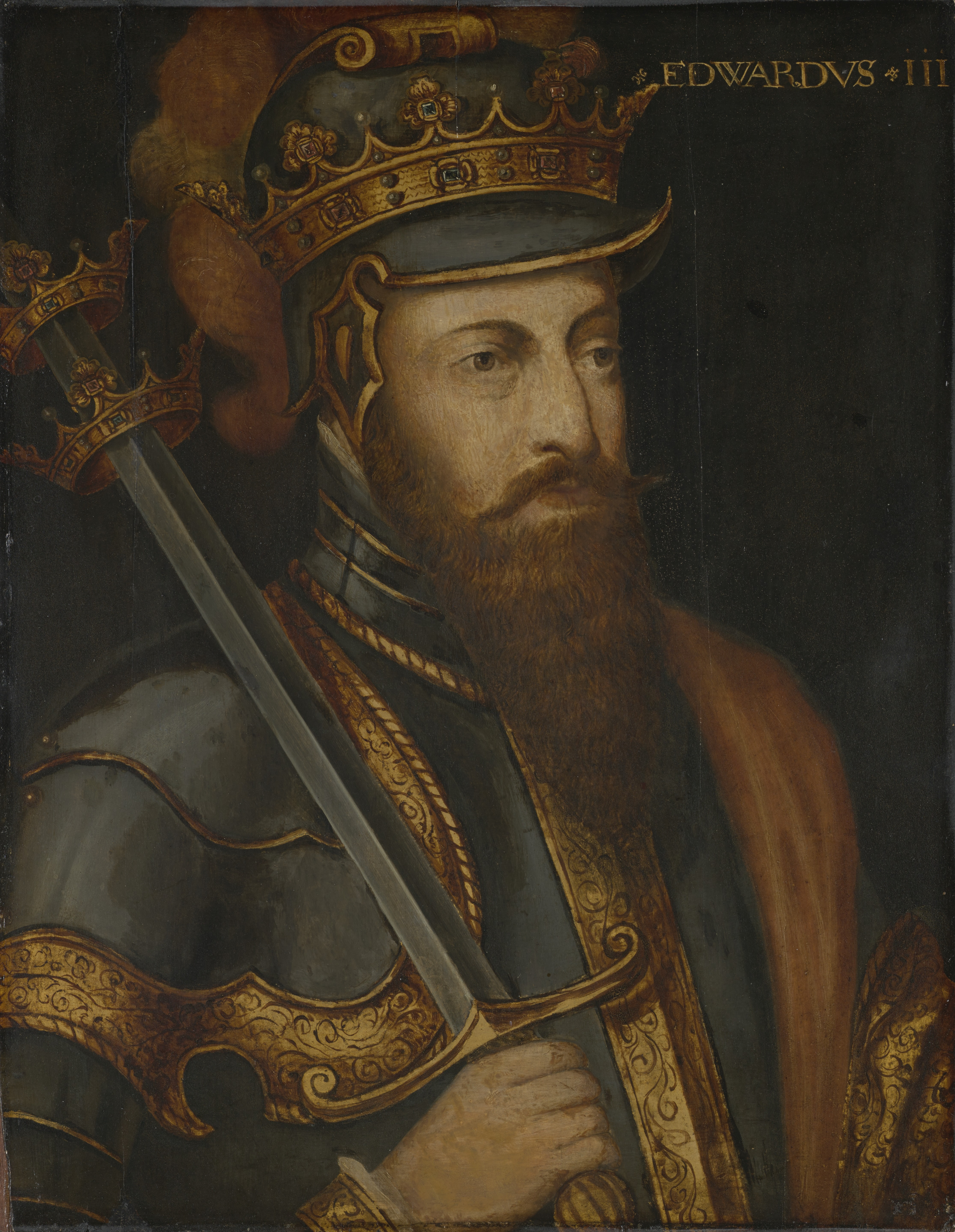
Edward III

Edward moved his army up the River Tweed to Roxburgh by mid-January 1356. On 20 January Balliol surrendered his nominal position as king of Scotland in favour of Edward, his overlord, in exchange for a generous pension. The modern historian Clifford Rogers has suggested this may have been a way for Edward to put pressure on David II, whom Edward held captive and who was widely acknowledged as king of Scotland, to agree ransom terms. The Scots were unimpressed and on 26 January the English army set off towards Edinburgh. The size of the English army is difficult to assess, but it has been described as a "large ... host" and as being possibly 13,000 strong. They divided into three columns and left a trail of devastation 50–60 miles (80–100 km) wide behind them. Much of the territory they were despoiling was part of the estates of Patrick of March, one of the leaders of the Scottish assault on Berwick in defiance of the truce.

The Scots practiced a scorched earth policy, refusing battle, evacuating the populace ahead of the English and devastating their own territory. Foraging generated little food and, unusually for the period, the English soldiers were reduced to drinking water. Arriving at Edinburgh in early February Edward had much of the town burnt and established a camp to the east of it at Haddington. Here the English army was resupplied by the English fleet. Edward's plan was to march on the Scottish capital at Perth via Stirling, perhaps to be crowned King of Scotland at nearby Scone – the traditional place of coronation for Scottish monarchs. On the way, according to the contemporary chronicler John of Fordun, Edward intended "to destroy and ruin Scotland both near and far, and indeed to devastate it utterly."

It was clear the army would require supplying from the sea during this march, but unfavourable north winds prevented the fleet from moving. Edward waited at Haddington for ten days. While waiting for the wind to change Lothian was devastated so thoroughly that the Scots called the English incursion "Burnt Candlemas". This was a reference to the custom of the time of taking one's annual stock of candles to the local church on 2 February to be blessed in a ceremony known as candlemas; they were then used over the rest of the year. In mid-February the wind changed, but blew up into a winter gale which thoroughly scattered the fleet, sinking several ships.

=== Retreat ===
Deprived of sea-borne supplies Edward was forced to abandon his plans and beat a hasty retreat. The English withdrew to the south west, through as-yet-unspoilt lands. They continued to burn and devastate Scottish territory, at least as far south as Melrose. This time Scottish forces, led by William Douglas, Lord of Douglas, harried the English – attacking foragers, stragglers and detachments. Significant losses were inflicted, in addition to the many English losses to the winter weather and lack of food. In late February Edward's troops reached the English border town of Carlisle, where the army was disbanded.

With the English field army gone, previously English-controlled territory and enclaves in Scotland were reclaimed. The strong English-held castles of Caerlaverock and Dalswinton were stormed and captured; Galloway accepted the authority of the Scottish crown. On 18 April a new, partial truce was agreed.

== Aftermath ==
In 1357 terms were agreed for the release of David II. These were very similar to those which the Scots had refused in 1354. David's ransom was the huge sum of 100,000 marks, to be paid over ten years, on 24 June (St. John the Baptist's Day) each year. During these ten years an Anglo-Scottish truce prohibited any Scottish citizen from bearing arms against Edward III or any of his men. This truce stabilised the border area, bringing a measure of peace to it for three decades, and marked the end of the Second War of Scottish Independence.

== Citations and sources ==
=== Sources ===
- Barrow, Geoffrey Wallis Steuart (1965). Robert Bruce and the Community of the Realm of Scotland. London: Eyre and Spottiswoode. OCLC 655056131.
- Blackenstall, Stan (2010). Coastal Castles of Northumberland. Stroud: Amberley. ISBN 978-1-44560-196-0.
- Brown, Michael (2008). Bannockburn. Edinburgh: Edinburgh University Press. ISBN 978-0-7486-3333-3.
- Burne, Alfred (1999) [1955]. The Crecy War. Ware, Hertfordshire: Wordsworth Editions. ISBN 978-1-84022-210-4.
- Given-Wilson, Chris; Bériac, Françoise (September 2001). "Edward III's Prisoners of War: The Battle of Poitiers and its Context". The English Historical Review. 116 (468): 802–833. doi:10.1093/ehr/CXVI.468.802. ISSN 0013-8266.
- Chisholm, Hugh, ed. (1911). "Candlemas" . Encyclopædia Britannica. Vol. 5 (11th ed.). Cambridge University Press. p. 179. OCLC 14004298
- Maxwell, Herbert, ed. (1913). The Chronicle of Lanercost, 1272–1346: Translated, with notes. Glasgow: J. Maclehose and Sons. OCLC 457526322.
- Nicholson, Ranald (1974). Scotland: The Later Middle Ages. University of Edinburgh History of Scotland. Edinburgh: Oliver and Boyd. ISBN 978-0-05002-038-8.
- Ormrod, Mark (1990). The Reign of Edward III. Yale Medieval Monarchs series. New Haven: Yale University Press. ISBN 978-0-300-11910-7.
- Ormrod, Mark (2012). Edward III. Yale Medieval Monarchs series. New Haven: Yale University Press. ISBN 978-0-300-11910-7.
- Penman, Michael (2004). David II. East Linton, East Lothian: Tuckwell Press. ISBN 978-1-86232-202-8.
- Prestwich, Michael (1988). Edward I. Yale Medieval Monarchs series. Berkeley: University of California Press. ISBN 978-0-52006-266-5.
- Rodwell, Warwick (2013). The Coronation Chair and Stone of Scone: History, Archaeology and Conservation. Oxford: Oxbow Books. ISBN 978-1-78297-153-5.
- Rogers, Clifford (2014) [2000]. War Cruel and Sharp: English Strategy under Edward III, 1327–1360. Woodbridge, Suffolk: Boydell Press. ISBN 978-0-85115-804-4.
- Sumption, Jonathan (1990). Trial by Battle. The Hundred Years' War. Vol. I. London: Faber and Faber. ISBN 978-0-57120-095-5.
- Sumption, Jonathan (1999). Trial by Fire. The Hundred Years War. Vol. II. London: Faber and Faber. ISBN 978-0-571-13896-8.
- Tuck, Anthony (2002). "A Medieval Tax Haven: Berwick upon Tweed and the English Crown, 1333–1461". In Britnel, Richard; Hatcher, John (eds.). Progress and Problems in Medieval England: Essays in Honour of Edward Miller. Cambridge: Cambridge University Press. pp. 148–167. ISBN 978-0-52152-273-1.
- Wagner, John A. (2006a). "Chevauchée of 1355". Encyclopedia of the Hundred Years War. Woodbridge, Suffolk: Greenwood. pp. 95–96. ISBN 978-0-313-32736-0.
- Wagner, John A. (2006b). "Chronology: The Hundred Years War". Encyclopedia of the Hundred Years War. Woodbridge, Suffolk: Greenwood. pp. xxix–l. ISBN 978-0-313-32736-0.
