= 1355 =

1355 in various calendars
- Gregorian calendar: 1355; MCCCLV
- Ab urbe condita: 2108
- Armenian calendar: 804; ԹՎ ՊԴ
- Assyrian calendar: 6105
- Balinese saka calendar: 1276–1277
- Bengali calendar: 761–762
- Berber calendar: 2305
- English Regnal year: 28 Edw. 3 – 29 Edw. 3
- Buddhist calendar: 1899
- Burmese calendar: 717
- Byzantine calendar: 6863–6864
- Chinese calendar: 甲午年 (Wood Horse); 4052 or 3845 — to — 乙未年 (Wood Goat); 4053 or 3846
- Coptic calendar: 1071–1072
- Discordian calendar: 2521
- Ethiopian calendar: 1347–1348
- Hebrew calendar: 5115–5116
- Hindu calendars
- Vikram Samvat: 1411–1412
- Shaka Samvat: 1276–1277
- Kali Yuga: 4455–4456
- Holocene calendar: 11355
- Igbo calendar: 355–356
- Iranian calendar: 733–734
- Islamic calendar: 755–756
- Japanese calendar: Bunna 4 (文和４年)
- Javanese calendar: 1267–1268
- Julian calendar: 1355; MCCCLV
- Korean calendar: 3688
- Minguo calendar: 557 before ROC 民前557年
- Nanakshahi calendar: −113
- Thai solar calendar: 1897–1898
- Tibetan calendar: ཤིང་ཕོ་རྟ་ལོ་ (male Wood-Horse); 1481 or 1100 or 328 — to — ཤིང་མོ་ལུག་ལོ་ (female Wood-Sheep); 1482 or 1101 or 329

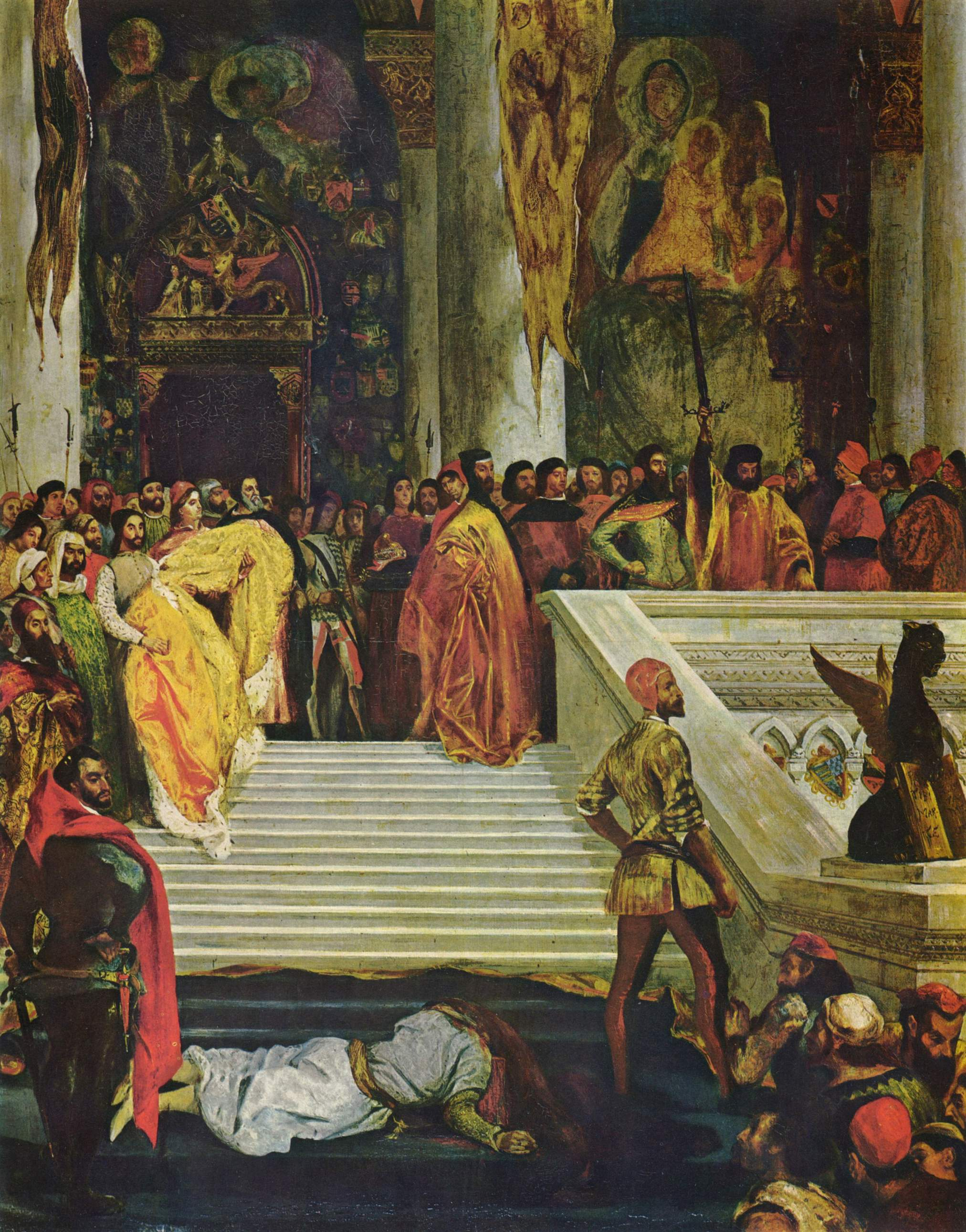
April 17: Leader of the Republic of Venice, the Doge Marino Faliero, is executed after plotting to murder his council. (Painting by Eugène Delacroix in 1827)

Year 1355 (MCCCLV) was a common year starting on Thursday of the Julian calendar.

== January–March ==
- January 6 – The coronation of Charles IV of Bohemia as "King of Italy" takes place in Milan as the Iron Crown of Lombardy is placed upon his head.
- January 7 – King Afonso IV of Portugal sends three men who kill Inês de Castro, mistress of his son Pedro, who revolts and incites a civil war.
- February 10 – St Scholastica Day riot in Oxford, England, breaks out, leaving 63 scholars and perhaps 30 locals dead in two days.
- March 16 – Red Turban Rebellions: Han Lin'er, a claimed descendant of Emperor Huizong of Song, is proclaimed emperor of the restored Song dynasty in Bozhou.

== April–June ==
- April 5 – Charles IV is crowned Holy Roman Emperor in Rome.
- April 17 – In the Republic of Venice, the Council of Ten, led by the new Doge, Giovanni Gradenigo, carries out the beheading the former Doge Marino Faliero, for conspiring to have them killed. them.
- April – Philip II, Prince of Taranto, marries Maria of Calabria, daughter of Charles, Duke of Calabria, and Marie of Valois.
- May 7 – A mob in the Castilian city of Toledo, led by Fadrique Alfonso and Prince Enrique, half-brothers of King Pedro I, carries out the massacre of approximately 1,200 Jewish residents of the Juderia, the Jewish quarter of the city.
- May 31 – Jacques de Bourbon, Constable of France, persuades King Jean II of Kingdom of France to pardon King Carlos II of Navarre in order to avert a war with Navarre and England. By the time King Jean's orders reach the Navarrese capital, Pamplona, King Carlos and his army are en route to conquer the French territory of Normandy.
- May – Red Turban Rebellions: Guo Zixing dies, leaving his forces to the command of his son-in-law, Zhu Yuanzhang. Guo's successors are later killed in battle while trying to capture Nanjing.
- June 1 – The War of the Straits, between the Republic of Venice and the Republic of Genoa, ends as Venice's Doge Giovanni Gradenigo and Genoa's Doge Simone Boccanegra sign a treaty, with Genoa being liberated from control of Milan's Visconti family.
- June 4 – News reaches Paris that Navarre and England are on their way to invade and conquer Normandy, and France prepares to defend its territory. At the same time, King Jean II dispatches Count Jacques of Le Marche and two other negotiators to travel to Cherbourg before King Carlos II of Navarre arrives.
- June 20 – Pope Innocent VI approves a treaty between Rodolfo II da Varano, condottiero of the Varano rulers of Macerata, and Galeotto de' Malatesta, lord of Rimini, after Galeotto has been taken prisoner by Rodolfo.

== July–September ==
- July 5 – King Carlos II of Navarre and his troops arrive at Cherbourg, prepared to invade Normandy, but French peace negotiators are waiting to meet the Navarrese king and make plans to avert the war.
- July 11 – (28 Jumada II 756 AH) Abd Allah ibn Abd al-Rahman ibn Aqil is appointed as the chief judge (Qadi) of Sharia law in Mamluk Egypt by the Emir Ṣarghitmish, but serves for only 80 days before Ṣarghitmish is ousted in a coup on September 29.
- August 17 – The Bulgarian Orthodox Church, which had broken relations with the Eastern Orthodox Patriarch Philotheos in Constantinople, enters a reconciliation with the Eastern Orthodox Christians after Callistos is appointed by the Byzantine Emperor as the new Eastern Pattriarch.
- August 18 – Magnus Eriksson, king of Sweden and Norway, abdicates his Norwegian throne and his son, Haakon VI becomes king of Norway.
- August 23 – With the printing press not yet available in Europe, Pope Innocent VI orders clerics at the ecclesaistical chanceries to make 568 handwritten broadsheets by copying an original handwritten papal decree (and subsequent copies) for redistribution.
- August –
  - At the Battle of Nesbit Moor, the Scottish army decisively defeats the English.
- September 1 – The old town of Visoki is first mentioned in Tvrtko I of Bosnia's charter in castro nostro Vizoka vocatum.
- September 10 – The Treaty of Valognes is signed and sealed by the kingdoms of Navarre and France and war between the two nations is averted and Navarre ends plans to ally with England.
- September 20 – King Edward III summons the Parliament of England and directs the members to assemble on November 23.
- September 24 – The Dauphin Charles, heir to the throne of France and eldest son of King Jean II, averts war with the Spanish kingdom of Navarre and its ruler, King Carlos II, who had at one time pledged to aid England's King Edward III in the conquest of Normandy.

== October–December ==
- October 5 – Hundred Years' War: The chevauchée of Edward the Black Prince begins as Prince Edward, the son of England's King Edward III, leads a large force of England and Gascony forces on march from Bordeaux in English-held Gascony toward Narbonne in a destructive campaign.
- October 28 – As France prepares for a siege of the French city of Toulouse by England, the Black Prince leads his English troops and cavalry across the Ariège river, but postpones the siege.
- November 2 – King Edward III of England begins a military campaign in the region of Picardy in the northern part of the Kingdom of France, in hopes of provoking a response by France's King Jean II. The nine-day campaign, which ends on November 11, takes place while the King's son, Edward the Black Prince, is marching through Gascony for the same purpose.
- November 6 – Second War of Scottish Independence: Scottish troops, led by Thomas Stewart, 2nd Earl of Angus and Patrick V, Earl of March, make a surprise attack on the town of Berwick-upon-Tweed in England but fail to capture the Ogle Castle as Sir Robert de Ogle leads a defense and holds the fort until other English troops arrive and drive out the Scots.
- November 8 – The Black Prince and the English invaders capture the French city of Narbonne.
- November 12 – King Edward III of England ends his campaign in France and arrives with his troops at Calais in order to cross the English Channel back to England.
- November 20 – At Vijayanagara (now a set of ruins near the town of Hampi in India's Karnataka state), the Emperor Harihara, ruler of India's Vijayanagara Empire, dies after a reign of 19 years, and is succeeded by his brother Bukka Raya.
- November 23 – The English Parliament assembles at Westminster for and 8-day session.
- November 30 – The English Parliament closes without a record of any legislation passed. Parliament does not meet again until 1357.
- December 2 – The Black Prince and his Anglo-Gascon force return to Bordeaux after having destroyed French property in the 300 miles (480 km) route between Bordeaux and Narbonne.
- December 7 – The Dauphin Charles of France is proclaimed as Duke of Normandy by his father, King Jean II, ending tensions between father and son and thwarting a plot by Charles V, Holy Roman Emperor, to ally with the Dauphin.
- Date unknown – Battle of Ihtiman: The Ottoman Turks defeat the Bulgarian Empire but suffer heavy losses and do not return to Bulgarian territory for around 15 years.

== Births ==
- January 7 – Thomas of Woodstock, Duke of Gloucester, son of King Edward III of England (d. 1397)
- August 16 – Philippa Plantagenet, Countess of Ulster (d. 1382)
- October 10 – Zhu Biao, eldest son of the Hongwu Emperor and crown prince of the Ming dynasty (d. 1392)
- probable
  - Acamapichtli, 1st tlatoani (monarch) of Tenochtitlan (modern Mexico City), 1375-1395 (d. 1395)
  - Manuel Chrysoloras, Byzantine humanist (d. 1415)
  - Konrad von Jungingen, German 25th Grand Master of the Teutonic Order
  - Gemistus Pletho, Greek scholar
  - Foelke Kampana, Frisian lady and regent (d. 1418)
  - Mircea the Elder, Voivode of Wallachia (d. 1418)

== Deaths ==
- January 7 – Inês de Castro, lover of King Peter I of Portugal (murdered) (b. 1325)
- April 17 – Marin Falier, Doge of Venice (b. 1285)
- April 22 – Eleanor of Woodstock, countess regent of Guelders, eldest daughter of King Edward II of England (b. 1318)
- May – Guo Zixing, Chinese Red Turban rebel leader
- August 3 – Bartholomew de Burghersh, 1st Baron Burghersh
- October 16 – Louis of Sicily
- December 5 – John III, Duke of Brabant (b. 1300)
- December 20 – Stefan Dušan, Emperor of Serbia
- date unknown – Bettina d'Andrea, Italian lawyer and professor
