= Second War of Scottish Independence =

1332–1357 war between Scotland and England

Second War of Scottish Independence Anglo-Scottish War of Succession
- Part of the Wars of Scottish Independence and the Hundred Years' War
| Date | 6 August 1332 – 3 October 1357 (25 years, 1 month, 28 days) |
| Location | Scotland and England |
| Result | Scottish victory |

Belligerents
| Kingdom of Scotland | Kingdom of England |

Commanders and leaders
| King David II; Earl of Mar †; Andrew Murray; Archibald Douglas †; Robert Stewart | Edward III; Edward Balliol |

The Second War of Scottish Independence broke out in 1332, when Edward Balliol led an English-backed invasion of Scotland. Balliol, the son of former Scottish king John Balliol, was attempting to make good his claim to the Scottish throne. He was opposed by Scots loyal to the occupant of the throne, eight-year-old David II. At the Battle of Dupplin Moor Balliol's force defeated a Scottish army ten times their size and Balliol was crowned king. Within three months David's partisans had regrouped and forced Balliol out of Scotland. He appealed to the English king, Edward III, who invaded Scotland in 1333 and besieged the important trading town of Berwick. A large Scottish army attempted to relieve it but was heavily defeated at the Battle of Halidon Hill. Balliol established his authority over most of Scotland, ceded to England the eight counties of south-east Scotland and did homage to Edward for the rest of the country as a fief.

As allies of Scotland via the Auld Alliance, the French were unhappy about an English expansion into Scotland and so covertly supported and financed David's loyalists. Balliol's allies fell out among themselves and he lost control of most of Scotland again by late 1334. In early 1335, the French attempted to broker a peace. However, the Scots were unable to agree on a position and Edward prevaricated while building a large army. He invaded in July and again overran most of Scotland. Tensions with France increased. Further French-sponsored peace talks failed in 1336; in May 1337, King Philip VI of France engineered a clear break between France and England, starting the Hundred Years' War. The Anglo-Scottish war became a subsidiary theatre of this larger Anglo-French war. Edward sent what troops he could spare to Scotland, in spite of which the English slowly lost ground in Scotland as they were forced to focus on the French theatre. Achieving his majority, David returned to Scotland from France in 1341; by 1342, the English had been cleared from north of the border.

In 1346, Edward led a large English army through northern France, sacking Caen, heavily defeating the French at Crécy and besieging Calais. In response to Philip's urgent requests, David invaded England believing most of its previous defenders were in France. He was surprised by a smaller but nonetheless sizable English force, which crushed the Scots at the Battle of Neville's Cross and captured David. This, and the resulting factional politics in Scotland, prevented further large-scale Scottish attacks. A concentration on France similarly kept the English quiescent, while possible terms for David's release were discussed at length. In late 1355, a large Scottish raid into England, in breach of truce, provoked another invasion from Edward in early 1356. The English devastated Lothian but winter storms scattered their supply ships and they retreated. The following year the Treaty of Berwick was signed, which ended the war; the English dropped their claim of suzerainty, while the Scots acknowledged a vague English overlordship. A cash ransom was negotiated for David's release: 100,000 marks, to be paid over ten years. The treaty prohibited any Scottish citizen from bearing arms against Edward III or any of his men until the sum was paid in full and the English were supposed to stop attacking Scotland. This effectively ended the war, and while intermittent fighting continued, the truce was broadly observed for forty years.

== Background ==
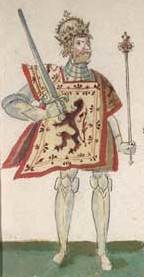
Robert Bruce, from the 1562 Forman Armorial

The First War of Scottish Independence between England and Scotland began in March 1296, when Edward I of England (r. 1272–1307) stormed and sacked the Scottish border town of Berwick as a prelude to his invasion of Scotland. The Scottish king, John I (r. 1292–1296), was captured by the English and forced to abdicate. Subsequent events went less well for the English and by 1323 Robert Bruce (r. 1306–1329) was securely on the Scottish throne and had carried out several major raids deep into England, leading to the signing in May of a 13-year truce. Despite this, Scottish raids continued, as did English piracy against Scottish shipping. After the newly crowned 14-year-old King Edward III was nearly captured by the Scots in the English disaster at Stanhope Park in 1327, his regents, his mother Isabella of France and her lover Roger Mortimer, were forced to the negotiating table. They agreed to the Treaty of Northampton with Bruce in 1328, recognising him as king of an independent Scotland and ending the war after 32 years. To further seal the peace, Robert's very young son and heir David married Joan, the likewise youthful sister of Edward.

The treaty was widely resented in England and commonly known as the turpis pax, "the shameful peace". The 15-year-old Edward was forced into signing the treaty by his regents and was never reconciled to it. Some Scottish nobles, refusing to swear fealty to Bruce, were disinherited and left Scotland to join forces with Edward Balliol, the eldest son of King John. Robert Bruce died in 1329 and his heir was 5-year-old David II (r. 1329–1371). In 1330, Edward seized Mortimer and had him executed, confined his mother, and established his personal rule.

== English aggression ==
=== English invasion of Scotland, 1332 ===
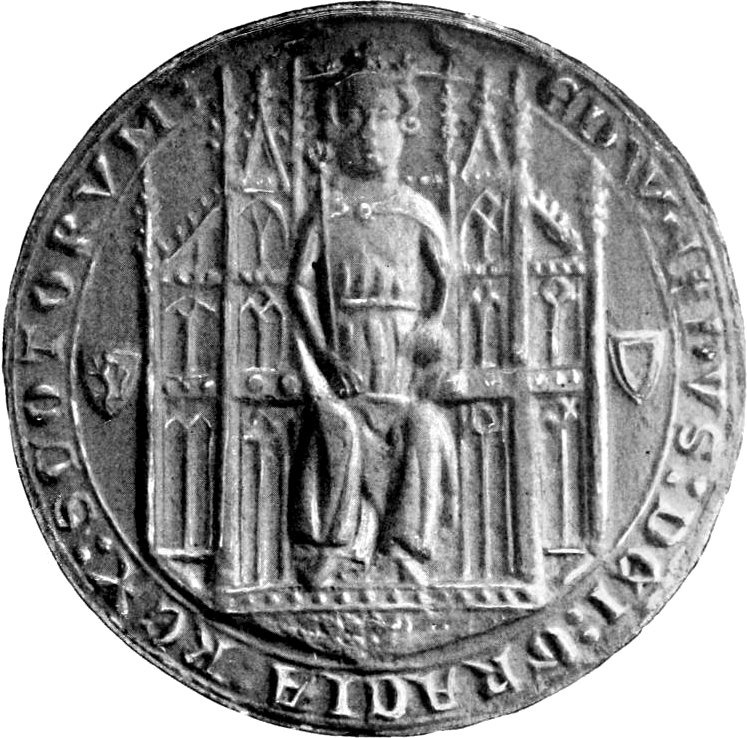
Balliol's royal seal

In 1331, under the leadership of Edward Balliol and Henry Beaumont, Earl of Buchan, the disinherited Scottish nobles gathered in Yorkshire to plot an invasion of Scotland. Edward III was aware of the scheme and officially forbade it. The reality was different, as he was happy to cause trouble for his northern neighbour. He prohibited Balliol from invading overland from England, but overlooked his forces sailing for Scotland from Yorkshire ports on 31 July 1332. David II's regent, with the title of guardian of Scotland, was an experienced old soldier, Thomas Randolph, Earl of Moray. Moray was aware of the situation and was waiting for Balliol and Beaumont, but died ten days before they sailed.

Balliol landed in Fife on 6 August with a predominately English force of some 2,000 men. There he immediately encountered fierce Scottish opposition, which he overcame at the Battle of Kinghorn. Five days later he met the 15,000–40,000 strong Scottish army under the new guardian Donald, Earl of Mar, 2 miles (3 km) south of the Scottish capital, Perth. The invaders crossed the River Earn at night via an unguarded ford and took up a strong defensive position. Next morning, in the Battle of Dupplin Moor, the Scots raced to attack the English, disorganising their own formations. Unable to break the line of English men-at-arms, the Scots became trapped in a valley with fresh forces arriving from the rear pressing them forward and giving them no room to manoeuvre, or even to use their weapons. English longbowmen fired into both Scottish flanks. Many Scots died of suffocation or were trampled underfoot. Eventually they broke and the English men-at-arms mounted and pursued the fugitives until nightfall. Thousands of Scots died, including Mar and much of the nobility of the realm, and Perth fell.

This marked the start of the Second War of Scottish Independence. On 24 September 1332 Balliol was crowned king of Scotland at Scone, the traditional place of coronation for Scottish monarchs. Almost immediately, Balliol granted Edward Scottish estates to a value of £2,000, which included "the town, castle and county of Berwick". Balliol's support within Scotland was limited and he was subject to constant military challenge; for example, on 7 October David's partisans recaptured Perth and destroyed its walls. On 16 December, less than three months after his coronation, Balliol was ambushed by supporters of David II at the Battle of Annan. He fled to England half-dressed and riding bareback. He appealed to Edward for assistance, who dropped all pretence of neutrality, recognised Balliol as king of Scotland and made ready for war.

=== English invasion of Scotland, 1333 ===
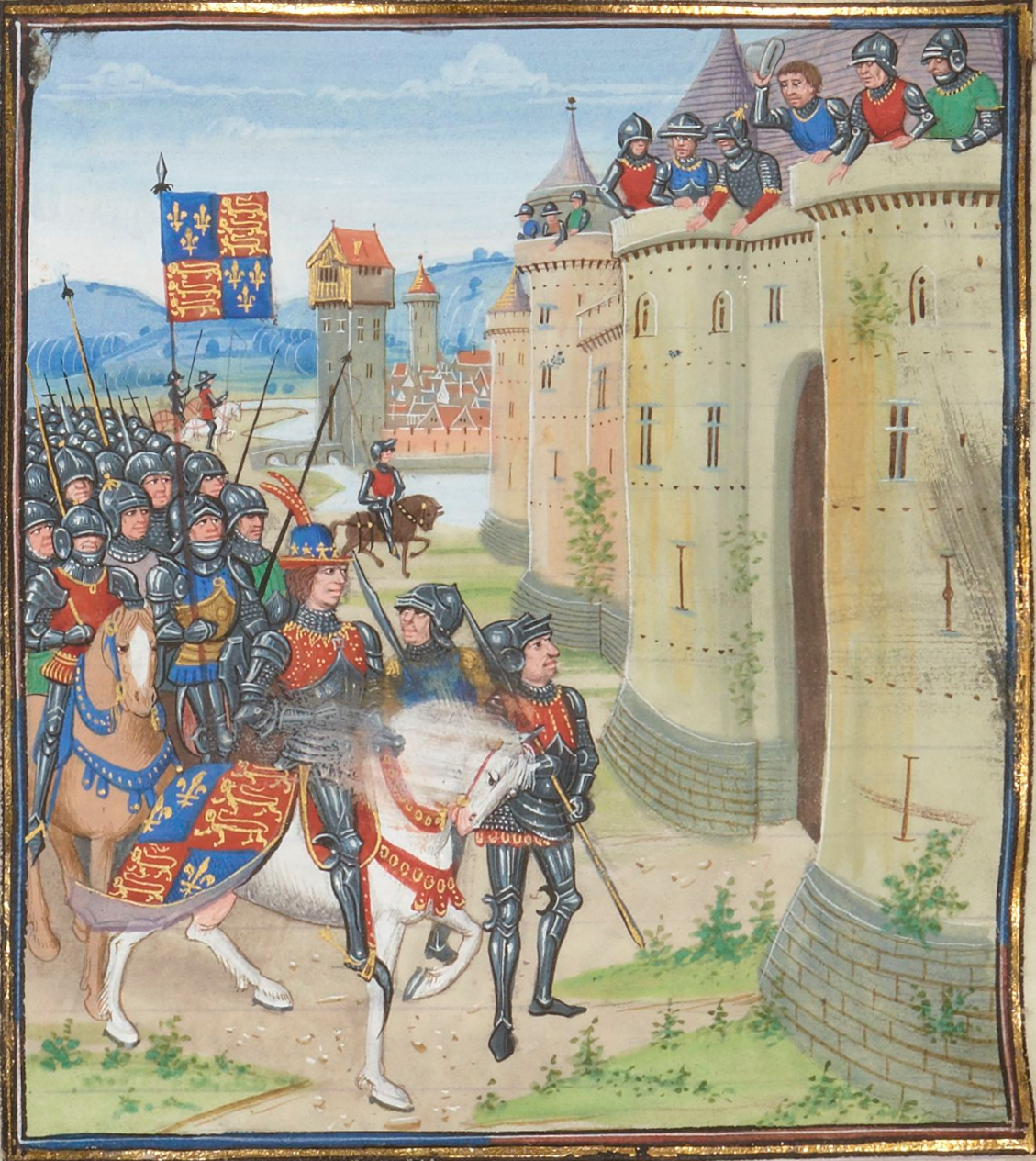
A 14th century depiction of the 1333 Siege of Berwick

Although the idea of returning to war against Scotland did not have universal appeal among the English, Edward III gave Balliol his backing. The Scots launched minor raids into Cumberland, which achieved little. Edward invaded Scotland, claiming that this was a response to the raids. His chosen target was Berwick, on the Anglo-Scottish border astride the main invasion and trade route in either direction. According to a contemporary chronicle, Berwick was "so populous and of such trade that it might justly be called another Alexandria, whose riches were the sea and the waters its walls". It was the most successful trading town in Scotland; the duty on wool which passed through it was the Scottish Crown's largest single source of income. Edward hoped the possibility of losing it would draw the Scots into a set-piece battle, which he believed he would win. During centuries of war between the two nations, battles had been rare as the Scots preferred guerrilla tactics and border raids into England. Berwick was one of the few targets which might bring the Scots to battle as, in the words of the historian Clifford Rogers, "abandoning it was almost unthinkable".

Balliol opened the siege of Berwick in late March 1333, and was joined by Edward with the main English army on 9 May. Berwick was well defended, well garrisoned and well stocked with provisions and materiel, but the English pressed the siege hard and by the end of June attacks by land and sea had brought Berwick to a state of ruin and the garrison close to exhaustion. (Note: The Brut Chronicle remarks that the English "made meny assautes with gonnes and with othere engynes to the toune, wherwith thai destroiede meny a fair hous; and cherches also were beten adoune unto the erthe, with gret stones, and spitouse comyng out of gonnes and of othere gynnes." Later petitions from the town to the King also mention churches and houses having been "cast down" during the siege.) A truce was arranged on 15 July, whereby the Scots promised to surrender if not relieved by sunset on 19 July. By this time the Scottish army under the third Scottish guardian within a year, Sir Archibald Douglas, had crossed the border and was devastating north-east England, but Edward ignored this. Douglas felt his only option was to engage the English in battle.

Douglas ordered an attack. To engage the English, the Scots had to advance downhill, cross a large area of marshy ground and climb the northern slope of Halidon Hill. The Lanercost Chronicle reports:

. . . the Scots who marched in the front were so wounded in the face and blinded by the multitude of English arrows that they could not help themselves, and soon began to turn their faces away from the blows of the arrows and fall.

The Scots suffered many casualties and the lower reaches of the hill were littered with dead and wounded. The survivors continued upwards, through the arrows "as thick as motes in a sun beam", according to an unnamed contemporary quoted by Ranald Nicholson, and on to the waiting spears. The Scottish army broke, the camp followers made off with the horses and the fugitives were pursued by the mounted English knights. The Scottish casualties numbered in thousands, including Douglas and five earls dead on the field. Scots who surrendered were killed on Edward's orders and some drowned as they fled into the sea. English casualties were reported as fourteen, some chronicles give a lower figure of seven. About a hundred Scots who had been taken prisoner were beheaded the next morning, 20 July. This was the date that Berwick's truce expired, and it surrendered.

=== Scottish resurgence, 1334 ===
Territory ceded to England by Edward Balliol (Note: Based on Sumption.) Scottish territory not claimed by England ceded Scottish territory England Orkney and Shetland (under Norwegian rule)

In May 1334 David fled Scotland, taking refuge in France at the invitation of its king, Philip VI. On 19 June Balliol did homage to Edward for Scotland, after formally ceding to England the eight counties of south-east Scotland. Balliol ruled the truncated Scottish state from Perth and attempted to put down the remaining resistance. The invaders' common goal was seemingly attained, with David's partisans holding only five fortifications in all of Scotland. But Balliol's allies fell out among themselves, which in turn encouraged David's supporters. Balliol's divided allies proved easier targets and were captured, forced out of Scotland or switched sides. The French, unhappy about an English expansion into Scotland, covertly supported and financed the Bruce loyalists, although from when is unclear. (Note: The earliest definite confirmation of the French providing supplies to the Scots dates to early February 1335) Balliol retreated to Berwick where he persuaded Edward to spend the winter of 1334–1335 in Roxburgh. Both led excursions into the surrounding western lowlands, destroying the property of friend and foe alike, but found no Scottish troops, while more of Balliol's former supporters defected to the Bruce faction. The leading pro-Bruce nobles formally appealed to Philip for military assistance.

=== French involvement ===
Since the Norman Conquest of 1066, English monarchs had held titles and lands within France, the possession of which made them vassals of the kings of France. The status of the English king's French fiefs was a major source of conflict between the two monarchies throughout the Middle Ages. French monarchs systematically sought to check the growth of English power, stripping away lands as the opportunity arose. Over the centuries, English holdings in France had varied in size, but by 1334 only Gascony in south-western France and Ponthieu in northern France were left. Gascony was important to Edward; the duty levied by the English Crown on wine from there was more than all other customs duties combined and by far the largest source of state income. In 1320, Edward, in his capacity as Duke of Aquitaine, paid homage to Philip for Gascony.

France already had an alliance with Scotland: a mutual defence pact signed in 1295 and renewed in 1326 known as the "Auld Alliance". It was intended to deter England from attacking either country by the threat that the other would in turn invade English territory. In 1331, after six years of often acrimonious negotiations, Edward and Philip had settled most of the differences between them in a formal agreement. Once this was in place Philip had begun arrangements for a crusade to the Holy Land, for which he would need at least English acquiescence and ideally active support.

In early 1335, Philip sent an ambassador to England, who met Edward in Newcastle on 18 February and questioned the basis of Edward's aggression against Scotland. Edward prevaricated but permitted the ambassador to attempt to negotiate a peaceful settlement. A truce was agreed, to last until mid-1335. The senior Scottish nobility fell out and could not agree on a position for the peace negotiations, while Edward seems to have been happy to use the episode as an opportunity to rebuild his finances and reassemble an army.

=== English invasion of Scotland, 1335–1336 ===
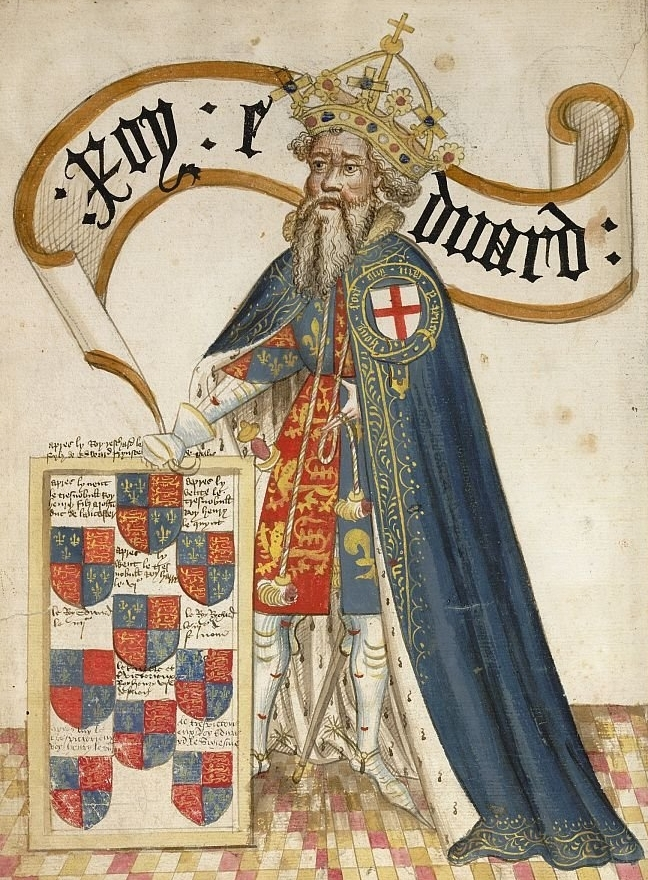
Edward III as head of the Order of the Garter, drawing c. 1430–40 in the Bruges Garter Book

During the spring of 1335 Edward assembled an army of more than 13,000 men on the Scottish border, the largest force he ever led against the Scots, timing his invasion to the expiration of the truce. Aware of his plans, Bruce loyalists were also preparing for war, setting aside their personal differences and evacuating the Central Lowlands in preparation for invasion. In July Edward led part of his force north from Carlisle to Glasgow. There he joined up with the balance, who had marched from Berwick under Balliol, at the end of the month. The Scots followed a scorched earth policy of offering no resistance and both English armies devastated everything in their paths. The combined force marched north to occupy the Scottish capital, Perth. It continued to loot and devastate widely, in the hope of forcing the Scots to battle.

The French, exasperated, assembled an army of 6,000 men to send to Scotland to restore David II and started to interfere in English possessions in France, even threatening to confiscate them. Scottish and French ships sailing out of French ports attacked English ships in the English Channel and raided settlements on the English south coast. Philip wrote to Edward asking him to submit the rival claims on the Scottish throne to arbitration by Pope Benedict XII to avoid an Anglo-French war. Edward refused. In Scotland, Edward and the Scots agreed a truce, to last from mid-October to 3 May 1336; this did not cover Balliol's forces and allowed the Bruce faction to concentrate against Balliol's supporters. On 30 November (Note: Saint Andrew's day; Saint Andrew is the patron saint of Scotland.) Sir Andrew Murray led 1,100 Bruce loyalists against a larger pro-Balliol force commanded by David Strathbogie in the Battle of Culblean, defeating it and killing Strathbogie. It was the first of several victories against Balliol and his followers, which raised Scottish morale and reduced Balliol to complete reliance on English arms.

Philip was persuaded by the Pope to postpone any military action against England, partly to salvage the possibility of a crusade, but in March 1336 Philip persuaded David II to reject a peace treaty, which Murray, who had been appointed regent and guardian of Scotland, was prepared to accept. Philip, in turn, committed himself to restoring David to the Scottish throne. The French assembled more than 500 ships in Normandy with which they planned to transport one army to Scotland and land another at Portsmouth. While Edward spent the spring raising funds for the Scottish war and making arrangements to guard the English south coast, his subordinates further north struck repeatedly against the Scots. The Scots mostly avoided battle and were defeated when they tried to stand. They again practised a scorched earth policy, including razing Perth. Informed of the planned French descent on Scotland, Edward rode rapidly north, joining Balliol in Perth on 28 June. When the French failed to arrive Edward led 800 men out in mid-July, relieved the siege of Lochindorb, 100 miles (160 km) north of Perth and devastated the east coast of Scotland between the Firth of Tay and the Moray Firth. Forres and Aberdeen were razed; the latter was a potential port of disembarkation for any French expeditionary force. Murray continued to avoid battle.

== France joins the fight ==
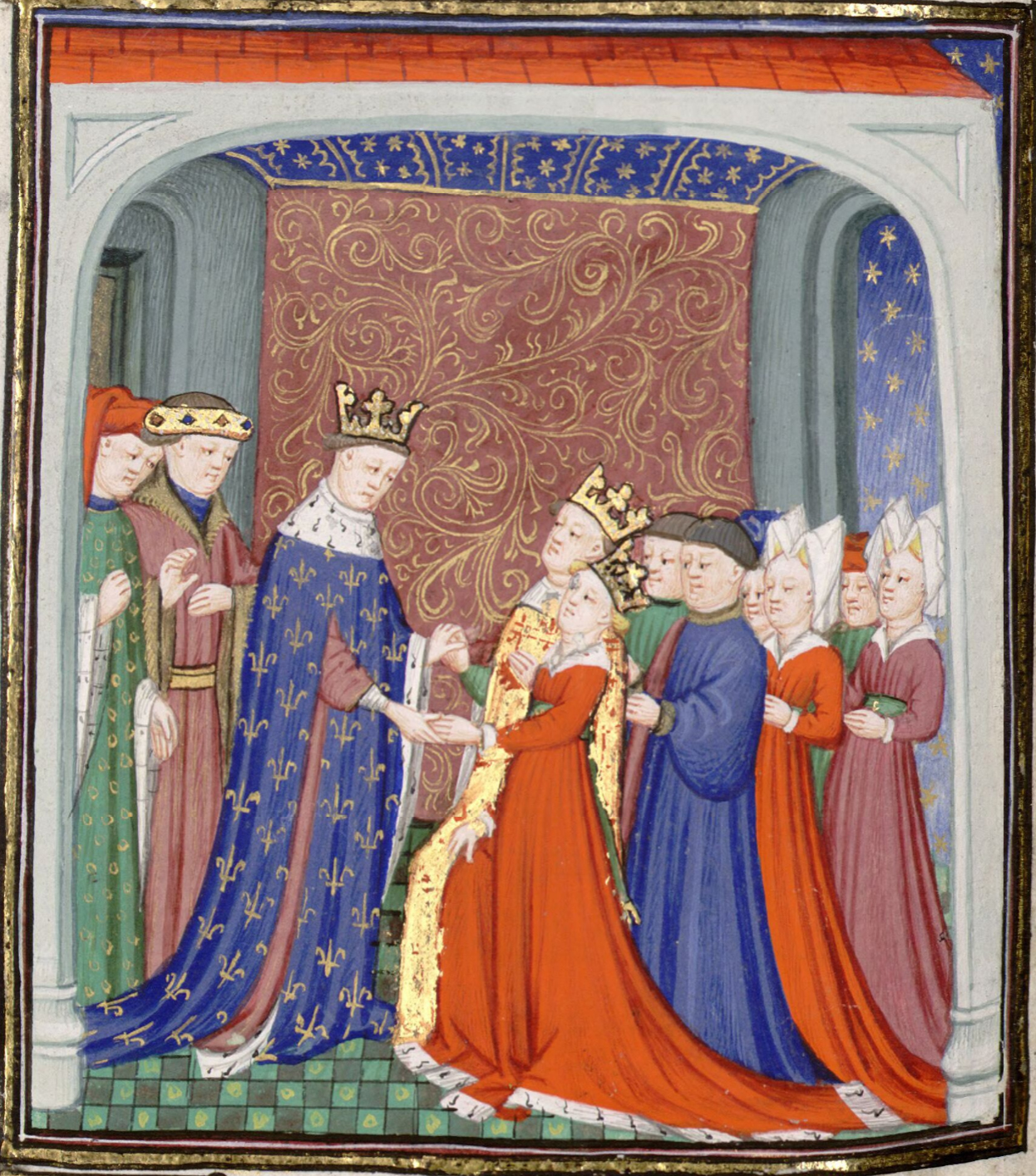
Philip VI receiving David II and Joan, from a 15th century manuscript

During the summer of 1336 an English embassy attempted to negotiate with Philip and David. On 20 August Philip rejected the English proposals and pledged full military support for David's partisans. French privateers immediately began a fresh round of attacks on English shipping and ports, causing panic along the English south coast. It was the middle of September before Edward received the news and returned to England. Arriving too late to strike at the French ships, he imposed new war taxes and returned to Scotland to winter in a fortress on the Clyde. The Scots kept up a campaign of harassment against the English, while Murray destroyed Dunnottar, Kinneff and Lauriston to prevent Edward using them. Famine and disease were widespread throughout Scotland. Political and legal pressure from the French increased and Philip readied his army to invade Gascony in 1337. Edward returned to England again in December 1336 to plan for a war with France in the spring. Papal attempts to mediate were brushed aside.

From early 1337 Bruce loyalists took advantage of the English distraction in France. Murray and Sir William Douglas invaded Fife. Edward believed the French were the greater threat and so was unable to send reinforcements. The local English commanders did little with the resources they had. By early summer northern Scotland had been overrun and most of the English fortifications there were slighted (destroyed). In April another Scottish army invaded Balliol-held Galloway and devastated it. On 24 May 1337 Philip's Great Council ruled that Gascony and Ponthieu should be taken back into Philip's hands on the grounds that Edward was in breach of his obligations as a vassal. This marked the start of the Hundred Years' War, which was to last 116 years. As the year went on the Scots raided into the Lowlands, besieging Edinburgh Castle in November and even attacked Carlisle in England and devastated Cumberland. Despite the pressing need for troops with which to face the French Edward sent further forces to Scotland, although to little effect.

=== Scottish resurgence, 1338–1346 ===
Edward needed to guard the coast of England against the French and was attempting to form a field army to campaign on the continent again, but still found enough troops to send an expedition to Scotland in 1338. The French continued to supply the Scots, who had the better of the fighting. After several bitter campaigns, in which both sides freely destroyed crops and villages to limit their opponents' freedom of manoeuvre, the Scots wore down the English. French forces and ships assisted in the recapture of Perth in 1339. By 1340 the English influence in Scotland was limited to a handful of fortifications, Stirling being the most northerly, all of them either besieged or blockaded and supplied by sea from England. Hostilities were frequently interrupted by truces, which were not always well observed.

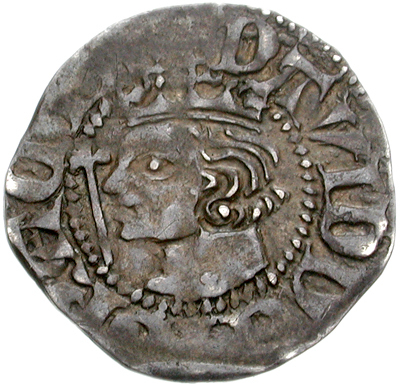
A coin depicting David

By 1341 fighting with the English had died down, but the Scottish nobility was riven with feuds. The teenage David II returned to Scotland on 2 June with his wife Joan, Edward's sister, and attempted to establish his own authority and surround himself with his own people; inflaming an already tense situation. Nevertheless, the English were steadily pushed back, with Stirling capitulating to the Scots in March 1342 after a lengthy siege, removing the last English stronghold in Scotland north of the immediate border area. Even there, the strong castle of Roxburgh fell to a dawn escalade in the same month. David's difficulties in imposing his authority were typified when he rewarded Alexander Ramsay of Dalhousie for retaking Roxburgh by appointing him constable of Roxburgh and sheriff of Teviotdale; this enraged Douglas, who had tried and failed to retake Roxburgh himself several times and who by some reports had already been given the positions. Douglas responded by imprisoning Ramsay and starving him to death. By 1345 David had established a degree of political control over the powerful Scottish nobility. The Scots continued to raid repeatedly into England.

=== Scottish invasion of England, 1346 ===
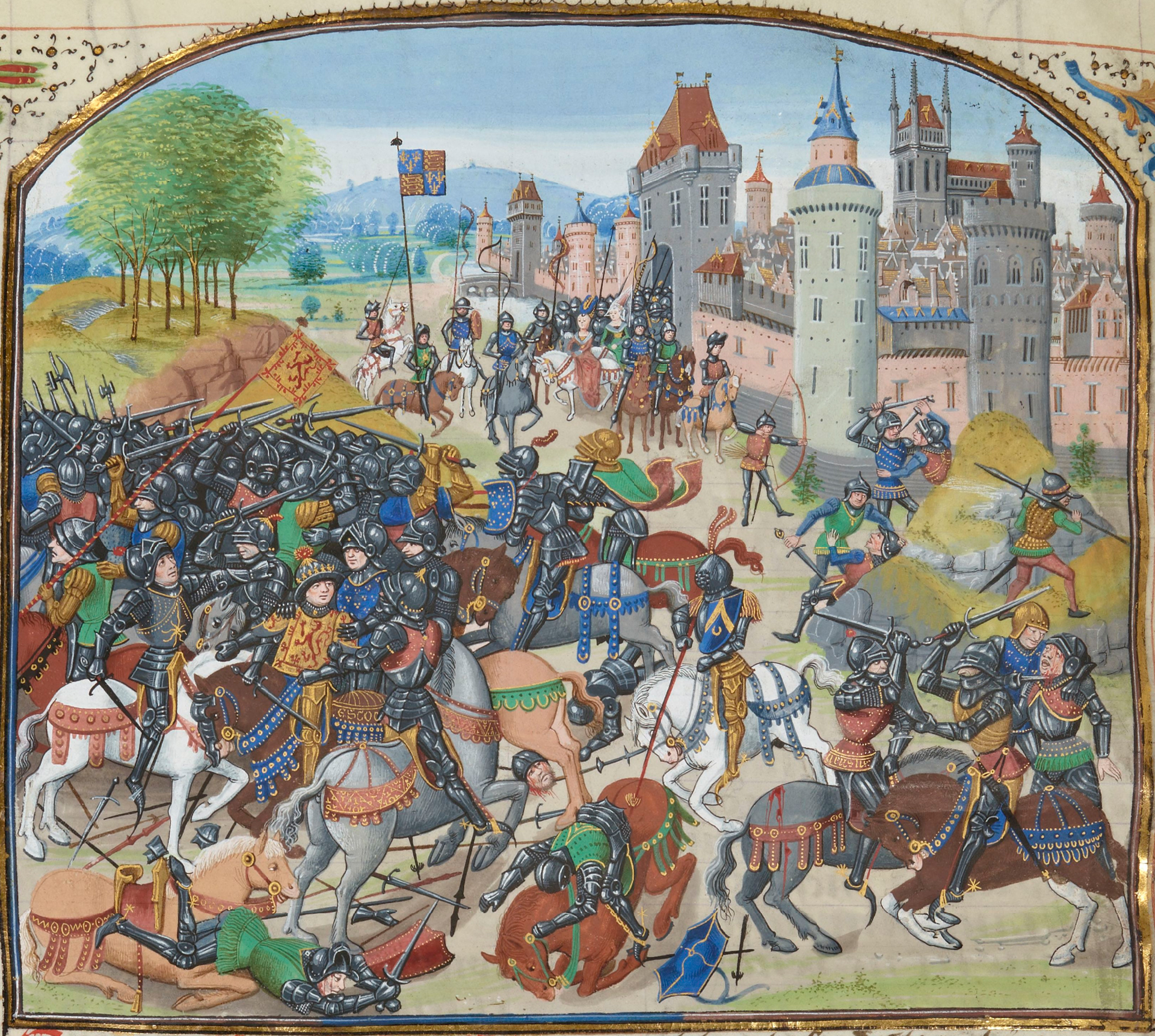
Battle of Neville's Cross from a 15th-century manuscript

In July 1346 Edward III landed in Normandy with an army of 15,000. Philip pleaded with David to fulfil Scottish obligations under the Auld Alliance and invade England: "I beg you, I implore you ... Do for me what I would willingly do for you in such a crisis and do it as quickly ... as you are able." As the English had also committed troops to Gascony, Brittany and Flanders, Philip described northern England as "a defenceless void". David felt certain few English troops would be left to defend the rich northern English cities, but when the Scots probed into northern England they were sharply rebuffed by the local defenders. David agreed a truce, to last until 29 September, to allow him to fully mobilise the Scottish army.

On 7 October the Scots invaded England with approximately 12,000 men. Many had modern weapons and armour supplied by France. A small number of French knights marched alongside the Scots. It was described by both Scottish and English chroniclers of the time, and by modern historians, as the strongest and best-equipped Scottish expedition for many years. The invasion had been expected by the English for some time and when raising his army to invade France Edward had exempted the counties north of the River Humber. Once the Scots invaded, an army was quickly mobilised, commanded by William de la Zouche, the Archbishop of York, who was Lord Warden of the Marches, and Lord Ralph Neville, numbering about 6,000–7,000 men. The Scots were surprised by the appearance of the English close to Durham.

On 17 October the two armies faced off. A stalemate lasted until the afternoon when the English sent longbowmen forward to harass the Scottish lines. The Earl of Menteith attempted to clear away the English archers with a cavalry charge, but this failed. The archers then succeeded in provoking the main Scottish force into attacking. By the time the first of the three Scottish divisions came to hand-to-hand combat it had been disorganised by the broken terrain and the fire of the English archers and was easily dealt with. Seeing their first attack repulsed, and also being harassed by the English archers, the third and largest Scottish division, on the Scottish left, under the Earl of March and Robert Stewart, broke and fled. The English stood off from the remaining Scots under David II and poured in arrows. The English men-at-arms then attacked and after fighting with what Jonathan Sumption describes as "ferocious courage", the remaining Scots attempted unsuccessfully to retreat and were routed. David, badly wounded, was captured after he fled the field, while the rest of the Scottish army was pursued by the English long into the night. More than 50 Scottish barons were killed or captured; Scotland lost almost all its military leadership.

== Captivity of David II ==
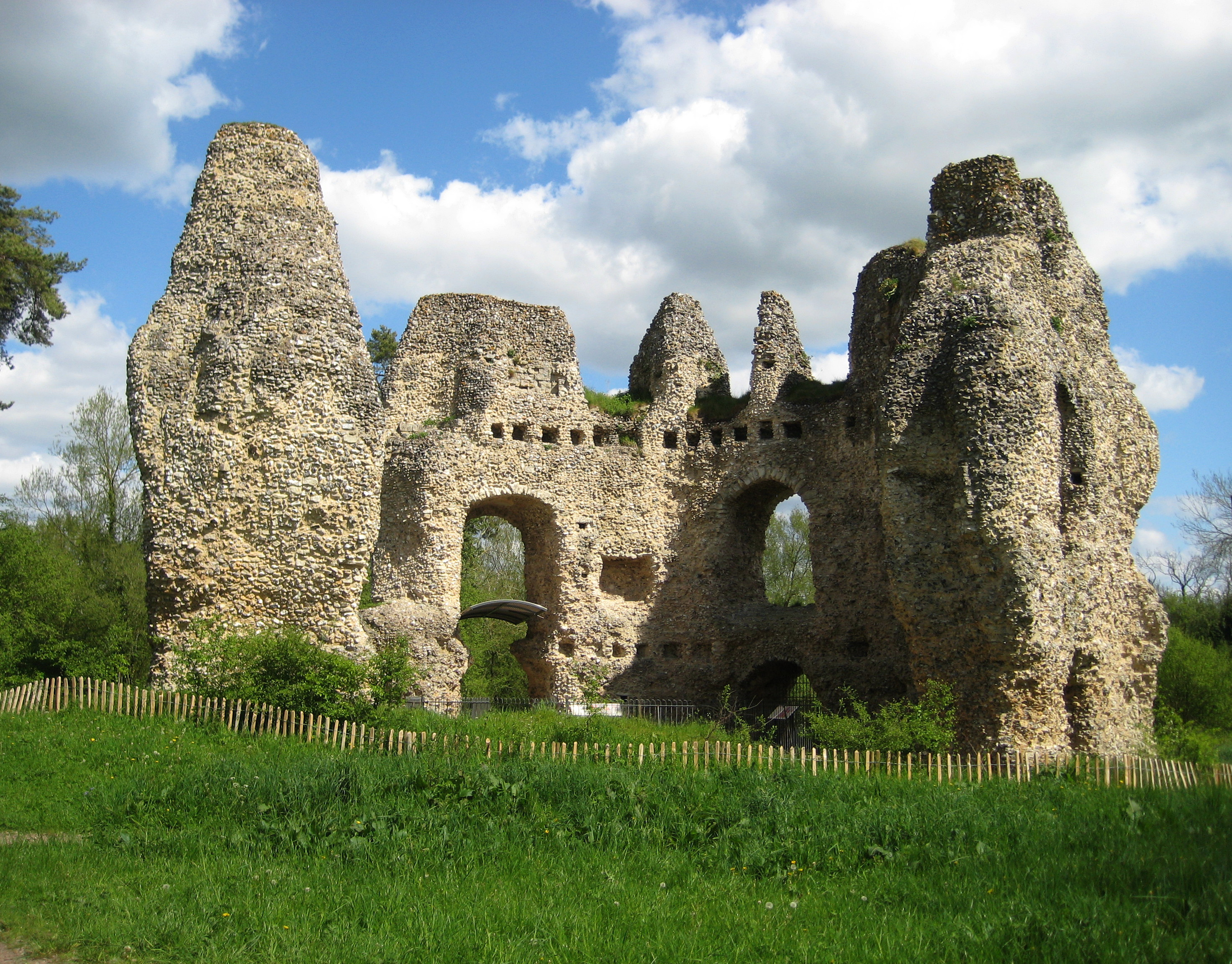
Odiham Castle in Hampshire where David II was imprisoned from 1346 to 1357

With David an English captive, Balliol, who had fought at Neville's Cross, set about recruiting forces for another excursion into Scotland. Neville and Henry, Baron Percy swiftly pressed the English advantage in the Anglo-Scottish border area. Balliol's subsequent campaign restored some of the southern communities to his allegiance, but on the whole, made little headway. With their king a captive, the Scots appointed Stewart lord guardian and regent for David; Stewart was David's nephew, the heir-apparent and a future king of Scotland (as Robert II). Stewart could be depended upon to defend Scotland from Balliol and the English, but otherwise was more interested in securing his own power than looking after that of his king. Stewart's authority was weak, as it largely depended on his acting on David's behalf and David was himself attempting to control affairs from England. Added to this, Stewart's having abandoned David at Neville's Cross gave David reason to mistrust him.

Edward attempted to come to terms with the Scots, using David as a bargaining counter. The details of the negotiations are unclear, but it seems that in 1348 Edward suggested David hold Scotland as a fief from England, naming Edward or one of his sons as his successor should he die without children. In 1350, Edward offered to ransom David for £40,000, the restoration of Balliol's Scottish supporters and the naming of Edward's young son John of Gaunt as David's successor, should the king die without children. Scotland as a fiefdom had been dropped from the negotiations. David was permitted to briefly return to Scotland in early 1352 to try to negotiate a settlement. Stewart was disinclined to support any terms which removed him from the succession, and the Parliament of Scotland rejected Edward's terms in March 1352. David returned to English imprisonment. Still preoccupied with the war in France, Edward tried again in 1354 with a simple demand of ransom, without settlement of the English claim to suzerainty over Scotland. The Scots also rejected this, partly because it would leave open the possibility of further English attempts to bring Scotland under their control.

=== English invasion of Scotland, 1356 ===
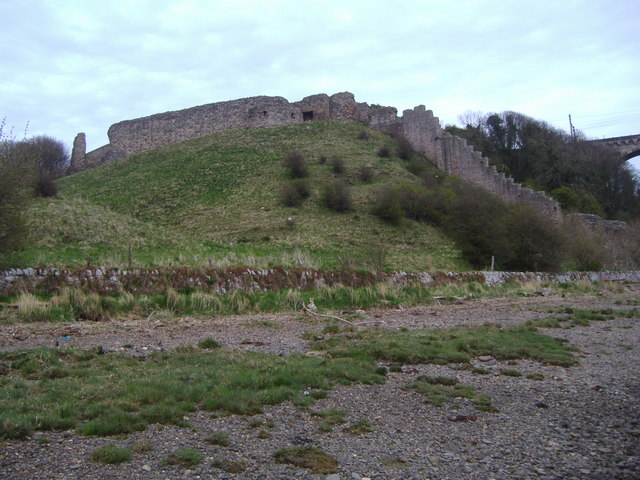
A section of the medieval town walls of Berwick

Tensions on the Anglo-Scottish border led to a military build-up by both sides in 1355. In September, a nine-month truce was arranged and most of the English forces left to take part in a campaign in northern France. A few days after agreeing the truce, the Scots, encouraged and subsidised by the French, broke it and invaded and devastated Northumberland. In late December, the Scots captured Berwick-on-Tweed and laid siege to its castle. The English army redeployed from France to Newcastle in northern England.

The English advanced to Berwick, retook the town and moved to Roxburgh in southern Scotland by mid-January 1356. There, on 20 January, Balliol surrendered his nominal position as king of Scotland in favour of Edward, his overlord, in exchange for a generous pension. From Roxburgh the English advanced on Edinburgh, leaving a trail of devastation 50–60 miles (80–100 km) wide behind them. The Scots practised their by-now traditional scorched earth policy, refusing battle and removing or destroying all food in their own territory. The English reached and burnt Edinburgh and were resupplied by sea at Haddington. Edward intended to march on Perth, perhaps to be crowned king of Scotland at nearby Scone. But contrary winds prevented the movement of the fleet he needed to supply his army. While waiting for a better wind, the English thoroughly despoiled Lothian. A winter storm drove the English fleet away and scattered it, and the English were forced to withdraw. They did so via Melrose, still widely devastating Scottish territory, but this time harassed by Scottish forces. The English army was disbanded in Carlisle in late February, and the Scots went on to take two English-held castles. A truce was re-established in April.

=== Treaty of Berwick, 1357 ===
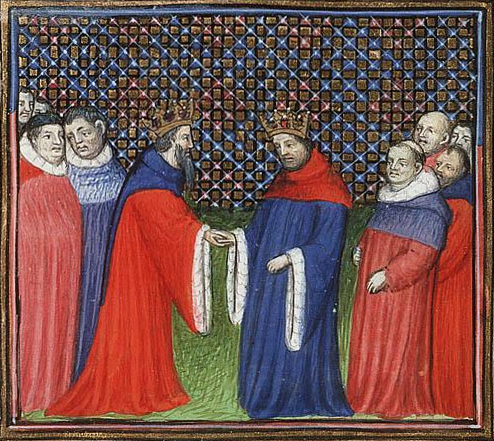
David II acknowledges Edward III as his feudal lord, as depicted in 1410

In September 1356 the French suffered a shattering defeat at the Battle of Poitiers. Approximately 6,000 from an army of 14,000–16,000 were killed or captured; the King of France was one of those taken prisoner. (Note: William, Earl of Douglas participated at the head of 200 picked Scottish men-at-arms; many were killed and Douglas was badly wounded but escaped.) This destroyed any Scottish hopes of satisfying their war aims as part of a French-imposed general treaty and raised the possibility that English troops would be freed up for further campaigning in Scotland. With no prospect of further military or financial assistance from the French the Scots negotiated a ransom of 100,000 marks (£67,000) for the return of David. According to the Treaty of Berwick the ransom was to be paid over ten years, on 24 June (St. John the Baptist's Day) each year. As a guarantee of payment, 23 Scottish nobles were held by the English. The treaty prohibited any Scottish citizen from bearing arms against Edward III or any of his men until the sum was paid in full and the English were supposed to stop attacking Scotland.

With the signing of the Treaty of Berwick, the Second War of Scottish Independence was effectively over. Edward had achieved little and the Scots had maintained their independence. However, the agreement was a truce, not a peace treaty, and while it lasted for four decades intermittent fighting continued. Large-scale hostilities resumed in 1400 when English king Henry IV (r. 1399–1413) led an army into Lothian.

David returned to Scotland to deal with the rivalries of his nobles. He was accused of having acquired a luxurious and expensive lifestyle and had to put down a rebellion in 1360. Thereafter, his throne was secure. His wife Joan did not return to Scotland with him, objecting to the English mistress he had taken during his eleven years in captivity. The treaty did impose a financial hardship on Scotland but less than the constant ravages by the English army. David stopped paying after only 20,000 marks of the debt had been met, following which renegotiation led ultimately to a reduction in the debt.

== Notes, citations and sources ==
=== Sources ===
- Barrow, Geoffrey Wallis Steuart (1965). Robert Bruce and the Community of the Realm of Scotland. London: Eyre and Spottiswoode. OCLC 655056131.
- Boardman, Stephen I. (May 2006). Robert II. Oxford Dictionary of National Biography (online ed.). Oxford University Press. doi:10.1093/ref:odnb/23713.
- Brie, Friedrich (1960). The Brut; or, The Chronicles of England. Early English Text Society (repr. ed.). Oxford: Oxford University Press. OCLC 15591643.
- Brown, Chris (2002). The Second Scottish Wars of Independence, 1332–1363. Stroud, Gloucestershire: Tempus. ISBN 978-0-7524-2312-8.
- Brown, Michael (2004). The Wars of Scotland, 1214–1371. Edinburgh: Edinburgh University Press. ISBN 978-0-7486-1238-3.
- Burne, Alfred (1999). The Crecy War. Ware, Hertfordshire: Wordsworth Editions. ISBN 978-1-8402-2210-4.
- Crowcroft, Robert & Cannon, John (2015). "Franco-Scottish Alliance". The Oxford Companion to British History. Oxford: Oxford University Press. pp. 379–380. ISBN 978-0-1996-7783-2.
- DeVries, Kelly (1998). Infantry Warfare in the Early Fourteenth Century : Discipline, Tactics, and Technology. Woodbridge, Suffolk; Rochester, New York: Boydell & Brewer. ISBN 978-0-85115-571-5.
- Duncan, A. A. M. (2004). "Douglas, Sir William, lord of Liddesdale (c. 1310–1353)". Oxford Dictionary of National Biography. Oxford University Press. doi:10.1093/ref:odnb/7923.
- Given-Wilson, Chris (2016). Henry IV. Padstow: Yale University Press. ISBN 978-0-3001-5419-1.
- Given-Wilson, Chris & Bériac, Françoise (September 2001). "Edward III's Prisoners of War: The Battle of Poitiers and its Context". The English Historical Review. 116 (468): 802–833. doi:10.1093/ehr/CXVI.468.802. ISSN 0013-8266.
- Hall, Bert (1999). "Technology and Tactics". In Corfis, Ivy; Wolfe, Michael (eds.). The Medieval City Under Siege. Medieval Archaeology Series. Woodbridge, Suffolk: Boydell and Brewer. pp. 257–276. ISBN 978-0-8511-5756-6.
- Harris, Robin (1994). Valois Guyenne. Royal Historical Society Studies in History. Vol. 71. London: Boydell Press. ISBN 978-0-8619-3226-9.
- Hoskins, Peter (2011). In the Steps of the Black Prince: The Road to Poitiers, 1355–1356. Woodbridge, Suffolk: Boydell. ISBN 978-1-8438-3611-7.
- King, Andy (2002). "According to the Custom Used in French and Scottish Wars: Prisoners and Casualties on the Scottish Marches in the Fourteenth Century". Journal of Medieval History. XXVIII (3): 263–290. doi:10.1016/S0048-721X(02)00057-X. ISSN 0304-4181. S2CID 159873083.
- Mackay, James (2009). William Wallace: Brave Heart. Edinburgh; London: Mainstream Publishing. ISBN 978-1-8515-8823-7.
- The Chronicle of Lanercost, 1272–1346. Translated by Maxwell, Herbert. Glasgow: J. Maclehose. 1913. OCLC 27639133.
- Nicholson, Ranald (1961). "The Siege of Berwick, 1333". The Scottish Historical Review. XXXX (129): 19–42. JSTOR 25526630. OCLC 664601468.
- Nicholson, Ranald (1974). Scotland: The Later Middle Ages. University of Edinburgh History of Scotland. Edinburgh: Oliver and Boyd. ISBN 978-0-0500-2038-8.
- Ormrod, Mark (2008). "War in Scotland, 1332–1336". Oxford Dictionary of National Biography. doi:10.1093/ref:odnb/8519. ISBN 978-0-19-861412-8.
- Ormrod, Mark (1990). The Reign of Edward III. Yale Medieval Monarchs series. New Haven, Connecticut: Yale University Press. ISBN 978-0-3001-1910-7.
- Ormrod, Mark (2012). Edward III. Yale Medieval Monarchs series. New Haven, Connecticut: Yale University Press. ISBN 978-0-3001-1910-7.
- Penman, Michael (2004). David II. East Linton, East Lothian: Tuckwell Press. ISBN 978-1-8623-2202-8.
- Prestwich, Michael (1988). Edward I. Yale Medieval Monarchs series. Berkeley: University of California Press. ISBN 978-0-5200-6266-5.
- Prestwich, Michael & Rollason, David (1998). The Battle of Neville's Cross, 1346. Stamford, Lincolnshire: Shaun Tyas for the North-East England History Institute. ISBN 978-1-9002-8919-1.
- Prestwich, Michael (2005). Roberts, J. M. (ed.). Plantagenet England. Oxford: Oxford University Press. ISBN 978-0-1992-2687-0.
- Rodwell, Warwick (2013). The Coronation Chair and Stone of Scone: History, Archaeology and Conservation. Oxford: Oxbow Books. ISBN 978-1-7829-7153-5.
- Rogers, Clifford (2014) [2000]. War Cruel and Sharp: English Strategy under Edward III, 1327–1360. Woodbridge, Suffolk: Boydell Press. ISBN 978-0-8511-5804-4.
- Rogers, Clifford (2010). The Oxford Encyclopedia of Medieval Warfare and Military Technology. Vol. I. Oxford: Oxford University Press. ISBN 978-0-1953-3403-6.
- Sadler, John (2013) [2005], Border Fury: England and Scotland at War 1296–1568, London; New York: Routledge, ISBN 978-1-4058-4022-4
- Strickland, Matthew & Hardy, Robert (2011). The Great Warbow: From Hastings to the Mary Rose. Somerset: J. H. Haynes & Co. ISBN 978-0-8573-3090-1.
- Sumption, Jonathan (1990). Trial by Battle. The Hundred Years' War. Vol. I. London: Faber and Faber. ISBN 978-0-5712-0095-5.
- Sumption, Jonathan (1999). Trial by Fire. The Hundred Years War. Vol. II. London: Faber and Faber. ISBN 978-0-5711-3896-8.
- Tuck, Anthony (2002). "A Medieval Tax Haven: Berwick upon Tweed and the English Crown, 1333–1461". In Britnel, Richard & Hatcher, John (eds.). Progress and Problems in Medieval England: Essays in Honour of Edward Miller. Cambridge: Cambridge University Press. pp. 148–167. ISBN 978-0-5215-2273-1.
- Wagner, John A. (2006). "Neville's Cross, Battle of (1346)". Encyclopedia of the Hundred Years War. Woodbridge, Suffolk: Greenwood. pp. 228–229. ISBN 978-0-3133-2736-0.
- Wagner, John A. (2006b). "David II, King of Scotland (1324–1371)". Encyclopedia of the Hundred Years War. Woodbridge, Suffolk: Greenwood. pp. 109–110. ISBN 978-0-3133-2736-0.
- Webster, Bruce (2004). "The Oxford Dictionary of National Biography". David II (1324–1371). Oxford Dictionary of National Biography. Oxford University Press. doi:10.1093/ref:odnb/3726.
- Webster, Bruce (2004b). "Balliol, Edward (b. in or after 1281, d. 1364)". Oxford Dictionary of National Biography. Oxford University Press. doi:10.1093/ref:odnb/1206.
- Weir, Alison (2006). Queen Isabella: Treachery, Adultery, and Murder in Medieval England. New York: Random House. ISBN 978-0-3454-5320-4.
- Wyntoun, Andrew (1907). Amours, François Joseph (ed.). The Original Chronicle of Scotland. Vol. II. Edinburgh: Blackwood. OCLC 61938371.
