= Sieges of Berwick (1355 and 1356) =

14th-century Scottish military campaign

- Part of the Second War of Scottish Independence
Date	6 November 1355 – 13 January 1356
Location	Berwick-upon-Tweed
Result	Status quo ante

Belligerents
Scotland	England

Commanders and leaders
Thomas, Earl of Angus; Patrick, Earl of March	King Edward III; Walter Mauny

Strength
Unknown	Unknown

Casualties and losses
Unknown	Unknown

The sieges of Berwick were the Scottish capture of the English town of Berwick-upon-Tweed on 6 November 1355, the subsequent unsuccessful siege of Berwick Castle, and the English siege and recapture of the town in January 1356. The Scots had been fighting the English in the Second War of Scottish Independence since 1332. After a period of military inactivity, the Scots assembled an army on the border in 1355. They were encouraged in this by the French, who had been fighting the English in the Hundred Years' War since 1337. In September the Scots and the English agreed a truce, and much of the English army left the border area to join King Edward III's campaign in France.

In October the Scots broke the truce, invading Northumbria and devastating much of it. On 6 November a Scottish force led by Thomas, Earl of Angus, and Patrick, Earl of March, captured the town of Berwick in a pre-dawn escalade. They failed to capture the castle, which they besieged. Edward returned from France and gathered a large army at Newcastle. Most of the Scots withdrew, leaving a 130-man garrison in Berwick town. When the English army arrived, the Scots negotiated a safe passage and withdrew. Edward went on to devastate a large part of southern and central Scotland. He was only prevented from worse depredations because bad weather prevented his seaborne supplies from arriving.

== Background ==
The First War of Scottish Independence between England and Scotland began in 1296, when Edward I of England (r. 1272–1307) stormed and sacked the Scottish border town of Berwick-upon-Tweed as a prelude to his invasion of Scotland. More than 32 years of warfare followed, with Berwick being recaptured by the Scots in 1318. The disastrous English Weardale campaign brought Isabella of France and Roger Mortimer, regents of the newly-crowned 14-year-old King Edward III (r. 1327–1377), to the negotiating table. They agreed to the Treaty of Northampton with Robert Bruce (r. 1306–1329) in 1328, recognising Scotland as an independent nation.

Edward never accepted the validity of the treaty and in 1333 he besieged Berwick again, starting the Second War of Scottish Independence. The Scots felt compelled to attempt to relieve the town. A Scottish army 20,000 strong attacked the 10,000 English and suffered a devastating defeat at the Battle of Halidon Hill. Berwick surrendered the next day. The Hundred Years' War between England and France commenced in 1337, and in 1346 Edward led an English army across northern France, winning the Battle of Crécy and besieging Calais. Encouraged by the French king, John II (r. 1350–1364), the Scots invaded England with a large army, certain that few English troops would be left to defend the rich northern English cities. The Scots were decisively beaten at the Battle of Neville's Cross and their king, David II (r. 1329–1371), was captured. The Scottish threat receded and the English were able to commit fully to the war with France.

=== Berwick ===
The location of Berwick and some other places named in the text on a map of north-east England with modern boundaries

Berwick, on the North Sea coast of Britain, is on the Anglo-Scottish border, astride the main invasion and trade route in either direction. In the Middle Ages it was the gateway from Scotland to the English eastern march. According to William Edington, a bishop and chancellor of England, Berwick was "so populous and of such commercial importance that it might rightly be called another Alexandria, whose riches were the sea and the water its walls". Prior to its capture in 1333 it was the most successful trading town in Scotland, and the duty on wool which passed through it for export was the Scottish Crown's largest single source of income.

After it was sacked in 1296, Edward I replaced Berwick's old wooden palisade with stone walls. These were considerably improved by the Scots in 1318. The walls stretched for 2 miles (3.2 kilometres) and were up to 40 inches (3 feet; 1 metre) thick and 22 feet (6.7 metres) high. They were protected by 19 towers, each up to 60 feet (20 metres) tall. The wall to the south-west was further protected by the River Tweed, which was crossed by a stone bridge and entered the town at a stone gatehouse. There were three further gates. (Note: The surviving town walls are mostly of a later date and are considerably smaller than those of 1318.) The circumference and complexity of the defences necessitated a large garrison. Berwick Castle was to the west of the town, separated by a broad moat; this made the town and castle independent strongholds. Some sources state that in 1355 the town's and castle's defences were in good repair, while others hold that they had been ill maintained. The castle was overtopped in places by the town walls, and difficult to defend if the town was not also held; because of this, when the town of Berwick fell to the Scots in 1318 the castle was subsequently captured within a few days.

=== Prelude ===
By 1355 David II was still a prisoner, but the French were pressing the Scottish nobles to take military action under the Auld Alliance, which stipulated that if either country were attacked by England, the other country would invade English territory. The Scots gathered an army on the border and the English mobilised in response. The French sent 50 or 60 men-at-arms under Yon de Garencières to Scotland. They also promised the Scots a large cash payment to be distributed among their elite if they would invade England. When this payment failed to arrive by late September the Scots agreed a nine-month truce with the English. A large part of the English force subsequently moved south to join Edward's planned campaign in northern France. The English military focus was very much on France, with Edward's son the Black Prince about to lead an attack in south-west France. Many members of the garrisons of the English border fortresses left their posts without permission to join Edward's expedition to France. These included the commander of the Berwick town garrison, William, Lord Greystoke.

A few days after the truce was signed, the French cash, 40,000 gold écus, arrived. Waiting only until the departing English were well on their way, the Scottish reneged on the treaty and invaded Northumberland in northern England. They were probably fewer than 2,000 strong, but there was no English field force to oppose them. The Constable of Norham Castle, an important English border fortification, attempted to counterattack with part of his garrison and some locals, but this scratch force was routed. The Scots pillaged and burned villages across Northumbria. Edward received the news on 20 October, by which time much of his army was already in France and the balance was embarking. He continued with his campaign in France, where he led a chevauchée – a large-scale mounted raid – across Picardy, attempting to draw the French army into battle. The French evaded, prevaricated and avoided battle.

== Fall and recapture of Berwick town ==
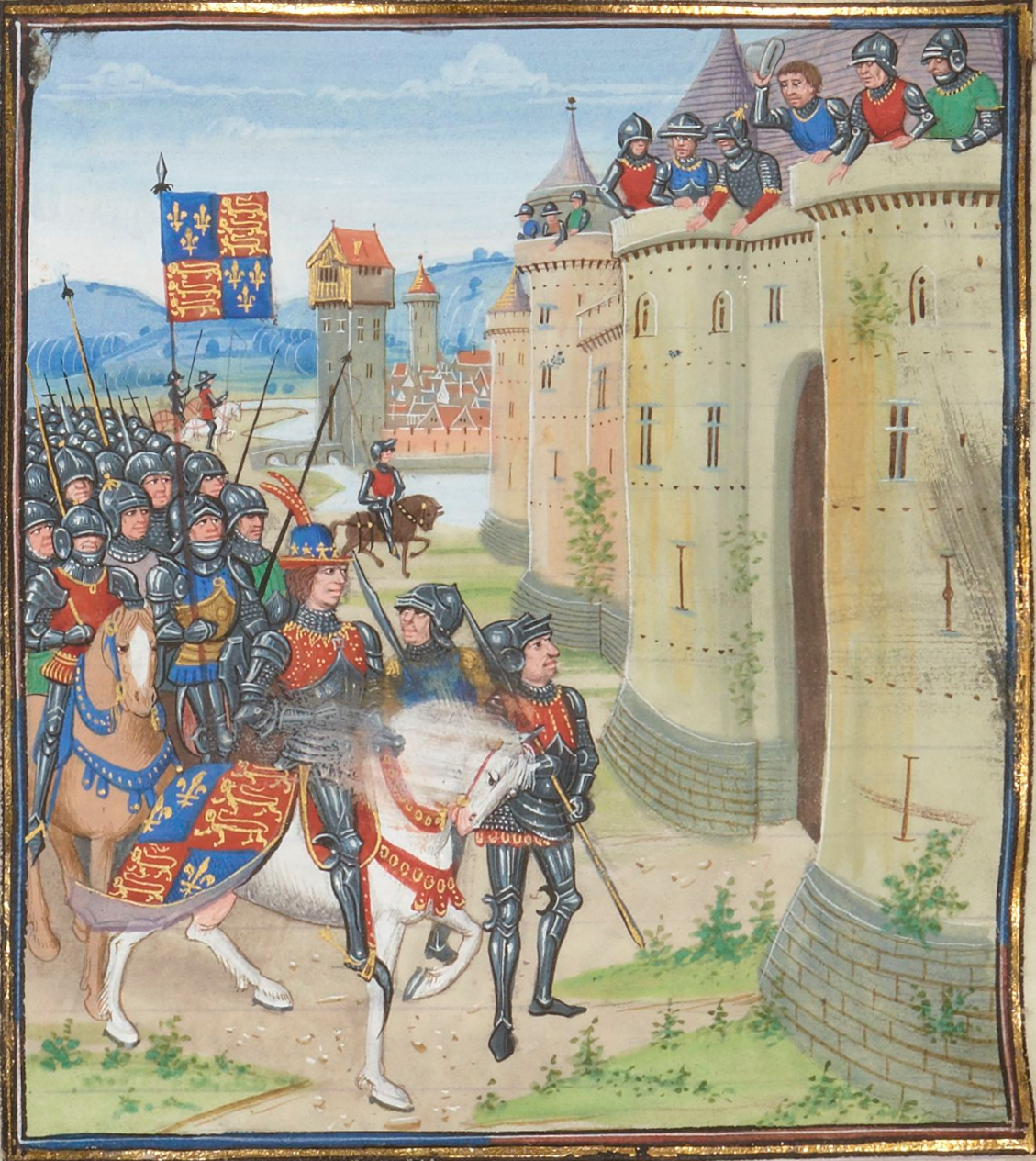
The 1333 siege of Berwick

The Scottish nobles Thomas, Earl of Angus, and Patrick, Earl of March gathered a small force of Scots to supplement the French, and boats to transport them in. After training for six days they attacked Berwick town on 6 November, landing under the cover of night and escalading the walls shortly before dawn. Overrunning the walls the Scots then pressed the short-handed garrison back through the town towards the castle. The English town garrison and the town's inhabitants took refuge in the castle, while the Scots looted the town. The castle was already strongly garrisoned and was promptly reinforced by John Coupland, who arrived with part of the English garrison of Roxburgh. The Guardian of Scotland, Robert Stewart, who was acting as regent for the imprisoned David II, took personal control of the siege of the castle. There was a fortified bridge from the town to the castle which was defended on the side closest the town (the east side) by a tower known as the Douglas tower. The English garrisons had held this against the initial Scottish attack, but it fell to a subsequent assault. The Scots then attempted to mine the castle's walls and launched further assaults against it.

Meanwhile the expedition in Picardy was proving inconclusive. Edward attempted to set up an arranged battle, but no agreement could be reached. According to some sources, during these discussions Edward received word of the fall of Berwick town and the siege of the castle; he cut short the negotiations and returned his army to England after receiving the news. According to other accounts it was not until he disembarked in England with the army on 12 November, after the negotiations with the French had failed, that he learnt of the fall of Berwick. In any event, Edward was in Newcastle by Christmas Eve (24 December), where a large army was assembling, and a small fleet was being prepared to supply it. The army left Newcastle on 6 January 1356.

A force under Walter Mauny went ahead, escorting 120 miners. When they reached Berwick they found the castle was still holding out. Most of the original Scottish assault force had left, leaving a garrison in the town of 130 men, too few to adequately garrison the walls. The English laid siege to the town and the Scots could expect no relief force, according to a contemporary "by reason of the discord of the magnates". At some stage the French men-at-arms under Garencières had withdrawn to France; they had collectively brought Scotland back into the war and individually enriched themselves with loot from Berwick. The miners tunnelled towards the town walls while Mauny prepared simultaneous land and sea assaults. On 13 January Edward arrived with the main English army. The Scots offered to parley and not wishing to be delayed Edward agreed to let them leave, even allowing them to take what plunder they could carry.

== Aftermath ==
Edward moved his army up the River Tweed to Roxburgh and on 26 January the English army set off towards Edinburgh, leaving a 20-mile-wide (32 km) trail of devastation behind them. According to the contemporary chronicler John of Fordun, Edward intended "to destroy and ruin Scotland both near and far, and indeed to devastate it utterly." Modern historians differ as to how they assess Edward's intentions: Chris Brown considers that the invasion of Scotland and associated devastation was an improvised campaign by Edward, intended to deter future Scottish aggression. Jonathan Sumption broadly agrees with this. Ranald Nicholson states that Edward's plan was to march on the Scottish capital at Perth via Stirling, perhaps to be crowned King of Scotland at nearby Scone – the traditional place of coronation for Scottish monarchs. Clifford Rogers also believes that Edward intended to march on Perth, supplied from the sea by the large fleet he had assembled.

The Scots practised a scorched earth policy, refusing battle and devastating their own territory. This made the English almost entirely dependent on sea-borne supply for food. But poor weather prevented the English supply ships from linking up with the army. While the English waited for the wind to change they devastated Lothian so thoroughly that the Scots called the English incursion "Burnt Candlemas". (Note: This was a reference to the custom of the time of taking one's annual stock of candles to the local church on 2 February to be blessed in a ceremony known as Candlemas; they were then used over the rest of the year.) A winter storm then scattered the fleet, causing Edward to cut short the campaign and withdraw. Knowing that the route back to Berwick was too devastated to feed the army, he retreated via Moffat to Carlisle. The English were severely harassed en route and arrived in England at the end of February with the army in poor condition.

An English army did not enter Scotland again for another 50 years. In September 1356 the French suffered a shattering defeat at the Battle of Poitiers. With no prospect of further military or financial assistance from the French the Scots negotiated a ransom for the return of David and an associated truce at the Treaty of Berwick The signing of the treaty meant that the Second War of Scottish Independence was effectively over, with the Scots establishing their independence from English sovereignty.

== Notes, citations and sources ==
=== Sources ===
- Barrow, Geoffrey Wallis Steuart (1965). Robert Bruce and the Community of the Realm of Scotland. London: Eyre and Spottiswoode. OCLC 655056131.
- Blackenstall, Stan (2010). Coastal Castles of Northumberland. Stroud: Amberley. ISBN 978-1-44560-196-0.
- Brown, Chris (2002). The Second Scottish Wars of Independence, 1332–1363. Stroud, Gloucestershire: Tempus. ISBN 978-0-7524-2312-8.
- Brown, Michael (2004). The Wars of Scotland 1214–1371. Edinburgh: Edinburgh University Press. ISBN 0-7486-1238-6.
- Brown, Michael (2008). Bannockburn. Edinburgh: Edinburgh University Press. ISBN 978-0-7486-3333-3.
- Burne, Alfred (1999) [1955]. The Crecy War. Ware, Hertfordshire: Wordsworth Editions. ISBN 978-1-84022-210-4.
- Chisholm, Hugh, ed. (1911). "Candlemas" . Encyclopædia Britannica. Vol. 5 (11th ed.). Cambridge University Press. p. 179. OCLC 14004298
- Forster, Robert Henry (1907). "The Walls of Berwick-upon-Tweed". Journal of the British Archaeological Association. XIII (2): 89–104. doi:10.1080/00681288.1907.11894053. ISSN 0068-1288.
- Given-Wilson, Chris & Bériac, Françoise (September 2001). "Edward III's Prisoners of War: The Battle of Poitiers and its Context". The English Historical Review. 116 (468): 802–833. doi:10.1093/ehr/CXVI.468.802. ISSN 0013-8266.
- MacDougall, Norman (2001). An Antidote to the English: The Auld Alliance, 1295–1560. East Linton, Scotland: Tuckwell Press. ISBN 1-86232-145-0.
- Maxwell, Herbert, ed. (1913). The Chronicle of Lanercost, 1272–1346: Translated, with notes. Glasgow: J. Maclehose and Sons. OCLC 457526322.
- Nicholson, Ranald (1974). Scotland: The Later Middle Ages. University of Edinburgh History of Scotland. Edinburgh: Oliver and Boyd. ISBN 978-0-05002-038-8.
- Ormrod, Mark (1990). The Reign of Edward III. Yale Medieval Monarchs series. New Haven: Yale University Press. ISBN 978-0-300-11910-7.
- Penman, Michael (2004). David II. East Linton, East Lothian: Tuckwell Press. ISBN 978-1-86232-202-8.
- Pettifer, Adrian (2002). English Castles: A Guide by Counties. Woodbridge, Suffolk: Boydell and Brewer. ISBN 978-0-85115-782-5.
- Prestwich, Michael (1988). Edward I. Yale Medieval Monarchs series. Berkeley: University of California Press. ISBN 978-0-52006-266-5.
- Robson, Eric (2007). The Border Line. London: Frances Lincoln Publishers. ISBN 978-0-71122-716-3.
- Rodwell, Warwick (2013). The Coronation Chair and Stone of Scone: History, Archaeology and Conservation. Oxford: Oxbow Books. ISBN 978-1-7829-7153-5.
- Rogers, Clifford (2010). The Oxford Encyclopedia of Medieval Warfare and Military Technology. Vol. I. Oxford: Oxford University Press. ISBN 978-0-19533-403-6.
- Rogers, Clifford (2014) [2000]. War Cruel and Sharp: English Strategy under Edward III, 1327–1360. Woodbridge, Suffolk: Boydell Press. ISBN 978-0-85115-804-4.
- Sumption, Jonathan (1990). Trial by Battle. The Hundred Years' War. Vol. I. London: Faber and Faber. ISBN 978-0-57120-095-5.
- Sumption, Jonathan (1999). Trial by Fire. The Hundred Years War. Vol. II. London: Faber and Faber. ISBN 978-0-571-13896-8.
- Tuck, Anthony (2002). "A Medieval Tax Haven: Berwick upon Tweed and the English Crown, 1333–1461". In Britnel, Richard; Hatcher, John (eds.). Progress and Problems in Medieval England: Essays in Honour of Edward Miller. Cambridge: Cambridge University Press. pp. 148–167. ISBN 978-0-52152-273-1.
- Wagner, John A. (2006a). "Chevauchée of 1355". Encyclopedia of the Hundred Years War. Woodbridge, Suffolk: Greenwood. pp. 95–96. ISBN 978-0-313-32736-0.
- Wagner, John A. (2006b). "Chronology: The Hundred Years War". Encyclopedia of the Hundred Years War. Woodbridge, Suffolk: Greenwood. pp. xxxix–l. ISBN 978-0-313-32736-0.
