= Capture of Berwick =

Capture of Berwick or Siege of Berwick may refer to:

- Capture of Berwick (1296) (Sack of Berwick)
- Siege of Berwick (1318)
- Siege of Berwick (1333)
- Sieges of Berwick (1355 and 1356)
- Capture of Berwick (1482)
