= Treaty of Berwick (1357) =

1357 treaty ending the Second War of Scottish Independence

The Treaty of Berwick, signed at Berwick-upon-Tweed, England, on 3 October 1357, officially ended the Second War of Scottish Independence. In this second phase of the Wars of Scottish Independence, which began in 1333, King Edward III of England attempted to install Edward Balliol on the Scottish throne, in place of King David II, son of Robert the Bruce.

Under the terms of the treaty, David II was released by the English, who had captured him at the Battle of Neville's Cross in 1346. The English demanded a ransom of 100,000 merks, or £67,000 sterling for his release, payable in annual instalments over a period of ten years, but only the first two payments were made. The first instalment of the ransom was paid punctually, the second was late, and after that no more could be paid. Taxation was increased in order to pay the ransom, and David began to embezzle from his own ransom fund, causing widespread resentment, and culminating in the ransom protest of 1363. During the protest, Robert Stewart joined by Patrick V, Earl of March and William Douglas, 1st Earl of Douglas, rose in revolt against the embezzlement. David II responded quickly to the uprising and it collapsed. The rebels were forced to give oaths of fealty.

When the ransom could not be paid David II also offered to name Edward III of England or one of his sons as his successor, which was rejected by the Scottish Parliament. The issue of succession was settled when Robert Stewart assumed the throne on David's death in 1371.

== Sources ==
- Mitchison, Rosalind. A History of Scotland
