= Escalade =

Using ladders to scale defensive walls

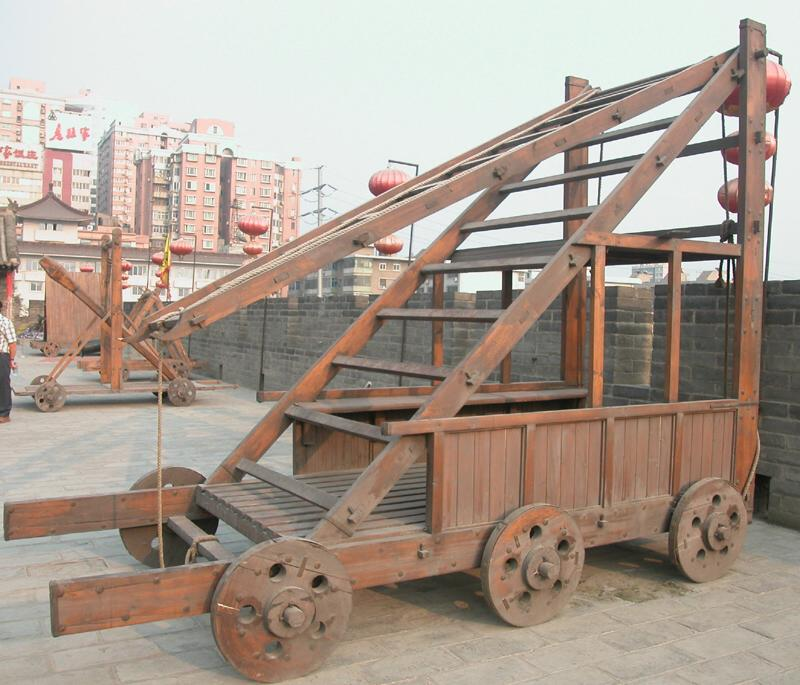
A replica of an ancient scaling ladder used for escalade, in Xi'an, China

Escalade is the act of scaling defensive walls or ramparts with the aid of ladders. Escalade was a prominent feature of sieges in ancient and medieval warfare. Although no longer common in modern warfare, escalade technologies are still developed and used in certain tactical applications.

== Etymology ==
It is a borrowed French word, the noun-equivalent form of the verb escalader, meaning "to climb" or "to scale".

== Overview ==
Escalade consists of attacking soldiers advancing to the base of a wall, setting ladders, and climbing to engage the defending forces. Though very simple and direct, it was also one of the most dangerous options available; escalade would generally be conducted in the face of arrow fire from the battlements, and the defenders would naturally attempt to push ladders away from the wall. Heated or incendiary substances such as boiling water, heated sand, and pitch-coated missiles were sometimes poured on attacking soldiers. This made it difficult for attackers to reach the top of the wall, and those that did would often quickly be overwhelmed by the defenders on the walls, only being able to push into the defenses after suffering heavy attrition.

Fortifications were often constructed in such a way as to impede escalade, or at least to make it a less attractive option. Countermeasures to escalade included moats (which prevented ladder-bearing soldiers from reaching the base of a wall), machicolations (which facilitated attacks on enemy soldiers while they climbed), and talus walls (which could weaken ladders or were too tall for ladders to reach the top of).

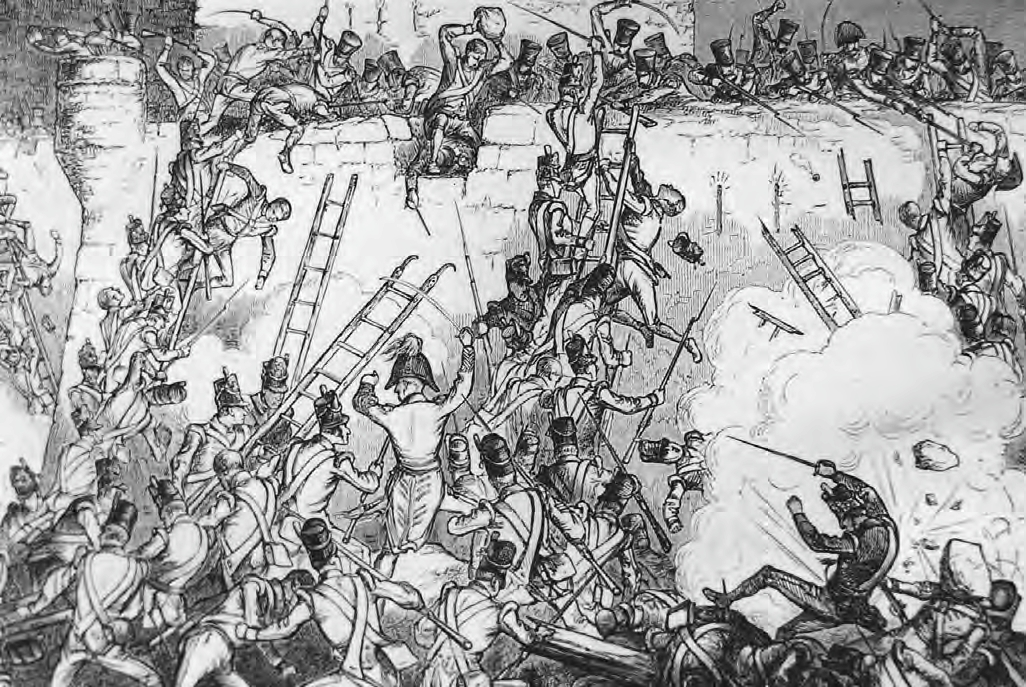
The escalade during the Siege of Badajoz in 1812, part of the Peninsular War

Because of the difficulties involved, escalade was typically very costly for the attackers. Two critical factors in determining the success or failure of escalade were the number of ladders and the speed with which they could be arranged. A slow attack gave the defenders too much time to pick off the attackers with arrows, while having too few ladders meant that the number of troops would be insufficient to capture the battlements. A third important factor was the estimation of the height of the wall. If the ladders were made too long, they could be pushed over by the defenders, and if they were too short, the attackers would not be able to reach the top of the wall. Tactics employed included getting as many men as possible on the ladder at the same time (the more men that were on the ladder at the same time, the heavier it became, making pushing it over difficult), attacking by night, or scaling a remote section of the wall.

Escalade was, in essence, an attempt to overwhelm defenders in a direct assault rather than sit through a protracted siege. Attackers would generally attempt escalade if they had reasons for wanting a swift conclusion, or if they had an overwhelming superiority in numbers. Otherwise, less costly siege tactics were often preferred.

== Modern warfare ==
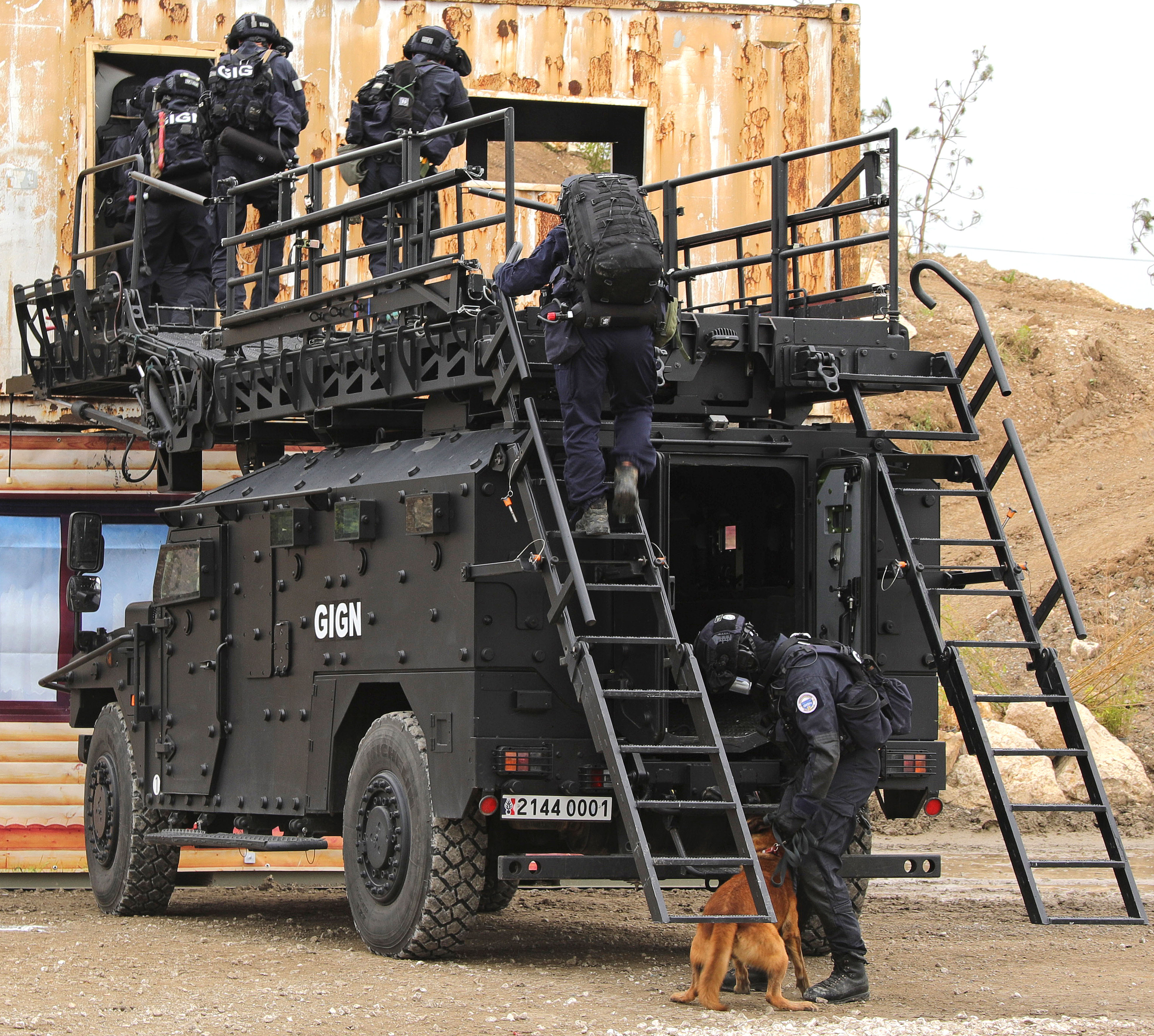
GIGN operators using a modern assault ladder installed on the roof of a Sherpa Light armored vehicle

Escalade is no longer common in modern warfare, as new technologies and tactics have essentially made escalade obsolete; for example, most fortified walls that would have required attackers to use escalade may now simply be destroyed by explosives or nullified by military aircraft.

However, escalade still exists as a viable (albeit niche) combat tactic, and is occasionally used by police tactical, counterterrorist, and special forces units to raid a structure through its upper levels, either to avoid a barricaded entrance or line of sight, or to breach the structure from multiple points. Mechanical assault ladders, typically installed on the roof of vehicles and featuring ramps that can extend or angle themselves to reach an entry point such as a window sill or balcony, are often used in this capacity.

== See also ==
- Siege tower
- L'Escalade, the commemoration of the failed attack on Geneva by Savoy in 1602, conducted by escalade
