= Warwick Rodwell =

British archaeologist (born 1946)

Warwick James Rodwell OBE (born 24 October 1946) is an archaeologist, architectural historian and academic. He was lately visiting professor in the Department of Archaeology, University of Reading, and is Consultant Archaeologist to Westminster Abbey, where he is also a member of the College of St Peter in Westminster. He is the author of many books and articles, including the standard textbook on church archaeology (first published in 1981). He is a Fellow of the Society of Antiquaries of London, the Society of Antiquaries of Scotland and the Royal Historical Society.

== Early life and education ==
Warwick Rodwell was born at Rochford in Essex on 24 October 1946, the only child of Thomas George Rodwell and his wife Olive Ellen (née Nottage). He attended the local grammar school, Southend High School for Boys, and afterwards went to Loughborough College of Education (then part of the University of Nottingham), now Loughborough University, where he studied creative design and history, and trained as a technology teacher (1965–68) and was awarded a Diploma of Loughborough College (DLC); the university subsequently awarded him the degree of BSc. After Loughborough he studied archaeology at the Institute of Archaeology (now part of University College London), graduating with a BA Honours in the archaeology of the Roman Provinces (1972). He then went to Worcester College, Oxford, and carried out research for a thesis, based at the Institute of Archaeology (part of the School of Archaeology, University of Oxford), on "Settlement and Economy in the Territory of the Trinovantes, c 500 BC to AD 50", for which he received a DPhil (1976). He also has an MA degree awarded for a thesis at the School of History, University of Birmingham (1979). In recognition of his publications, he was awarded the degrees of DLitt (University of Oxford, 1992) and DLit (University of London, 1998).

Listed degrees and qualifications: OBE, DLC, BSc, BA, MA, DPhil, DLitt, DLit, FSA, FSAScot, FRHistS.

== Career ==
Rodwell excavated a number of prehistoric, Roman, Anglo-Saxon and medieval sites in Essex and Eastern England during the 1960s and 1970s, including Asheldham, Hadstock, Kelvedon, Rivenhall and Wickford. While excavating part of the Roman villa underlying Rivenhall churchyard, 1971–73, he recognized the need for a holistic archaeological study of the site, embracing both the buried remains of the villa and the fabric of the Anglo-Saxon and medieval church that stands today. In 1971 there was still a rigid division between the disciplines of archaeology and architectural history: professional archaeologists excavated buried evidence, and architectural historians studied standing buildings. Collaboration between the two disciplines was non-existent. Rodwell was instrumental in bringing about change and applying the principles of archaeological investigation to standing buildings of all types. He was one of the pioneers who created the discipline of 'church archaeology' as we know it today. He even coined the term.

In 1975 he was appointed as the first director of CRAAGS, the professional archaeological unit covering the counties of Avon, Gloucestershire and Somerset and led a major campaign of excavations and structural recording at Wells Cathedral (1978–93). In 1981 he set up in private practice as a consultant archaeologist and architectural historian, specialising in the investigation, recording and analysis of churches, cathedrals and major secular buildings of medieval and later date, including castles, palaces and country houses. His listed long-term consultancies include: Glastonbury Abbey (1976–2005), Bristol Cathedral (1976–2010), Wells Cathedral (1977–2015), Lichfield Cathedral (1982–2009) and Westminster Abbey (since 2004). He served as a member of the Council for the Care of Churches (now the Church Buildings Council, Church of England) (1976–86); a commissioner of the Cathedrals Advisory Commission (1981–90) and the Cathedrals Fabric Commission for England (1991–96); a member of Salisbury Cathedral Fabric Advisory Committee (1987–2006); a member of Exeter Cathedral Fabric Advisory Committee (1999–2006); a trustee of the Bath Archaeological Trust (1976–2005); and President of the Bristol and Gloucestershire Archaeological Society (1999–2000).

Rodwell was elected a Fellow of the Society of Antiquaries of Scotland in 1965, and the Society of Antiquaries of London in 1977. In 1988 he was awarded the latter Society's Frend Medal for distinguished service to church archaeology. In 1992 he was elected a Fellow of the Royal Historical Society, and in 1998 was made a Membre d'Honneur of La Société Jersiaise in recognition of his services to the archaeology of Jersey, where over a forty-year period he led numerous archaeological and restoration projects on the island's churches, castles and vernacular buildings. In 2002 he became a visiting professor in the Department of Archaeology at the University of Reading. In 2008 he was appointed as a member of the College of St Peter in Westminster, and is the first holder of the stall designated Archaeologus in the quire of Westminster Abbey. He was appointed OBE in 2009 for services to ecclesiastical archaeology.

Rodwell has studied and published many major ecclesiastical buildings, including Westminster Abbey,Canterbury Cathedral, Wells Cathedral, Bristol Cathedral, Lichfield Cathedral, Glastonbury Abbey and Dorchester Abbey (Oxon.). Between 1978 and 2007 he carried out a major research programme for English Heritage on the churches of Barton-upon-Humber (Lincs.).

From 1989 to 1995 Rodwell led the archaeological study and restoration of 'Hamptonne', a medieval farm complex in Jersey (now the island's Rural Life Museum), and from 1997 to 2005 he similarly led the study and restoration of Mont Orgueil Castle, Jersey's premier Ancient Monument. At Westminster Abbey, he was the progenitor of the scheme to create The Queen's Diamond Jubilee Galleries in the eastern Triforium (2014–18), and the scheme to excavate and rebuild the demolished great sacristy of Henry III, the construction of which began in 2025 and is designated as The King Charles III Sacristy.

He has also lectured widely, and periodically appeared in television programmes such as 'Time Team' and 'Restoration' (Channel 4).

== Personal life ==
In 1972 Rodwell married Kirsty Ann Gomer, a fellow archaeological student, and they worked and published together on archaeological projects in Essex and Lincolnshire; they divorced in 1983. In 1984 he married Christine Elaine Bensted, divorcing in 1999. In 2004 Rodwell married Diane Marie Gibbs, a wallpaintings conservator and museum curator. They lived in a Grade II Listed former vicarage in Somerset until 2014, when they relocated to Norfolk. There, they purchased a Grade II Listed manor house, which was derelict and had been unoccupied since 1955. From 2014 to 2023 they carried out a major programme of conservation and restoration. Rodwell also designed and built several additions to the manor house, including a library and an octagonal Gothick staircase tower and prospect chamber. The restoration won awards and the Listing grade was elevated to II*.

== Publications ==
Rodwell has published extensively: books, academic monographs, pamphlets, articles in learned journals and chapters in collective volumes. His total output since 1965 is understood to be well in excess of three hundred publications. Books and monographs include:

- The Small Towns of Roman Britain. ed. with T. Rowley. Oxford: British Archaeological Reports. 1975.
- Historic Churches: A Wasting Asset. with K. Rodwell. London: Council for British Archaeology. 1977.
- Temples, Churches and Religion: Recent Research in Roman Britain. 2 vols. ed. Oxford: British Archaeological Reports. 1980. ISBN 0-86054-085-5.
- The Archaeology of the English Church. London: Batsford. 1981. ISBN 0-7134-2590-3.
- Our Christian Heritage. with J. Bentley. London: George Philip. 1984. ISBN 0-540-01078-2.
- Rivenhall: Investigations of a Villa, Church and Village, 1950–77, Volume 1. with K.A. Rodwell. London: Council for British Archaeology. 1985. ISBN 0-906780-48-9.
- The English Heritage Book of Church Archaeology. London: Batsford & English Heritage. 1989. ISBN 0-7134-2590-3.
- The Fishermen's Chapel, Saint Brelade, Jersey: Its Archaeology, Architecture, Wall Paintings and Conservation. Jersey: Sociéte Jersiaise. 1990. ISBN 0-901897-19-1.
- The Origins and Early Development of Witham, Essex: A Study in Settlement and Fortification, Prehistoric to Medieval. Oxford: Oxbow Books. 1993. ISBN 0-946897-50-6.
- Rivenhall: Investigations of a Villa, Church and Village, 1950–77, Volume 2. with K.A. Rodwell. London: Council for British Archaeology. 1993. ISBN 1-872414-10-9.
- Les Ecréhous, Jersey. The History and Archaeology of a Channel Islands Archipelago. Jersey: Société Jersiaise. 1996. ISBN 0-901897-21-3.
- La Hougue Bie, Jersey. A Study of the Neolithic Tomb, Medieval Chapel and Prince's Tower. with M. Patton & O. Finch. Jersey: Société Jersiaise. 1999. ISBN 0-901897-29-9.
- The Archaeology of Wells Cathedral: Excavations and Structural Studies, 1978–93. 2 vols. London: English Heritage. 2001. ISBN 1-85074-741-5.
- Westminster Abbey Chapter House and Pyx Chamber. London: English Heritage. 2002. ISBN 9781850747918.
- The Archaeology of Churches. 3rd edn. Stroud: Tempus. 2005. 4th edn. Stroud: Amberley. 2012. ISBN 978-1-84868-943-5.
- Mont Orgueil Castle, Jersey. History and Architecture. Jersey: Jersey Heritage Trust. 2006.
- Architectural Records of Wells by John Carter, FSA, 1784–1808. with G. Leighton. Taunton: Somerset Record Society Monograph 92. 2006. ISBN 0-901732-40-0.
- Dorchester Abbey, Oxfordshire: The Archaeology and Architecture of a Cathedral, Monastery and Parish Church. Oxford: Oxbow Books. 2009. ISBN 978-1-84217-388-6
- Jersey's Houses, Castles and Churches: Building on the Stevens Legacy. Tenth Joan Stevens Memorial Lecture. Jersey: Société Jersiaise. 2009.
- Westminster Abbey Chapter House: The History, Art and Architecture of 'A Chapter House beyond Compare'. ed. with R. Mortimer. London: Society of Antiquaries. 2010. ISBN 978-0-85431-295-5.
- The Lantern Tower of Westminster Abbey, 1060–2010. Oxford: Oxbow Books. 2010. ISBN 978-1-84217-979-6.
- St Peter's, Barton-upon-Humber, Lincolnshire: A Parish Church and its Community. Volume I: History, Archaeology and Architecture. 2 parts. Oxford: Oxbow Books & English Heritage. 2011. ISBN 978-1-84217-325-1.
- The Archaeology of Churches. New edn. Stroud: Amberley Books. 2012. ISBN 978-1-84868-943-5.
- The Coronation Chair and the Stone of Scone: History, Archaeology and Conservation. Oxford: Oxbow Books. 2013. ISBN 978-1-78297-152-8.
- Westminster: The Art, Architecture and Archaeology of the Royal Abbey and Palace. 2 vols. ed. with T. Tatton-Brown. British Archaeological Association. 2015. ISBN 978-1-910887-28-8.
- The Cosmatesque Mosaics of Westminster Abbey. The Pavements and Royal Tombs: History, Archaeology, Architecture and Conservation. 2 vols with D.S. Neal. Oxford: Oxbow Books. 2019. ISBN 978-1-78925-234-7. These volumes won the London Archaeological Prize in 2020.
- Hamptonne and the Archaeology of Vernacular Houses in Jersey. Jersey: Societe Jersiaise. 2022. ISBN 9780901897930.
- Canterbury Cathedral, Trinity Chapel: The Archaeology of the Mosaic Pavement and Setting of the Shrine of St Thomas Becket. with D.S. Neal. Oxford: Oxbow Books. 2022. ISBN 978-1-78925-841-7.
- Northwold Manor Reborn: Architecture, Archaeology and Restoration of a Derelict Norfolk House. Oxford: Oxbow Books. 2024. ISBN 979-8-88857-134-7.
- Archaeology of Britain's Oldest Church Doors: Westminster, Hadstock and 'Dane-skins'. Oxford: Oxbow Books. 2025. ISBN 979-8-88857-229-0.

== Arms ==
Rodwell's armorial bearings are: Gules a mascle argent throughout embowed inwards between four feurs-de-lys apexes inwards and enclosing a cross flory or. Crest: Upon a helm with a wreath argent and gules, a cathedral façade triple towered the centre tower enhanced or, the port and windows gules statant upon each outer tower a dove reguardant that on the dexter contourny argent. Motto: Felicitas per Ardua.
