= Sack of Berwick (1296) =

Battle of the First War of Scottish Independence

- Part of the First War of Scottish Independence
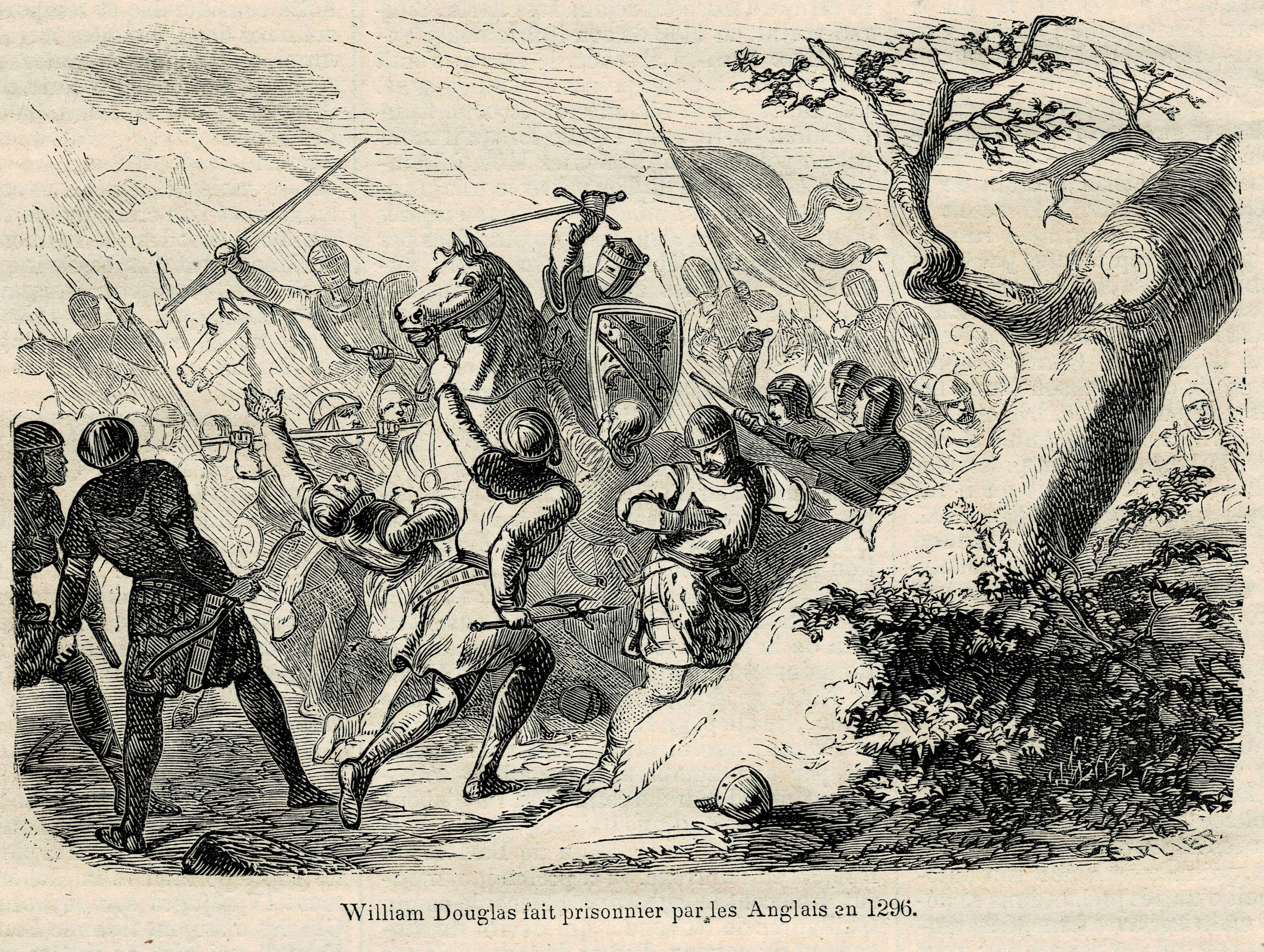
- The capture of William Douglas by the English in 1296.
Date	30 March 1296
Location	Berwick-upon-Tweed 55.775°N 2.013°W
Result	English victory

Belligerents
Kingdom of Scotland	Kingdom of England

Commanders and leaders
Lord of Douglas	Edward Longshanks

Strength
10,000 soldiers 12,000 civilians	30,000 soldiers 5,000 horses

Casualties and losses
c. 4,000 to 17,000 civilian and military	Light

The sack of Berwick was the first significant battle of the First War of Scottish Independence in 1296.

== Background ==
Upon the death of Margaret, Maid of Norway, in late September 1290, there arose a number of claimants to the throne of Scotland. The Guardians of Scotland were the de facto heads of state until a king was chosen. The late king, Alexander III of the Canmore line, had been married to Margaret of England, sister to Edward I, and he was asked to conduct the court proceedings in the dispute, though not to arbitrate; the decision was to be made by a jury of 104 "auditors".

John Balliol, a descendant of King David I, was chosen and was inaugurated at Scone, on St. Andrew's Day, 30 November 1292. Edward I treated Scotland as a feudal vassal state, claiming contributions toward the cost of the defence of England. When he demanded military support for his war against France, the Scots responded by forming an alliance with the French, and launched an unsuccessful attack on Carlisle.

== Battle ==
After the raid on Carlisle was committed by the seven invading Scottish earls (Buchan, Menteith, Strathearn, Lennox, Ross, Athol and Mar), the English, under Edward I, began the initial conquest of Scotland in the first phase of the war. On 28 March (the Wednesday in Easter Week), Edward passed the river Tweed with his troops and stayed that night in Scotland at the priory of Coldstream. From there he marched on the town of Berwick arriving on 30 March 1296.

Berwick, a royal burgh just north of the border, was Scotland's most important trading port, second only to London in economic importance in medieval Britain at that point. Berwick is referenced to be called "Alexandria of the North". Estimates also show that Berwick was, if not the most, one of the most populated towns in Scotland. Its garrison was commanded by William the Hardy, Lord of Douglas, while the besieging party was led by Robert de Clifford, 1st Baron de Clifford. Contemporary accounts of the number slain range from 4,000 to 17,000. Women by some sources were spared. Other accounts such as that of the monks of the English monastery of Lanercost say women were not spared. Much of the town was destroyed and the burgesses, merchants and artisans of the town were massacred

Much booty was seized, and no fewer than fifteen thousand of both sexes perished, some by the sword, others by fire, in the space of a day and a half.

— The Chronicle of Lanercost

Douglas surrendered the castle on the agreement that his garrison would be spared, but he was imprisoned.

When the town had been taken in this way and its citizens had submitted, Edward spared no one, whatever the age or sex, and for two days streams of blood flowed from the bodies of the slain, for in his tyrannous rage he ordered 7,500 souls of both sexes to be massacred.... So that mills could be turned by the flow of their blood.

— Account of the Massacre of Berwick, from Bower’s Scotichronicon

The Battle of Dunbar led to the English occupation of the Scottish Lowlands.

== Sources ==
- Grundy, John (2022). History of Northumberland. Newcastle upon Tyne: Tyne Bridge Publishing. ISBN 9781838280970.
