= Edward III's chevauchée of 1355 =

Mounted raid during the Hundred Years' War

- Part of the Hundred Years' War
Date	2 – 11 November 1355
Location	Picardy, France
Result	Inconclusive

Belligerents
Kingdom of England	Kingdom of France

Commanders and leaders
King Edward III	King John II of France

Strength
9,000–10,000	Unknown

Edward III's chevauchée of 1355 took place when King Edward III of England led an army into Picardy in the hope of provoking the French into a battle. Edward's son The Black Prince had begun a chevauchée on 5 October with an Anglo-Gascon force from Bordeaux heading towards Narbonne.

== Campaign ==
On 2 November 1355 King Edward III of England led an army of 9,000–10,000 men from the English enclave of Calais into French-held Picardy. He hoped to draw the larger French army, under the French king, John II, into a battle. John declined, ordering a scorched earth policy and harassing the English communications. After reaching Hesdin Edward returned to Calais on 11 November.

== Citations and sources ==
=== Sources ===
- Rogers, Clifford (2014) [2000]. War Cruel and Sharp: English Strategy under Edward III, 1327–1360. Woodbridge, Suffolk: Boydell Press. ISBN 978-0851158044.
- Sumption, Jonathan (1999). Trial by Fire. The Hundred Years' War. Vol. II. London: Faber & Faber. ISBN 978-0571138968.
