= Annabella Drummond =

Queen of Scots from 1390 to 1401

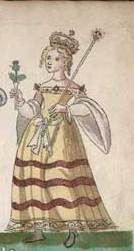
- Queen Annabella pictured in the Forman Armorial, 1562

Queen consort of Scotland
- Tenure: 19 April 1390 - October 1401
- Coronation: 15 August 1390
- Born: c. 1350
- Died: c. October 1401 (aged c. 50); Scone, Scotland
- Burial: Dunfermline Abbey
- Spouse: Robert III of Scotland (m. 1367)
- Issue: Margaret; Elizabeth; David; Mary; Robert; Egidia; James I of Scotland
- House: Clan Drummond
- Father: John Drummond of Concraig
- Mother: Mary Montifex

Annabella Drummond (c. 1350 - c. October 1401) was Queen of Scots, as the wife of King Robert III, from 1390 until her death. She exercised considerable political influence in Scotland, especially during the later years of her husband's reign. She was praised by her contemporaries, most notably by Andrew of Wyntoun.

== Life ==
Annabella was the daughter of John Drummond of Concraig, a landowner in the earldom of Lennox, and his wife Mary Montifex, the daughter of William Montifex, a knight who had signed the Declaration of Arbroath in 1320. The date of Annabella's birth is unknown. Based on the date of her marriage, it has been estimated in c. 1350. She was traditionally born at Dunfermline. Annabella may have served as a lady-in-waiting to Joan of the Tower, Queen of Scots, during Joan's residence in England in c. 1358.

Annabella's father, John Drummond, married Margaret Graham, Countess of Menteith, probably early in 1360, in a bid to secure influence in the earldom of Menteith. Drummond died later that same year. Annabella's fortunes were preserved by the rise of her aunt, Margaret Drummond, to favour at the court of King David II, first as the king's mistress and then, after 1364, as Queen of Scots. David II granted Annabella the sum of £20 in 1365, at which time she was resident in Stirling Castle, as a sign of his favour towards the Drummond family.

=== Marriage ===
On 13 March 1366, Pope Urban V issued a dispensation for Annabella to marry John Stewart of Kyle, the eldest son of Robert the Steward, who was heir to the throne of Scotland as a grandson of Robert the Bruce. Annabella and John were married by April 1367, likely with the support of the king. Later in 1367, John's father granted him the earldom of Atholl in recognition of his marriage. In 1368, David II gifted the earldom of Carrick to John and Annabella. The grant of Carrick may have represented compensation for David II's divorce from Annabella's aunt Margaret, which had been finalized by March 1369, and thereby reduced the political significance of John's marriage to Annabella.

After the death of David II in 1371, Annabella's father-in-law became King of Scots as Robert II. The birth of two daughters, Margaret and Elizabeth, to Annabella by 1373 provoked political tension in Scotland. At the demand of Robert II, the Parliament of Scotland passed an entail of the succession, restricting the right of Annabella's daughters to inherit the throne in favor of their uncle, Robert, Earl of Fife. Annabella gave birth to her first son, David, in 1378, thereby resolving concerns over the succession. Annabella's three eldest daughters were all married to various members of the Douglas family, as part of her husband's political alliances with William, Earl of Douglas, and his son James.

Annabella's husband John became regent of Scotland in 1384, on behalf of her father-in-law Robert II, who was declared incapable of exercising royal authority. Annabella's political influence was demonstrated in 1385, when her brother-in-law, Robert, Earl of Fife, was forced to surrender lands in Strathearn in favor of her cousin John Logie, the son of her aunt Margaret Drummond. Annabella's husband suffered a severe injury when he was kicked by a horse, probably in 1388. Shortly afterwards, Annabella's brother-in-law, the Earl of Fife, succeeded her husband as regent for Robert II. Robert II died on 19 April 1390, after which Annabella's husband became King of Scots, assuming the regnal name of Robert III.

=== Queen of Scots ===
Annabella was crowned as queen at Scone Abbey by John of Peebles, Bishop of Dunkeld, on 15 August 1390. In March 1391, parliament granted Annabella an annual pension of 2,500 merks, a notably large sum, for the maintenance of her court and entourage. As queen, Annabella maintained a correspondence with Richard II of England, writing two letters to him in 1394.

Annabella favoured the town of Inverkeithing, in Fife, as a royal residence, possibly residing in the building known today as Inverkeithing Friary. An elaborately carved baptismal font, given to the Church of St Peters in c. 1398 and decorated with the arms of the king and queen, has been associated with Annabella.

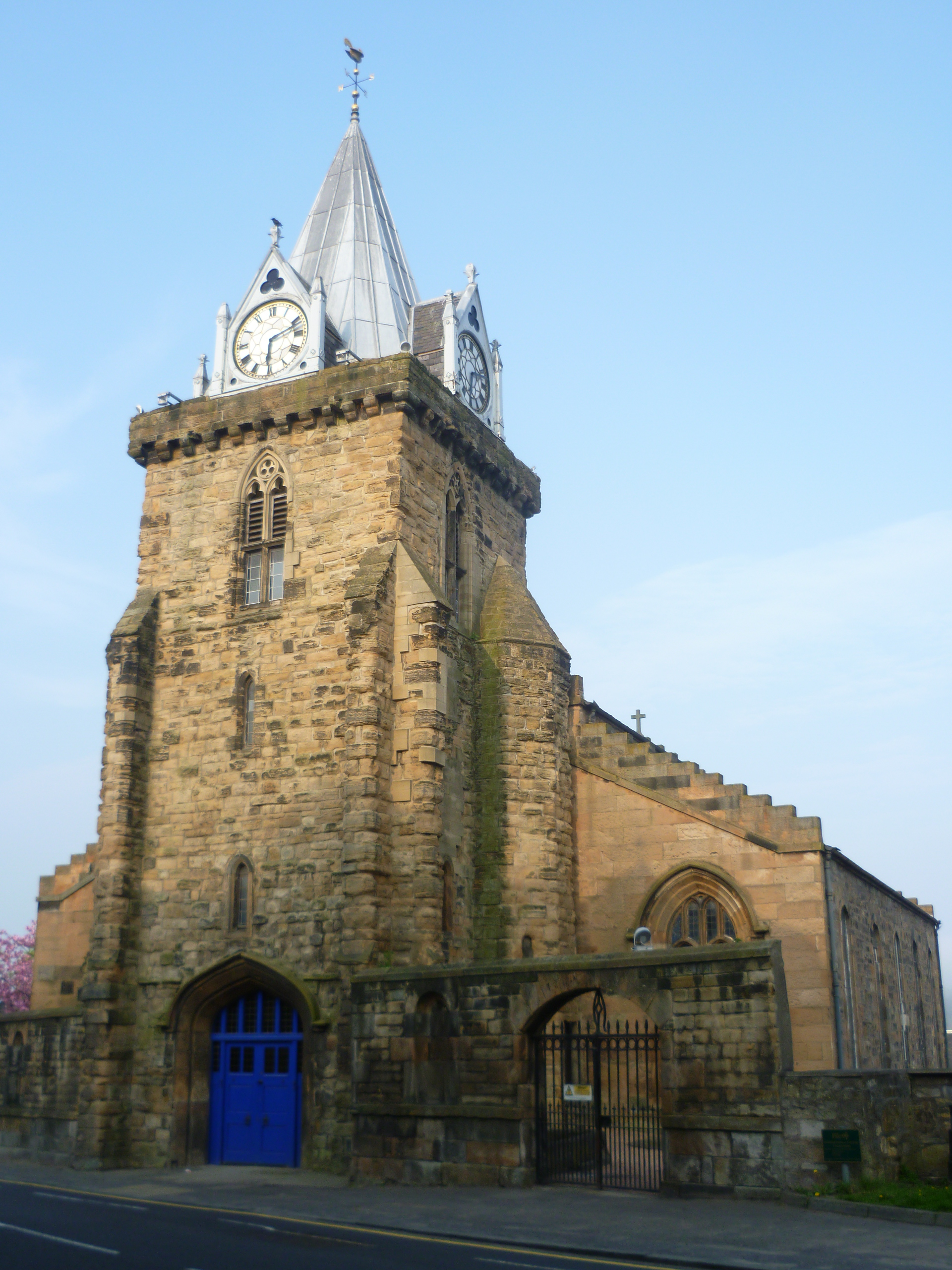
Annabella traditionally gifted a baptismal font, decorated with the Royal Arms of Scotland and those of the Drummond family, to Inverkeithing Parish Church.

In April 1398, Annabella attended a general council at Scone Abbey alongside her husband, where the king and queen listened to a sermon preached by Walter Trail, Bishop of St. Andrews, about the state of affairs in Scotland. At this council, Annabella's eldest son, David, was elevated to the title of Duke of Rothesay. Annabella was a crucial figure in David's rise to political prominence. Later in 1398, Annabella arranged a tournament in Edinburgh, where David was knighted. By this time, Annabella's husband was facing severe criticism over his governance of Scotland. Probably with Annabella's implicit support, Robert III was removed from power in 1399, allowing David to become regent of the kingdom. Annabella's brother, Malcolm Drummond, Lord of Mar, was also a prominent supporter of her eldest son's regency. Robert III's apparent chronic illness likely contributed to his decision to surrender power.

Annabella attended the general council that removed her husband from power, held at Perth in January 1399, where she formally complained that her brother-in-law, Robert, who had now become Duke of Albany, was abusing his office of Chamberlain of Scotland to prevent the payment of her annual pension. Annabella resided primarily in eastern Scotland, particularly at Dunfermline, during her later years, where her youngest son, James, was raised as a member of her household. Annabella died at Scone in late 1401, probably in October, as Andrew of Wyntoun described her death as occurring in "the harvest time". She was buried at Dunfermline Abbey. Prior to his own death in 1406, Robert III chose to be buried at Paisley Abbey rather than alongside Annabella's body at Dunfermline.

Andrew of Wyntoun and Walter Bower, who were both contemporaries of Annabella, were complimentary towards the queen. Bower, the author of the Scotichronicon, concluded that Annabella's death was an important factor in the downfall of her eldest son, David, shortly afterwards. In his Orygynale Cronykil of Scotland, Wyntoun described Annabella as "faire, honorabil, and pleasand; cunnand, curtays in her efferis; luvand, and large to strangeris."

== Issue ==
Annabella had seven children with Robert III:

- Margaret (c. 1370 - c. 1450), married Archibald Douglas, Duke of Touraine, 4th Earl of Douglas, and Lord of Galloway.
- Elizabeth (c. 1372 - c. 1411), married James Douglas of Dalkeith.
- David (24 October 1378 - 25/27 March 1402), Duke of Rothesay and Earl of Carrick, heir apparent to the Scottish throne until his death.
- Mary (c. 1380 - c. 1460), married first to George Douglas, 1st Earl of Angus, second to James Kennedy of Dunure, third to William Graham of Kincardine, and fourth to William Edmonstone of Duntreath.
- Robert (died c. 1393)
- Egidia (died c. 1417)
- James I of Scotland (July 1394 - 21 February 1437), who married Joan Beaufort.

Scottish royalty
Preceded by Euphemia de Ross	Queen consort of Scotland; 1390–1401	Succeeded by Joan Beaufort
