= Robert Stewart, Duke of Albany =

Scottish prince and statesman (died 1420)

Robert Stewart
- Duke of Albany; Earl of Fife and Menteith
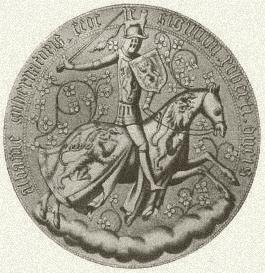
- The 1413 seal of the Duke of Albany as Governor of Scotland

Governor of Scotland
- Tenure: 1406 - 1420
- Successor: Murdoch Stewart
- Born: 1339; Scotland
- Died: 3 September 1420 (aged 81); Stirling Castle, Scotland
- Burial: Dunfermline Abbey
- Spouse: Margaret, Countess of Menteith (m. 1361; d. c. 1376); Muriella Keith (m. 1380)
- Issue more...: Murdoch, Duke of Albany; John, Earl of Buchan
- House: Stewart (Albany branch)
- Father: Robert II of Scotland
- Mother: Elizabeth Mure

Robert Stewart (1339 - 3 September 1420) was a Scottish prince and nobleman who ruled the Kingdom of Scotland as its effective monarch, under the title of Governor of Scotland, from 1406 until his death. Robert governed on behalf of his exiled nephew, King James I. Prior to his tenure as governor, Robert acted as regent at various times for his father, King Robert II, and his eldest brother, King Robert III.

The most powerful nobleman in Scotland for much of his life, Robert held the titles of Duke of Albany, Earl of Fife, and Earl of Menteith. His rule saw extensive warfare with the Kingdom of England, which was intertwined with both the Anglo-Scottish Wars and the Hundred Years' War, along with conflict in northern Scotland against the Lordship of the Isles. A ruthless politician, he was widely blamed for the death of his nephew, David, Duke of Rothesay, in 1402. Robert's rule witnessed architectural and cultural developments in Scotland, including the construction of Doune Castle and the establishment of the University of St Andrews, the first such institution in the kingdom. Robert's support of Antipope Benedict XIII during the Western Schism provoked domestic and international controversy. After his death in 1420, Robert was succeeded as governor by his eldest son, Murdoch.

== Early life and career ==
Robert was born in 1339. He was the third son of Robert Stewart, High Steward of Scotland, a grandson of Robert the Bruce and the heir presumptive to the Scottish throne. Robert's mother was Elizabeth Mure, the daughter of Adam Mure of Rowallan, a landowner in Ayrshire. Prior to his birth, Robert's parents had entered into a secular marriage, which was not recognized by the Catholic Church. After their father appealed to Pope Clement VI, Robert and his siblings were legitimated in 1347. Robert's mother probably died during the early 1350s.

Robert was born during the reign of his paternal great-uncle, David II of Scotland. David II was captured at the Battle of Neville's Cross in 1346, during a failed Scottish invasion of England, after which a general council elected Robert's father as regent of Scotland. David II was unable to negotiate his return to Scotland until 1357, when he paid a ransom of 100,000 merks for his release from captivity. Robert was likely sent to England as one of the mandated hostages for his great-uncle's ransom in 1358. Robert's detention was brief, and he was exchanged shortly afterwards for his eldest brother, John Stewart of Kyle, who remained in England for several years.

=== First marriage ===
Robert married Margaret Graham, Countess of Menteith, as her fourth husband, around September 1361. Their first child, Murdoch, was born in 1362. Robert initiated his longstanding political alliance with Duncan, Earl of Lennox, by naming Duncan as Murdoch's godfather. Margaret's marriage to Robert was a political reverse for David II, who had sought to prevent Stewart control of Menteith by promoting the Drummond family in the earldom. David II expressed his opposition to Robert's marriage to Margaret by denying him the title of Earl of Menteith. Robert was instead forced to style himself as Lord of Menteith. In the wake of these events, David II likely regarded his marriage to Margaret Drummond in 1364 as a challenge to the power of the Stewart dynasty.

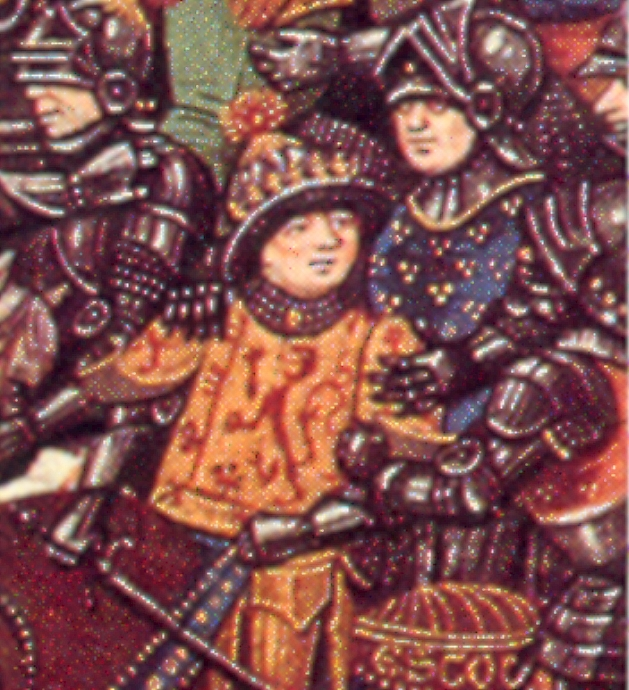
Robert's great-uncle, David II of Scotland, whom he rebelled against in 1363.

=== Rebellion of 1363 ===
In early 1363, Robert took part in a rebellion against David II, which included his father, Robert the Steward, his eldest brother, John Stewart of Kyle, and a coalition of noblemen including William Douglas, Earl of Douglas, and Patrick Dunbar, Earl of March. The rebellion against David was sparked by the local political concerns of the Scottish nobility. Robert's father opposed David's interference in the earldom of Fife, where Robert's elder brother, Walter, had briefly married Isabella, Countess of Fife. After Walter's death in 1362, the king forced Isabella to marry the crusader Thomas Bisset, a prominent knight at the royal court. Besides his father's dispute with David over Fife, Robert himself was probably angered by the marriage of Archibald the Grim, the king's favorite knight, to Joanna Murray in 1362. As the daughter of Maurice, Earl of Strathearn, Joanna was the heiress to considerable lands in Menteith, and the marriage disrupted Robert's own claims to the earldom by right of his wife.

The Earl of Douglas likely led armed opposition to the king. Deploying an army of paid retainers and cavalry, David II quickly defeated the rebellion. Robert's father was forced to submit to David II at Inchmurdoch on 14 May 1363. During the rebellion, Robert himself may have fought against Archibald the Grim, who supported the king, over their competing claims to the Murray inheritance in Menteith.

=== Later reign of David II ===
Robert was named, alongside his father, as one of the noblemen who would remain at Scone to conduct the business of the parliament of 1367, while other members of the nobility returned home for the harvest. Robert appeared at another parliament in June 1368, where he unsuccessfully attempted to pursue his dispute with Archibald the Grim over the Murray inheritance. David II ordered Robert to argue his legal case against Archibald in a lesser court than parliament.

David II attended the parliament of 1368 in person, where he warned Robert "in his own voice" not to aid the supporters of John of Islay, Lord of the Isles, with whom he was now in conflict. Robert was summoned to parliament at Perth in March 1369, where he swore an oath to uphold law and order in the earldom of Menteith, probably in connection with the conflict in the north. Robert, his eldest brother, and his father were faced with the penalties of treason for disobeying this oath. Robert's father was imprisoned by David II at Lochleven Castle around this time, possibly as a result of the Stewart family's alliance with John, Lord of the Isles. Robert himself may have been briefly imprisoned, while his younger brother, Alexander, was certainly sent to Lochleven alongside their father.

David II died at Edinburgh Castle on 22 February 1371, and Robert's father, Robert the Steward, succeeded as King of Scots. Robert's father was crowned as King Robert II at Scone Abbey on 26 March 1371. Robert attended the coronation, where he swore a personal oath of fealty to his father. By the time of the coronation, Robert's father had already allowed him to assume the full title of Earl of Menteith.

=== Acquisition of Fife ===
The recognition of Robert's full rights in Menteith was the prelude to his rapid rise to prominence in Scotland. Robert's ascendance was supported by his father as part of the king's policy of establishing each of his sons as great noblemen, with significant lands and titles. Robert met with Isabella, Countess of Fife, in Perth, shortly after his father's coronation. At this meeting, Robert secured Isabella's support for his claims to the earldom of Fife, as heir to his elder brother, Walter, who had briefly been married to Isabella. Despite Isabella's support for his claims to Fife, Robert's legal dispute with the nominal Lord of Fife, John Dunbar, lasted for more than a year. Robert's father helped negotiate a political compromise in 1372, whereby Robert assumed the title of Earl of Fife and Dunbar was created Earl of Moray in compensation. Robert was calling himself Earl of Fife by April 1372. Robert's acquisition of Fife reflected his status as one of the most important noblemen in Scotland, second only to his eldest brother, John, Earl of Carrick, the heir to the throne.

In 1373 the Parliament of Scotland declared that Robert and his eldest son, Murdoch, would have precedence in the royal succession over Robert's nieces, Margaret and Elizabeth, the daughters of his eldest brother, John, Earl of Carrick. Robert's rivalry with his eldest brother was probably fuelled by the succession law of 1373. Robert was second in line to the Scottish throne until the birth of his nephew, David, in 1378.

=== Increasing prominence ===
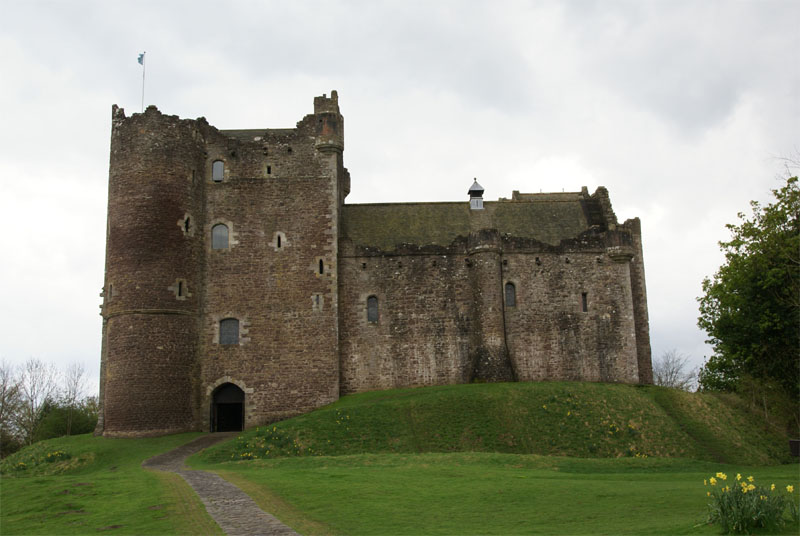
Doune Castle, which Robert built beginning in the 1370s, still stands today.

Probably during the 1370s, Robert began the construction of Doune Castle, which became the seat of his earldom of Menteith. Robert built his new castle on the site of an earlier fortification, which may have been built by his collateral ancestor, Walter Bailloch. Robert's architectural works at Doune, which included a large, self-enclosed keep, bore similarities to contemporary European noble residences, such as the Château de Pierrefonds. Robert probably intended Doune to serve as a compliment to nearby Stirling Castle, which he controlled after 1373. Robert's construction of Doune also allowed him to consolidate his hold on Menteith. As his influence in the earldom grew, Robert may have begun to patronize the local cult of St. Fillan. Robert's anxiety over his position in Menteith was likely driven by the death of his wife, Margaret, Countess of Menteith, on an unknown date in c. 1376. Robert continued to use the title of Earl of Menteith after his wife's death, and successfully ignored the rights of his wife's children by John Drummond to inherit Menteith, likely with his father's support.

Robert participated in march days, meetings of Scottish and English representatives to settle disputes in the Debatable Lands, alongside his eldest brother, during the late 1370s. In 1378, Robert and his younger brother, David, Earl of Strathearn, fought alongside Archibald the Grim in a battle at Melrose against an English raiding party. Robert's cooperation with Archibald in the 1378 campaign signaled the improved relationship between the two men, after Robert II had officially recognized Archibald's claim to the Murray inheritance.

=== Second marriage ===
Robert's first wife, Margaret, died in c. 1376. In May 1380, Robert obtained a dispensation from the Avignon antipope, Clement VII, to marry Muriella Keith, a daughter of William Keith, the hereditary Great Marischal of Scotland. Little is known about Muriella. Robert's eldest child by Muriella, John, was born in c. 1381. Robert developed a close relationship with his father-in-law, William Keith, after 1380, and the two men were frequently in each other's company. Robert's marriage to Muriella allowed him to develop a close political alliance with the Keith family, which was influential in north-eastern Scotland. Robert's support enabled William Keith to build a tower house at Dunnottar.

=== Brother's seizure of power ===
Robert became Chamberlain of Scotland in 1382, after the assassination of the previous chamberlain, John Lyon of Glamis.

By 1382, Robert II was facing opposition to his rule from powerful segments of the Scottish nobility, most notability the affinity of his eldest son, John, Earl of Carrick, along with various members of the Douglas family. The king was criticized for his controversial promotion of his fourth son, Robert's younger brother Alexander, in the earldom of Ross in 1382. Meanwhile, a period of developing conflict between Scotland and England led directly to an English invasion of Scotland in 1384. The English army, led by John of Gaunt, devastated the region of East Lothian. Robert II was criticized for his response to the English invasion, which was viewed as prevaricating and indecisive. John, Earl of Carrick, took advantage of his father's political difficulties to seize power in November 1384. During a general council at Holyrood Abbey, Robert II effectively abdicated much of his authority to his eldest son, who was named as Guardian of Scotland.

Robert attended the general council of 1384, where he swore an oath to support his eldest brother's assumption of power. Despite his initial support for the regency, Robert's interests were threatened by his brother's rule of Scotland. John, Earl of Carrick, abused his position as guardian to take large sums of money from the Scottish exchequer, challenging Robert's authority as chamberlain. Robert, probably supported by the king, gained substantial control over the exchequer session of 1385, held at Stirling Castle, where he punished the financial officials who had submitted to his eldest brother. Robert's eldest brother also faced criticism for his failure to curb the territorial or official power of their controversial younger brother, Alexander, in northern Scotland.

=== Conflict with England ===
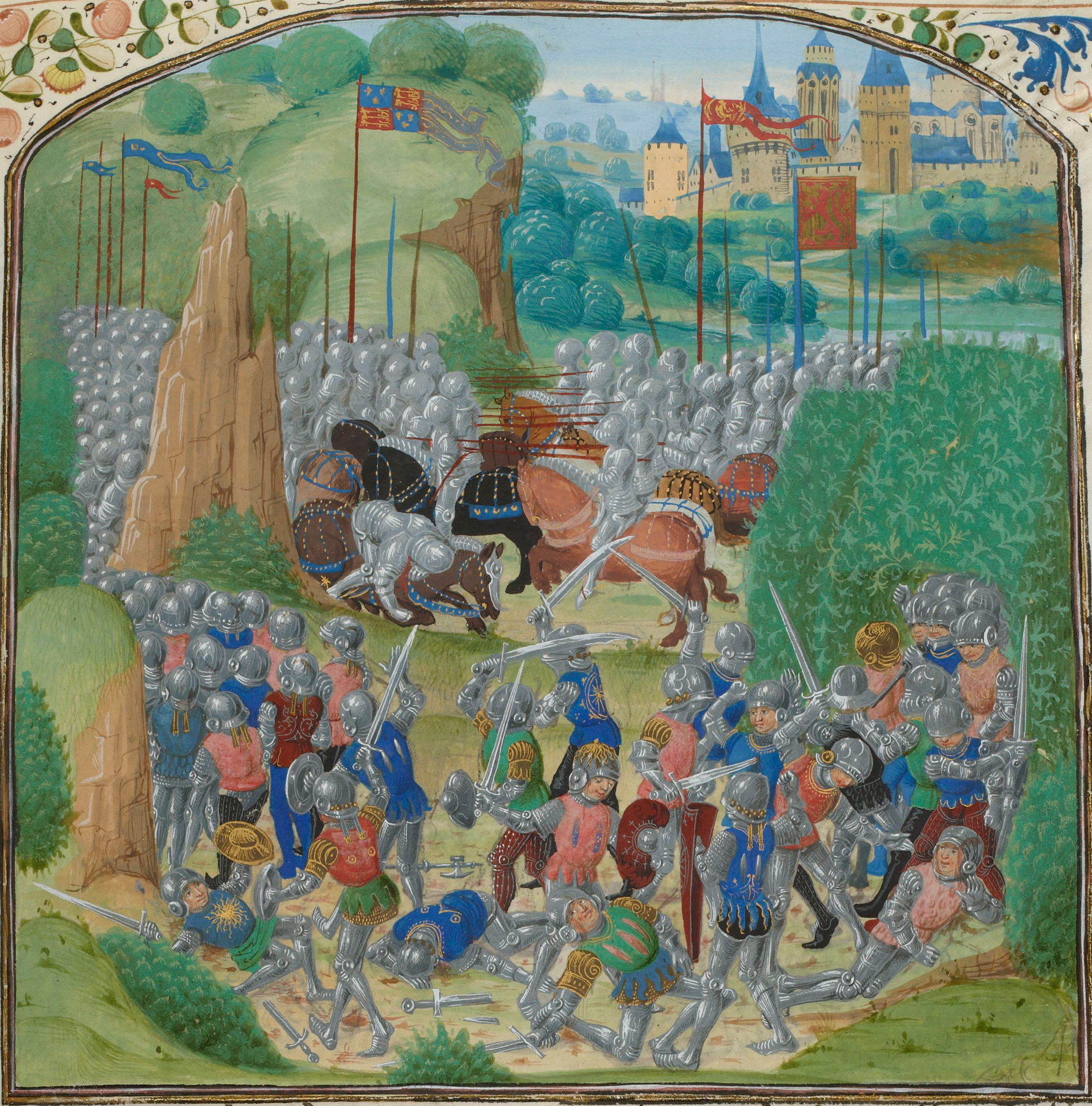
The Battle of Otterburn in 1388, which allowed Robert to outmaneuver his eldest brother for the regency.

The Anglo-Scottish conflict was resumed in 1385, amidst the ongoing Hundred Years' War between England and France. Jean de Vienne, Admiral of France, arrived in Scotland in May 1385 with an expeditionary force of French knights, along with a large sum of money which was distributed among Robert, his eldest brother, and other Scottish noblemen. Robert joined the combined Franco-Scottish army that invaded England during the summer of 1385, attacking Wark Castle and Ford Castle. This Scottish attack led directly to a massive retaliatory English invasion, led personally by Richard II of England. The English army burned Edinburgh and other Scottish towns, after which an Anglo-Scottish truce was agreed, ultimately lasting until 1388.

Robert played a significant role in the renewal of war with England. Joined by James, Earl of Douglas, and Archibald the Grim, Robert led a Scottish army in an attack on Cockermouth in the summer of that year. After the raid on Cockermouth, the decision was apparently taken to divide the Scottish army into western and eastern forces. Robert led the western army in an attack on Carlisle on 3 August 1388. The eastern army, led by the Earl of Douglas, confronted an English force at the Battle of Otterburn on 5 August, where the earl was killed in the resulting Scottish victory.

== First regency ==
Robert's eldest brother, John, Earl of Carrick, faced a political crisis in the aftermath of the Battle of Otterburn. The death of his prominent ally, James, Earl of Douglas, was coupled by a severe injury he had suffered when he was kicked by a horse, probably in the summer of 1388. During his regency, the Earl of Carrick had also faced criticism over his governance of northern Scotland. Robert took advantage of his brother's political difficulties to seize power in Scotland during the last months of 1388. Robert's decision to support the claim of Archibald the Grim, an illegitimate son of Sir James Douglas, to the earldom of Douglas was crucial to his success. Robert's brother supported the unsuccessful claim of Malcolm Drummond, his brother-in-law, to the earldom. By November 1388, Archibald and his allies had gained the upper hand in the legal struggle over the Douglas inheritance, indicating the general ascendancy of Robert over his brother at this time.

Robert's rise to eclipse his eldest brother culminated on 1 December 1388, when the Scottish parliament appointed him as Guardian of Scotland, replacing John, Earl of Carrick, in this office. Robert's assumption of the regency in 1388 confirmed the effective abdication of his father, Robert II, who remained king only in name. Robert's appointment as guardian was justified by his brother's physical infirmity, along with the fact that his nephew, David, was still underage. Parliament forced Robert to accept various conditions at the beginning of his regency, including a statute that John, Earl of Carrick, could reclaim power if he was proven to have recovered his health. Despite these limitations, the events of December 1388 marked the beginning of Robert's political dominance of Scotland.

Robert sought control of Tantallon Castle after becoming guardian. In January 1389, Robert reached an agreement with Margaret, Countess of Angus, who had lived in the castle for over a decade as the mistress of William, Earl of Douglas, that recognized her continued residency there while securing his own access to the castle. Robert moved quickly after his assumption of power to support his ally, Archibald the Grim, in the latter's claims to the earldom of Douglas. Malcolm Drummond, the other claimant to the earldom, attempted to gain Robert's favour early in 1389, but was forced to flee to England later that year. Archibald the Grim was recognized as Earl of Douglas in April 1389, confirming his political alliance with Robert.

=== Anglo-Scottish war (1389) ===
The victory of Robert and his ally, Archibald the Grim, in the legal battle over the Douglas inheritance provoked renewed war between England and Scotland in 1389. Malcolm Drummond, who had fled to England in the spring of 1389, secured the support of Richard II for his claim to the earldom of Douglas. An English army led by Thomas, Earl of Nottingham, invaded Scotland in July 1389, but was confronted by a larger Scottish army under the command of Robert and Archibald the Grim, the new Earl of Douglas. The English retreated, rather than fight Robert's army in a pitched battle. In the wake of this confrontation, Robert agreed to a new truce with England, as part of the wider Truce of Leulinghem. Robert may have used his father, Robert II, as a figurehead to deflect popular opposition to Scotland's inclusion in this truce. The king presided over a meeting of Scottish, English, and French representatives at Dunfermline Abbey in August 1389, and Robert likely sought to downplay his own involvement in these negotiations.

=== Northern policy ===
At the beginning of Robert's regency in 1388, the Scottish parliament removed his younger brother, Alexander, Earl of Buchan and Ross, from his powerful office of Justiciar North of the Forth, which held judicial powers over a wide region of northern Scotland. Robert supported this political attack on his younger brother, likely as a response to years of complaints about Alexander's exercise of authority in the Scottish Highlands. Robert had replaced Alexander as justiciar with his eldest son, Murdoch, by April 1389. Robert also secured extensive lands for Murdoch in the earldom of Atholl, representing a direct challenge to Alexander's power in the earldom, particularly in the Appin of Dull. Robert's assertion of his influence in Atholl created disputes between his immediate family and Clan Robertson.

Robert visited Inverness towards the end of 1389, where he attempted to convince John Dunbar, Earl of Moray, and Alexander Bur, Bishop of Moray, to end their long-running dispute and coordinate their actions against Alexander, Earl of Buchan. Around the same time, Robert supported Euphemia, Countess of Ross, after she submitted formal complaints against Alexander for adultery in an ecclesiastical court. Robert's exercise of power was interrupted by the death of his father, the elderly Robert II, at Dundonald Castle on 19 April 1390. Robert's authority as guardian expired at the moment of his father's death, while his eldest brother, John, Earl of Carrick, now succeeded Robert II as King of Scots.

== Second regency ==
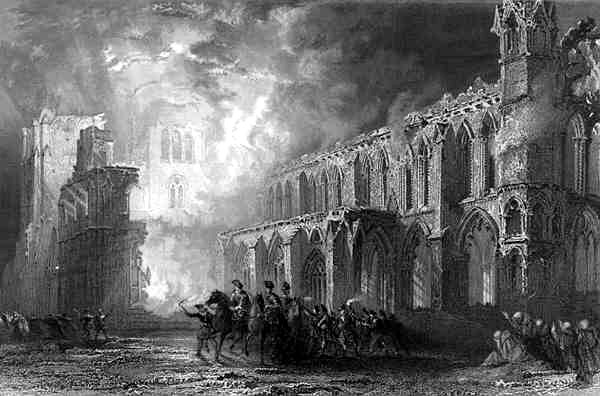
The burning of Elgin Cathedral in 1390, conducted by Robert's younger brother, Alexander, the "Wolf of Badenoch".

Despite the death of his father in 1390, Robert was able to reclaim his position as regent of Scotland. In May 1390, before his eldest brother had been crowned as king, Robert was reappointed as Guardian of Scotland by a general council meeting at Linlithgow. The continuation of Robert's regency may have been difficult to justify, but the infirmity of his eldest brother and the need to defend Scotland from an expected English attack were both likely mentioned in his defense. Robert's new regency was opposed by his younger brother, Alexander, Earl of Buchan, whose interests had come under attack during Robert's previous regency. Alexander burned Elgin Cathedral in June 1390, probably as a protest against Robert's reappointment as guardian, after which he was excommunicated. Robert's eldest brother was finally crowned at Scone on 14 August 1390, taking the regnal name of Robert III, after tensions in the north had calmed. In the presence of Robert and other noblemen, Alexander was released from his excommunication during the coronation.

Robert's acquisition of Urquhart Castle in 1391, against the wishes of Alexander, signaled his final assault on his younger brother's position in the earldom of Ross. In 1392, with Robert's support, Alexander's wife, Euphemia, Countess of Ross, succeeded in obtaining a divorce from the Avignon antipope, Clement VII. This divorce led to the collapse of Alexander's influence in Ross. Alexander's involvement in the infamous Raid of Angus in 1392 allowed Robert to present himself as the defender of law and order in the Scottish Highlands.

During his second period as guardian, Robert sought to advance his own interests in the Lennox. In 1392, Robert secured an agreement with his longtime ally, Duncan, Earl of Lennox, under which Robert's eldest son, Murdoch, would marry Duncan's daughter and heiress, Isabella, and become heir to the earldom of Lennox. Robert also augmented his personal influence in Scotland by negotiating the marriages of his daughters to prominent members of Clan Campbell and other families in Argyll.

By 1393, Robert enjoyed extensive wealth and influence in Scotland. He received an annual pension of at least 1,600 merks, along with a separate yearly payment of £200, from his offices of guardian and Chamberlain of Scotland. Despite his dominant position within the kingdom, Robert was forced to abandon his second regency in February 1393. Robert resigned his office of guardian, and returned power to his eldest brother, Robert III. The king's assertion of power in 1393 was probably aided by his son and heir, David, Earl of Carrick, who was now old enough to take an active part in government. An ongoing period of peace between Scotland and England, which had begun with the Truce of Leulinghem, also removed a primary justification for Robert's regency. Robert was willing to resign his office of guardian without challenging the king, probably because he was allowed to retain his other royal offices, while his strong position in the north was left intact.

== Political and foreign conflicts ==
Robert and his eldest son received additional pensions from the king after the end of Robert's regency in 1393. In 1393 and 1394, Robert received payments for his participation in the retinue of his nephew, David, Earl of Carrick, the heir apparent to the Scottish throne. Robert's nominal service in David's retinue, as part of which he formally pledged loyalty to his nephew, symbolized David's rising prominence in Scotland after 1393.

In the years after 1393, Robert continued to enjoy considerable influence within Scotland, although his political position came under increasing threat from his nephew, David. Robert's former political ally, James Lindsay of Crawford, entered David's affinity in c. 1393. Robert's relationship with Lindsay was damaged when he attempted to deny Lindsay's claim to the title of Lord of Buchan, which Lindsay was contesting with Euphemia, Countess of Ross, Robert's longtime political ally. Robert's tensions with Lindsay created difficulties in his relationship with his nephew, David, who had now become Lindsay's patron. David probably used his growing influence to challenge Robert's position as Chamberlain of Scotland. Robert was involved in serious legal disputes with the auditors of the Scottish exchequer by 1398. Robert's nephew, who had now become the most influential man in Scotland, likely instigated the auditors' actions against Robert. Robert probably abused his office of Chamberlain to withhold the annual pension owed to his sister-in-law, Queen Annabella, as a means of revenge against David.

=== Rise to a dukedom ===
The coat of arms which Robert assumed in 1398, after taking the title of Duke of Albany.

Robert joined a royal campaign in the Scottish Highlands in 1396, probably to restore law and order amidst a violent feud between Clan Cameron and the Clan Chattan. Robert served as joint leader of the campaign, alongside his nephew, David. The Battle of the North Inch, a staged battle between the two clans held at Perth in 1396, was probably an outcome of this campaign. In 1398, Robert was named as a leading Scottish ambassador in negotiations with John of Gaunt, the uncle of Richard II of England. Robert's continued prominence in Scotland was confirmed at a general council, held at Scone on 28 April 1398, at which his eldest brother, Robert III, elevated him to the new title of Duke of Albany. Robert's new title reflected the name of Alba, the Scottish Gaelic name for Scotland. Robert's preferences likely influenced the name of his new dukedom, which symbolized his desire to dominate northern Scotland, from the River Clyde to the Pentland Firth. At the same council, Robert's nephew, David, was given the title of Duke of Rothesay.

=== Royal campaign and coup (1398) ===
Robert was named to lead a new royal campaign in the Scottish Highlands in April 1398, at the same general council which confirmed his title of Duke of Albany. Robert was named alongside his nephew, David, Duke of Rothesay, and Thomas Dunbar, Earl of Moray, as a joint commander of this expedition. The general council expected Robert and his nephew to lead military forces against the family of Donald, Lord of the Isles, whose members had been raiding the lands of Moray. However, this campaign was interrupted when Walter Danielston, the castellan of Dumbarton Castle, rebelled against Robert III. Robert III besieged Dumbarton with a large army, but was unable to remove Danielston from the castle. The king's failed siege of Dumbarton contributed to the collapse of his political authority within Scotland. Amidst these events, Robert may have offered his implicit support to Danielston, who was a known associate of Duncan, Earl of Lennox, Robert's longtime ally and kinsman by marriage.

In the wake of his eldest brother's humiliation, Robert cooperated with his nephew, David, Duke of Rothesay, to remove the king from power. Robert hosted a meeting of Scottish noblemen and prelates at his residence of Falkland Palace, the primary manor of his earldom of Fife, in November 1398. Robert's guests at this meeting included his nephew, along with his eldest son, Murdoch, and a group including Archibald, 3rd Earl of Douglas, Walter Trail, Bishop of St. Andrews, and Gilbert Greenlaw, Bishop of Aberdeen. Robert and his ally, Archibald, 3rd Earl of Douglas, probably used this meeting to agree on a plan for David to assume power on his father's behalf. The discussions at Falkland led directly to the general council of January 1399, which forced Robert III to surrender his authority to David. David became regent of Scotland, under the official title of "lieutenant" of the kingdom.

=== Nephew's regency ===
The general council of 1399, which removed Robert's eldest brother from power, also named a group of twenty-one men who would advise the new regent, David, Duke of Rothesay. Robert was named as a member of this advisory council of "wise and loyal men", and may have been designated to lead the council. Although Robert supported his nephew's assumption of power in 1399, previous political tensions between Robert and David became relevant around this time. Robert's sister-in-law, Queen Annabella, attended the general council of 1399, where she formally complained that Robert, in his capacity as Chamberlain of Scotland, had prevented the payment of her annual pension. The general council ordered Robert to pay his sister-in-law's pension without further delay. Despite this dispute, Robert and Annabella may have achieved a personal reconciliation before the latter's death in 1401, prompted by their shared support of the coup of 1399.

==== English invasion (1400) ====
Henry IV of England launched an invasion of Scotland in 1400. The English invasion was directly provoked by David's marriage to Mary Douglas, a daughter of Archibald, 3rd Earl of Douglas. David's marriage represented a humiliating rejection of his previous betrothal with Elizabeth Dunbar, a daughter of George Dunbar, Earl of March. Following David's marriage early in 1400, George, Earl of March, pledged feudal homage to Henry IV, and asked for an English army to aid him against David. Henry invaded Scotland several months later, advancing to Edinburgh with an army of 20,000 men, while David and other Scottish noblemen retreated within the walls of Edinburgh Castle. Robert raised a large army to confront Henry, who was negotiating with his nephew in Edinburgh Castle. Although he marched his army towards Edinburgh, encamping at Calder for several days, Robert failed to engage Henry in a pitched battle. Walter Bower, the contemporary Scottish historian, claimed that Robert refused to support his nephew in the defense of Edinburgh Castle, possibly because he had initially opposed David's conflict with George, Earl of March. The English army withdrew from Scotland in August 1400, due to a lack of supplies. David's authority as regent was apparently unharmed by the invasion, although his conflict with George, Earl of March, had widely destabilized southern Scotland.

=== Coup against nephew (1401) ===
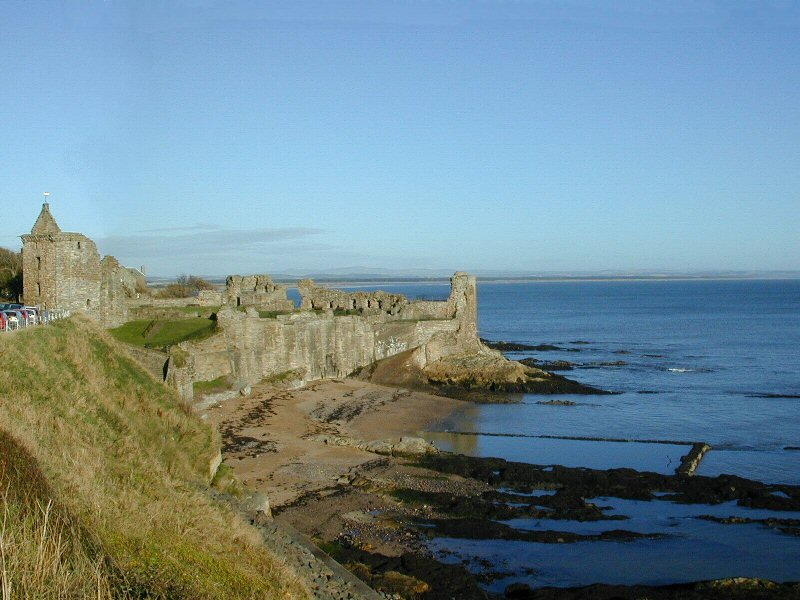
St Andrews Castle, where Robert briefly imprisoned his nephew, David, Duke of Rothesay, after arresting him in late 1401.

Robert attended the parliament held at Scone in February 1401. The influence of Robert's nephew was reflected in the legislation of this parliament, which seems to have been generally popular. Although David's governance of Scotland represented a positive contrast to that of his father, Robert III, his performance as regent became increasingly controversial during 1401. Robert's authority as Chamberlain of Scotland was threatened by David's aggressive fiscal policies. Having previously clashed with David over fiscal matters, Robert was probably offended when David took money directly from royal burghs, sometimes by violent means, during the summer of 1401. Robert was also angered by David's interference in his earldom of Fife after the death of Walter Trail, Bishop of St. Andrews, in July 1401. David attempted to gain control of St. Andrews Castle, in opposition to the bishop-elect, Thomas Stewart. David's actions were undertaken without consulting the council of twenty-one men, including Robert, who had been named to advise him in 1399. According to Walter Bower, David's refusal to cooperate with the council led to the mass resignation of its members.

Robert's relationship with David had collapsed by the end of 1401. Robert may have felt threatened by widespread rumors that David was planning to arrest him. Robert organized a preemptive attack against David towards the end of 1401, possibly in order to prevent his own arrest. David was arrested by members of his own retinue, who had probably been bribed by Robert, and was taken as a prisoner to St Andrews Castle. Robert then ordered David to be transferred into his personal custody in Falkland Palace. Robert also arranged for the arrest of David's maternal uncle, Malcolm Drummond, who was probably killed on his orders shortly afterwards.

Although he was able to imprison his nephew, Robert feared backlash from some of David's powerful allies, most notably David's brother-in-law, Archibald, 4th Earl of Douglas. Douglas was married to David's sister, Margaret, but his familial relationship with David had been damaged by political disagreements. Robert met Douglas at Culross, where the earl agreed to support Robert's arrest of David in exchange for various concessions. Robert was forced to promise the earl effective control of Anglo-Scottish relations. Robert may have gained the earl's blessing to murder David during the meeting at Culross. According to Walter Bower, Robert indulged his hostility towards his nephew by forcing him to ride to Falkland Palace on a mule, dressed as a monk in russet robes. After ordering David's initial imprisonment, Robert may have decided to kill his nephew out of fear that David, if he became King of Scots, would punish Robert for treason.

== Third regency ==
David, Duke of Rothesay, died in Robert's custody at Falkland Palace on 25 or 27 March 1402. Although it was claimed that David died of dysentery, most contemporaries believed that Robert had ordered his nephew to be starved to death. Robert probably faced formal accusations of murdering his nephew during a general council, called to discuss David's death, which met in Edinburgh in May 1402. Despite these tensions, Robert and his affinity were able to dominate the proceedings of the council. At the conclusion of the council, Robert was appointed as regent of Scotland for a period of two years.

After becoming regent in May 1402, Robert gained effective control of the Scottish royal court. By the autumn of 1402, Robert's eldest brother, the king, was surrounded on a daily basis by members of Robert's affinity, who were led by Robert's younger half-brother, Walter, Earl of Caithness. These men seem to have ensured that the king remained within the Stewart family's ancestral lands in southwestern Scotland. Robert may even have relied on Walter to physically detain their eldest brother, keeping Robert III under informal arrest.

=== Homildon campaign and aftermath ===
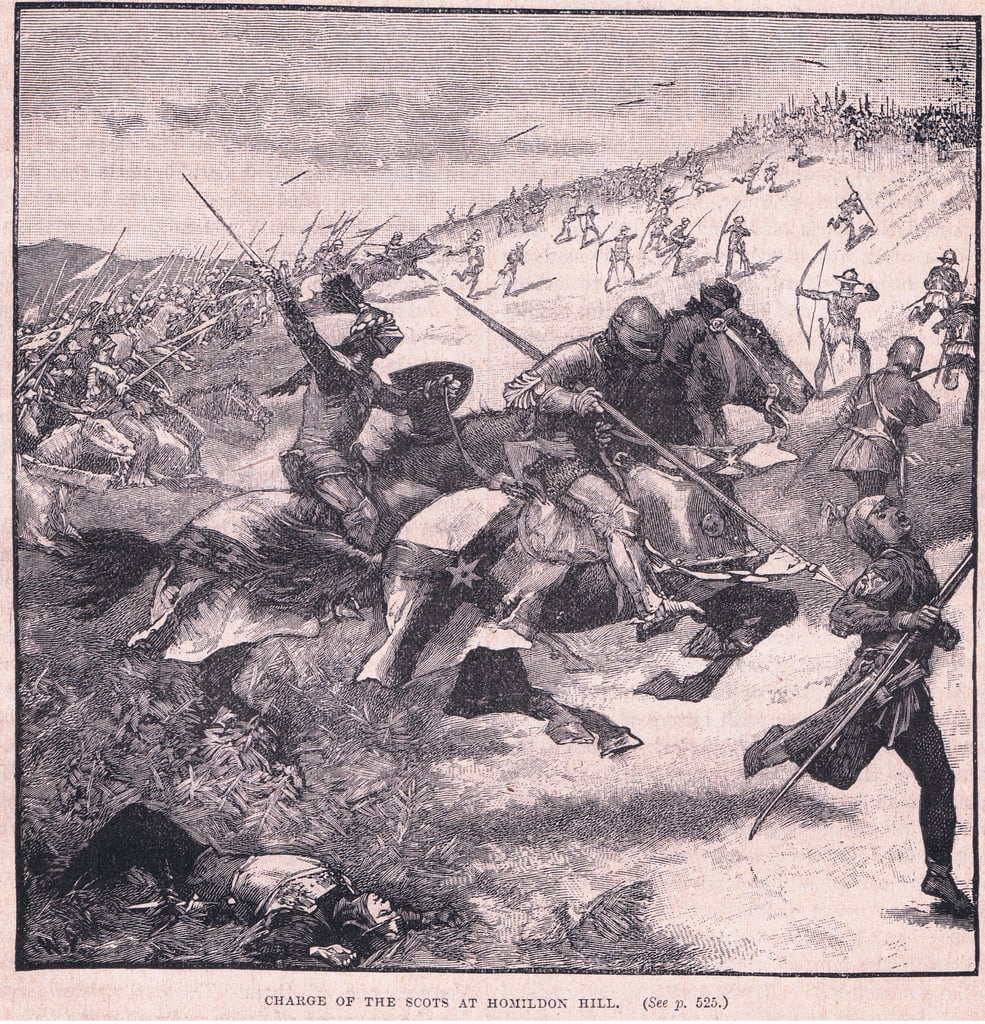
A Scottish cavalry force charges against English archers at the Battle of Homildon Hill in 1402. This Scottish defeat was a major event of Robert's third regency.

The beginning of Robert's third regency was accompanied by renewed conflict between Scotland and England. Archibald, 4th Earl of Douglas, to whom Robert had delegated substantial control over Scottish foreign policy, provided the impetus for this conflict. Douglas supervised two Scottish attacks on northern England during the summer of 1402. The second attack met with failure, as the Scottish army was defeated at the Battle of Nesbit Moor.

A new Scottish invasion, organized with Robert's personal support, culminated at the Battle of Homildon Hill, fought in Northumberland on 14 September 1402. Robert's eldest son, Murdoch, led the Scottish army alongside the Earl of Douglas. The battle resulted in a serious Scottish defeat. English troops captured both Murdoch and Douglas at the end of the battle.

The English victory at Homildon Hill left southern Scotland open to attack. Harry Hotspur, the son of the Earl of Northumberland, invaded Scotland with a large army in May 1403. Robert led a Scottish army south to confront Hotspur, who had besieged the tower house of Cocklaws, near Ormiston. Walter Bower reported that Robert overcame objections towards this campaign at a general council by delivering an impassioned speech in favor of battle. The impending confrontation between Scottish and English forces was averted when Hotspur, who had briefly joined his father's rebellion against Henry IV, was defeated and killed by the English king at the Battle of Shrewsbury.

Despite the apparent Scottish victory in 1403, intermittent conflict between the two kingdoms continued for several years. Robert promoted the claims of Thomas Warde, an impostor claiming to be the deposed Richard II of England, and paid for Warde to maintain a court at Stirling Castle. This attempt at a dynastic challenge failed when the council of Charles VI of France refused to accept Warde's claims. Robert also received ambassadors from Owain Glyndŵr, who was leading a Welsh rebellion against Henry IV. A new phase of open warfare began in 1405, coincidental with the major rebellion of Richard Scrope, Archbishop of York, against Henry IV. James Douglas of Balvenie, Robert's son-in-law and the brother of the imprisoned Earl of Douglas, led a Scottish army to plunder the city of Berwick-upon-Tweed, while Scottish and English naval forces clashed in the Irish Sea.

=== Dynastic politics and final ascent ===
Robert was reappointed as regent by a general council in April 1404, receiving a commission to govern Scotland for another two years. Robert's reappointment signaled his continued political dominance of Scotland, but his eldest brother, Robert III, began to re-emerge onto the political scene around this time. Robert III's renewed presence in Scottish politics after 1404 stemmed from the influence of three men - Henry Sinclair, Earl of Orkney, Henry Wardlaw, Bishop of St. Andrews, and David Fleming of Biggar - who had become established as a triumvirate of royal favorites.

Robert III had become severely ill by late 1405. Later historians, including Walter Bower, claimed that the king decided to send his only surviving son, James, to France around this time. This decision was allegedly driven by fears that Robert, who had already killed his eldest nephew, also sought to arrange James' death in order to succeed Robert III as king. Anxieties over James' fate collided with local political tensions in Scotland early in 1406. David Fleming of Biggar, the king's favorite knight, sought to challenge the power of Robert's political allies, the Douglas family, by taking James as a figurehead on a show of military force in East Lothian. James Douglas of Balvenie confronted Fleming with his own army and killed him in battle at Herdmanston on 14 February, after which James fled to the Bass Rock for safety. At this crucial moment, Robert's presumed hostility towards his nephew may have convinced James' advisors not to attempt his return to the Scottish mainland. A ship was instead chartered to bring James to safety in France. This desperate measure backfired when the ship was captured near Flamborough Head by English pirates. James was taken as a prisoner to the court of Henry IV.

Robert III died on 4 April 1406, shortly after hearing the news of his son's capture. With the death of his eldest brother, and the capture of his nephew, Robert, Duke of Albany, was once again the most powerful man in the Stewart dynasty.

=== First years as governor ===
Robert's nephew, James I, became King of Scots after the death of Robert III. James' captivity in England, however, forced the Scottish estates to recognize Robert's power as regent once again. Unlike on previous occasions, Robert adopted the title of "Governor" in 1406, and began to adopt many royal privileges. By 1410, Robert was using the style of Dei Gratia, traditionally reserved for kings, in diplomatic correspondence. For several years after becoming governor, Robert maintained the legal position that his nephew was merely the heir to the vacant Scottish monarchy, as he had never been crowned.

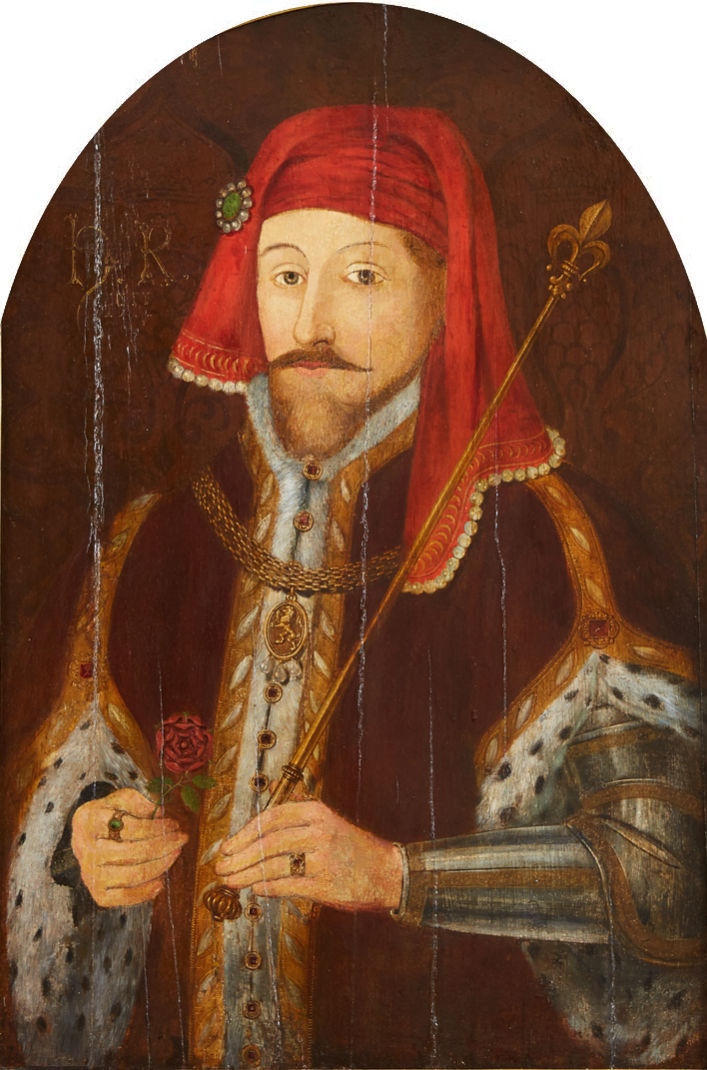
Henry IV of England, with whom Robert had a difficult relationship as governor.

Robert's main concern after becoming governor was the course of Anglo-Scottish relations. He sought to resume negotiations with Henry IV in December 1406, sending a large embassy to meet with the English king in London. Despite this diplomacy, and the captivity of his eldest son, Murdoch, in England, Robert's relationship with Henry IV was ambivalent. Robert seemingly reversed course in 1407 by allowing the exiled Earl of Northumberland, a rebel against Henry IV, to seek refuge in Scotland. The earl gathered an army and attacked northern England in February 1408, but was killed by Henry IV's forces. Archibald, Earl of Douglas, who had been released on parole from English captivity by Henry IV in 1407, initially swore to remain loyal to the English king, but quickly broke this oath. When his parole expired early in 1409, Douglas failed to return to England.

A Scottish army attacked and captured Jedburgh Castle in May 1409. Robert ordered Jedburgh, a symbol of the English occupation of southern Scotland since the Wars of Scottish Independence, to be destroyed after it fell into Scottish hands. Renewed naval conflict between Scotland and England erupted in 1409, when an English fleet led by Robert de Umfraville attacked the Firth of Forth. Henry IV opened negotiations with Robert in 1410, seeking to exchange Douglas for Robert's eldest son. These negotiations ultimately proved futile, as Douglas paid a large ransom to Henry IV to secure his freedom.

The major political event of Robert's first years as governor was the return of George Dunbar, Earl of March, from exile in England. The Earl of March, who had previously sought English support against Robert's late nephew, David, Duke of Rothesay, abandoned Henry IV in June 1408 and travelled back to Scotland. Robert accepted the Dunbar family's pledges of loyalty, and began attempting to reconcile Dunbar with his old enemy, the Earl of Douglas. Robert's support of Dunbar's return provoked a dispute with Douglas, which he sought to resolve by meeting the earl at Inverkeithing in June 1409. Renewed political discussions led to a final meeting between Robert, Douglas, and Dunbar at Haddington in October 1409. During this meeting, Robert supervised an exchange of land between Douglas and Dunbar as a mark of peace between the two noblemen. Robert arranged the marriage of his eldest son by his second marriage, John, Earl of Buchan, to Douglas' daughter in 1410, in a final sign of his rapprochement with the earl.

After 1410, Robert largely left the governance of southern Scotland in the hands of Archibald, 4th Earl of Douglas, the most powerful non-royal nobleman in the kingdom. Although he rebuked Douglas that same year for taking funds illegally from the Scottish exchequer, Robert allowed significant grants to be made to the earl for the remainder of his rule. Douglas effectively robbed Robert's regency government of large sums of money, and began abusing the customs revenue of Edinburgh to supply his personal income. The nadir of this difficult period for the royal finances came in 1418, when Douglas besieged Edinburgh Castle in order to arrest members of his own affinity who worked in the exchequer. Robert was unwilling to challenge the Douglas family or its strong affinity, and restricted his interference in southern Scotland to confirming the earl's charters with the Great Seal.

=== War in the north (1411) ===
Robert increasingly turned to Alexander, Earl of Mar, his illegitimate nephew, to provide security and political stability in northern Scotland after 1404. Robert relied on Mar's power in northeastern Scotland to defend against Donald of Islay, Lord of the Isles, another of his nephews. Donald, who had already ordered an attack on Elgin in 1402, opposed Robert's control of the earldom of Ross, which Robert claimed on behalf of his granddaughter, Euphemia Leslie. Donald promoted his own claim to Ross by right of his marriage to Mariota Leslie, Euphemia's aunt. Robert, in turn, was provoked by Donald's negotiations for a political alliance with Henry IV of England in 1408.

A depiction of the Battle of Harlaw in 1411, one of the most notable events of Robert's rule as governor.

The growing dispute between Robert and Donald culminated in open warfare early in 1411. Donald attacked and burned Inverness during the spring. Robert ordered Alexander, Earl of Mar, to raise forces to defend the earldom of Ross from Donald's army. Mar gathered an army of the men of Aberdeen, along with contingents of knights from Mar and Angus. The resulting Battle of Harlaw, fought near Inverurie on 24 July 1411, ended in a tactical stalemate. Both sides claimed victory, while over a thousand common soldiers and various commanders in both armies were killed. News of the inconclusive battle prompted Robert to march north with his own army in the autumn of 1411. Robert recaptured Dingwall Castle, expelling Donald's garrison, while the lord fled back to the Hebrides. Tensions flared again in 1412, when Robert confronted Donald at Lochgilphead and finally forced him to submit to his authority as governor.

=== Religious policy ===
Robert's tenure as governor was dominated by the Western Schism, a thirty-nine-year dispute over the legitimate occupant of the Roman Catholic papacy. Robert and his Stewart predecessors had supported the Avignon Papacy since the beginning of the Schism. Benedict XIII, the Avignon antipope, rewarded this loyalty in 1413 by granting a bull to establish the University of St Andrews, the first university in Scotland. Robert's continued support for the antipope grew increasingly controversial after 1414, with the opening of the Council of Constance, a renewed attempt to end the Schism.

Robert's position in favor of Avignon became untenable when the Council of Constance formally deposed Benedict XIII in July 1417. The election of Martin V as the legitimate pope shortly afterwards, officially ending the Schism, put further pressure on Robert. A general council ultimately convened at Perth in October 1418 for a final debate on the papal issue. Robert chose an English theologian, Robert Harding, to speak in his defense as the council discussed the status of Benedict XIII. Harding attempted to deny the legitimacy of the Council of Constance, but was refuted by various clergymen who spoke in support of Martin V. The general council ultimately decided to recognize Martin V as the legitimate pope, in a political and moral defeat for Robert.

Robert's religious policy included his persecution of Lollards, a Christian sect that practiced the teachings of John Wycliffe, an English theologian. Andrew of Wyntoun, the contemporary historian, noted Robert's strong defense of Catholic orthodoxy. Robert supported the execution by burning in 1407 of John Resby, an English priest and follower of Wycliffe, which was conducted by religious authorities.

=== Ransom and overseas war ===
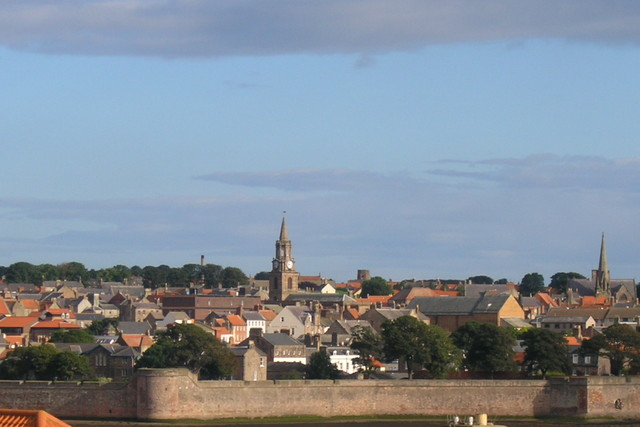
The town of Berwick-upon-Tweed, which Robert besieged in 1417 during his last military campaign.

After several years of relative peace, Anglo-Scottish relations deteriorated again following the accession of Henry V of England in March 1413. Robert's priority remained the safe release of his eldest son, Murdoch, who had now been held captive in England for over a decade. After becoming king in 1413, Henry V ordered Murdoch and his cousin, James I, to be transferred to a harsh confinement in the Tower of London. In contrast to his anxiety over his son, Robert showed little interest in the release of his nephew. James I complained in correspondence with Robert that nothing had been done to negotiate for his ransom from English captivity. Tentative negotiations for the king's return to Scotland, which were underway by the end of 1412, collapsed after Henry V's accession. Murdoch was finally released from captivity in February 1416, in exchange for a ransom of £10,000, while James I was left to remain in England.

Henry V's successful campaign against France, marked by the Battle of Agincourt in October 1415, provoked renewed aggression from Scotland, the traditional ally of France. Despite ongoing negotiations between Robert and Henry V, a Scottish army led by Archibald, 4th Earl of Douglas, attacked Penrith in 1415. Robert sanctioned a larger Scottish campaign in July 1417, after the release of his eldest son and Henry V's return to campaign in France. Robert led an army to assault the town of Berwick, while the Earl of Douglas attacked Roxburgh Castle with a second army. Robert besieged Berwick with primitive gunpowder artillery, but was unable to dislodge the English garrison. John, Duke of Bedford, quickly assembled an English army to confront the Scots, after which Robert abandoned his siege and retreated back over the Scottish border. The unsuccessful campaign of 1417 acquired the name of the "Foul Raid" within Scotland.

Despite the outcome of the Foul Raid, Robert continued to lend armed support to the Valois dynasty in its war with Henry V. Robert appointed his second son, John, Earl of Buchan and Ross, to command a Scottish expedition to France in 1418. After extensive preparations, an army of 6,000 men sailed from Scotland the following year, arriving at the port of La Rochelle in October 1419. Robert's support for Charles, Dauphin of France, formed another point of contention with his captive nephew, James I, who was now emerging as an honored figure at the English court. In order to demoralize the Scottish expedition, James I was taken to France early in 1420 as part of Henry V's army. The Scottish king lent his personal support to the Treaty of Troyes, which represented a severe defeat for the Valois cause, by attending Henry V's wedding to Catherine of Valois in June 1420.

== Death and succession ==
Robert appointed his eldest son, Murdoch, who had now assumed the courtesy title of Earl of Fife, as his "lieutenant" in 1417. The last years of Robert's life were marred by tensions within his immediate family, sparked by the death of Murdoch's own eldest son, also named Robert, in 1419. The succession to the earldom of Lennox was disputed between Murdoch and Walter, one of his younger sons. Murdoch unsuccessfully attempted to force Walter, who had become heir to the earldom as a grandson of Duncan, Earl of Lennox, to renounce his succession rights. The dispute between Robert's son and grandson would continue for several years after his death.

Robert died at Stirling Castle on 3 September 1420. According to contemporary historians, his death occurred amidst a severe epidemic of disease in Scotland. Walter Bower noted Robert's longevity and continued mental acuity at the time of his demise. Robert was buried between the choir and the chapel of Dunfermline Abbey. Robert's eldest son, Murdoch, quickly secured his own succession as governor.

Robert's second son, John, Earl of Buchan and Ross, was killed at the Battle of Verneuil in 1424, while leading another Scottish expeditionary force in the Hundred Years' War. Robert's legacy was ultimately destroyed when his nephew, James I, returned to Scotland in 1425. The king ordered the execution of Murdoch, Duke of Albany, and most of his male relatives. Robert's fourth son, also named Robert, survived the events of 1425 and became a royal pensioner, but was forced to surrender his claim to his father's inheritance. Robert's second wife, Muriella Keith, lived until 1449. Muriella continued to draw a pension as Duchess of Albany until her death.

== Issue ==
Robert married his first wife, Margaret Graham, Countess of Menteith, in c. 1361. They had seven children before Margaret's death in c. 1376.

- Murdoch (1362 - 25 May 1425), who succeeded his father as Governor of Scotland and Duke of Albany.
- Janet (d. c. 1379), who was betrothed to David de Leon, a knight at the court of Robert II, in July 1372.
- Margaret, who married John Swinton in 1392. Her husband was killed at the Battle of Homildon Hill in 1402.
- Mary, who married William Abernethy of Saltoun.
- Joan, also rendered as Johanna, who married Robert Stewart of Lorne in c. 1397.
- Beatrice (d. before 1424), who married James Douglas of Balvenie, the future Earl of Douglas.
- Isabella, who married Alexander Leslie, Earl of Ross, in c. 1398. After his death in 1402, she married Walter Haliburton of Dirleton.

Robert married his second wife, Muriella Keith, in 1380. They had five children.

- John (c. 1381 - 17 August 1424), Earl of Buchan and Ross. He was killed at the Battle of Verneuil.
- Andrew (d. c. 1413)
- Robert (d. after 1431)
- Marjory (d. before 1432), who married Duncan Campbell, 1st Lord Campbell.
- Elizabeth, who married Malcolm Fleming, the son of David Fleming of Biggar.

== Sources ==
- Boardman, Stephen (1996). The Early Stewart Kings: Robert II and Robert III, 1371-1406. Edinburgh: Tuckwell Press. ISBN 978 1 904607 68 7.
- Brown, Michael (1994). James I (First ed.). Canongate Press. ISBN 1-898410-40-2.
- Brown, Michael (1998). The Black Douglases: War and Lordship in Medieval Scotland (Second ed.). Tuckwell Press. ISBN 1-86232-036-5.
- Cannon, John; Cowcroft, Robert (2015). A Dictionary of British History (Third ed.). Oxford University Press. ISBN 9780191758027.
- Cannon, John; Hargreaves, Anne (2009). The Kings and Queens of Britain (Second ed.). Oxford University Press. ISBN 9780199559220.
- Davidson, John (1878). Inverurie and The Earldom of the Garioch: A Topographical and Historical Account of the Garioch from Earliest times to the Revolution Settlement. Aberdeen: A. Brown and Company.
- Penman, Michael (2004). David II. East Linton: Tuckwell Press. ISBN 1 86232 2023.
- Penman, Michael (2006). The Kings and Queens of Scotland (Second ed.). Stroud, Gloucestershire, UK: The History Press. ISBN 978 0 7524 3814 6.
- Nicholson, Ranald (1974). Scotland: The Later Middle Ages (Second ed.). Edinburgh: Mercat Press. ISBN 0901824 844.
- Seward, Desmond (2014). The Demon's Brood: A History of the Plantagenet Dynasty. Pegasus Books. ISBN 978 1 60598 618 0.
- Thomson, Thomas; Annandale, Charles (2023). A History of the Scottish People from the Earliest Times - Volume 2 (Reprinted ed.). Legare Street Press.
- Weir, Alison (1996). Britain's Royal Families: The Complete Genealogy. London: Pimlico.

Peerage of Scotland
New creation	Duke of Albany; 1398–1420	Succeeded by Murdoch Stewart
Preceded by Isabel Macduff	Earl of Fife; 1372–1420	Succeeded by Murdoch Stewart
Preceded by Mary Menteith	Earl of Menteith; 1361–1420; With: Margaret Graham	Succeeded by Murdoch Stewart
Preceded by Alexander Stewart	Earl of Buchan; 1394–1406	Succeeded by John Stewart
