= David Stewart, Duke of Rothesay =

Heir apparent to Robert III of Scotland (1378–1402)

David Stewart
- Prince of Scotland; Duke of Rothesay; Earl of Carrick and Atholl
- The arms of Prince David as Duke of Rothesay
- Born: 24 October 1378
- Died: c. 26 March 1402 (aged 23); Falkland Palace
- Burial: Lindores Abbey
- Spouse: Mary Douglas (m. 1400)
- House: Stewart
- Father: Robert III of Scotland
- Mother: Annabella Drummond

David Stewart (24 October 1378 - c. 26 March 1402) was the eldest son of Robert III of Scotland and his wife, Annabella Drummond. The heir apparent to the Scottish throne from 1390 until his death, David held the titles of Prince of Scotland, Duke of Rothesay, and Earl of Carrick. David was named by a general council to rule Scotland as regent, on behalf of his infirm and politically ineffective father, in 1399. He was responsible for the defense of Scotland during the English invasion in 1400. After coming into conflict with his uncle, Robert Stewart, Duke of Albany, David was arrested and removed from power in late 1401. He died in mysterious circumstances at Falkland Palace shortly afterwards. David's younger brother, James, eventually succeeded their father as King of Scots.

== Life ==
David was born on 24 October 1378. He was the third child and eldest son of John Stewart, Earl of Carrick, himself the eldest son and heir apparent of Robert II of Scotland and Annabella Drummond. David was probably named after his great-granduncle, King David II, who had supported his parents' marriage. David's birth in 1378 resolved tensions over the Scottish royal succession that had existed since 1373, when the Parliament of Scotland restricted the succession rights of his elder sisters, Margaret and Elizabeth, in favor of David's uncle, Robert, Earl of Fife, and his cousin Murdoch. At the moment of his birth, David became second in line to the Scottish throne.

David had received his own retinue by late 1386. David's retainers were drawn from among the political allies of his father, John, Earl of Carrick. David's father, who had been named as regent for his grandfather in 1384, was replaced in office by his uncle, Robert, Earl of Fife, in 1388. The Earl of Carrick's removal from power was justified by a declaration that he was physically incapable of governing, probably after he had been severely injured by a horse. The general council which met in Edinburgh in December 1388, with the purpose of removing the Earl of Carrick from the regency, observed that David was too young to exercise authority on his father's behalf. David's grandfather, Robert II, died in 1390, whereupon David's father became King of Scots under the regnal name of Robert III.

=== Rise to prominence ===
David was granted the title of Earl of Carrick after his father's accession. As heir apparent, David's household was controlled by his father, Robert III. The king appointed Thomas Mather, his former chaplain, as David's schoolmaster. David attained financial independence from his father in 1392, when he was granted a large annual pension of £640 from royal customs revenue.

The influence of the Douglas family, particularly the relatives of James, 2nd Earl of Douglas, in David's household sparked political tension. After James' death at the Battle of Otterburn in 1388, his lands had successfully been claimed by his cousin, Archibald the Grim, a close ally of Robert, Earl of Fife, in opposition to David's maternal uncle, Malcolm Drummond. By 1393, the presence of Drummond and his allies, particularly James Lindsay of Crawford, in David's entourage was viewed as a political threat by Archibald and Robert. David's uncle, the Earl of Fife, who had been reappointed as regent for Robert III in 1390, returned power to the king in February 1393, probably as a result of David's emergence into adulthood.

After 1393, David exercised an increasingly important role in Scotland, effectively performing many of his father's duties as king. David formally complained to Clement VII, the Avignon antipope, against the Abbot of Newbattle in 1394. In his petition to Avignon, David complained that the abbot, John, had been "exceedingly ungrateful" in his presence. Possibly in 1394, David assumed the title of Lord of Nithsdale. This was probably viewed by Archibald, 3rd Earl of Douglas, as a challenge to his own power in Galloway. David may have supported the Kennedy and Agnew families in their opposition to Archibald's authority within Galloway. In 1396, David led a royal campaign to restore law and order in the Scottish Highlands, amidst a violent feud between the Clan Chattan and another clan, possibly Clan Cameron. The Battle of the North Inch, a staged battle between the two clans held at Perth in September 1396, was likely the outcome of David's campaign in the north.

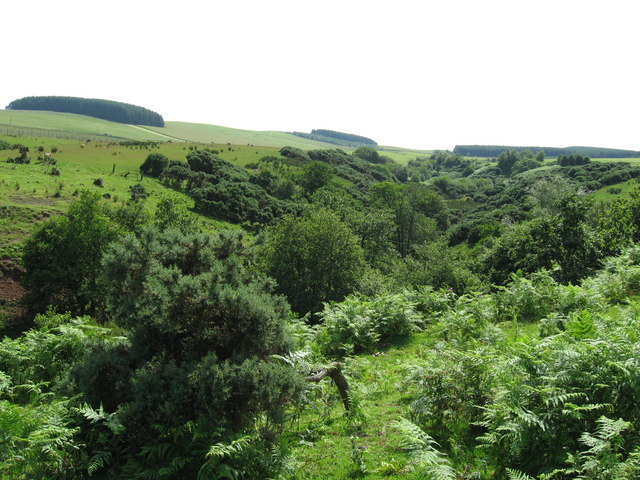
David negotiated with John of Gaunt over Scottish claims to Jedforest, pictured here, in 1398.

David enjoyed considerable authority within Scotland by the end of 1397. During the summer of that year, he openly challenged Archibald, Earl of Douglas, by supporting the marriage of his younger sister, Mary, to George Douglas, Lord of Angus, a member of the rival Red Douglas line of the Douglas family. David's political power was reflected in a complaint made by officials of the Scottish exchequer in Edinburgh in May 1397, around the time of his sister's betrothal to George, Lord of Angus. The officials accused David of taking royal funds without written permission, remarking that they did not dare to contravene his actions. David was named as a member of his father's council in 1397, and around that time he took a leading role in Anglo-Scottish diplomacy. In March 1398, David defended Scottish claims to Jedforest in negotiations with John of Gaunt, the uncle of Richard II of England. On 28 April 1398, during a general council at Scone Abbey, Robert III elevated David to the new title of Duke of Rothesay. David's influence was further reflected by the creation of his ally, David Lindsay of Crawford, as Earl of Crawford during the same council.

=== Marital disputes ===
David was betrothed to marry Elizabeth Dunbar, a daughter of George Dunbar, 10th Earl of March, by August 1395, when antipope Benedict XIII granted a dispensation to the couple. David's marriage to Elizabeth never took place. Robert III did not approve of his son's marriage. The king attacked Dunbar Castle, the seat of George, Earl of March, probably during the autumn of 1396, in order to prevent David's marriage to the earl's daughter. Robert III's opposition to the marriage forced David's prospective father-in-law, the Earl of March, to seek refuge in England during 1397. In March 1397, Benedict XIII issued a second dispensation to David and Elizabeth, suggesting that David had personally lobbied the antipope for permission to marry Elizabeth. Despite this dispensation, there is no indication that David and Elizabeth had contact with each other after 1397. Elizabeth's father, the Earl of March, still expected the marriage to take place as late as 1400.

David married Mary Douglas, a daughter of Archibald, 3rd Earl of Douglas, at Bothwell Castle in February 1400. Although he had previously supported his brother-in-law, George Douglas, in his violent raids on the estates of Archibald's allies in 1397, David now married Archibald's daughter as a sign of his reconciliation with the Earl of Douglas, a close associate of his uncle, Robert, Duke of Albany. David's repudiation of his betrothal to Elizabeth Dunbar led the latter's father, George, Earl of March, to complain to Henry IV of England that he had been "gretly wrangit" by the prince. This complaint was a major factor in the English invasion of Scotland later that same year.

=== Regency ===
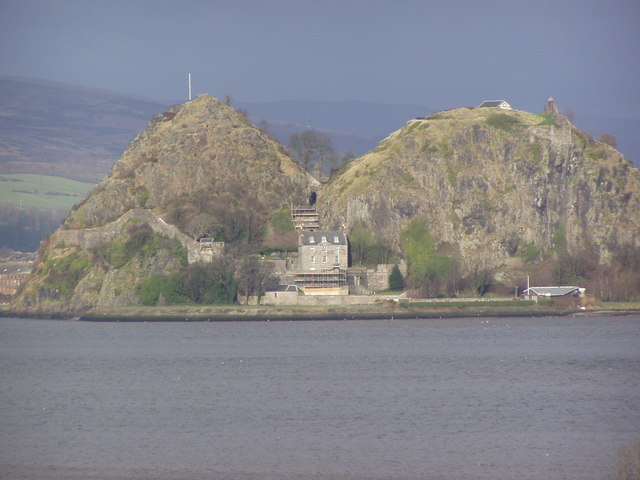
Events at Dumbarton Castle, pictured here, triggered David's rise to power at the end of 1398.

By April 1398, Robert III's rule of Scotland was facing severe criticism in many parts of the kingdom. The king, who suffered from periodic bouts of illness, was accused of failing to maintain order in northern Scotland. At the time of his creation as Duke of Rothesay that same month, David was tasked by the general council with leading an army into the Highlands to confront Donald, Lord of the Isles, who had recently raided in Moray. David's uncle, Robert, who had been created Duke of Albany on the same day as David's own elevation to ducal status, was appointed as joint leader of the expedition against Donald. The royal campaign in the north was derailed when Walter Danielston, a brother of the former castellan of Dumbarton Castle, seized control of the castle against Robert III's wishes. Although he laid siege to Dumbarton with a large army in late 1398, Robert III was unable to remove Danielston from the castle. David joined his father at the siege of Dumbarton, where he was given the earldom of Atholl in September 1398, possibly as a reward for his efforts to pacify northern Scotland. Robert III's failure to recapture Dumbarton was the final blow to his prestige and political authority. David attended a gathering of noblemen at Falkland Palace, the residence of his uncle Robert, Duke of Albany, in November 1398, where the two men likely decided to remove the king from power.

At a general council held at Perth in January 1399, Robert III was forced to surrender power to David as regent of the kingdom. The king's subjects were ordered to obey and support David "as they should do with the king's person". He was officially styled as "lieutenant" for his father. David's assumption of power was supported by Archibald, 3rd Earl of Douglas, in the prelude to David's marriage to the earl's daughter the following year. David was also supported by his mother Annabella, who had arranged for him to be knighted at a tournament in Edinburgh. At the beginning of his regency, David cooperated with his uncle, the Duke of Albany, in the governance of Scotland. The parliamentary statutes that had allowed David to assume power also required him to take advice from a council of twenty-one noblemen and prelates, including Robert, Duke of Albany, and Walter Stewart of Brechin, another of David's uncles. David's maternal uncle, Malcolm Drummond, reconciled with the Duke of Albany in 1399, likely as part of a general rapprochement between the affinities of David and Robert.

David convened a parliament at Scone in February 1401, where he was responsible for new statutes of criminal and property law. One of the decrees of this parliament was that widows and orphans should have greater access to David and other royal officials, a measure intended to allow poor petitioners to complain to the king's council more easily. David also issued statutes on hunting and the burning of moorland.

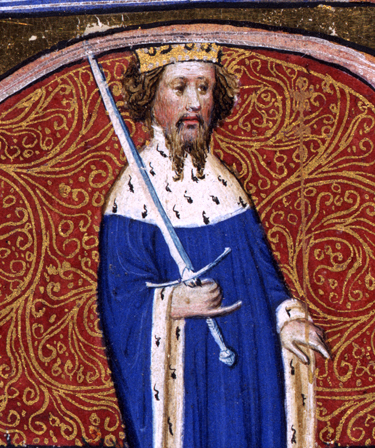
Henry IV of England, who challenged David by invading Scotland in 1400.

==== War with England ====
After the deposition of Richard II of England in 1399, David seems to have authorized Scottish raids into northern England. Shortly before the coronation of the new English king, Henry IV, on 13 October 1399, a Scottish army destroyed Wark Castle in Northumberland.

George, Earl of March, appealed to Henry IV for support in the spring of 1400, after David had repudiated the earl's daughter, Elizabeth, to marry Mary Douglas. Henry responded to these appeals by invading Scotland in August 1400, raising an army of 20,000 men for the purpose. The English army advanced to Leith, where Henry demanded the feudal homage of Robert III and the Scottish nobility. Upon hearing of Henry's approach, David retreated to Edinburgh Castle, where he barricaded himself alongside his brother-in-law, Archibald, Master of Douglas, and other noblemen. David responded to Henry's demands for homage in a defiant letter, in which he refused to accord Henry the title of King of England, and offered a staged battle between members of the English and Scottish nobility as a means to end the war. According to the contemporary author Walter Bower, David clashed with his uncle, Robert, Duke of Albany, over the conduct of the war, with the duke refusing to bring his army to David's aid at Edinburgh. Henry was unable to defeat the Scots in a pitched battle and, lacking the supplies to besiege Edinburgh Castle, withdrew to England in September.

In March 1401, David and his uncle, the Duke of Albany, attempted to open negotiations with Henry IV for peace, but were prevented from doing so by David's brother-in-law Archibald, who had now become Earl of Douglas. Archibald physically prevented David from entering the West March. Around this time, Henry Percy led an English army to raid in East Lothian, but was defeated by Archibald. David arranged negotiations with English representatives at Kirk Yetholm in October 1401, but probably fell from power before they could take place.

=== Downfall ===
David's mother, Annabella, Queen of Scots, died in the "harvest time" of 1401, probably in October. According to Walter Bower, the queen's death led directly to the end of David's working relationship with his uncle, Robert, Duke of Albany. David's conflict with his uncle was likely caused by the aggressive fiscal policy which he began to pursue in the latter half of 1401. After the death of Walter Trail, Bishop of St. Andrews, during the summer of that year, David attempted to occupy St. Andrews Castle until a new bishop could be elected. David ordered the construction of siege engines to capture the castle. David's interest in St. Andrews was likely driven by its status as the wealthiest Scottish diocese. David's uncle, the Duke of Albany, probably opposed his actions in St. Andrews. The duke supported the right of his illegitimate half-brother, Thomas Stewart, to claim the revenues of St. Andrews as bishop, in opposition to David. David's uncle was probably also angered by the prince's interference in his earldom of Fife, which included most of the diocesan lands of St. Andrews.

David personally visited a number of prominent burghs, including Aberdeen, Dundee, and Montrose, during the summer of 1401, in order to acquire money from their financial officials. David was accused of violently forcing officials in Dundee to give him £70, while in Montrose he abducted John Tyndale, a customs official, until Tyndale handed over £24. At this time, David may also have attempted to claim his mother's annual pension of 2,500 merks. David's fiscal policies likely angered his uncle, Robert, Duke of Albany, whose authority as Chamberlain of Scotland had been bypassed by the prince's actions. The duke, who likely felt threatened by David's assertiveness, began arranging an attack against his nephew in late 1401. David also came into conflict with his brother-in-law, Archibald, 4th Earl of Douglas, by claiming the title of Earl of March, which had been forfeited by George Dunbar after the English invasion, probably in mid-1401. David's possession of March prevented Archibald from obtaining his desired lands in the earldom. David likely opposed Archibald's desire to dismantle the earldom because it would prevent Dunbar, who had fled to England, from regaining his former lands as part of a potential peace treaty with Henry IV.

Probably towards the end of 1401, David was betrayed and arrested on the road near Strathtyrum by his retainers, John Ramornie and William Lindsay of Rossie. David's former ally, David, Earl of Crawford, may also have taken part in his arrest. Robert, Duke of Albany, who had arranged for David's arrest, ordered the prince to be imprisoned in St. Andrews Castle, where David's siege had now been abandoned. The Duke of Albany negotiated with Archibald, Earl of Douglas, at Culross to secure his support for David's imprisonment, probably a few days after David's arrest. The duke, who feared resistance from David's remaining allies, ordered the arrest of David's uncle, Malcolm Drummond, around the same time. Drummond later died in the duke's custody.

== Death ==
David was transferred from St. Andrews to Falkland Palace shortly after the meeting at Culross. His brother-in-law, Archibald, Earl of Douglas, may have escorted him to prison at Falkland. According to Walter Bower, David was forced to ride from St. Andrews to Falkland on a mule, wearing russet robes. This was likely a deliberate measure of humiliation, recalling the treatment of Richard II of England after his deposition several years earlier. The decision to kill David may already have been made between his uncle and brother-in-law at Culross. Robert, Duke of Albany, having initially ordered David's arrest, likely reasoned that it was now too dangerous to allow David to succeed his infirm father, Robert III, as King of Scots. If David became king, the duke would likely have faced accusations of treason for his continued detention.

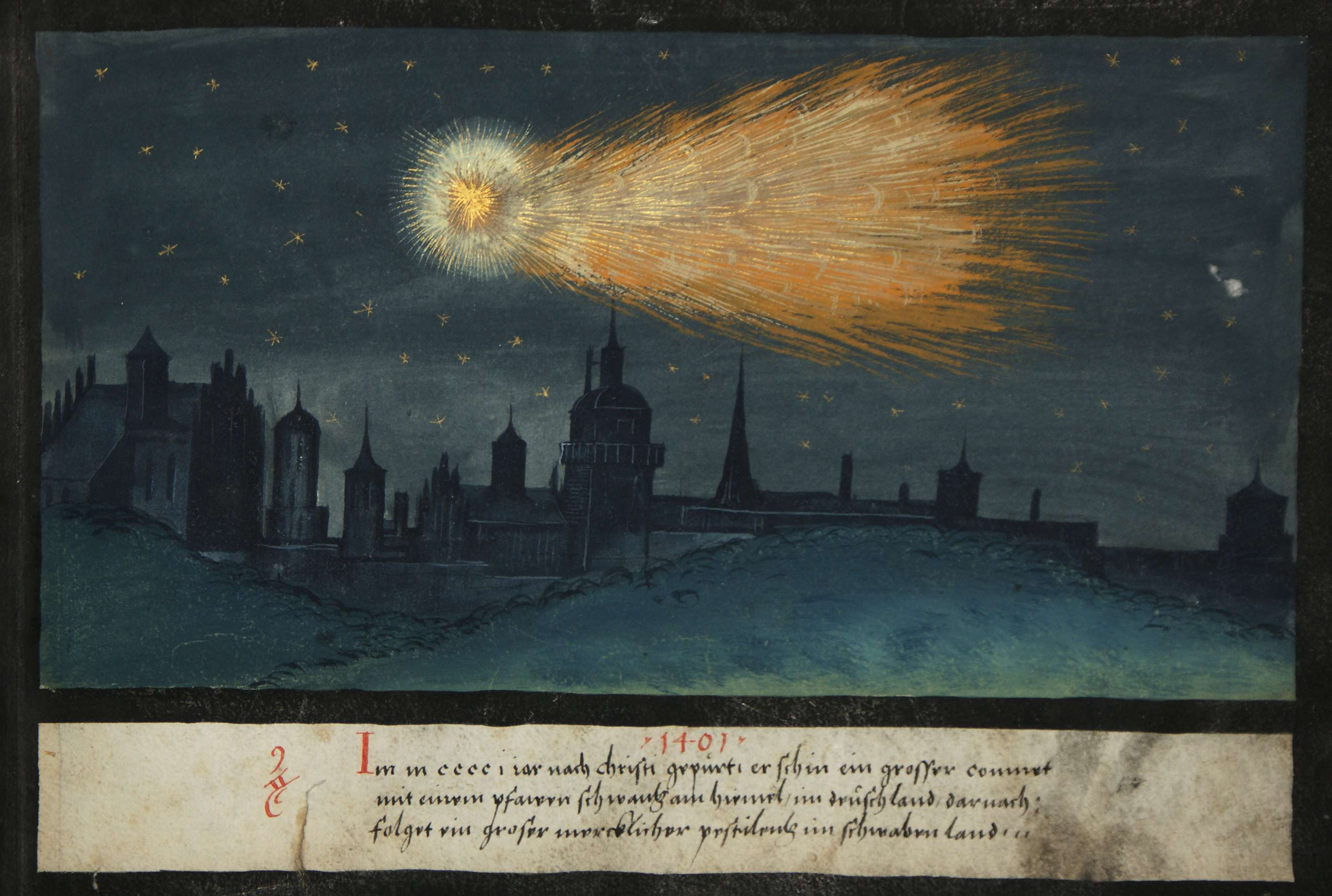
The appearance of the Great Comet of 1402 was interpreted as symbolizing David's death.

David died at Falkland Palace, while in his uncle's custody, on either 25 or 27 March 1402. Contemporaries generally believed that David was starved to death on his uncle's orders, although Walter Bower asserted that he died of dysentery. According to one chronicle, the starving David had eaten his own hands. Bower claimed that the appearance of the Great Comet of 1402 in Scotland was taken as a sign of David's death. David was buried at Lindores Abbey.

The circumstances of David's death were debated at a general council held at Edinburgh in May 1402, where Robert, Duke of Albany, and Archibald, Earl of Douglas, were exonerated of blame. Robert III was forced to decree that David had died "by divine providence and not otherwise." In 1405, Robert III made a grant to Deer Abbey for masses to be said in David's memory. According to Hector Boece, pilgrims sought miraculous healing at David's tomb at Lindores for many years after his death. David's younger brother, James I, who succeeded their father as King of Scots in 1406, took revenge on David's captors after returning to Scotland in 1424. James executed his cousin, Murdoch, Duke of Albany, the eldest son of Robert, Duke of Albany, and two of Murdoch's own sons. John Shirley, the contemporary English author, believed that James ordered Murdoch's death "because of the false murder of his brother, the Duke of Rothesay". James also imprisoned John Ramornie and William Lindsay of Rossie, the men who had arrested David in 1401, and deprived them of their lands.

== Fictional portrayals ==
David was the subject of an anonymous, full-length 18th century verse drama, The Duke of Rothesay, a tragedy, published and sold in Edinburgh in 1780. The story of his imprisonment is the principal subject of Walter Scott's The Fair Maid of Perth (1828) in which he is likewise portrayed as tragic victim. He also features as a principal character in relevant novels from Nigel Tranter's trilogy about the early Stewart kings, The Stewart Trilogy (1976-1977).

Peerage of Scotland
New title	Duke of Rothesay; 1398-1402	Vacant Title next held by James (I)
