= David Fleming of Biggar =

Scottish nobleman

David Fleming
- Arms of Fleming of Biggar: Quarterly, 1st and 4th: Gules, a chevron within a double tressure, flory and counter-flory argent (Fleming}; 2nd and 3rd: Azure, three cinquefoils argent (Fraser).
- Died: 14 February 1406
- Noble family: Fleming family
- Spouses: Jean Barclay; Isabel Strathechin
- Father: Malcolm Fleming

David Fleming (died 14 February 1406), Lord of Biggar, Lenzie and Cumbernauld was a Scottish nobleman.

== Life ==
David was the eldest son of Malcolm Fleming of Biggar. King Robert III of Scotland granted the lands of Cambusbarron and Blairegis in Stirlingshire, the chapels of Kirkintilloch and the lands of Drumtablay, with the mill thereof, in Dumbartonshire, the lands of Woodland and Meiklegall in the barony of Monycabock in Aberdeenshire and the lands of Cavers and office of sheriff of Roxburgh in 1399. He was entrusted by Robert II to convey Prince James of Scotland to Bass Rock for sailing for France in 1406, although the ship Maryenknyght was captured while en route to France, with Prince James and many Scottish nobles imprisoned by the English.

While returning from Bass Rock on 14 February 1406, he was ambushed by forces of Robert Stewart, Duke of Albany near Longherdmanston, six miles from Edinburgh and was killed in the skirmish.

== Family and issue ==
David married firstly Jean, the daughter of David Barclay of Brechin and Margaret Brechin. They are known to have had the following issue:

- Janet Fleming, married William Seton, 1st Lord Seton, had issue.
- Marion Fleming, married William Maule of Panmure, had issue.

He married secondly Isabel, heiress of Monycabock, the daughter of Donald Strathechin and Annabel. They are known to have had the following issue:

- Malcolm Fleming of Biggar, married Elizabeth Stewart, had issue.
- David Fleming, had issue.
