= Archibald Douglas, 4th Earl of Douglas =

14/15th-century Scottish nobleman and soldier

Archibald Douglas Earl of Douglas Duke of Touraine
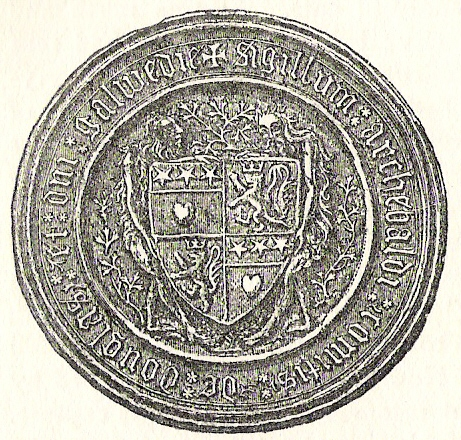
- Seal of the 4th Earl of Douglas
- Born: c. 1369
- Died: 17 August 1424; Verneuil, Normandy, France
- Cause of death: Slain at the Battle of Verneuil
- Resting place: Cathedral of St Gatien, Tours, France
- Title: Earl of Wigton; Lord of Galloway; Lord of Annandale; Lord of Bothwell; 13th Lord of Douglas
- Spouse: Margaret of Scotland
- Children: Archibald Douglas, 5th Earl of Douglas; Elizabeth Douglas; William Douglas; James Douglas; Marjory Douglas
- Parents: Archibald Douglas, 3rd Earl of Douglas (father); Joanna de Moravia, Lady of Bothwell (mother)
- Family: Clan Douglas

Archibald Douglas, 4th Earl of Douglas, Duke of Touraine (c. 1369 – 17 August 1424), was a Scottish nobleman and warlord. He is sometimes given the epithet "Tyneman" (Old Scots: Loser), but this may be a reference to his great-uncle Sir Archibald Douglas.

== Master of Douglas ==
The eldest legitimate son of Archibald Douglas, 3rd Earl of Douglas and Joanna de Moravia of Bothwell, he was born probably born at Bothwell Castle c. 1369 and was known as the Master of Douglas until his accession. By 1390 he had married the Princess Margaret of Carrick, a daughter of King Robert III of Scotland. Around this time, his father bestowed upon him the regalities of the Ettrick Forest, Lauderdale and Romannobridge, Peeblesshire.

On 4 June 1400, King Robert appointed him Keeper of Edinburgh Castle for life, on a pension of 200 merks a year.

== Rites of Passage ==
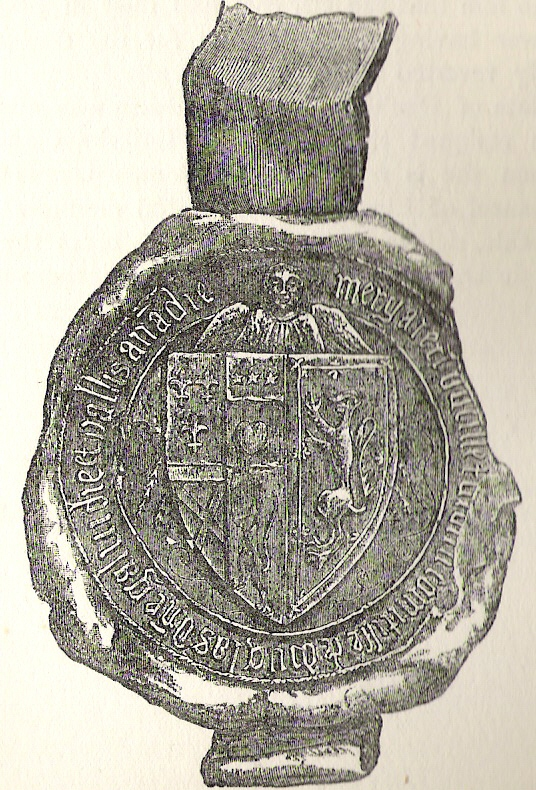
Seal of the Princess Margaret, Duchess of Touraine, Countess of Douglas. Daughter of Robert III of Scotland

=== Renewal of the Percy/Douglas feud ===
At Candlemas 1400 George I, Earl of March and Henry 'Hotspur' Percy had entered Scotland and laid waste as far as Papple in East Lothian. The villages of Traprain, Markle and Hailes were burnt and two unsuccessful attempts were made to invest Hailes Castle. The Master of Douglas, who held the office of Lord Warden of the Marches, surprised them by night at their camp near East Linton and defeated the English Force. The Douglases chased the enemy away as far as Berwick upon Tweed, slaughtering many stragglers in the woods near Cockburnspath.

=== Siege of Edinburgh ===
Later that summer Douglas was second in command to David Stewart, Duke of Rothesay, the lieutenant of the Kingdom, during the siege of Edinburgh Castle by Henry IV. Henry was unsuccessful in his endeavours and with Owain Glyndŵr's rebellion gathering apace in Wales, he became the last English monarch to ever invade Scotland in person.

=== Inheritance ===
Archibald, the 3rd Earl died at Christmas 1400, and the new 4th Earl became the largest and most powerful magnate in the realm. His father's vast lordships stretched from Galloway Douglasdale, Moray, Clydesdale to the shires of Stirling and Selkirk. These were augmented by the forfeited lands of the Earl of Dunbar in Lothian and the Merse.

=== Death of Rothesay ===
In 1402 Douglas' brother-in-law, the heir to the throne, David Stewart, Duke of Rothesay was held in close arrest, first at the Bishop's Palace at St Andrews, then at the Royal Palace of Falkland. At Falkland, Duke David died on 27 March, under mysterious circumstances. The Duke was 24 years old and in good health prior to his arrest, and rumours abounded that he had been starved to death in Falkland's pit prison by the Duke of Albany.

Prince David had been arrested under a warrant issued in the name of his father, the decrepit Robert III, by his uncle, Robert Stewart, Duke of Albany and Douglas. Both Albany and Douglas were rumoured to have been the authors of any foul play suspected. This can be shown by the fact that both men were summoned to appear before Parliament. However, on 16 March, both men were acquitted when Parliament passed an act stating that the Prince had: "departed this life through Divine Providence, and not otherwise", clearing both of High Treason, and any other crime, and strictly forbidding any of the King's subjects to make the slightest imputation on their fame. This can be considered a whitewash, as the Kingdom of Scots could not afford to lose its two most powerful men due to renewed English hostility. Douglas and Albany were considered to be the only fit antidote to the traitorous Earl of March and his English allies.

== Homildon Hill ==
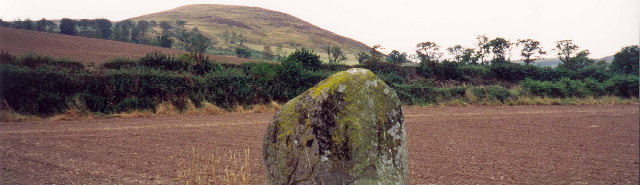
Site of the Battle of Homildon Hill

On 22 June the same year, a small Scots force was beaten by George Dunbar, the Earl of March's son, at the Battle of Nesbit Moor. Douglas led a punitive raid with Murdoch of Fife, Albany's son, as far as Newcastle to avenge the battle. At the head of 10,000 men he laid waste to the whole of Northumberland. March persuaded Henry Percy, 1st Earl of Northumberland, and his son Harry "Hotspur" Percy to lie in wait for the returning Scots at Wooler. Once Douglas' men had made camp at Millfield, relatively low ground, the English army rushed to attack. The Scots did, however, have keen sentries and the army was able to retreat to the higher ground of Homildon Hill and organise into traditional schiltron formations. Douglas had not learnt the lessons that had defeated his great-uncle at the Battle of Halidon Hill seventy years previously, and the schiltrons presented a large target for the English Longbowmen, and the formations started to break. A hundred men, under Sir John Swinton of the Swintons of that Ilk, chose to charge the enemy saying: "Better to die in the mellay than be shot down like deer". All perished. It has been suggested that Douglas hesitated to signal the advance of his main force, and when he did, it was too little too late. Douglas' mauled army met the as-yet unbloodied English men at arms and was routed. Many of Douglas' leading captains were captured, including his kinsman George Douglas, 1st Earl of Angus, Thomas Dunbar, 5th Earl of Moray and Murdoch of Fife. Douglas himself was captured, having been wounded five times, including the loss of an eye, despite the fact that allegedly Douglas' armour had taken three years in its construction.

=== Captivity ===
==== With the Lords of the North ====
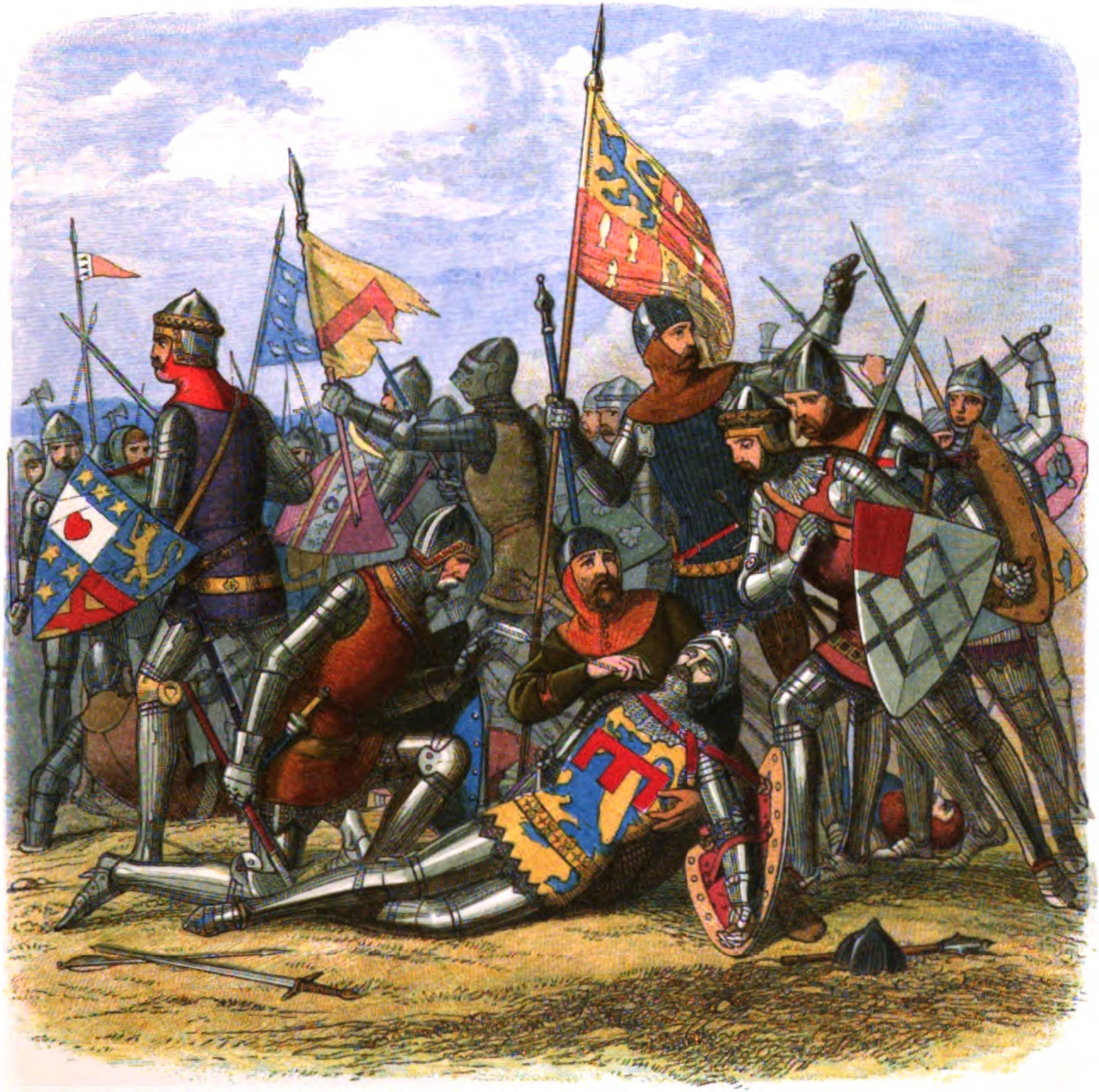
19th century depiction of Douglas on the left defending the mortally wounded Hotspur at Shrewsbury

If the Percys and the other English knights thought they had gained great immediate riches from ransoms, they were to be disappointed. They received a message from King Henry congratulating them on their victory but forbidding the release of any of their prisoners.

By 1403, Hotspur was in open rebellion against his King, joining with his kinsman Thomas Percy, Earl of Worcester, whilst Owain Glyndŵr was undertaking a campaign against English rule in Wales. Hotspur set free his Scots captives and Douglas with his co-prisoners decided to fight alongside their former captors. In the chivalric spirit of the time, Douglas marched with his former enemy Hotspur and his forces to the meet with King Henry IV at the Battle of Shrewsbury. Fighting on the English king's side was George de Dunbar, 10th Earl of March, then in exile from Scotland. The result of the battle was a decisive Royalist victory, Hotspur being killed by an arrow through the mouth. Douglas was once again captured, and suffered the loss of a testicle after having fought gallantly on the field and personally killing Edmund Stafford, 5th Earl of Stafford and Sir Walter Blount. Douglas had again tasted heavy defeat.

==== Prisoner of King Henry ====
Douglas was now a captive of King Henry. The cost of the ransom of the Scots nobles taken at Homildon was proving hard for the impoverished Scots exchequer. When Prince James of Scotland was captured en route to France by English pirates in 1406, the position seemed impossible. The aged King Robert III died of grief it is said soon after. The Kingdom of Scots was now in the hands of the Duke of Albany de facto.

== Return to Scotland ==
After giving his oath on Holy Scripture to King Henry to be his man above all others excepting King James, and on the production of suitable hostages for his parole, Douglas was allowed to return to his estates to carry out his private affairs. Douglas had agreed again under oath to return to captivity in England upon an appointed day. At Easter, Douglas went north and did not return upon the aforesaid day. King Henry wrote to Regent Albany complaining of this "un-knightly" behaviour and warned that unless Douglas returned the hostages would be dealt with at his pleasure. Douglas did not return. Only upon payment of 700 merks in 1413 to the new King of England, Henry V, were the hostages liberated.

=== Lord of Annandale ===
In a political volte-face, the Earl of March had been accepted back into the political fold in Scotland, both Douglas and Albany being reconciled to him. In 1409 March's lands in Lothian and the Merse were returned to him, on the condition of the Regent that his Lordship of Annandale be transferred to the Earl of Douglas. Combined with his Lordship of Galloway, Douglas now controlled the whole of southwest Scotland. The friendship between Douglas and Albany was confirmed in 1410 when they arranged the marriage of Douglas' daughter Elizabeth to John Stewart, Earl of Buchan, Albany's second son.

== Political Machinations ==
=== Embassy to the continent ===
Douglas went to Flanders and France in 1412, whereupon arriving in Paris he entered into negotiations with John the Fearless, Duke of Burgundy, whereby they agreed to a mutual defence and offence pact in their respective countries.

=== Warden of the Marches ===
Soon after his return to Scotland, Douglas resumed his duties as Lord Warden of the Marches, where he had free rein to defend it and keep the peace. However, it appears that Albany was not prepared to pay for this, so Douglas recovered his costs from customs fees on all trade goods entering the country.

=== The Foul Raid ===
In 1416, with King James still a hostage in England, Douglas twice visited London to enter negotiations for his release. Whilst there the Lollard faction, during Henry V's absence in France, tried to persuade the Scots delegation to go on the offensive. Albany decided that this would be an opportunity to reclaim Berwick upon Tweed and raised an army to take it. He despatched Douglas to Roxburgh Castle, which was also held by the English. When the Scots learnt of a huge army led by King Henry's brother, John of Lancaster, 1st Duke of Bedford and Thomas Beaufort, Duke of Exeter, they retreated ignominiously. The following devastation in Teviotdale and Liddesdale, and the burning of the towns of Selkirk, Jedburgh and Hawick earned this title of the "Foul Raid".

== The Great Army of Scotland ==
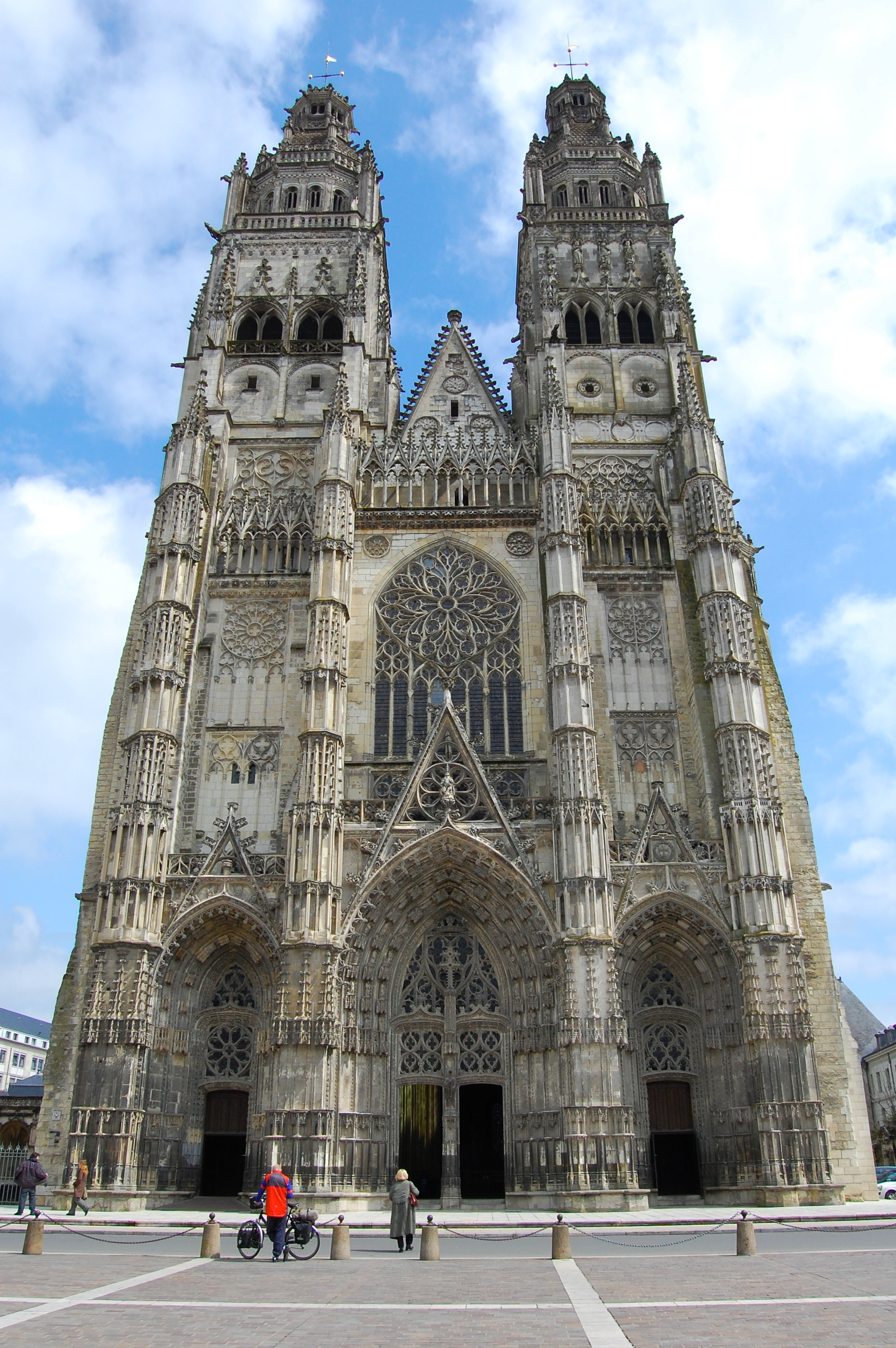
St Gatien Cathedral in Tours, resting place of the 4th Earl of Douglas

Douglas's son, the Earl of Wigtoun, had been fighting in France with his son-in-law Buchan, where they defeated the English at the Battle of Baugé in 1421. In 1423 Wigtoun and Buchan returned to Scotland to raise more troops for the war effort, and with a personal request to Douglas from Charles VII of France to lend his aid. Douglas's ally and Charles' implacable enemy, John the Fearless of Burgundy, had died in 1419, so Douglas willingly consented to the French king's request. After considerable gifts to the church, Douglas left the Earl of Wigtoun in Scotland to oversee his estates and the negotiations for the release of King James, while Douglas prepared for war. Douglas and Buchan then sailed to La Rochelle, arriving with an estimated 6,500 men on 7 March 1424.

=== Duke of Touraine and Lieutenant General of France ===
On 24 April Charles VII reviewed his new troops at Bourges. Douglas was given the post of "Lieutenant-General in the waging of war through all the Kingdom of France". On 29 April, Douglas was granted the Duchy of Touraine, including the "Castle, town and city" of Tours, and the "Castle and town" of Loches. Douglas was the first foreigner and also the first non-royal to be granted ducal status in France.

== Battle of Verneuil ==
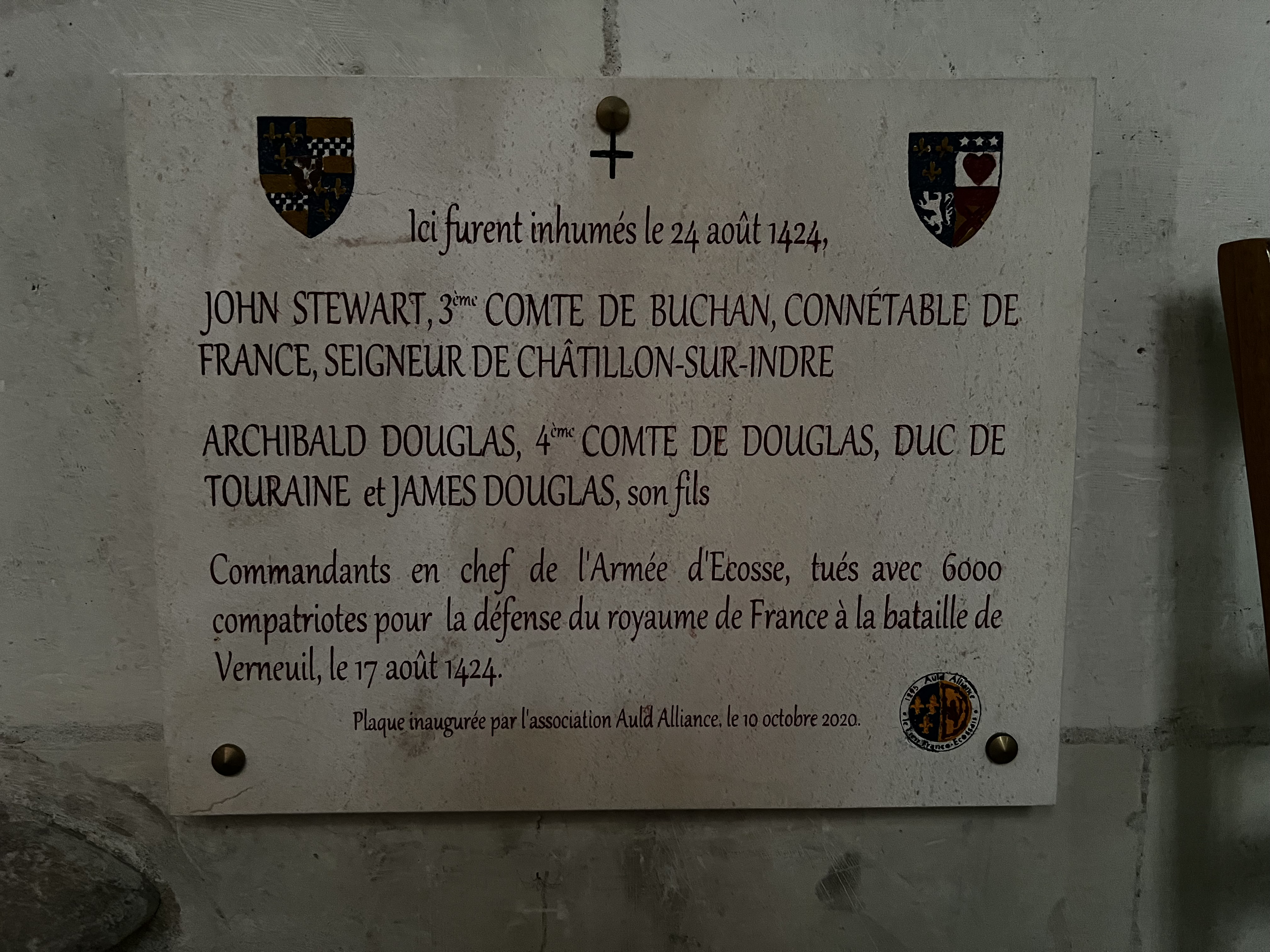
Memorial in St Gaiten Cathedral, Tours

The newly created French duke was defeated and killed at Verneuil on 17 August 1424, along with his second son, James, and son-in-law Buchan. Douglas was buried in the choir of Tours Cathedral, alongside Sir James Douglas, his son.

== Marriage and issue ==
In c. 1387 he married Margaret Stewart, eldest daughter of John Stewart, Earl of Carrick, who later became King Robert III. Of their children:

- Archibald Douglas, 5th Earl of Douglas, and Wigton, &c., (1390–1439), who succeeded to the earldom.
- Elizabeth (d. c. 1451), who married first John Stewart, Earl of Buchan, secondly Thomas, son of Alexander Stewart, Earl of Mar, and thirdly William Sinclair, 1st Earl of Caithness (d. 1480).
- William Douglas (b. before 1401)
- Sir James Douglas (d. 17 August 1424)
- Mary Douglas, who married Sir Simon Glendinning of Parton. Their daughter Janet married Gilbert Grierson 1st Lord of Lag.

== Douglas in Literature ==
The 4th Earl of Douglas is represented in William Shakespeare's Henry IV, Part 1 from the defeat at Homildon to his release following the Battle of Shrewsbury. Douglas also appears as a character in Edith Pargeter's 1972 novel A Bloody Field by Shrewsbury from his defeat and capture at Homildon through his participation at Shrewsbury on the rebels' side.

== Notes ==
Peerage of Scotland
Preceded by Archibald Douglas	Earl of Douglas; 1400–1424	Succeeded by Archibald Douglas
French nobility
Preceded by Charles VII of France	Duke of Touraine; 1423–1424	Succeeded by Archibald Douglas, de jure Louis III of Naples, de facto
