= Elizabeth Stewart (daughter of Robert III) =

Scottish princess

- Born: c. 1372
- Died: c. 1411 (aged c. 40)
- Spouse: James Douglas of Dalkeith
- Issue: James Douglas, 2nd Lord Dalkeith
- House: Stewart
- Father: Robert III of Scotland
- Mother: Annabella Drummond

Elizabeth Stewart (c. 1372 – c. 1411) was a Scottish princess. The second daughter of King Robert III and his wife, Annabella Drummond, she married James Douglas of Dalkeith, who was later created a Lord of Parliament as 1st Lord Dalkeith.

== Life ==
Little is known about Elizabeth's life. Her parents were married by April 1367, while Elizabeth herself had been born by 1373. Elizabeth was named as her father's younger daughter in 1378, in a charter confirming her betrothal to James Douglas of Dalkeith, a member of the Douglas of Mains branch of the Douglas family. Elizabeth's future father-in-law, James, Lord of Dalkeith, had been a prominent courtier during the later reign of David II, and remained powerful in Lothian. Elizabeth's marriage to the younger James Douglas was concluded around 1387, possibly at the same time as the marriage of her sister, Margaret, to Archibald Douglas. Her eldest child was born in 1390.

Elizabeth's husband was captured at the Battle of Homildon Hill in 1402, but had returned to Scotland by 1404. Elizabeth died before 1411.
