= Margaret Stewart, Duchess of Touraine =

Scottish princess (1370–1450)

Margaret Stewart
- Duchess of Touraine; Countess of Douglas; Lady of Galloway
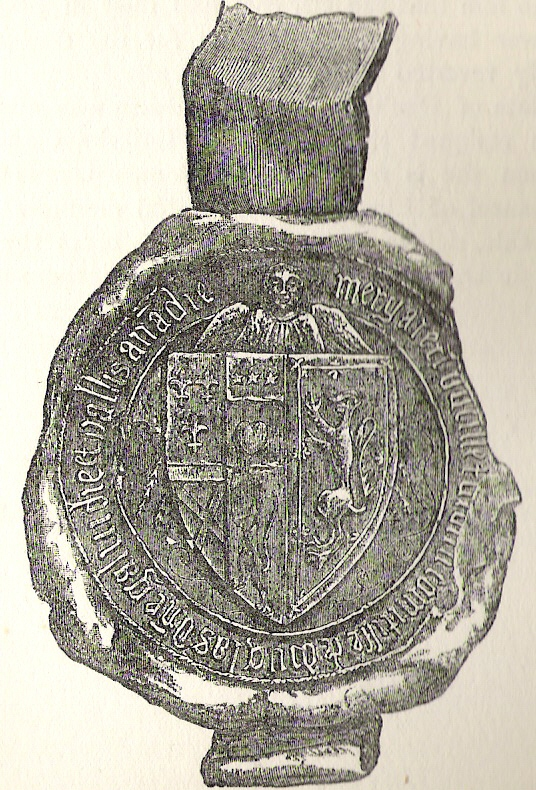
- The wax seal of Princess Margaret
- Born: c. 1370
- Died: c. 1450 (aged c. 80); Lincluden, Scotland
- Burial: Lincluden Abbey
- Spouse: Archibald, 4th Earl of Douglas
- Issue more...: Archibald, 5th Earl of Douglas
- House: Stewart
- Father: Robert III of Scotland
- Mother: Annabella Drummond

Margaret Stewart (c. 1370 - c. 1450) was a Scottish princess. The eldest daughter of King Robert III and his wife, Annabella Drummond, she married Archibald Douglas, 4th Earl of Douglas, becoming in his right Duchess of Touraine, Countess of Douglas, and Lady of Galloway.

== Life ==
Margaret was born on an unknown date between 1367 and 1373. Her parents were married by April 1367, while she had been born by the time of the entail of the Scottish succession passed by parliament in 1373. Margaret was named as her father's eldest daughter in a charter of 1378. Probably in 1387, but perhaps as late as 1390, Margaret married Archibald Douglas, the eldest son of Archibald the Grim. Margaret's father-in-law became Earl of Douglas in 1389.

Margaret's father, John Stewart, Earl of Carrick, succeeded her grandfather, Robert II, as King of Scots in 1390, taking the regnal name of Robert III after his accession. After Margaret's father-in-law died in 1400, her husband Archibald became Earl of Douglas and Lord of Galloway. There are few records of Margaret during the intervening decade. After his succession as Earl of Douglas, Margaret's husband embarked on a long martial career. He was defeated and captured by English forces at the Battle of Homildon Hill in 1402, not returning to Scotland until 1407. By that time, Margaret had suffered a series of family tragedies. Her younger brother, David, after a period as regent for their father, was arrested and starved to death on the orders of their uncle Robert, Duke of Albany, in 1402. In 1406, her father Robert III died shortly after the capture of her other surviving brother, James, by English pirates.

On 24 April 1424, Margaret's husband was elevated to the French title of Duke of Touraine by Charles VII of France, for his service as the leader of Scottish contingents in the Hundred Years' War. However, on 17 August of the same year, he was killed fighting in the Battle of Verneuil against an English army. Before his departure for France, the duke had delegated power in Galloway to Margaret. Meanwhile their eldest son, Archibald, who had been old enough to exercise authority alongside his father from 1419, inherited his father's Scottish titles, also becoming de jure Duke of Touraine. Margaret's official authority in Galloway was confirmed by her brother James I in 1426, when the king granted her the title of "lady of Galloway" for the remainder of her lifetime.

In 1426, Margaret made a grant to the Greyfriars of Dumfries in memory of her husband and her third son James, who had also fallen at Verneuil. Margaret's title to Galloway was the source of some friction with her eldest son, who supported the claim of William Douglas of Lesswalt, a prominent Gallovidian landowner, to the constableship of Lochnaw Castle over Margaret's preferred appointee, her squire Andrew Agnew. In a political compromise, Margaret in October 1426 secured Agnew's title to Lochnaw as a feudal vassal of Douglas of Lesswalt. Margaret attended her brother's court in 1429, probably alongside her younger sister, Mary, to demonstrate support for the claims of her nephew, John Kennedy, to lands in Carrick. In 1431, Margaret intervened with the king to secure her eldest son's release from detention, after the latter had clashed briefly with his uncle, James I, over the king's treatment of the Kennedy family.

In the wake of her brother's assassination in 1437, Margaret's eldest son was chosen by the Parliament of Scotland to become regent of the kingdom on behalf of her nephew, James II. After exercising authority for two years, the earl died of a fever at Restalrig in 1439. Margaret's grandson William became Earl of Douglas, but was killed alongside his brother the following year at the Black Dinner by his great-uncle, Margaret's brother-in-law James the Gross, who thus succeeded to the earldom. Margaret was then forced to acquiesce to the marriage of her only surviving grandchild, Margaret Douglas, to James the Gross' son William.

During Margaret's later years, her granddaughter was recognized as exercising authority in Galloway, allowing her husband William, who became Earl of Douglas in 1443, to use the style of Lord of Galloway jure uxoris. Margaret was forced to formally resign her title to Galloway in William's favour in 1447. By that time, she had retired to the priory of Lincluden and vacated her residence of Threave Castle, which was now occupied by her granddaughter's husband. In 1449, Margaret's name was included in William's petition to Charles VII of France, asking him to recognize William's usage of the style of Duke of Touraine. This petition was denied, although Margaret continued to style herself as duchess. Margaret died on an unknown date in 1450/51. She was still alive in January 1450, when her nephew James II confirmed her resignation of Galloway, but she had died by January 1451. Margaret's tomb survives today at Lincluden.
