= James Douglas, 1st Lord Dalkeith =

James Douglas, 1st Lord Dalkeith (after 1372 – before 22 May 1441) was a Scottish nobleman born in Dalkeith, Midlothian, Scotland to Sir James Douglas and Agnes Dunbar. James (the father) was the brother of Nicholas Douglas, 1st Lord of Mains.

Lord Dalkeith descended from Andrew Douglas of Hermiston (or Herdmanston) (d.b. 1277), who it has been argued, might have been younger son of Archibald I, Lord of Douglas (fl. c. 1198–1238), however there is no evidence other than Andrew's grants to Hermiston at a later date, that support this argument. Andrew was succeeded by his son William Douglas of Hermiston, a signatory of the Ragman Roll in 1296. William of Hermiston's son, James Douglas of Lothian succeeded his father and produced two sons, Sir William Douglas and Sir John Douglas. Sir William Douglas, known as the Knight of Liddesdale or the Flower of Chivalry obtained the privileges of the barony of Dalkeith, in Midlothian, in 1341, and the barony of Aberdour, in Fife, in 1342. Following William of Liddesdale's murder at the hands of his cousin William Douglas, 1st Earl of Douglas, both baronies passed to his nephew, James. James Douglas was confirmed in this position when his title was ratified by the Earl of Douglas prior to 1370. The lands of Dalkeith, and Aberdour, in Fife, were combined as a single barony in 1386, with the principal seat at Dalkeith Castle, and a secondary residence at Aberdour Castle.

He married Elizabeth Stewart, daughter of King Robert III, about the year 1387. They had five children before she died: William, James, Henry, Janet (who married John Hamilton of Cadzow) and Margaret.

He married, as his second wife, Janet Borthwick, daughter of Sir William Borthwick, with whom he had a son named William.

Peerage of Scotland
New creation	Lord Dalkeith; 1341–c. 1360s	Succeeded by James Douglas
