= List of heirs to the Scottish throne =

This is a list of the individuals who were, at any given time, considered the next in line to inherit the throne of Scotland, should the incumbent monarch die. Those who actually succeeded (at any future time) are shown in bold. Stillborn children and infants surviving less than a month are not included.

It may be noted that although the Crown could pass through the female line (for example to the House of Dunkeld in 1034), in the High Middle Ages it is doubtful whether a queen regnant would have been accepted as ruler.

Significant breaks in the succession, where the designated heir did not in fact succeed (due to usurpation, conquest, revolution, or lack of heirs) are shown as breaks in the table below.

== 1124 to 1290 ==
Heir	Status	Relationship to Monarch	Became heir	Reason	Ceased to be heir	Reason	Monarch
Henry, Earl of Huntingdon	Heir apparent	Son	23 April 1124	Father became king	12 June 1152	Died	David I
Malcolm	Heir apparent	Grandson	12 June 1152	Father died	24 May 1153	Became king	David I
William, Earl of Northumbria	Heir presumptive	Younger brother	24 May 1153	Brother became king	9 December 1165	Became king	Malcolm IV
David, Earl of Huntingdon	Heir presumptive	Younger brother	9 December 1165	Brother became king	1193	Daughter born to king	William I
Margaret	Heir presumptive	Eldest daughter	1193	Born	24 August 1198	Brother born	William I
Alexander	Heir apparent	Son	24 August 1198	Born	4 December 1214	Became king	William I
Margaret, Countess of Kent	Heir presumptive	Elder sister	4 December 1214	Brother became king	4 September 1241	Son born to king	Alexander II
Alexander	Heir apparent	Son	4 September 1241	Born	8 July 1249	Became king	Alexander II
Margaret, Countess of Kent	Heir presumptive	Aunt	8 July 1249	Nephew became king	25 November 1259	Died	Alexander III
Isabella, Countess of Norfolk	Heir presumptive	Aunt	25 November 1259	Sister died	28 February 1261	Daughter born to king	Alexander III
Margaret	Heir presumptive	Daughter	28 February 1261	Born	21 January 1264	Brother born	Alexander III
Alexander	Heir apparent	Eldest son	21 January 1264	Born	28 January 1284	Died	Alexander III
Margaret	Heir presumptive	Granddaughter	28 January 1284	Uncle died	19 March 1286	Became lady and queen	Alexander III
No recognised heir 1286–1290							Margaret

== 1292 to 1296 ==
Heir	Status	Relationship to Monarch	Became heir	Reason	Ceased to be heir	Reason	Monarch
Edward	Heir apparent	Eldest son	17 November 1292	Father became king	10 July 1296	Father abdicated	John

== 1306 to 1371 ==
Heir	Status	Relationship to Monarch	Became heir Reason	Ceased to be heir Reason	Monarch
No recognised heir 1306–1315					Robert I
Edward Bruce, Earl of Carrick	Heir presumptive	Brother	27 April 1315; Proclaimed heir	14 October 1318; Died	Robert I
No recognised heir Oct–Dec 1318					Robert I
Robert Stewart	Heir presumptive	Grandson	3 December 1318; Proclaimed heir	5 March 1324; Twin sons born to king	Robert I
David Bruce, Earl of Carrick	Heir apparent	Son	5 March 1324; Born	7 June 1329; Became king	Robert I
Robert Stewart, 7th High Steward of Scotland	Heir presumptive	Half-nephew	7 June 1329; Half-uncle became king	22 February 1371; Became king	David II

== 1371 to 1707 ==
Heir	Status	Relationship to Monarch	Became heir Reason	Ceased to be heir Reason	Next in succession Relation to heir	Monarch
No recognised heir Feb–Mar 1371						Robert II
John Stewart, Earl of Carrick	Heir apparent	Son	27 March 1371; Proclaimed heir	19 April 1390; Became king	None; 1371–1373	Robert II
John Stewart, Earl of Carrick	Heir apparent	Son	27 March 1371; Proclaimed heir	19 April 1390; Became king	Robert Stewart, Earl of Fife; 1373–1378, Brother	Robert II
John Stewart, Earl of Carrick	Heir apparent	Son	27 March 1371; Proclaimed heir	19 April 1390; Became king	David Stewart, Duke of Rothesay; 1378–1390, Son	Robert II
David Stewart, Duke of Rothesay	Heir apparent	Son	19 April 1390; Father became king	26 March 1402; Died in captivity	Robert Stewart, Earl of Fife; 1390–1394, Uncle	Robert III
David Stewart, Duke of Rothesay	Heir apparent	Son	19 April 1390; Father became king	26 March 1402; Died in captivity	James Stewart; 1394–1402, Brother	Robert III
James Stewart, Duke of Rothesay	Heir apparent	Son	26 March 1402; Brother died	4 April 1406; Became king	Robert Stewart, Duke of Albany; Uncle	Robert III
Robert Stewart, Duke of Albany	Heir presumptive	Uncle	4 April 1406; Nephew became king	3 September 1420; Died	Murdoch Stewart; Son	James I
Murdoch Stewart, Duke of Albany	Heir presumptive	First cousin	3 September 1420; Father died	25 May 1425; Executed, son executed on same day	Robert Stewart; 1420–1421, Son	James I
Murdoch Stewart, Duke of Albany	Heir presumptive	First cousin	3 September 1420; Father died	25 May 1425; Executed, son executed on same day	Walter Stewart; 1421–1425, Son	James I
Murdoch Stewart, Duke of Albany	Heir presumptive	First cousin	3 September 1420; Father died	25 May 1425; Executed, son executed on same day	Alexander Stewart; 1425, Son	James I
Walter Stewart, Earl of Atholl	Heir presumptive	Half-uncle	25 May 1425; Half-nephew executed	16 October 1430; Twin sons born to king	Alan Stewart, Earl of Caithness; Son	James I
Alexander Stewart, Duke of Rothesay	Heir apparent	Son	16 October 1430; Born	1430; Died	James Stewart; Brother	James I
James Stewart, Duke of Rothesay	Heir apparent	Son	1430; Brother died	21 February 1437; Father assassinated, became king	Walter Stewart, Earl of Atholl; Half-granduncle	James I
Walter Stewart, Earl of Atholl	Heir presumptive	Half-granduncle	21 February 1437; Half-grandnephew became king	26 March 1437; Executed, grandson executed on same day	Robert Stewart, Master of Atholl; Grandson	James II
No recognised heir 1437–1451						James II
James Stewart, Duke of Rothesay	Heir apparent	Son	10 July 1451; Born	3 August 1460; Became king	None; 1451–1454	James II
James Stewart, Duke of Rothesay	Heir apparent	Son	10 July 1451; Born	3 August 1460; Became king	Alexander Stewart, Duke of Albany; 1454–1460, Brother	James II
Alexander Stewart, Duke of Albany	Heir presumptive	Brother	3 August 1460; Brother became king	17 March 1473; Son born to king	John Stewart, Earl of Mar; Brother	James III
James Stewart, Duke of Rothesay	Heir apparent	Son	17 March 1473; Born	11 June 1488; Father killed in battle, became king	Alexander Stewart, Duke of Albany; 1473–1476, Uncle	James III
James Stewart, Duke of Rothesay	Heir apparent	Son	17 March 1473; Born	11 June 1488; Father killed in battle, became king	James Stewart, Duke of Ross; 1476–1488, Brother	James III
James Stewart, Duke of Ross	Heir presumptive	Brother	11 June 1488; Brother became king	January 1504; Died	John Stewart, Earl of Mar; 1488–1503, Brother	James IV
James Stewart, Duke of Ross	Heir presumptive	Brother	11 June 1488; Brother became king	January 1504; Died	John Stewart, Duke of Albany; 1503–1504, First cousin	James IV
John Stewart, Duke of Albany	Heir presumptive	First cousin	January 1504; First cousin died	21 February 1507; Son born to king	James Hamilton, 1st Earl of Arran; First cousin	James IV
James Stewart, Duke of Rothesay	Heir apparent	Son	21 February 1507; Born	27 February 1508; Died	John Stewart, Duke of Albany; First cousin once-removed	James IV
John Stewart, Duke of Albany	Heir presumptive	First cousin	27 February 1508; First cousin once-removed died	20 October 1509; Son born to king	James Hamilton, 1st Earl of Arran; First cousin	James IV
Arthur Stewart, Duke of Rothesay	Heir apparent	Son	20 October 1509; Born	14 July 1510; Died	John Stewart, Duke of Albany; First cousin once-removed	James IV
John Stewart, Duke of Albany	Heir presumptive	First cousin	14 July 1510; First cousin once-removed died	10 April 1512; Son born to king	James Hamilton, 1st Earl of Arran; First cousin	James IV
James Stewart, Duke of Rothesay	Heir apparent	Son	10 April 1512; Born	9 September 1513; Father killed in battle, became king	John Stewart, Duke of Albany; First cousin once-removed	James IV
John Stewart, Duke of Albany	Heir presumptive	First cousin once-removed	9 September 1513; First cousin once-removed became king	30 April 1514; Posthumous son born to James IV	James Hamilton, 1st Earl of Arran; First cousin	James V
Alexander Stewart, Duke of Ross	Heir presumptive	Brother	30 April 1514; Born posthumously	18 December 1515; Died	John Stewart, Duke of Albany; First cousin once-removed	James V
John Stewart, Duke of Albany	Heir presumptive	First cousin once-removed	18 December 1515; First cousin once-removed died	2 June 1536; Died	James Hamilton, 1st Earl of Arran; 1515–1529, First cousin	James V
John Stewart, Duke of Albany	Heir presumptive	First cousin once-removed	18 December 1515; First cousin once-removed died	2 June 1536; Died	James Hamilton, 2nd Earl of Arran; 1529–1536, First cousin once-removed	James V
James Hamilton, 2nd Earl of Arran	Heir presumptive	Second cousin	2 June 1536; First cousin once-removed died	22 May 1540; Son born to king	Helen Campbell, Countess of Argyll; 1536–1537, Sister	James V
James Hamilton, 2nd Earl of Arran	Heir presumptive	Second cousin	2 June 1536; First cousin once-removed died	22 May 1540; Son born to king	James Hamilton; 1537–1540, Son	James V
James Stewart, Duke of Rothesay	Heir apparent	Son	22 May 1540; Born	21 April 1541; Died	James Hamilton, 2nd Earl of Arran; 1540–1541, Second cousin once-removed	James V
James Stewart, Duke of Rothesay	Heir apparent	Son	22 May 1540; Born	21 April 1541; Died	Arthur Stewart, Duke of Albany; 1541, Brother	James V
James Stewart, Duke of Rothesay	Heir apparent	Son	22 May 1540; Born	21 April 1541; Died	James Hamilton, 2nd Earl of Arran; 1541, Second cousin once-removed	James V
James Hamilton, 2nd Earl of Arran	Heir presumptive	Second cousin	21 April 1541; Second cousin once-removed died	8 December 1542; Daughter born to king	James Hamilton; Son	James V
Mary Stewart	Heir presumptive	Daughter	8 December 1542; Born	14 December 1542; Became queen	James Hamilton, 2nd Earl of Arran; Second cousin once-removed	James V
James Hamilton, 2nd Earl of Arran	Heir presumptive	Second cousin once-removed	14 December 1542; Second cousin once-removed became queen	19 June 1566; Son born to queen	James Hamilton, 3rd Earl of Arran; Son	Mary I
James Stuart, Duke of Rothesay	Heir apparent	Son	19 June 1566; Born	24 July 1567; Mother abdicated, became king	James Hamilton, 2nd Earl of Arran; Second cousin twice-removed	Mary I
James Hamilton, 2nd Earl of Arran	Heir presumptive	Second cousin twice-removed	24 July 1567; Second cousin twice-removed became king	22 January 1575; Died	James Hamilton, 3rd Earl of Arran; Son	James VI
James Hamilton, 3rd Earl of Arran	Heir presumptive	Third cousin once-removed	22 January 1575; Father died	19 February 1594; Son born to king	John Hamilton; Brother	James VI
Henry Frederick Stuart, Duke of Rothesay	Heir apparent	Son	19 February 1594; Born	6 November 1612; Died	James Hamilton, 3rd Earl of Arran; 1594–1596, Third cousin twice-removed	James VI
Henry Frederick Stuart, Duke of Rothesay	Heir apparent	Son	19 February 1594; Born	6 November 1612; Died	Elizabeth Stuart; 1596–1600, Sister	James VI
Henry Frederick Stuart, Duke of Rothesay	Heir apparent	Son	19 February 1594; Born	6 November 1612; Died	Charles Stuart, Duke of Albany; 1600–1612, Brother	James VI
Charles Stuart, Duke of Rothesay	Heir apparent	Son	6 November 1612; Brother died	27 March 1625; Became king	Elizabeth, Electress Palatine; Sister	James VI
Elizabeth, Electress Palatine	Heir presumptive	Sister	27 March 1625; Brother became king	13 May 1629; Son born to king	Electoral Prince Frederick Henry of the Palatinate; 1625–1629, Son	Charles I
Elizabeth, Electress Palatine	Heir presumptive	Sister	27 March 1625; Brother became king	13 May 1629; Son born to king	Electoral Prince Charles Louis of the Palatinate; 1629, Son	Charles I
Charles James Stuart, Duke of Rothesay	Heir apparent	Son	13 May 1629; Born	13 May 1629; Died	Elizabeth, Electress Palatine; Aunt	Charles I
Elizabeth, Electress Palatine	Heir presumptive	Sister	13 May 1629; Nephew died	29 May 1630; Son born to king	Prince Charles Louis of the Palatinate; Son	Charles I
Charles Stuart, Duke of Rothesay	Heir apparent	Son	29 May 1630; Born	30 January 1649; Proclaimed king	Elizabeth, Electress Palatine; 1630–1631, Aunt	Charles I
Charles Stuart, Duke of Rothesay	Heir apparent	Son	29 May 1630; Born	30 January 1649; Proclaimed king	Mary Stuart; 1631–1633, Sister	Charles I
Charles Stuart, Duke of Rothesay	Heir apparent	Son	29 May 1630; Born	30 January 1649; Proclaimed king	James Stuart; 1633–1649, Brother	Charles I
James Stuart, Duke of Albany	Heir presumptive	Brother	30 January 1649; Brother proclaimed king	6 February 1685; Became king	Henry Stuart; 1649–1660, Brother	Charles II
James Stuart, Duke of Albany	Heir presumptive	Brother	30 January 1649; Brother proclaimed king	6 February 1685; Became king	Mary, Princess Royal and Princess of Orange; 1660, Sister	Charles II
James Stuart, Duke of Albany	Heir presumptive	Brother	30 January 1649; Brother proclaimed king	6 February 1685; Became king	Charles Stuart; 1660–1661, Son	Charles II
James Stuart, Duke of Albany	Heir presumptive	Brother	30 January 1649; Brother proclaimed king	6 February 1685; Became king	William III, Prince of Orange; 1661–1662, Nephew	Charles II
James Stuart, Duke of Albany	Heir presumptive	Brother	30 January 1649; Brother proclaimed king	6 February 1685; Became king	Mary Stuart; 1662–1663, Daughter	Charles II
James Stuart, Duke of Albany	Heir presumptive	Brother	30 January 1649; Brother proclaimed king	6 February 1685; Became king	James Stuart; 1663–1667, Son	Charles II
James Stuart, Duke of Albany	Heir presumptive	Brother	30 January 1649; Brother proclaimed king	6 February 1685; Became king	Mary Stuart; 1667, Daughter	Charles II
James Stuart, Duke of Albany	Heir presumptive	Brother	30 January 1649; Brother proclaimed king	6 February 1685; Became king	Edgar Stuart; 1667–1671, Son	Charles II
James Stuart, Duke of Albany	Heir presumptive	Brother	30 January 1649; Brother proclaimed king	6 February 1685; Became king	Mary, Princess of Orange; 1671–1677, Daughter	Charles II
James Stuart, Duke of Albany	Heir presumptive	Brother	30 January 1649; Brother proclaimed king	6 February 1685; Became king	Charles Stuart; 1677, Son	Charles II
James Stuart, Duke of Albany	Heir presumptive	Brother	30 January 1649; Brother proclaimed king	6 February 1685; Became king	Mary, Princess of Orange; 1677–1685, Daughter	Charles II
Mary, Princess of Orange	Heir presumptive	Daughter	6 February 1685; Father became king	10 June 1688; Son born to king	Princess Anne of Denmark; Sister	James VII
James Stuart, Duke of Rothesay	Heir apparent	Son	10 June 1688; Born	11 May 1689; Father deposed, excluded from succeeding	Mary, Princess of Orange; Sister	James VII
Princess Anne of Denmark	Heiress presumptive	Sister (in-law / First cousin)	11 May 1689; Sister and brother-in-law became joint monarchs	8 March 1702; Became queen	None; May-Jul 1689	William II & Mary II
Princess Anne of Denmark	Heiress presumptive	Sister (in-law / First cousin)	11 May 1689; Sister and brother-in-law became joint monarchs	8 March 1702; Became queen	Prince William of Denmark; 1689–1700, Son	William II & Mary II
Princess Anne of Denmark	Heiress apparent	Sister-in-law / First cousin	11 May 1689; Sister and brother-in-law became joint monarchs	8 March 1702; Became queen	Prince William of Denmark; 1689–1700, Son	William II
Princess Anne of Denmark	Heiress apparent	Sister-in-law / First cousin	11 May 1689; Sister and brother-in-law became joint monarchs	8 March 1702; Became queen	None; 1700–1702	William II
No recognised heir 1702–1707						Anne

== See also ==
- Family tree of Scottish monarchs
- List of heirs to the British throne
- List of heirs to the English throne
