= Scottish burgh =

Scottish burghs were urban settlements enjoying trading privileges from medieval times until 1832. They regulated their own affairs to a varying extent according to the type of burgh concerned. The Scottish burghs were abolished in 1975. Burghs produced many types of historical records. Medieval burghs started to appear in the twelfth century. They provided an environment in which merchants and craftsmen could live and work outside the feudal system. However each burgh had to pay significant sums of money to the post holder of its original creator. This could be the crown, an abbot or a bishop, or also a secular baron.

== Royal Burgh ==
These were founded by, or subsequently granted, a royal charter. They were abolished in law in 1975, but the term is still used by many former royal burghs.

Most royal burghs were either created by the Crown, or upgraded from another status, such as burgh of barony. Many were ports and they shared a monopoly of foreign trade.

== Police burgh ==
The Burgh Police (Scotland) Act 1833 (3 & 4 Will. 4. c. 46) enabled existing royal burghs, burghs of regality, and burghs of barony to adopt powers of paving, lighting, cleansing, watching, supplying with water and improving their communities. The Burgh Police (Scotland) Act 1892 (55 & 56 Vict. c. 55) meant each burgh was now united as a single body corporate for police and municipal purposes. Any remaining burghs of barony or regality that had not adopted the police acts were implicitly dissolved.

They were abolished in 1975.
