= Merk (coin) =

Old Scottish silver coin

James VI: half merk or noble
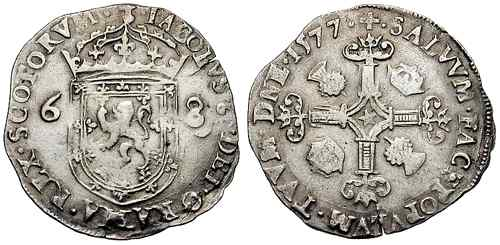
First side of the image: Crowned Scottish arms flanked by denomination: 6 [shillings] and 8 [pence]
Second side of the image: Compound cross fleury, quartered with crowns and thistles
1577 – Silver content 6.57 g (theoretical weight 103.8 grains, equivalent to 6.73 g). Grueber 135

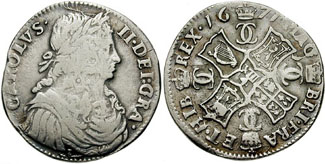
Merk of Charles II, 1671

The merk (Scottish Gaelic: marg) is a long-obsolete Scottish silver coin. Originally the same word as a money mark of silver, the merk was in circulation at the end of the 16th century and in the 17th century. It was originally valued at 13 shillings 4 pence (exactly 2/3 of a pound Scots, or about one shilling sterling), later raised to 14s. Scots.

== Varieties ==
In addition to the merks, coins issued include the four merk worth 56s. or £2/16/-; the half merk (or noble), worth 6/8 or 80 pence; the quarter merk, 3/4 or 40d.; the eighth-thistle merk, worth 1/8 or 20d.

== Issues and historical context ==
The first issue weighed 103.8 grains (6.73 g) and was 50% silver and 50% base metals, thus it contained 51.9 grains (0.108 troy ounces; 3.36 grams) of pure silver.

"Markland", or "Merkland", was used to describe an amount of land in Scottish deeds and legal papers. It was based upon a common valuation of the land.

During the "Lang Siege" of Edinburgh Castle in 1572, the last phase of the Marian civil war, the goldsmith James Cockie minted half merks in the castle, while the supporters of James VI set up their mint at Dalkeith.

The "Ten Merk Court" was a small-claims court in Edinburgh dealing with small debts up to the value of ten merks (i.e. £7), or for the recovery of servants' wages.

James VI issued silver merks with the lion of Scotland on the obverse and a thistle on the reverse. The last Scottish silver coinage of merks before the Union of Crowns of 1603, sometimes called the "eighth coinage" of James VI, were dated 1601, 1602, 1603, with some full thistle merks minted in 1604. James VI and I made the merk current in England on 8 April 1603, to be worth 13.5 English pence.
