= Lymphad =

Charge in Scottish heraldry

A lymphad or galley is a charge used primarily in Scottish heraldry. It is a single-masted ship propelled by oars. In addition to the mast and oars, the lymphad has three flags and a basket. The word comes from the Scottish Gaelic long fhada, meaning a long ship or birlinn. It usually indicates a title associated with islands, such as Lord of the Isles, specifically those on the west coast of Scotland, including the Hebrides – but is not limited to Scottish arms: prominent examples including the coats of arms of New Zealand and New Brunswick.

Although the drawing of the lymphad for heraldic design purposes naturally became standardized, there are minor differences. These usually involve the position of the sails and oars and the tincture of the flags. There are other variations as well, such as the tincture of the ship. Additionally, the basket may be afire and a crew may be depicted.

== Gallery ==
Hamilton arms quartered with the lymphad for the Earldom of Arran

Somerville-MacAlister of Loup and Kennox

Maclean of Duart and Morven

MacDonell of Glengarry

Duke of Argyll

New Zealand

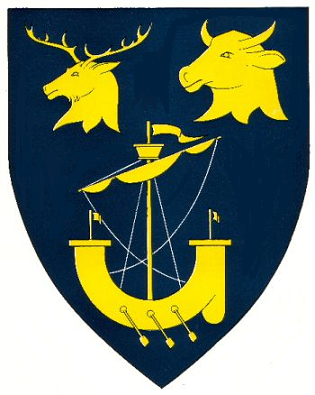
Inverness-shire

== Examples ==
The Captain of Clan Chattan field: Or, lymphad: Azure, sail furled, oars shown in saltire over the boat, flags Gules.

Lordship of the Isles field: Or, lymphad: Sable, sail furled, oars in action, flags Gules.

MacAlister of the Loup The lymphad is shown on an eagle's breast, Gules, lymphad Sable, sail furled, oars in action, flags Sable.

Macdonald, Lord of the Isles field: Or, lymphad Sable, sail furled, oars in action, flags Gules, with an eagle displayed on the boat.

MacDougall of MacDougall field: Or, lymphad Sable, sail furled, oars in action, flags Gules, with a fire basket fired on top of the mast.

McBain of Kinchyle field: Or, lymphad Azure, sails furled (Argent), oars in saltire, Gules, flags Gules.

Macfie of Colonsay field: Or, lymphad Sable, full sails Argent, no oars, flags Gules.

MacGillivray of Dunmaglass field: Azure, lymphad Or, sails furled, oars in action, flags Gules.

MacIain of Ardnamurchan field: Or, lymphad Sable, sails furled, oars in action, flags Gules.

Mackinnon of Mackinnon field: Or, lymphad Sable, sails furled, oars in saltire, flags Gules.

The Mackintosh field: Or, lymphad Azure, sails furled, oars in saltire (gules), flags Gules.

Maclachlan of Maclachlan field: Or, lymphad Sable, sail furled, no oars, flags Gules.

Maclaren of Maclaren field: Or, lymphad Sable, sail furled, oars in action, flags Sable.

Maclean of Duart field: Or, lymphad Sable, sails furled, oars in saltire, flags Gules.

MacNeil of Barra field: Or, lymphad Sable, sails furled, oars in action, flags Gules.

Cluny Macpherson field: per fesse (divided horizontally) Or and Azure, lymphad Or on the Azure, Azure on the Or (i.e.counterchanged), sails furled, oars in action, flags Gules.

The Captain of Clan Ranald field: Or, lymphad Sable, sail furled, oars in saltire, flags Gules.

Shaw of Rothiemurchus field: Or, lymphad Azure, sail furled, oars in saltire (azure), flags Gules. Despite the English surname, Shaw, the arms have a "Highland", Gaelic appearance.

Comhairle nan Eilean Siar
