= Clan Davidson =

Highland Scottish clan

- Daibhidh
- Crest: A stag’s head erased, proper – a stag on a silver field, one foot lifted, with an argent, silver arrow through the neck. The stag usually is natural colored with gold horns.
- Motto: "Sapienter si sincere", translated as "Wisely if sincerely"

Profile
- Plant badge: Boxwood or Red Whortleberry
- Pipe music: Failte Thighearna Thulaich ("Tulloch's Salute")

Chief
- Grant Guthrie Davidson of Davidston
- Chief of Clan Davidson
- Historic seat: Tulloch Castle
Septs of Clan Davidson
Davis, Davey, Davie, Davison, Dawson, Day, Dea, Deas, Dean, Deane, Deans, Dees, Dee, Deason, Desson, Dey, Dow, Kay, Key(s), MacDade, MacDaibhidh, MacDaid, McDavis, McDade, MacDavid, MacDevitt, Slora and Slorach
Allied clans
Chattan Confederation
Clan Mackintosh
Clan MacPhail
Clan MacBean
Clan Shaw of Tordarroch
Clan Farquharson
Clan MacThomas
Clan MacGillivray
Clan MacQueen
MacIntyres of Badenoch
the Macleans of Dochgarroch
Rival clans
Clan Cameron

Clan Davidson is a Highland Scottish clan and a member of the Chattan Confederation.

== History ==
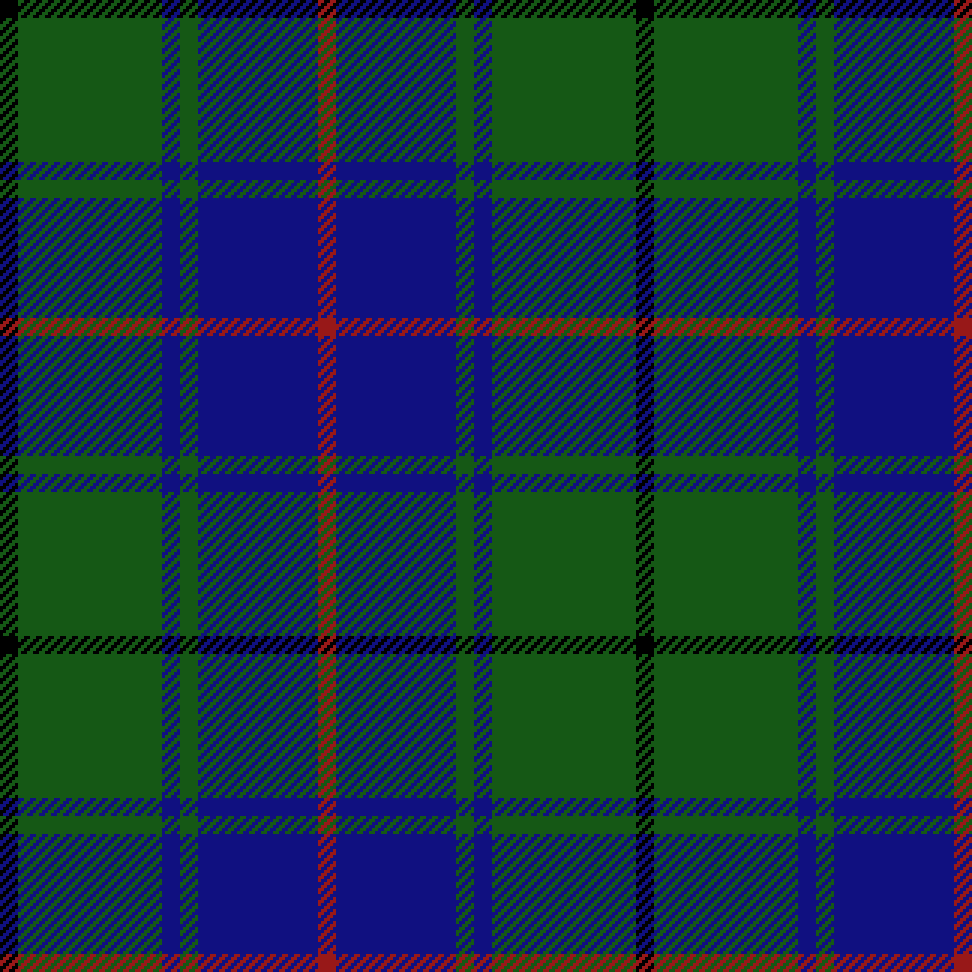
Davidson tartan

=== Origins ===
There are several versions of Clan Davidson's origins.

- According to William Skene, in his Celtic Scotland, Clan Davidson co-founded the Chattan Confederation with Clan MacPherson and are together referred to as Old Clan Chattan. Skene used sources that show the Davidsons to be descended from one of the sons of Gilliecattan Mhor, chief of Clan Chattan in the 11th to 12th century.
- According to Sir Aeneas Macpherson, John Burk, and William Anderson, the Davidsons are descended from the younger son of Muriach. Muriach (or Murdoch) was parson of Kingussie and became Captain of Clan Chatten on his brother's death. He obtained a dispensation from the Pope in 1173 and married a daughter of the Thane of Cawdor. From this union five sons were born, one of the youngest being David Dow (the black). Burk says he was the 5th son, Anderson the 4th. From here the Davidsons of Invernahavon are said to be descended.

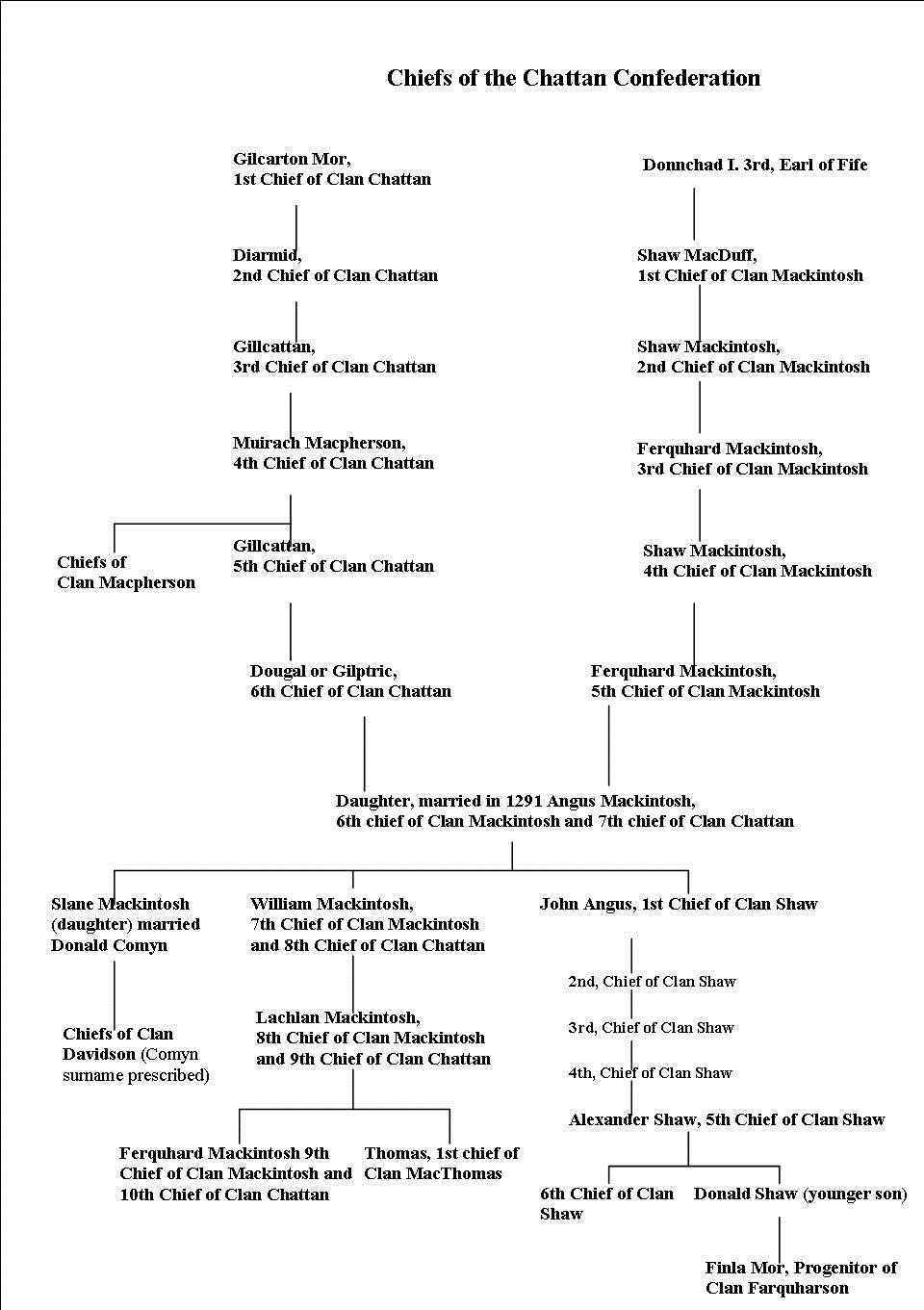
Tree showing the shared ancestry of the related chiefs of the Chattan Confederation. (click to enlarge).

- According to the Kinrara manuscript the Davidsons are descended from David Dubh of Clan Cumming. The first chief of Clan Davidson was David, who wed Slane Mackintosh, a daughter of the sixth chief of Clan Mackintosh, who was also chief of the Chattan Confederation. David's father was Donald, the third son of Robert Comyn who in turn was a grandson of John III Comyn, Lord of Badenoch, chief of the Clan Comyn. David and his followers became known as the Clan Dhai because the Comyn name had been proscribed in 1320, although Thomas Comyn or Cumming, son of Donald's elder brother was exempted from the prescription and gave rise to the Cummings of Altyre.

=== 14th to 15th centuries ===
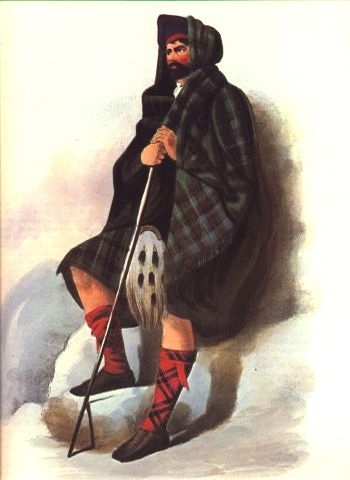
Davidson. A Victorian depiction of the clan painted by R. R. McIan.

The Clan Davidson or Clan Dhai are recorded as being wiped out as a fighting force in 1370 at the Battle of Invernahavon, which was fought between the Chattan Confederation and the Clan Cameron. There was a dispute between the Davidsons and another clan of the Chattan Confederation, the Clan Macpherson, over who would command the right wing in the battle. The Mackintoshes, chiefs of the confederation supported the Davidsons and as a result the Macphersons left the field. The Clan Cameron took advantage of this situation and the Davidsons were virtually destroyed. However the Macphersons did eventually join the battle and the Camerons were defeated.

In 1396 the Battle of the North Inch took place, in which most evidence suggests was fought between the Clan Cameron and Clan Chattan, the latter whose forces included both the Davidsons and Macphersons. Although Lowland accounts suggest that it was fought between the rival Davidson and Macpherson clans. After the battle of the North Inch the chief of Clan Davidson is said to have moved north from where the Davidson of Cantray and Tulloch families appeared.

In 1411, Robert Davidson, Provost of Aberdeen was killed leading the Burgesses of Guild of Aberdeen at the Battle of Harlaw against Donald of Islay, Lord of the Isles. There is a tradition that in the 15th century, the Davidson chief and some of his followers settled at a property called Davidston in the parish of Cromarty, Black Isle. Davidston was sold in the 18th century when the chief bought the estate of Tulloch in Ross-shire.

=== 16th, 17th and 18th centuries ===
By the 16th century the name Davidson could be found from Ayr in the south to Aberdeen in the north. The first Davidsons recorded in Cromarty were Donald Davidson and Alexander Davidson who were living in the new town of Cromarty and who are listed as "in the council" in July 1670. Another Alexander Davidson who was known as Clerk Davidson was the town clerk of Fortrose. He married Elizabeth Bremmer, second daughter of a burgess of Fortrose in November 1689. From Alexander descended the Davidson Lairds of Tulloch Castle who became chiefs of the clan.

In the 18th century members of the Clan Chattan Confederation, including many Davidsons, were convicted of Jacobitism and transported to the North American colonies.

=== American Revolutionary War ===
Many of these Jacobite convicts upon gaining their freedom settled in the Piedmont Mountains of North Carolina and raised families, leading the British by the time of the American Revolution to declare the area a Hornet's Nest of rebels.

Notable amongst the many Davidsons fighting the American Revolutionary War was Brigadier General William Lee Davidson (1746–1781), a North Carolina militia general during the American Revolutionary War who was killed in action at the battle of Cowan's Ford.

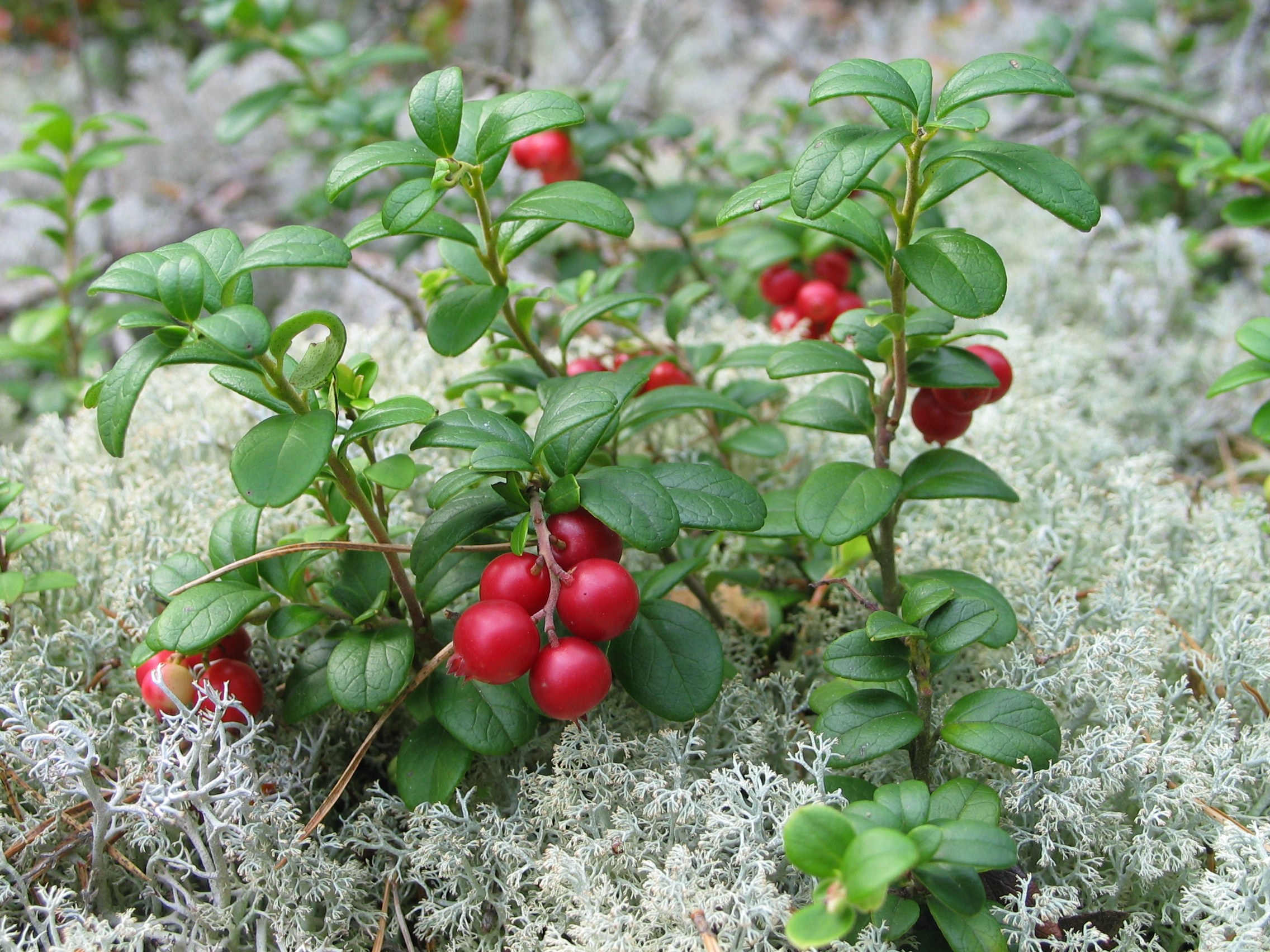
Red Whortleberry one of the plant badges of Clan Davidson. The other being Boxwood.

=== Clan seat and relics ===
Tulloch Castle became the seat of the chiefs of Clan Davidson in the 18th century and it was extensively restored by Robert Lorimer in 1922. The castle was later sold by the Davidsons but remains a focal point for Davidson traditions. A Davidson clan relic preserved by the local City Council is a suit of armour that is said to have been worn by Robert Davidson, Provost of Aberdeen who was killed at the Battle of Harlaw in 1411. The Clan Davidson Association was formed (as the Clan Dhai Association) in 1909 and is still very active.

=== Clan chiefs ===
- Duncan VI of Tulloch, Deceased 1917
- 1917–1997 vacant and disputed
- Duncan Davidson of Davidston, New Zealand, 1997–1997
- Alister Davidson of Davidston, New Zealand, 1998–2014
- Grant Guthrie Davidson 3rd of Davidston, New Zealand, 2015–

== See also ==
- Chattan Confederation
- Scottish clan
- Davidson (name)
- Day (surname)
