= Clan Shaw =

Highland Scottish clan

- Mac Ghille Sheathanaich
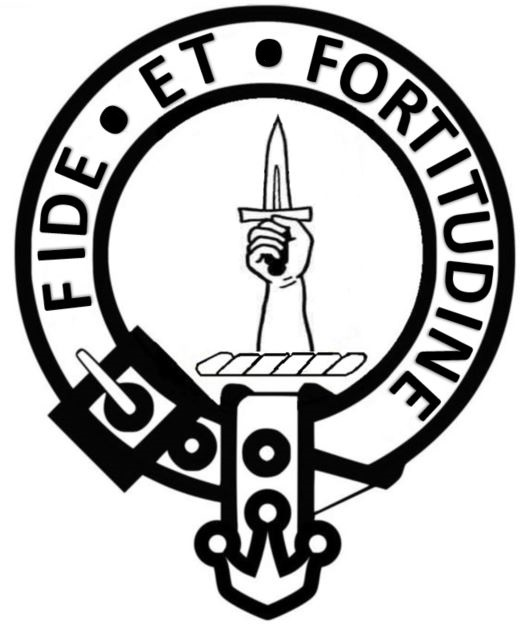
- Crest: A Dexter Arm, the hand holding the dagger, pale, proper
- Motto: Fide et fortitudine (By fidelity and fortitude)
- War cry: "Na Bean Ris A Chat" (Touch not the cat)

Profile
- Region: Highland
- District: Strathspey
- Plant badge: Red whortleberry
- Pipe music: The Rothiemurchus Rant, The Shaws March

Chief
- Landon Shaw of Tordarroch
- Historic seat: Doune of Rothiemurchus
Septs of Clan Shaw
Adamson, Adamsone, Ademson, Ademsoun, Ademsoune, Aesone, Aison, Aissone, Aissoun, Aissoune, Asson, Assone, Aue, Ave, Ay, Aye, Ayesone, Ayson, Aysone, Aysoun, Ayssoun, Eason, Easone, Easson, Esson, Ison, Isone, MacAy, Saythe, Scaith, Scayth, Schau, Schaw, Schawe, Scheoch, Scheok, Schiach, Schioch, Schioche, Seah, Seath, Seith, Seth, Sha, Shau, Shawe, Shay, Sheach, Sheath, Sheehan, Sheoch, Shiach, Siache, Sith, Sithach, Sithech, Sithig, Skaith, Sythach, Sythag, Sythock, Tordarroch
Allied clans
- Chattan Confederation
- Clan Mackintosh
- Clan MacPherson
- Clan MacBean
- Clan MacPhail
- Clan Farquharson
- Clan MacGillivray
- Clan Davidson
- Clan MacQueen
- MacIntyres of Badenoch
- Clan MacThomas
Rival clans
- Clan Comyn
- Clan Cameron

Clan Shaw is a Highland Scottish clan and is a member of the Chattan Confederation.

== History ==
=== Origins ===
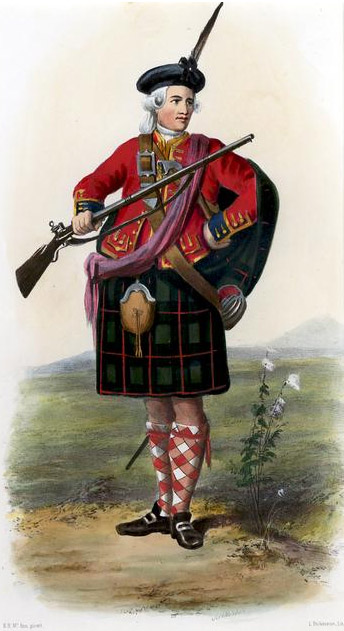
A Victorian era, romanticised depiction of Private Farquhar Shaw of the Blackwatch by R. R. McIan, from The Clans of the Scottish Highlands, published in 1845.

The progenitor of the Clan Shaw is believed to be one Shaw MacDuff who was a younger son of Duncan, the Thane or Earl of Fife, who was a descendant of Kenneth MacAlpin. Shaw MacDuff was made keeper of Inverness Castle, which was a strategic royal castle, by Malcolm IV of Scotland. His heirs were known as the Mhic anToiseach which means the sons of the Thane and they supported the royal government, consolidating their power around Inverness. Shaw's grandson was Shaw Macwilliam, who in 1263 acquired lands at Rothiemurchus. His son was Farquhard who due to problems with their powerful neighbours the Clan Comyn, made an alliance with the Clan Donald by marrying Mora, daughter of Aonghas Mór, Lord of Islay. Farquhard's son was Angus Mackintosh, sixth chief of Clan Mackintosh who married Eva, daughter of the chief of Clan Chattan (Chattan Confederation). Eva's second son John-Angus, was the first chief of Clan Shaw.

=== Wars of Scottish Independence ===
The feud with the Clan Comyn brought the Chattan Confederation support from Robert the Bruce and they fought for him at the Battle of Bannockburn in 1314. They also took part in the Scottish invasions of England in 1318 and 1319.

==== 14th century ====
The second chief of Clan Shaw was Shaw Macghillechrist Mhic Iain who was a great-grandson of Angus Mackintosh and Eva. He was known as Sgorfhiachlach(bucktooth) and was raised with his cousins at Moy, seat of the Mackintoshes. It seems certain that he was present at the Battle of Invernahavon against the Clan Cameron in 1370. In 1391 Shaw was elected as Captain of Clan Chattan for a raid on Angus under Alexander Stewart, Earl of Buchan who was known as the "Wolf of Badenoch". In 1396 Shaw was appointed to lead the Clan Chattan at the Battle of the North Inch, a trial by combat against the Clan Cameron, which took place in front of an audience that included Robert III of Scotland and the Dauphin of France.

=== 15th, 16th and 17th centuries ===
James Shaw of Rothiemurchas was killed at the Battle of Harlaw in 1411.

The grandson of Shaw Bucktooth was Aedh who settled at Tordarroch in 1468. He occupied a strategic site near the River Nairn and he and his followers became known as the "Clan Ay". On 22 May 1543 Angus MacRobert of Tordarroch was one of the signatories of a band of union and management of the Clan Chattan, that was signed at Inverness. Shaw of Tordarroch again signed a similar agreement on 4 April 1609. The clan prospered and Duncan Shaw, Laird of Crathienaird rose to become chamberlain to the Earl of Mar by 1691.

=== 18th century and Jacobite risings ===
On 15 September 1715 Mackintosh of Borlum called out the Clan Chattan to fight for the Jacobite cause in the Jacobite rising of 1715. The Shaw contingent was led by Robert, the younger of Tordarroch and his brother Angus. The Shaw contingent was noted for its discipline, equipment and bravery. Robert and Angus were both imprisoned after the rising had collapsed and Robert died soon after being released in 1718. Angus was transported to Virginia but was pardoned in 1722. Angus never recovered from his experience or the death of his brother and as a result he refused to call out his clan for the Jacobite rising of 1745. However many Shaws rallied to support the Jacobite Stuarts such as James Shaw of Crathienaird. Lady Anne Farquharson-MacKintosh called out the entire Clan Chattan to fight for the Jacobites and two of her most trusted lieutenants were James Shaw and John Shaw of Kinrara.

== Chiefs ==
=== The grave of Shaw Macghillechrist Mhic Iain ===
The 2nd chief of Clan Shaw has an unusual grave. Shaw Macghillechrist Mhic Iain known as Sgorfhiachlach was appointed to lead the Clan Chattan at the Battle of the North Inch, a trial by combat, as the Chief of Clan Macintosh was too old at that stage. His grave in Doune at Rothimurchus has 5 heavy homing stones resting on top, said to represent those who survived the battle. Any person who tampers with these stones is said to suffer illness or death. In 1983 an iron cage was placed over the grave to protect visitors from the curse. A spirit known as a Bordach an Duin is also said to guard the grave.

=== Current Chief ===
In 1970 Major Charles John Shaw of Tordarroch was recognized by the Lord Lyon King of Arms as chief of Clan Shaw. He was the grandfather of the present chief, in an unbroken line of continuity back to the ancient Earls of Fife.

== Clan Castles ==
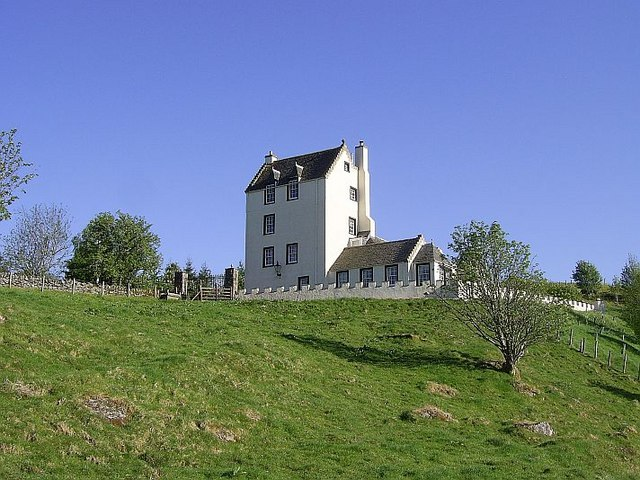
Tordarroch House

- Doune of Rothiemurchus, two miles south of Aviemore in Strathspey is an eighteenth-century mansion which replaced an earlier castle. The lands were held by the Shaws, Mackintoshes and by the Dallases of Cantray. James Shaw of Rothiemurchus was killed at the Battle of Harlaw in 1411.
- Tordarroch Castle, seven miles south of Inverness was once a strong tower but little survives. It was held by the Shaws from 1468. The castle was later replaced by Tordarroch House.
