= Robert Davidson, Provost of Aberdeen =

Scottish politician

Robert Davidson was the Provost of Aberdeen, Scotland, and the leader of Aberdeen City Council. He was killed leading a force from the city at the Battle of Harlaw on 24 July 1411 against Donald of Islay, Lord of the Isles.

== Background ==
Robert Davidson had been tried for piracy, including against Richard Whittington who was the Lord Mayor of London. However, Davidson also had legal privateer status which gave him authorisation from the government to carryout attacks. A court case raised against him by the Dutch Government was cancelled after he managed to get the French Government to intervene for him. He was also known to have been an innkeeper, wine importer and customs inspector. He became the Provost of Aberdeen and the leader of Aberdeen City Council.

It is possible that he was the son of either Laurence Davidson, who granted a charter in Aberdeen in 1360, or of William Davidson, son of David, who witnessed a charter in April 1350. In 1395, Robert Davidson is recorded, along with William Chalmers, as joint collector of King's or Great Customs at the port of Aberdeen, and he continued in this position until 1410. In 1398, he is recorded as a bailie and member of the council. This continued until Michaelmas in 1405 when he was elected as an Alderman. Historic references show that he occupied the civic chair of the council in 1406 and 1407. His position in the burgh was as a general merchant which included being a wine merchant. He often appeared in the burgh court.

He served as an agent collecting the pensions and annuities for several people of high rank, including: Sir Malcolm Drummond who was the first husband of Isabel Douglas, Countess of Mar, James Stewart the brother of Robert III of Scotland, and David Stewart, Duke of Rothesay. Davidson was clearly a friend of the Stewarts and in his position as Alderman, he appears on more than one occasion as a witness to the deeds of Alexander Stewart, Earl of Mar that were made at Kildrummy Castle. One of these occasions was in December, 1410, and the other guests included Gilbert de Greenlaw who was the Bishop of Aberdeen, Henry Leighton and Sir Alexander Irvine of Drum. This meeting may have been to discuss rumours of the future invasion by Donald of Islay, Lord of the Isles.

== Battle of Harlaw ==
In 1411, Donald of Islay, Lord of the Isles, was at feud with Robert Stewart, Duke of Albany, over the right to the earldom of Ross. This resulted in the Battle of Harlaw on 24 July 1411, which was fought just north of Inverurie. Davidson led a force of the Burgesses of Guild of Aberdeen in support of Albany's commander, Alexander Stewart, Earl of Mar. Davidson was the legal advisor to the Earl of Mar. Davidson was killed in the battle along with the burgesses. His body was interred in the Kirk of St Nicholas where a memorial service was held for him. According to Francis Douglas in his 1782 publication, A General Description of the East Coast of Scotland, after Davidson's death at the battle, Aberdeen Council passed an act forbidding the chief magistrate to go outside the city walls on future expeditions. This story was repeated by Walter Scott but there is no historical evidence to support it.

Munro relates a ballad regarding Robert Davidson at the Battle of Harlaw:

From Aberdeen five hundred warriors came, All clad in steel and not unknown to fame; There Provost Davidson led the chosen band, And brave Hugh Ross next him had the command. Both men of prowess and superior force; One led the foot and the other ruled the horse.

== Family ==
It is recorded that Davidson had one daughter, Margaret, but an entry in the Aberdeen burgess register in 1400 possibly shows that he had two sons, Henry and Thomas, who he was cautioner for.

== Relics ==
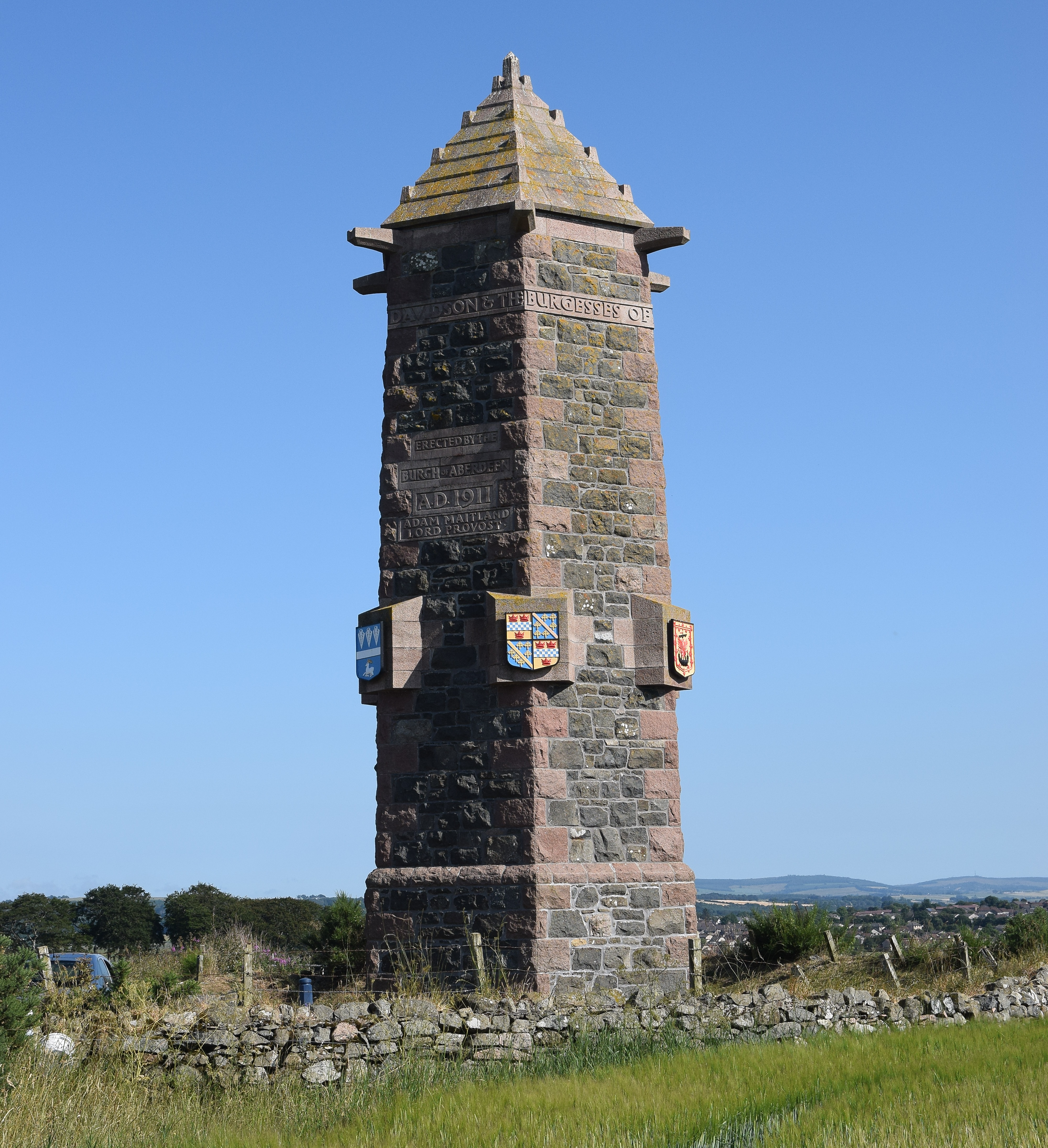
The Harlaw Monument which was erected in 1911 in memory of Provost Robert Davidson and the Burgesses of Aberdeen.

In the entrance hall of the council's Aberdeen Town House, there is on display a suit of armour that was allegedly worn by Robert Davidson at the Battle of Harlaw. His tomb can still be seen in the Kirk of St Nicholas. The National Library of Scotland holds a drawing of the effigy of Robert Davidson. In 1911, the Harlaw Monument was erected in memory of Provost Robert Davidson and the Burgesses of Aberdeen who were killed at the Battle of Harlaw in 1411.

== See also ==
- Clan Davidson

Civic offices
Preceded by William de Camera II	Lord Provost of Aberdeen; 1405–1409	Succeeded by John Fichet
Preceded by John Fichet	Lord Provost of Aberdeen; 1410–1411	Succeeded by Andrew Giffard
