= Burgesses of Guild of Aberdeen =

- Formation: 27 February 1214; 812 years ago
- Website: http://www.aberdeenburgesses.com

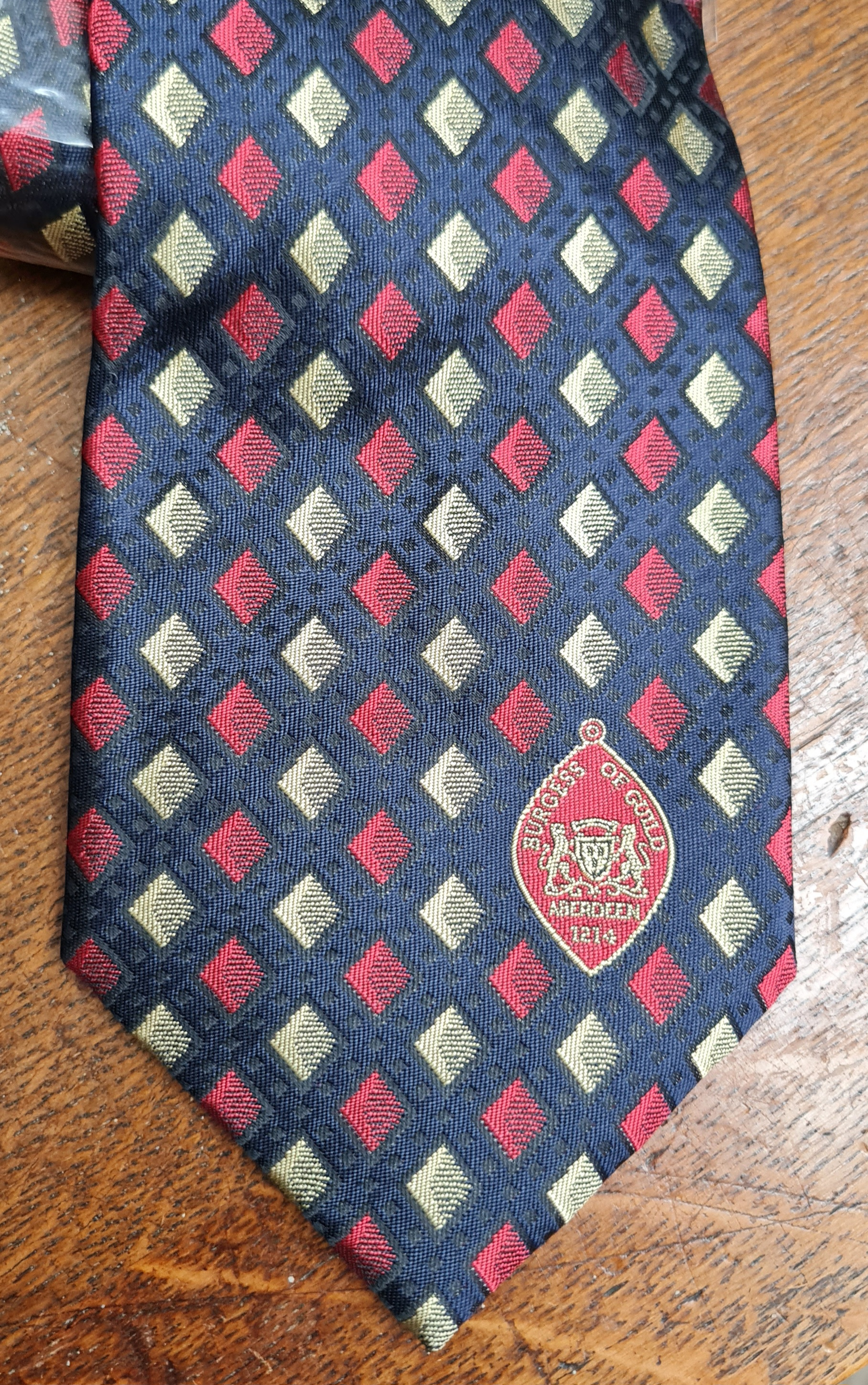
Burgess of Guid,, Aberdeen necktie

The Burgesses of Guild of the City of Aberdeen is an organisation which dates back over 800 years. Originally, with a membership composed of local merchants, it played a part in the town council for more than 700 years. With a changed role, diminished by legislation, it continues with a changed purpose and an active membership of over 1,100 members.

== Early history ==
King Alexander II of Scotland (1214 - 1249) granted merchant burgesses the sole right to form a guild – burgesses being citizens in Scotland willing to accept public responsibilities. The Burgesses of Guild of the City of Aberdeen takes its founding date as 27 February 1214. Yet Aberdeen burgesses are first mentioned in historic records as far back as 1124 when Aberdeen became a royal burgh. From 1214 the Guildry body influenced the composition of the town council and therefore, city affairs. The Burgesses of Guild were a part of the council for more than 700 years and played a significant role in the growth and development of Aberdeen.

Burgesses took an oath to further Aberdeen's economic interests; to pay taxes; and to defend the city against enemies. New burgesses, on being admitted, had to donate a weapon to the city armoury, pay an entry fee which went toward the Common Good fund, and to pay for a large meal for the councillors and provost. Being a burgess was exclusively for males, and certain classes (fishermen, clergy and lawyers) were excluded.

Burgesses took an active roll in the regulation of local markets, and the collection of the king's taxes. In return they were granted privileges, including exemption from toll charges. From the mid 14th century a rift began between the guild's merchants and craftsmen. Despite this the two groups united under Robert Davidson, Provost of Aberdeen to defend against the army raised by the Lord of the Isles at the Battle of Harlaw in 1411. The merchants remained as the Burgesses of Guild, and the craftsmen become the Seven Incorporated Trades of Aberdeen.

== Recent history ==
As the privileges and rights of burgesses declined, and the need for their role in preserving customs and laws diminished, including the reform brought by the Royal Burghs Reform Act 1833, membership of the guildry declined significantly. At the start of the 1800s, there were about 1,000 burgesses – around 1 in 40 of the city's population. By 1817 it was 820, and by 1867 members had dwindled to 337. This continued in the 20th century. In 1974 there were 336 members – and 300 by 1981. Things turned around in the 1980s as Aberdeen's population swelled due to the oil industry in the North Sea. By the year 2000 the number of members increased to 850. In 2023 the number of burgesses was around 1,100.

In the 1980s another significant change occurred with the first seven women burgesses being admitted in 1983.

On 27 February 2015, 500 attendees celebrated the 800th anniversary of the burgesses at a meal at Beach Ballroom Aberdeen.

== (Lord) Deans of Guild ==
The title of `Dean of Guild' – i.e. the senior official representing the guild – came into being in 1427 Prior to that date they were led by the burgh alderman, later the provost. From that first date until 1833 the dean was an official of the town council, and he was so appointed. Following the Royal Burghs (Scotland) Act 1833 deans of Scottish guilds were made constituent members of the town councils, appointed by their members, and not elected by public vote.

Originally, the dean was charged with enforcing burgh regulations relating to trade, and for overseeing the upkeep of council property. He upheld the liberties of the burgh. For example in the 16th century the dean of the time was sent with armed men to arrest a Norwegian ship illegally landing cargo at Newburgh. He routinely supervised the loading of ships bound of foreign ports. In 1597 the dean supervised the burning of several witches, and the execution of pirates.

In February 2015 the Lord Lyon of Scotland bestowed the title of Lord Dean of Guild to the Aberdeen Burgesses of Guild, Colin Taylor being the first to take up this new title.

For the first time, in 2022, Aberdeen Burgesses of Guild appointed Sylvia Halkerston as the first Lady Lord Dean.

=== Deans of Guild since 1833 ===
==== 19th-century deans ====
From	To	Dean	description
1833	1834	Thomas Bannerman	merchant
1834	1835	Alexander Forbes	merchant
1835	1837	Nei Smith jnr.	merchant
1837	1838	Peter Williamson	druggist
1838	1839	Leslie Clark	merchant
1839	1840	Peter WIlliamson	
1840	1842	George Thomson jnr.	shipowner, Provost, MP for Aberdeen
1842	1843	James B McCombie	advocate
1843	1845	Alexander Milne	merchant
1845	1847	James Hadden	manufacturer
1847	1849	Alexander Gordon	advocate
1849	1851	George B Bothwell	candle manufacturer
1851	1853	George Inglis	merchant
1853	1855	Alexander Nicol	shipowner, Lord Provost
1857	1860	George Thomson	merchant
1860	1863	George Jamieson	merchant, Lord Provost
1863	1866	George B Bothwell	
1866	1869	George Jamieson	
1869	1871	Hugh Ross	
1871	1873	Lewis Smith	bookseller
1873	1880	Alexander Walker	merchant
1880	1885	John Sangster	druggist
1885	1889	David Stewart	manufacturer, Lord Provost
1889	1895	David Macdonald	
1895	1902	James Walker	merchant, Lord Provost

==== 20th-century Deans ====
From	To	Name	Description
1902	1905	Alexander Lyon	hide and tallow merchant, Lord Provost
1905	1911	James Murray	North Inveramsey
1911	1919	William Meff	fish merchant, Lord Provost
1919	1925	Harry A Holmes	trawler owner
1925	1927	David M Kilgour	merchant
1927	1935	John Spencer of Binghill	
1935	1942	Robert Littlejohn	merchant
1942	1950	Joseph Bisset	engineer
1950	1955	George Strathdee	baker
1955	1971	James R Donald	director
1971	1981	James R Leith	shipowner, MD Ellis & McHardy
1981	1998	Bill Wylie	seedman
1998	2002	Bill MkKimmie	architect

==== 21st-century deans and lord deans ====
From	To	Name	Description
2002	2006	Andrew Lewis	
2006	2015	Fred Dalgarno	
2015	2022	Colin Taylor	first Lord Dean of Guild
2022	2026	Sylvia Halkerston	first female Lord Dean
2026	Present	Mike Wilson	
