= Plant badge =

Scottish emblem, often a plant

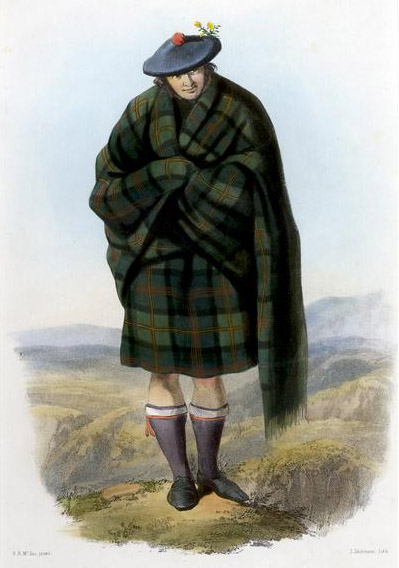
A Victorian era, romantic depiction of a Highlander, clothed in a belted plaid, by R. R. McIan. The Highlander depicted is a MacLennan, who is wearing a sprig of furze as his clan badge.

A clan badge, sometimes called a plant badge, is a badge or emblem, usually a sprig of a specific plant, that is used to identify a member of a particular Scottish clan. They are usually worn affixed to the bonnet behind the Scottish crest badge, or pinned at the shoulder of a lady's tartan sash. According to popular lore clan badges were used by Scottish clans as a means of identification in battle. An authentic example of plants being used in this way (though not by a clan) were the sprigs of oats used by troops under the command of Montrose during the sack of Aberdeen. Similar items are known to have been used by military forces in Scotland, like paper, or the "White Cockade" (a bunch of white ribbon) of the Jacobites.

== Authenticity ==
Despite popular lore, many clan badges attributed to Scottish clans would be completely impractical for use as a means of identification. Many would be unsuitable, even for a modern clan gathering, let alone a raging clan battle. Also, a number of the plants (and flowers) attributed as clan badges are only available during certain times of year. Even though it is maintained that clan badges were used long before the Scottish crest badges used today, according to a former Lord Lyon King of Arms the oldest symbols used at gatherings were heraldic flags such as the banner, standard and pinsel.

There is much confusion as to why some clans have been attributed more than one clan badge. Several 19th-century writers variously attributed plants to clans, many times contradicting each other. It has been claimed by one writer that if a clan gained new lands it may have also acquired that district's "badge" and used it along with their own clan badge. It is clear however, that there are several large groups of clans which share badges and also share a historical connection. The Clan Donald group (clans Macdonald, Macdonald of Clanranald, Macdonell of Glengarry, MacDonald of Keppoch) and clans/septs which have been associated with Clan Donald (like certain MacIntyres and the Macqueens of Skye) all have common heath attributed as their badge. Another large group is the Clan Chattan group (clans Mackintosh, Macpherson, Macgillivray, Macqueen, Macbain, Farquharson, Davidson) which have been attributed red whortleberry (sometimes called cranberry in Scotland), or bearberry, or boxwood. The leaves of these three plants are very similar, and at least one writer has claimed that whatever plant which happened to be available was used. One group, the Siol Alpin group, of clans are said to have claimed or are thought to share a common descent. The Siol Alpin clans (clans Grant, Gregor, MacAulay, Macfie, Macnab, Mackinnon, Macquarrie) are all attributed the clan badge of pine (Scots fir). In some cases, clan badges are derived from the heraldry of clan chiefs. For example, the Farquharsons have pine attributed as a clan badge of theirs (pine also appears on the uniforms of the Invercauld Highlanders). Pine was actually used in the Invercauld Arms as a mark of cadencing to the basic Shaw-Mackintosh Arms.

== Plants used as badges ==
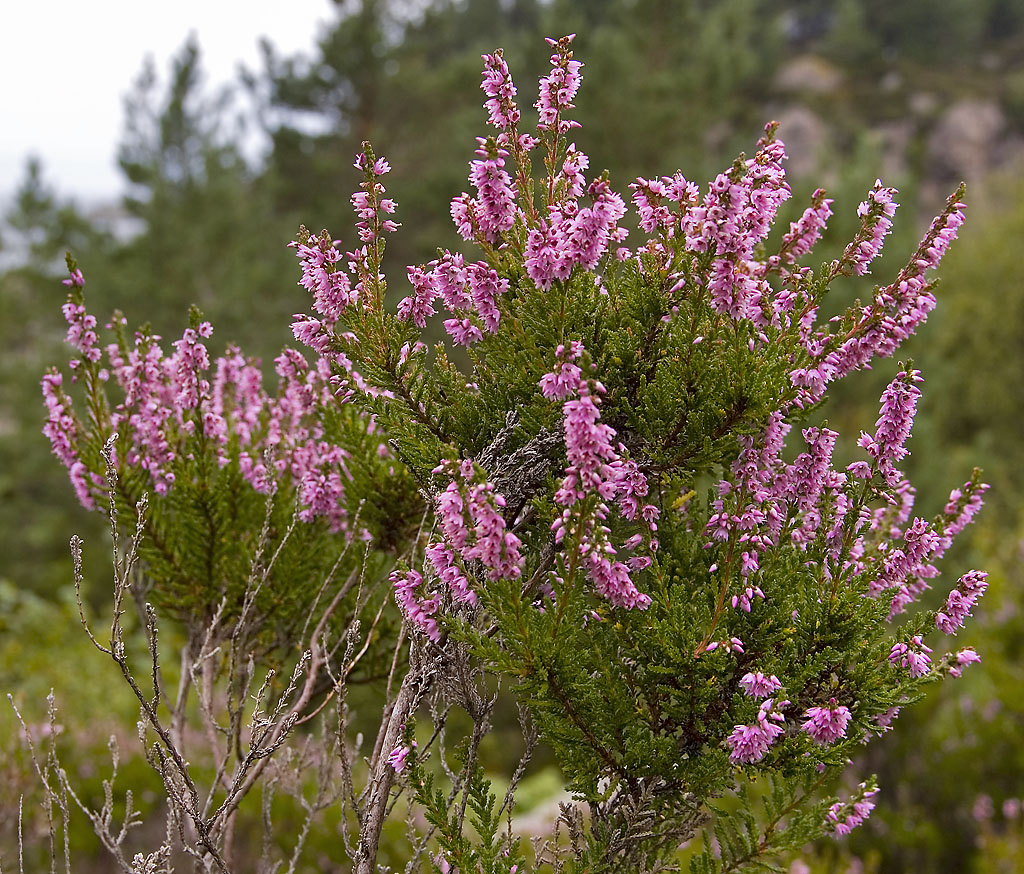
Calluna vulgaris or Common Heather. Clan badge of the clans of Clan Donald.

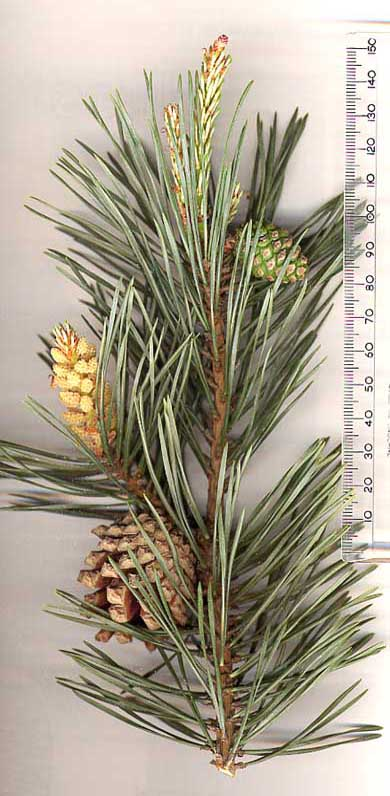
Scots Pine has been attributed at some point to all the clans of Siol Alpin.

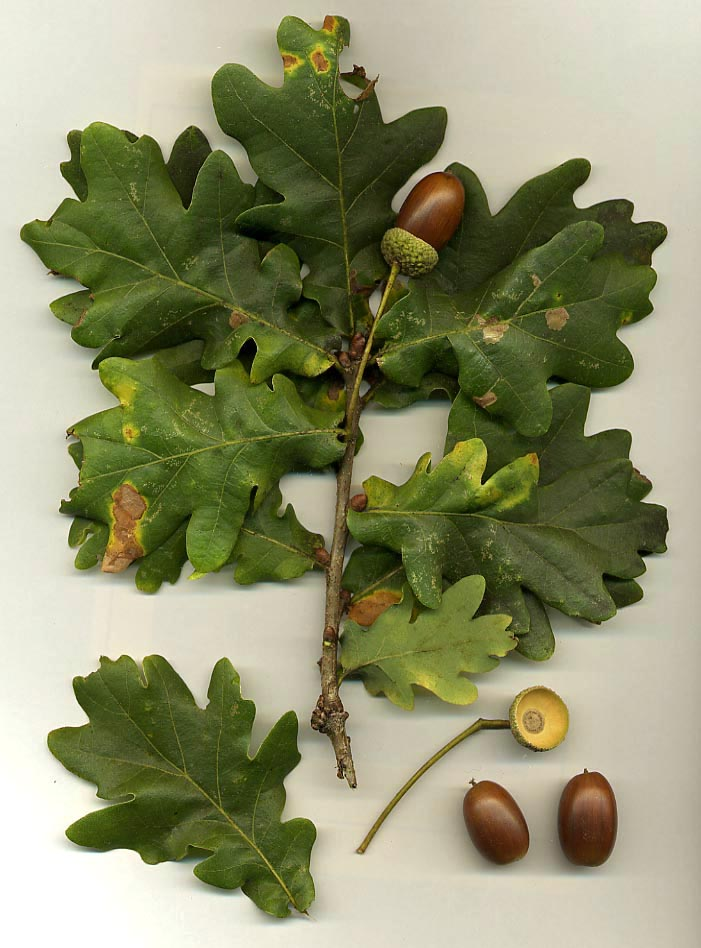
Oak, attributed to the Buchanans, Camerons, Kennedys, Macfies, Stewarts, and Woods.

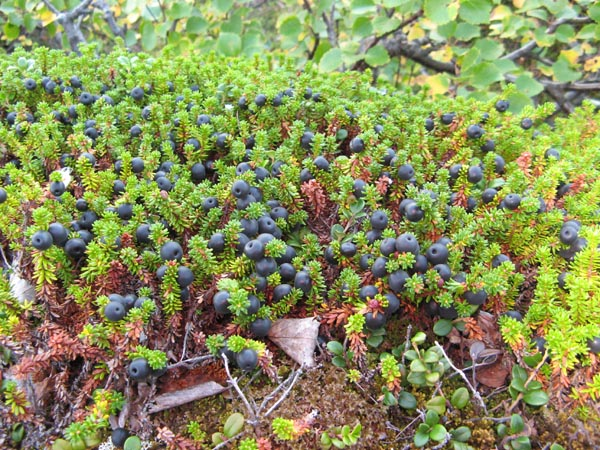
Crowberry, attributed to the Camerons, Macfies, and Macleans.

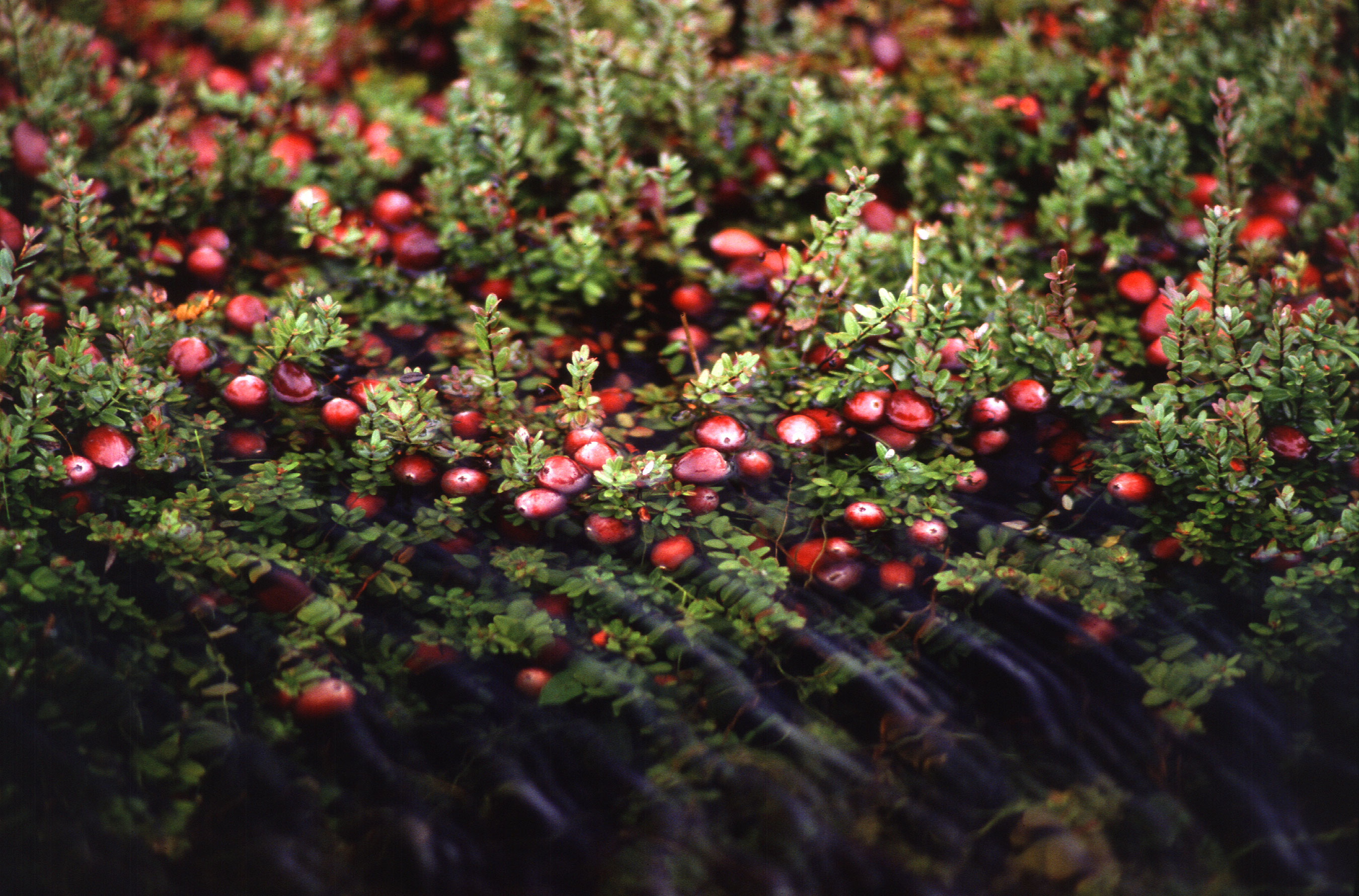
Cranberry has been attributed to the MacAulays and Macfarlanes. Both clans were centred in western Dunbartonshire. The Macfarlanes claim descent from the original Earls of Lennox. While no conclusive link exists for the MacAulays their descent from the same earls has been theorised.

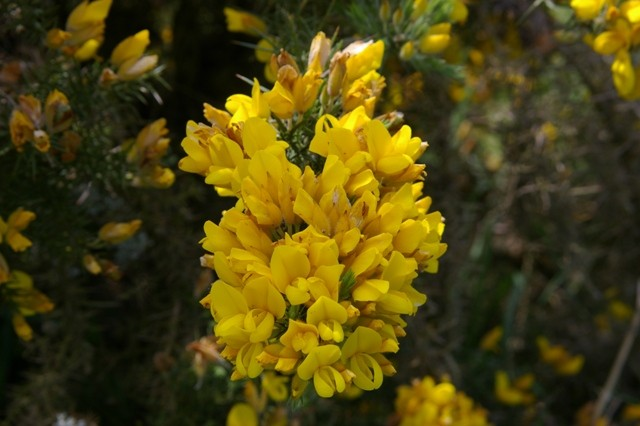
Furze (also known as Gorse) has been attributed to the Carruthers, Logans, MacLennans, and Sinclairs. The Logans and MacLennans have been associated with each other by several 19th century writers, notably James Logan (note both clans also share the same tartan).

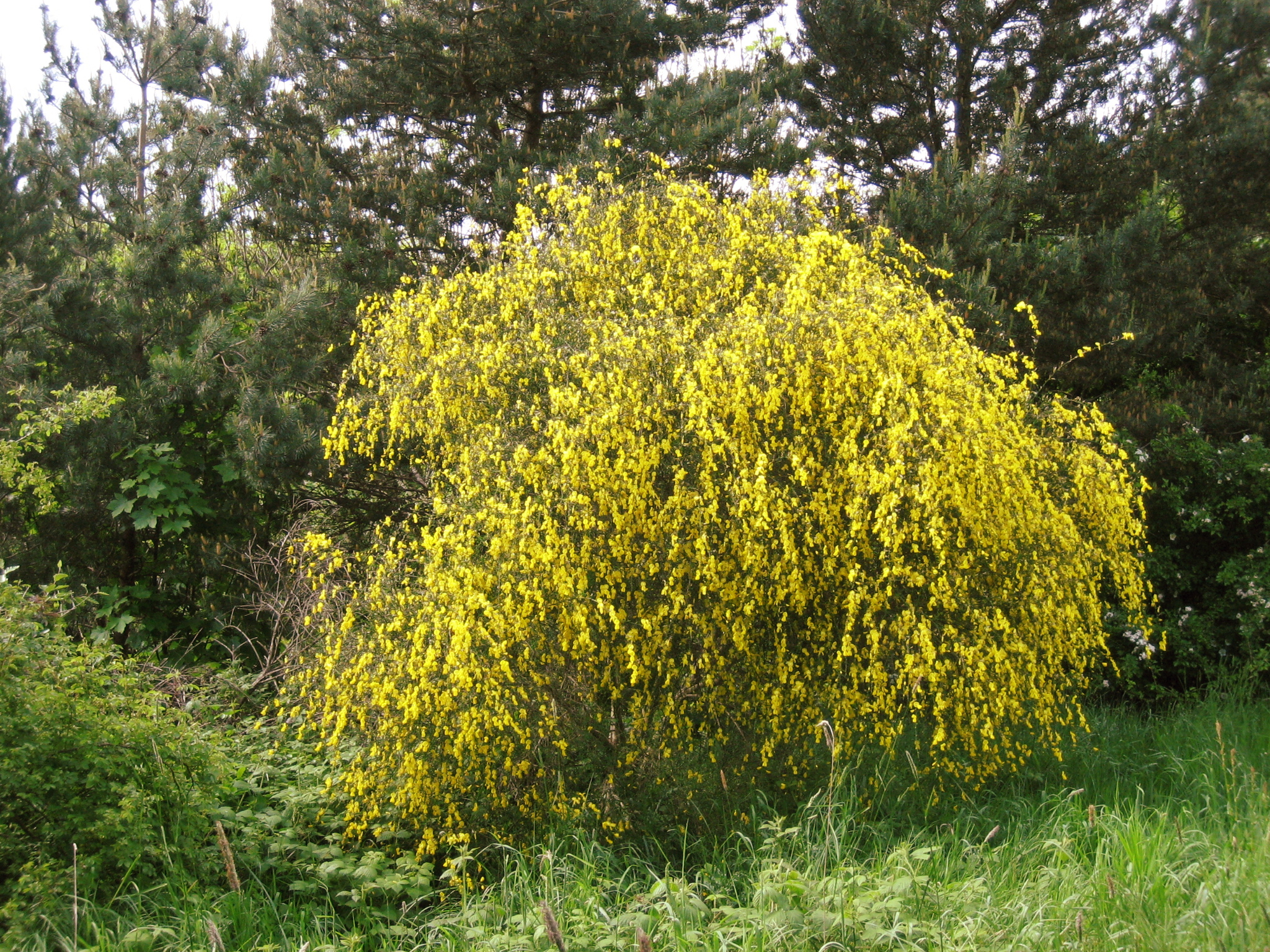
Broom, attributed to the Forbes, Homes, Mathesons, and Murrays.

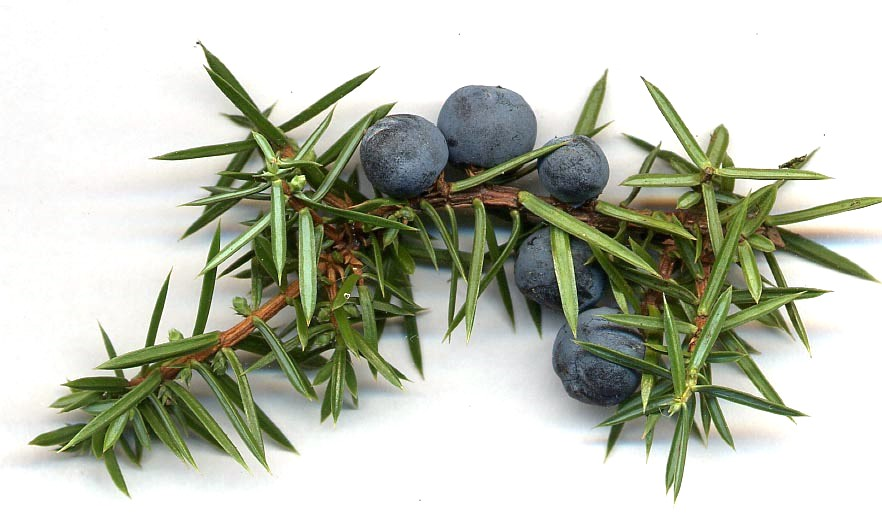
Juniper, attributed to the Gunn, Macleods, Murrays, Nicolsons, and Rosses.

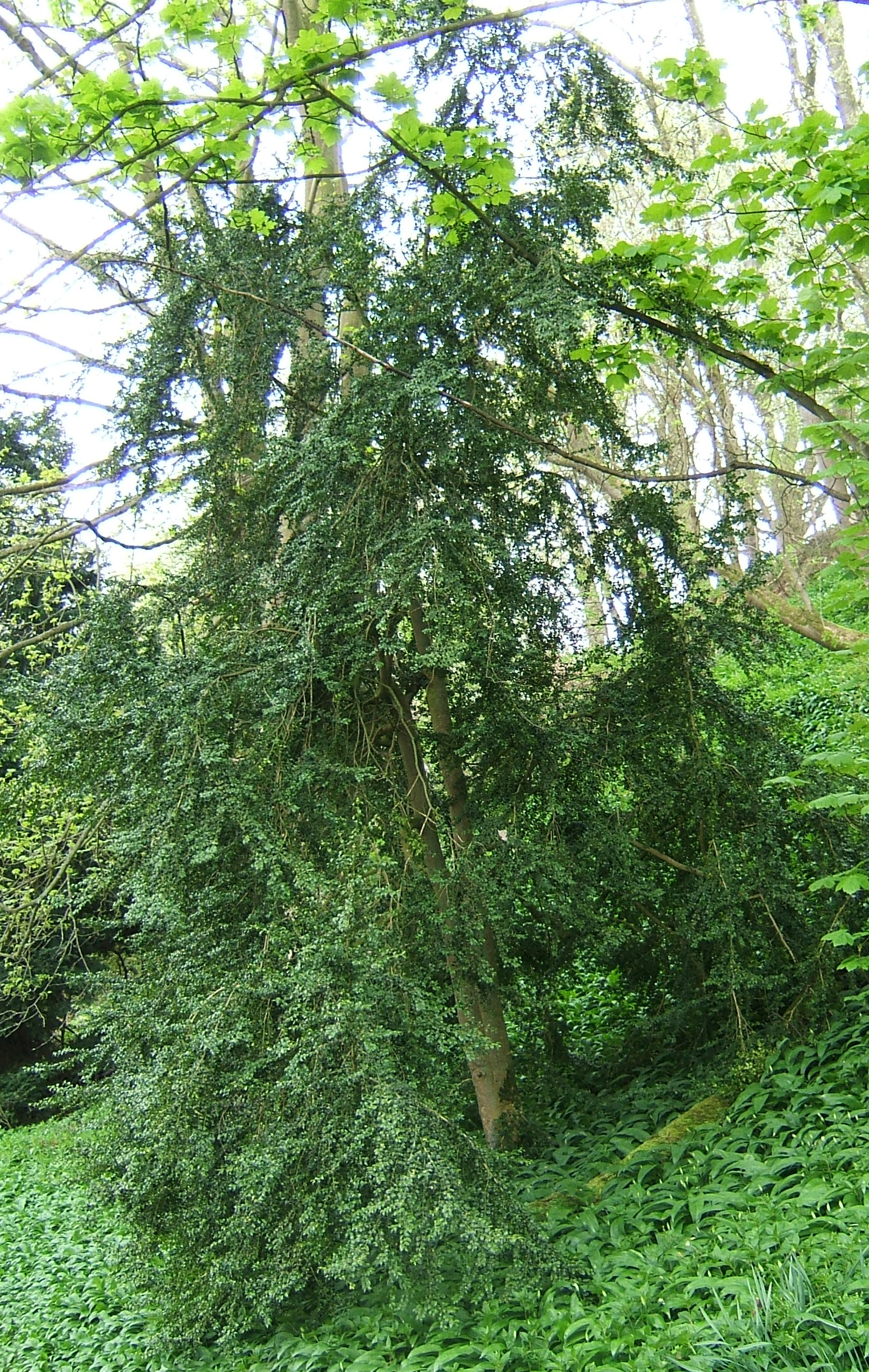
Boxwood, attributed to the Davidsons, Macbains, MacDuffs, Macgillivrays, Macqueens.

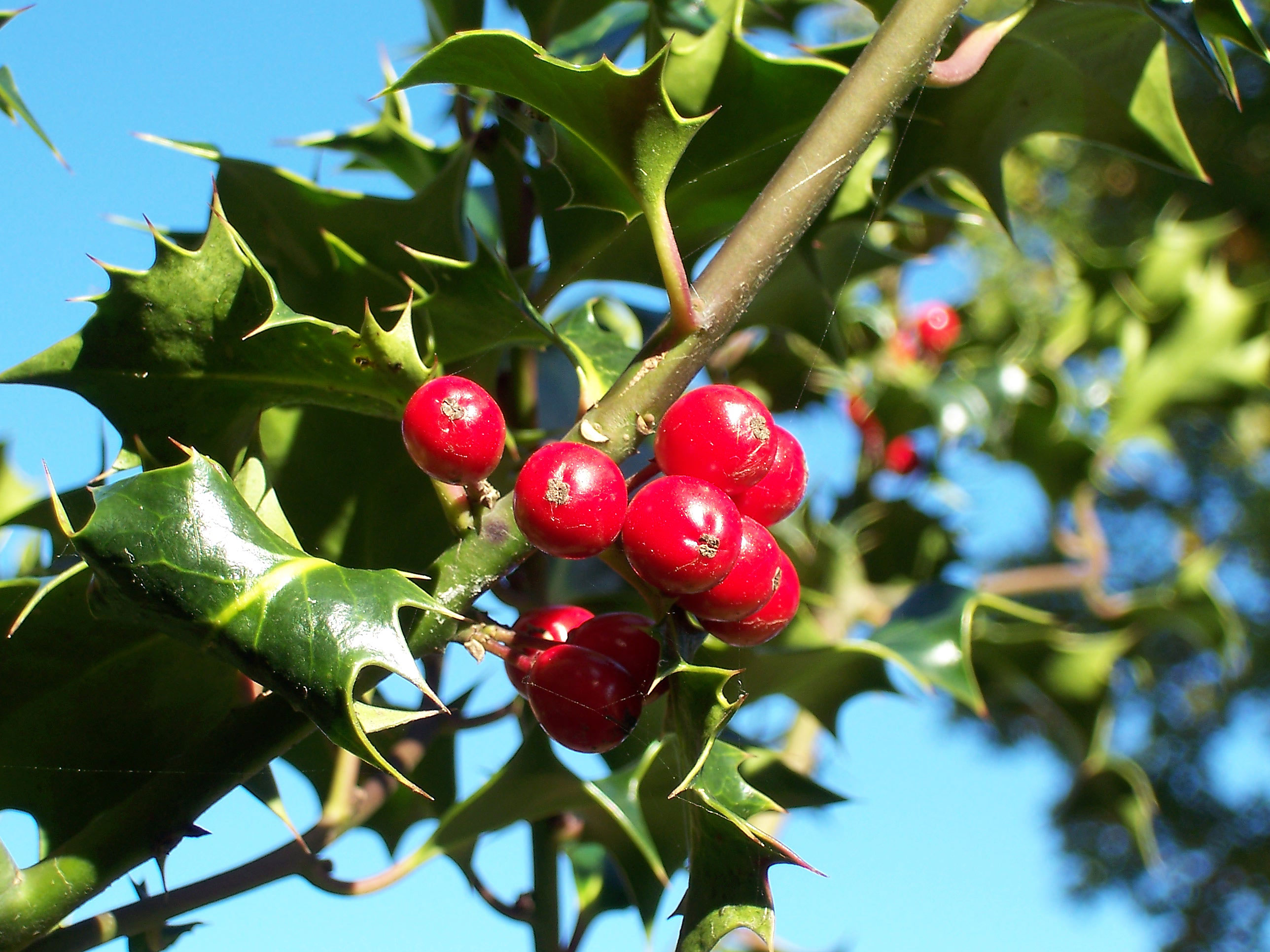
Holly, attributed to the Drummonds, MacInneses, MacMillans, Mathesons.

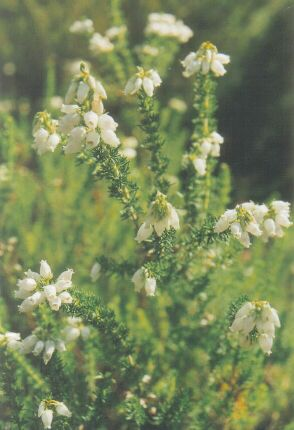
Bell Heather, attributed to the MacDougalls.

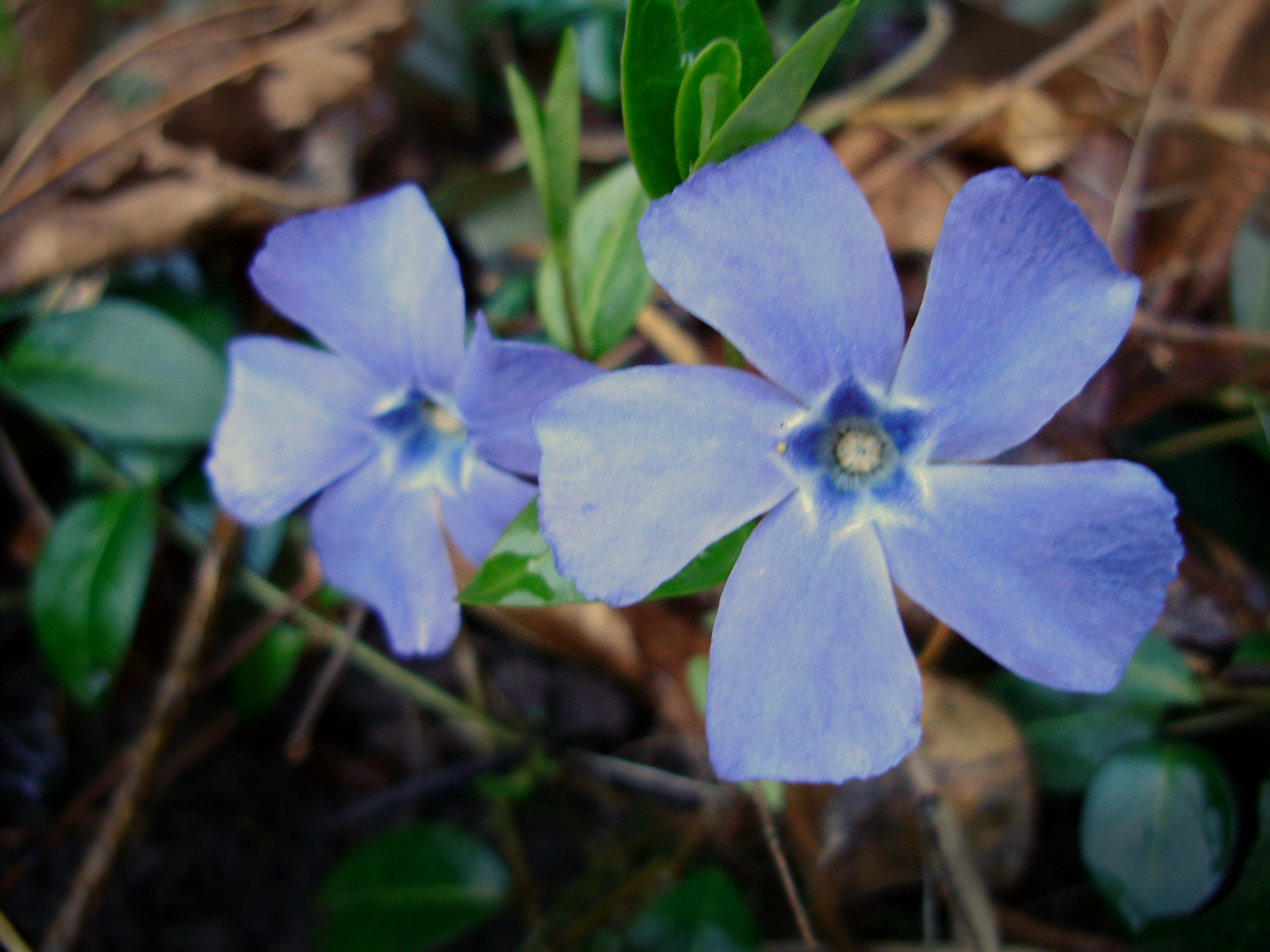
Lesser periwinkle, attributed to the Maclachlans.

Clan name	Plant badge attributed to the clan	Notes
Arthur	wild myrtle	
Arthur	fir club moss	
Boyd	Laurel leaves	
Brodie	periwinkle	
Bruce	rosemary	
Buchanan	bilberry (blaeberry)	
Buchanan	oak	
Buchanan	birch	
Cameron	crowberry	
Cameron	oak	
Campbell	fir club moss	
Campbell	wild myrtle (or bog myrtle)	Though abundant in Argyll, Bog Myrtle drops its leaves in winter.
Chattan	wild whortleberry	
Chisholm	fern	
Cochrane	sea holly	
Colquhoun	hazel	
Colquhoun	dogberry	
Cumming	common sallow; i.e., the pussy willow	
Davidson	boxwood	
Davidson	red whortleberry	
Donnachaidh	bracken, or fern	The Celtic Magazine of 1884 states that this badge (fern), compared to fine leaved heath, is the older badge.
Donnachaidh	fine leaved heath	
Drummond	holly	
Drummond	Wild thyme	
Farquharson	Scots fir	
Farquharson	red whortleberry	
Farquharson	foxglove	
Fergusson	little sunflower	
Forbes	broom	
Fraser	yew	
Gordon	ivy	
Graham	Laurel	Originally the badge was Spurge Laurel, but as that plant is poisonous and not indigenous to Scotland, James, 8th Duke of Montrose petitioned the Lord Lyon to have the True Laurel (Laurus Nobilis) recognised as the clan plant badge, which petition he was granted.
Grant	pine (Scots fir)	
Gregor	pine (Scots fir)	
Grierson	Scottish bluebell	
Gunn	juniper	
Gunn	roseroot	
Hannay	periwinkle	
Hay	mistletoe	
Henderson	cotton grass	
Home	broom	
Innes	great bulrush	
Jardine	apple blossom	
Johnstone	red hawthorn	
Kennedy	oak	
Lamont	crab-apple tree	
Lamont	trefoil	
Lamont	dryas	
Logan	furze	
MacAlister	common heath	
MacAulay	pine (Scots fir)	
MacAulay	cranberry	
MacBain	boxwood	
MacBain	red whortleberry	
MacDonald	common heath (Scots heather)	
Macdonald of Clanranald	common heath	
MacDonald of Keppoch	common heath	
MacDonald of Keppoch	white heather	
MacDonell of Glengarry	common heath	
MacDougall	bell heather	
MacDougall	cypress	
MacDuff	boxwood	
MacDuff	red whortleberry	
Macfarlane	cranberry	
Macfarlane	cloudberry	
Macfie	pine (Scots fir)	
Macfie	oak	
Macfie	crowberry	
MacGillivray	boxwood	
MacGillivray	red whortleberry	
MacInnes	holly	
MacIntyre	common heath	
Mackay	great bulrush	
Mackay	heather	
Mackenzie	variegated holly	
Mackenzie	deer's grass (heath club rush)	Innes of Learney claimed that heath club rush ('deer's grass') may be confused with club moss ('staghorn moss'). Club moss has also been attributed to the Macraes, who were the Mackenzie's "shirt of mail". Even if it is a confusion both 'deer's grass' and 'staghorn moss' likely refer to caberfeidh ("deer's antlers") in the Mackenzie chiefly arms.
Mackinnon	pine (Scots Fir)	
Mackinnon	St John's wort (St. Columba's flower)	
Mackintosh	red whortleberry	
Mackintosh	bearberry	
Mackintosh	boxwood	
Maclachlan	rowan (mountain ash)	
Maclachlan	lesser periwinkle	
Maclaine of Lochbuie	bilberry (blaeberry)	
Maclaine of Lochbuie	bramble	
Maclaine of Lochbuie	holly	
Maclaine of Lochbuie	black berry heath	
MacLaren	laurel	
MacLea	The Flower of the Grass of Parnassus.	
Maclean	crowberry	
Maclean	holly	
MacLennan	furze	
MacLeod	juniper	
Macleod of the Lewes	red whortleberry	
MacMillan	holly	
Macnab	stone bramble	
Macnab	common heath	
Macnaghten	trailing azalea	
MacNeil	Dryas (avens)	
MacNeil	trefoil	This clan badge may actually be attributed to the McNeills of Gigha, a branch of Clan MacNeil. Trefoil has also been attributed to the Lamonts, another clan in Argyl. The Lamonts and MacNeils/McNeills both claim descent from the same O'Neill who settled in Scotland in the Middle Ages.
Macpherson	white heather	
Macpherson	boxwood	
Macpherson	red whortleberry	
Macquarrie	pine (Scots fir)	
Macqueen	boxwood	
Macqueen	red whortleberry	
Macrae	club moss	Club moss sometimes referred to as staghorn grass, may refer to the Mackenzie chiefly arms, or at least the Macrae's close association with the Mackenzies.
Malcolm (MacCallum)	rowan berries	
Matheson	broom	
Matheson	holly	
Menzies	Menzies's heath	Probably intended to be blue heath, Phyllodoce caerulea, a very rare member of the heather family, Ericaceae, found on several Scottish mountains. Its scientific name has changed since it was first found more than two centuries ago on the Sow of Atholl, but for much of the 19th century it was called Menziesia caerulea. Hence the reputed association with Clan Menzies. Menziesia was coined by James Edward Smith in 1793 to honour the Scottish physician and naturalist Dr Archibald Menzies (1754- 1842) who was attached to Capt. George Vancouver's circumnavigation, 1790-1795. The original ("type") species was Menziesia ferruginea, now named Rhododendron menziesii, a native of northwestern North America. No plants are now assigned to Menziesia which has been subsumed into Rhododendron. The name "Menzies's heath" is unknown in botanical literature.
Menzies	ash As mentioned	
Moncreiffe	oak	Oak-leaves appear on a stone carving of the 12th laird's heraldic mantling of 1634.
Morrison	driftwood	
Munro	common club moss	
Murray	butcher's broom	
Murray	juniper	
Nicolson	juniper	
Ogilvy	whitethorn, hawthorn	
Ogilvy	evergreen alkanet	
Oliphant	bull rush	
Ramsay	blue harebell	
Rose	wild rosemary	
Ross	juniper	
Ross	bearberry	The 19th-century historian W. F. Skene listed this clan's badge as uva ursi, which is sometimes known as bearberry.
Seton	yew	
Scott	blaeberry	
Sinclair	furze (whin)	
Sinclair	white clover	
Stewart	oak Thistle	
Sutherland	butcher's broom, cotton sedge	
Urquhart	wallflower, gillyflower	
Wood	Oak	The oak is featured prominently on the shields of all the Woods' coats of arms.

== See also ==
- Flora of Scotland
- Language of flowers
- Scottish crest badge

== Bibliography ==
- The Scottish Clans And Their Tartans: With Notes (Library ed.). Edinburgh: W. & A. K. Johnston.
- Adam, Frank; Innes of Learney, Thomas (1970). The Clans, Septs & Regiments of the Scottish Highlands (8th ed.). Edinburgh: Johnston and Bacon.
- Anderson, William (1862). The Scottish Nation; Or The Surnames, Families, Literature, Honours, And Biographical History Of The People Of Scotland. Vol. 1. Edinburgh: A. Fullarton & Co.
- Campbell of Airds, Alastair (2002). A History of Clan Campbell: Volume 2: From Flodden to the Restoration. Edinburgh: Edinburgh University Press. ISBN 1-902930-18-5.
- Mackenzie, Alexander (1884). The Celtic Magazine; a monthly periodical devoted to the literature, history, antiquities, folk lore, traditions, and the social and material interests of the Celt at home and abroad. Vol. 9. Inverness: A. & W. Mackenzie.
- Moncreiffe of that Ilk, Iain. The Highland Clans. London: Barrie & Rockliff, 1967.
- Skene, William Forbes (1902). MacBain, Alexander (ed.). The Highlanders of Scotland. Stirling, Scotland: E. Mackay.
