= Clan MacBean =

Highland Scottish clan

- MacBheathain
- Crest: Wildcat holding a shield known as a Targe
- Motto: Touch Not A Catt Bot A Targe
- War cry: Kinchyle

Profile
- Region: Highland
- District: Inverness
- Plant badge: Boxwood or red whortleberry
- Animal: Scottish Wildcat

Chief
- Richard McBain of McBain
- 23rd Chief of the Clan MacBean
- Historic seat: Kinchyle in the parish of Dores, Inverness-shire. Faillie, in Strathnairn, and Tomatin, in Strathdearn.
Septs of Clan MacBean
McBain, Bean, MacBean, McBean, McBeath, MacBeth, Macilvain, MacVean, Bain, (spellings listed in the Clan Chattan Association's literature, but clearly other variant spellings exist)
Clan branches
Principal branches of the family were MacBean of Kinchyle, MacBean of Faillie, MacBean of Tomatin, MacBean of Drummond, the 'Forbes' Macbeans a cadet of the chiefly line of Kinchyle who were descended from Rev. Alexander MacBean of Inverness
Allied clans
Clan Chattan
Clan Mackintosh
Clan MacPhail
Clan Davidson
Clan Macpherson
Clan Shaw of Tordarroch
Clan Farquharson
Clan MacThomas
Clan MacGillivray
Clan MacQueen
MacIntyres of Badenoch
the Macleans of Dochgarroch
Rival clans
Clan Cameron
Clan Gordon
Clan Comyn

Clan MacBean (or Clan MacBain), is a highland Scottish clan and is a member and historic sept of Clan Chattan Confederation.

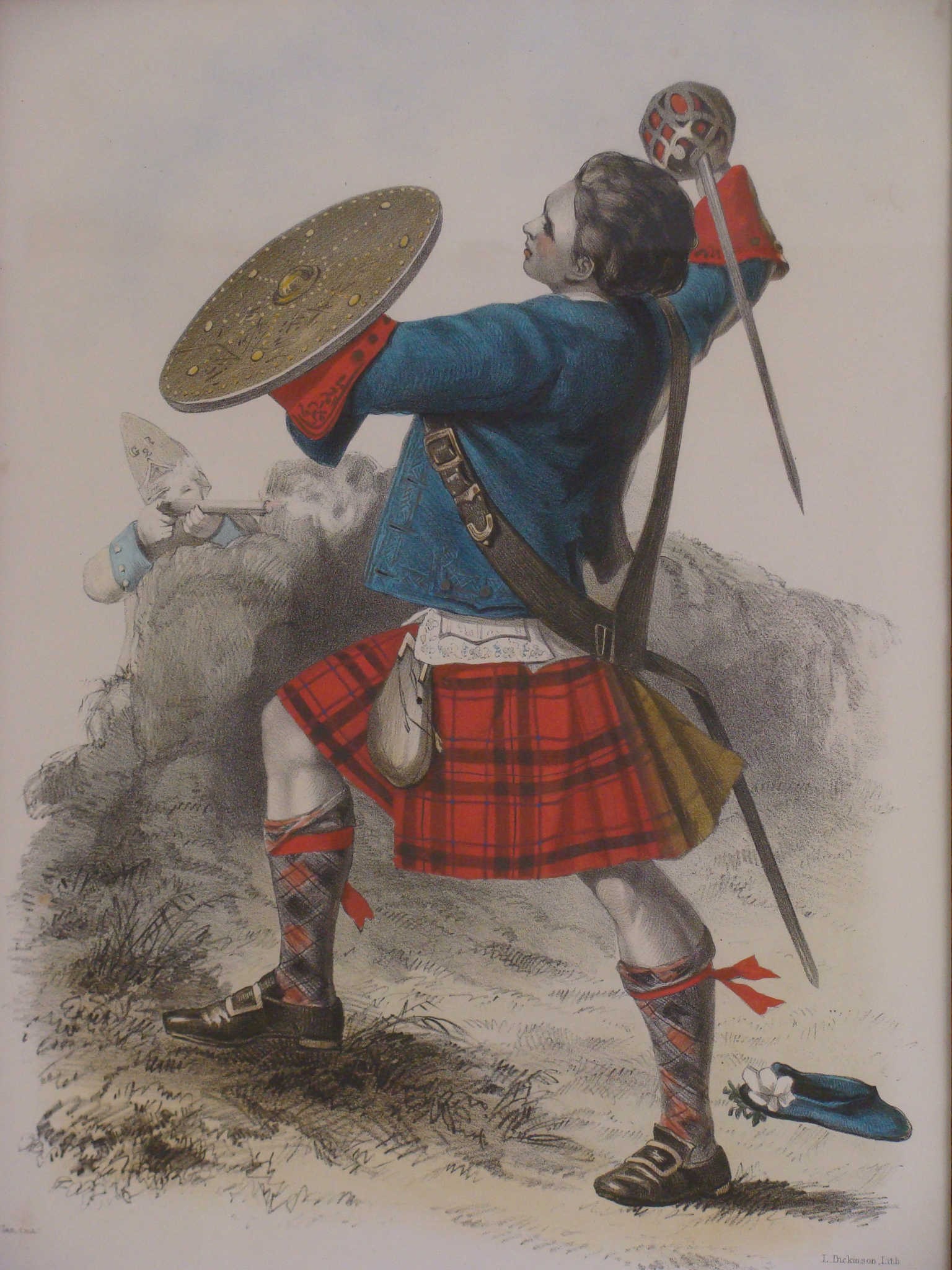
Gillies MacBean at Culloden, 16 April 1746 Gillies was a Major in the Mackintosh regiment who died at the battle of Culloden. His exploits that day passed into legend, recorded in particular detail within John Prebble's book: Culloden, first published in 1962.

== History ==
=== Origins ===
==== Origins of the clan's name ====
There could be several possible Gaelic origins for this name, with bheathain (lively one) being one. Another possible origin for the name is the Gaelic Bàn ('Fair' / 'White' in English), which appears in the name of Scottish King Donald Bàn – the name could be a reference to the colour of his hair and/or the paleness of his face. Donald Bàn's epithet is often seen phonetically anglicised as Bane or Bain.

The first name 'Bean' is also found applied to men from other Clan Chattan families such as Clan Macpherson and Clan Shaw, and Clan MacGillivray.

A third, but perhaps less likely origin of the name is the suggestion that the name originated from 'Beann' (otherwise 'beinn'), which means 'top'/'peak', as applied to the names of mountains such as Beinn a' Chaorainn in Lochaber and Britain's highest mountain Ben Nevis (Gaelic: Beinn Nibheis). If the name did arise from 'Beann' then one might assume it was a reference to the height of the person it was applied to.

An authoritative view on the origin of the name MacBean came from the respected Gaelic academic Dr Alexander MacBain who, in his An Etymological Dictionary of the Gaelic Language, wrote the following words:

MAC-BEAN, G (i.e. Gaelic). McBheathain, from Beathan, Englished as Bean (1490, Beane, 1481) or Benjamin: *Bitâtagno-s, life's son, from beatha, life, with the termination -agno-s, meaning "descendant of," Eng. -ing, now used like the Eng. to form diminutives. Also Mac-bain, Mac-vean.

If one pronounces the name McBheathain without use of the usual English "th", but lightly skip over it, as one would do in Gaelic, one can easily see how the name was then written as MacBean, McBain etc. In view of Dr Alexander MacBain's eminent Gaelic scholarship, it is his etymology of the name that can be most trusted, and this is the origin of the name that the Clan MacBean follows.

BAIN, from G (i.e. Gaelic). Bàn, white. The Bains of Tulloch appear in the sixteenth century variously as Bayne or Bane, with a contemporary near them called John Makferquhair McGillebane (1555). This last name is now McIlle-bhàin, "Fair-gille," rendered into Eng. by Whyte; whence also McGilvane.

Some MacBeans dropped the use of 'Mac'/'Mc', resulting in the surnames 'Bean' and (phonetically) 'Bain'. This has understandably caused confusion with the similarly named Bains of Tulloch who were not part of the Clan MacBean (McBain), but were in fact a branch of the Clan Mackay, who had changed their surname to Bain, after a forebear who was nicknamed 'Bàn'. Despite the lack of relationship between the Bains (Baynes) of Tulloch and Clan MacBean, a slight connection came later when Kenneth Bayne, 8th Laird of Tulloch sold the estate to his cousin Henry Davidson, whose successors became chiefs of Clan Davidson, members of Clan Chattan like the MacBeans.

==== Early history – descent from Gillichattan Mor and Clan Chattan ====
History and tradition ascribes the MacBeans as being among the descendants of Gillichattan Mor more commonly known as Clan Chattan. An early record of the name in its more modern form appeared in the Kinrara manuscript, which names both Bean McCoil voir and his son, Milmoir McBean.

Charles Fraser-Mackintosh provides some helpful information about the clan's origins:

The Macbean territory lay chiefly in the parish of Dores, as may be seen from the preponderance of the name on the tombstones in the churchyard, represented by Kinchyle and Drummond as heritors.

They were represented in Strathnairn by Macbean of Faillie, and in Strathdearn by Macbean of Tomatin. Kinchyle was undoubted head, and signs the Bond of Union among the Clan Chattan in 1609; the Bond of Maintenance of 1664; and finally, in 1756, the Letter of Authority from the Clan to Mackintosh, to redeem the Loch Laggan estate.

According to the Rev. Lachlan Shaw, the first Macbean came out of Lochaber, in the suit of Eva, heiress of Clan Chattan, and settled near Inverness. The MS. history of the Mackintoshes says in corroboration, that "Bean vic Coil Mor (of whom the Clan Vean had their denomination) lived in Lochaber, and was a faithful servant to Mackintosh against the Red Comyn, who possessed Inverlochie, who was a professed enemy of Mackintosh."

Again the manuscript records that Myles Mac-Bean vic-Coil-Mor and his four sons, Paul, Gillies, Myles and Farquhar, after they had slain the Red Comyn's steward and his two servants Patten and Kissen, came to William Mackintosh, seventh of Mackintosh (son of Eva), in Connage, in Pettie, where he then dwelt, and for themselves and their posterity took protection and dependence of him and his, as their chief. This occurring about 1334, establishes the Macbeans as one of the oldest tribes of historic Clan Chattan.

The Mackintosh history, referring to the battle of Harlaw (1411), narrates that "Mackintosh lost in this battle many of his friends and people, especially of the Clan Vean." This loss so greatly depressed the Macbeans that I am unable to trace the succession from this period until the time of Gillies, about 1500.

The Mackintosh history being referred to above is the Kinrara Manuscript, a new edition of which, edited by Dr. Jean Munro, has been published by the Clan Chattan Association.

=== 15th, 16th and 17th centuries ===
The Clan MacBean fought for Domhnall of Islay, Lord of the Isles, along with the rest of Clan Chattan at the Battle of Harlaw in 1411, where they suffered heavy losses. In the history of the Mackintoshes, chiefs of Clan Chattan, it is recorded that "Mackintosh mourned the loss of so many of his friends and people, especially of Clan Vean".

The 12th chief of Clan MacBean was Paul MacBean who due to heavy debts was forced to give up his lands in about 1685. However, the lands were re-granted in the same year by Sir Hugh Campbell of Cawdor (Calder) to Paul's son William MacBean in Kinchyle. William's eldest son Aeneas MacBean, younger of Kinchyle was long thought to have succeeded his father; but he died long before him sometime before 18 May 1722, when he is first mentioned as deceased. Therefore, on William's death sometime between 24 December 1736 and 13 March 1741 the chiefship was inherited by his 2nd son Major Gillies 'Mor' MacBean, who became famous as a result of his heroic exploits and death at the Culloden (see below). Gillies was succeeded as Chief by his son Captain Donald MacBean.

=== 18th century and Jacobite risings ===
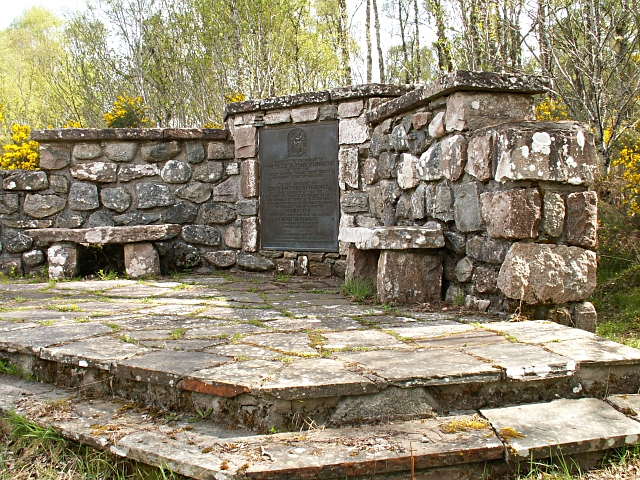
This monument to Clan MacBean is inside the McBain Memorial Park, created by Hughston McBain of McBain, the 21st chief. It lies above Kinchyle near Dores on the south shore of Loch Ness. The site was opened in 1961.

Many of Clan MacBean supported the Jacobite rising of 1715 and as a result many of them were transported to the plantations in Virginia, Maryland and South Carolina. However this did not deter Gillies MacBean (sometimes known as Gillies Mor MacBean), second son of the 12th chief William MacBean of Kinchyle (his older brother was Aeneas MacBean of Kinchyle), from fighting in the Jacobite rising of 1745. Gillies MacBean took up a commission as a major and fought at the Battle of Culloden. He is said to have been at least six feet four inches tall, and the story goes that during the battle he saw government dragoons breaking through to assault highlanders on their flank. Gillies threw himself into the gap and cut down thirteen or fourteen of his assailants, fighting with his back to the wall. Iain Breac MacDonald, who witnessed this, recalled that 'he mowed them down like dockens'. A government officer tried to call back his men to save a fellow brave soldier but MacBean was killed. Also at the Battle of Culloden, a MacBean is credited with assisting the chief of Clan Cameron (Lochiel), who was wounded and unable to walk to escape. Another MacBean, Aeneas MacBean (of Faillie) managed to escape after the battle by repeatedly leaping from one side of a stream to another until his pursuers were forced to give up. However, this is unlikely to have been Aeneas/Angus MacBean, Tacksman of Faillie, since he is listed among the officers of Lady Anne Mackintosh's Clan Chattan regiment who were killed at the battle.

After the Battle of Culloden, the chief struggled to keep his lands and they were sold in 1760. In 1778 Lieutenant General Forbes Macbean was appointed the commander of artillery in Canada.

=== Later clansmen ===
William MacBean extraordinarily rose from the rank of private to Major General and won the Victoria Cross for gallantry during the Indian Mutiny in 1858.

Forbes MacBean, another of the well known military family descended from Reverend Alexander MacBean of Inverness (mentioned above), was mentioned in dispatches in 1897 when serving as a Major in the Gordon Highlanders, for the gallant and courageous action in taking the heights of Dargai near the border of Afghanistan, in India's old north west province, which is now part of Pakistan. Various accounts of this action have been written. Forbes Macbean later commanded the Gordon Highlanders regiment against the Boers of South Africa in 1899 during the Second Boer War. He is mentioned in an account of the bravery of the Gordon Highlanders at Doornkop (or Florida), south-west of Johannesburg. John Stirling recorded in his book 'Our Regiments in South Africa 1899-1902' that The Gordons were led by Lieut.-Colonel Burney and by Colonel Forbes Macbean, who has perhaps seen more hard fighting than any officer now alive and with his regiment.

=== The Clan in Modern Times ===
The chiefly line of the clan has flourished in Canada and the United States in the 20th century.

The present chiefs descend from a younger brother of Aeneas and Gillies 'Mor' MacBean, the two elder sons of William MacBean of Kinchyle. Aeneas had a surviving daughter Margaret who on 22 July 1765 was served as heir "of provision" to her father, and his brother Gillies' heir to Kinchyle was his son Captain Donald MacBean, who left two daughters as his heirs. The chiefly line did not continue through any of these daughters, but instead continued through Aeneas and Gillies' youngest brother John. The copy of the grant of arms of McBain of McBain by The Lord Lyon to Hughston McBain as 21st chief (having succeeded his older cousin Stewart McBain of Glenbain in Saskatchewan) confirms that the line of succession passed via Hughston's great-great-grandfather William McBean 'in Pitourie' in the parish of Alvie, in the district of Badenoch, and states: Which William was great-grandson and eventual Representative of William McBean of Kinchyle, Chief of the Clan McBain. This matriculation was listed in The Edinburgh Gazette, 27 May 1966.

On the death of the 21st Chief, Hughston McBain of McBain, on 19 May 1977, his son James McBain of McBain succeeded him, becoming the Clan's 22nd Hereditary Chief, who himself died on 7 March 2022 in Tucson, Arizona, USA, in his 94th year. He was automatically succeeded on his death by his son Richard McBain of McBain, who is now the 23rd Hereditary Chief of the Clan MacBean. It was announced that a ceremony of inauguration was to be held in Inverness-shire on the weekend of 6–7 August 2022. The new Chief, Richard McBain of McBain was inaugurated as Chief as planned, at the McBain Memorial Park above the village of Dores and Loch Ness on Saturday 6 August 2022, by The Lord Lyon King of Arms, The Reverend Canon Joseph Morrow CVO CBE KStJ KC DL FRSE, alongside the clan's Seanachaidh. At the same time a new Memorial to the clan's famous Astronaut Captain LaVern Bean was dedicated. The following day, wreaths were laid at the Culloden Memorial Cairn by the Chief and Iain MacGillivray the Commander of Clan MacGillivray, in memory of the two clans' chiefs – the cousins Colonel Alexander MacGillivray of Dunmaglass and Major Gillies 'Mor' MacBean, of Lady Anne Mackintosh's (Clan Chattan) Regiment, their clansmen and all others who fell in the battle.

=== Notable descendants ===
Capt. Alan Bean, an astronaut and the fourth man to walk on the Moon, took with him the MacBean tartan on his 1969 mission to the Moon. "As I remember it, I took Clan MacBean tartan to the moon and returned it to Earth. I did not leave any Clan MacBean Tartan on the surface. I did, in fact, give a piece of the tartan to the Clan MacBean and also to the St. Bean Chapel in Scotland."

Judge Roy Bean, an American saloon-keeper and Justice of the Peace who called himself "The Only Law West of the Pecos". According to legend, he held court in his saloon along the Rio Grande on a desolate stretch of the Chihuahuan Desert of southwest Texas. Western films and books cast him as "The Hanging Judge" although he is known to have sentenced only two men to hang.

== Chiefs' Home ==
- Kinchyle, which is six miles south-west of Inverness, was the historic seat of the chiefs of Clan MacBean until it was sold in 1759.

== See also ==
- Scottish clan
