= Clan MacGillivray =

Highland Scottish clan

- Motto: Touch not this cat
- War cry: Dunmaghlas

Profile
- Plant badge: Boxwood & Red Whortleberry
- Pipe music: "Loch Moidh" (Loch Moy)
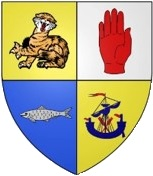
- Clan MacGillivray no longer has a chief, and is an armigerous clan
- Historic seat: Dunmaglas Gaelic: ( Dun mac Glais; Fort of the sons of Glas. It may also be: Dun magh glas; Mound of the green field)
- Last Chief: John Farquhar MacGillivray
- Died: 1942
- Commander: Iain Donald MacGillivray
Allied clans
Chattan Confederation
Clan Mackintosh
Clan MacPherson
Clan MacPhail
Clan MacBean
Clan Shaw of Tordarroch
Clan Farquharson
Clan MacThomas
Clan Davidson
Clan MacQueen
MacIntyres of Badenoch
the Macleans of Dochgarroch
Clan MacInnes
Rival clans
Clan Cameron

Clan MacGillivray is a Highland Scottish clan and is a member of the Clan Chattan Confederation. The clan does not currently have a clan chief, but following a petition to the Lord Lyon a family convention was held at Culloden on 15 April 2016. Submissions from four applicants for the role of commander were heard and Iain Donald MacGillivray was nominated and subsequently received his commission from the Lord Lyon. The role subsists for an initial period of five years but can be renewed for a further five years, and thereafter the commander can petition to be chief.

== History ==
=== Origins of the clan ===
The clan MacGillivray was an important clan even before the Norsemen were driven out of the Outer Hebrides by King Somerled, who was Lord of the Isles in the 12th century.

An ancient confederation is said to have existed between the Clans of MacInnes, MacGillivray, MacMaster and MacEachern. This confederation was known as the ‘Siol Gillebride’ (The seed or descendants of Gillebride). The Sleat historian Hugh MacDonald tells us that the principle surnames in Morvern were MacInnes and MacGillivray – “who are the same as the MacInneses.” James Logan the historian also says that the early MacGillivrays of Mull “seem to be otherwise called MacAonghais or MacInnes.”

In 1222, Alexander II of Scotland subdued Argyll, and the clan Mhic Gillebrath became dispersed. Some of the clan remained on the Isle of Mull, while others stayed in Morvern.

=== Joining the Chattan Confederation ===
There is a tradition that asserts that the chief of the clan placed himself under the protection of the chiefs of Clan Mackintosh, who were also chiefs of the Clan Chattan Confederation around 1268. Thereafter the clan MacGillivray became a protected member of the Confederation.

=== 16th to 17th centuries ===
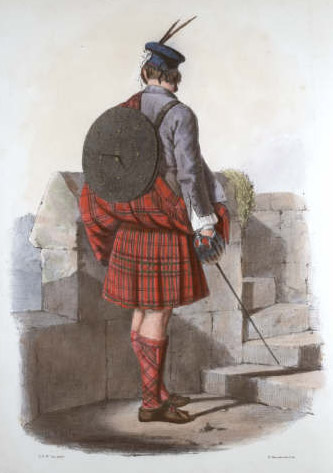
A romanticised Victorian-era illustration of a MacGillivray clansman by R. R. McIan from The Clans of the Scottish Highlands published in 1845.

The MacGillivray clan was first accurately recorded in Dunmaglass in 1549. In 1609, there was a great gathering of the Chattan Confederation, at which loyalties were given to the Mackintosh chief, and the haill kin and race of MacGillivray was represented by Malcolm MacGillivray of Dalcrombie and Duncan MacGillivray of Dunmaglass. The MacGillivrays were persecuted by their Calvinist and Presbyterian neighbors owing to their support of Episcopal polity of the church.

=== 18th century & Jacobite risings ===
Along with most of the other clans of the Chattan Confederation, the MacGillivrays were staunch Jacobites in both the Jacobite rising of 1715 and the Jacobite rising of 1745. During the 1745 rising, the chief of Mackintoshes and clan Chattan was however a serving officer in the Black Watch regiment of the British Army, but his wife, Lady Anne Mackintosh (née Farquharson), rallied the Chattan Confederation in support of the Jacobites and placed chief Alexander MacGillivray in command of the clan Chattan regiment. Alexander MacGillivray was killed leading his clan at the Battle of Culloden in 1746 along with many of his followers. A graveyard at Dunlichity commemorates the many MacGillivrays who fell in the battle. After Culloden, many MacGillivrays emigrated across the Atlantic, where many of them were successful, particularly as traders.

== Clan chief ==
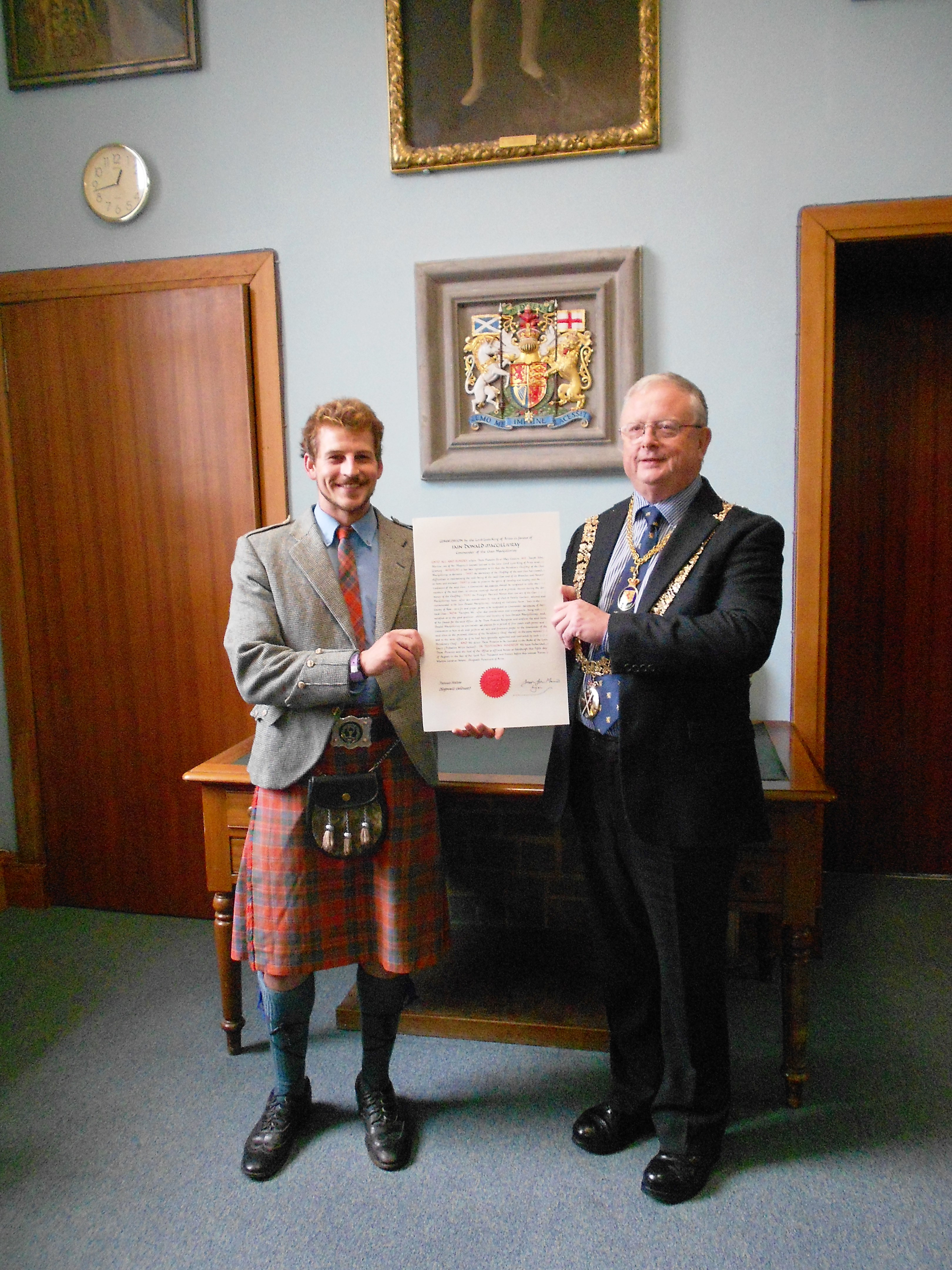
Iain MacGillivray receiving his commission as commander from the Lord Lyon Dr Joseph Morrow QC

- The last chief to live at Dunmaglass was the 13th laird, Capt. John William MacGillivray, who had to sell his estate and died without an heir in 1914.
- The chiefship then passed to a cousin of his, John Farquhar MacGillivray, who lived in Toronto, Ontario, Canada. John Farquhar MacGillivray was chief for 32 years when he died in 1942 without an heir, and the last chief of clan MacGillivray.
- A Dr Angus MacGillivary [d.1947] tried to claim the chieftainship but was unable to prove his lineage—although he was awarded a variation of the MacGillivray coat of arms in 1914.
- Another Canadian, Col. George B. MacGillivray, later petitioned Lord Lyon King of Arms three times between 1953 and 1989 to be recognised as chief. Lord Lyon, not satisfied with the proofs MacGillivray submitted, denied him status of chief, but commissioned him as commander of the clan. MacGillivray served as Commander for five years before dying in 1994, and to this day the clan remains without a Chief, but does once again have a Commander to lead it.
- In 2016, the Clan MacGillivray International Association organised a derbhfine or Family Convention with members of that Association and the clan MacGillivary Societies of America, Australia Canada and the Netherlands nominated Iain MacGillivray for the role of Clan Commander. The Lord Lyon accepted the nomination and presented him with his Commission, appointing and confirming him in this important leadership role for Clan MacGillivray.

== Clan castles ==
Dunmaglas, which is about six miles east of Inverfarigaig in Inverness-shire, was held by the MacGillivrays from at least the sixteenth century, if not earlier. Dalcrombie, which is nearby, was also held by the clan.

== Gathering places ==
- Clach An Airm in Strathnairn: Known gathering point of the MacGillivrays to organise and sharpen weapons.
- Carn Na Croiche: (Cairn of the Gallows) near Dunmaglass where criminals were hung
- The Dumnaglass Cairn: A heap of demolished homes after MacGillivrays were evicted around 1890.

== Associated names ==
Clan MacGillivray does not have any septs, though common variations of the names MacGillivray and McGillivray, associated with the clan, are listed as follows. Note that the prefix Mac/Mc are interchangeable, as well as the capitalisation of the second syllable.

- MacGillavery.
- MacGillavry.
- MacGillivary.
- MacGillivoor.
- MacGillivrey.
- MacGillivry.
- MacGillvary.
- MacGillveary.
- MacGillviray.
- MacGillivary.
- MacGillvrey.
- MacGilvary.
- MacGilveray.
- MacGilvery.
- MacGilvra.
- MacGilvray.
- MacGilvreay.
- MacGilvry.
- MacIlbra.
- MacIllevorie.
- MacIlvora.
- MacIlvoray.
- McGilvra.
- MacIlvrae.
- MacIlvray.
- McGilvray.
- McGilvrey.
- McGilvery.
- McGillivary.
- McGillivray.
- McGillivrae.
- McGilberry.
- Gilvary.

== Trivia ==
A playable character inspired by Scottish culture in the video game For Honor from the French publisher Ubisoft can be heard shouting "Dunmaghlas!", the historic war cry of the Clan. One of the character and story writers for the game was Ariadne MacGillivray, a member of the Clan.

There is a hill called Carn Na Croiche (Cairn of the Gallows) at Dunmaglass where the Chiefs of Clan MacGillivray hung criminals This typifies the absolute power that a clan chief of those times held over his people.

== See also ==
- Armigerous clan
- Chattan Confederation
- Scottish clan
- Lachlan McGillivray (1718–1799), the father of Alexander McGillivray
- William McGillivray (1764–1825)
- Carolina Henriette MacGillavry (1904–1993), member of the clan in the Netherlands
