= Battle of Harlaw =

1411 Scottish clan battle

Coordinates: 57°18′29″N 2°24′43″W

- Part of the feud between the Clan Donald and the Stewart royal family
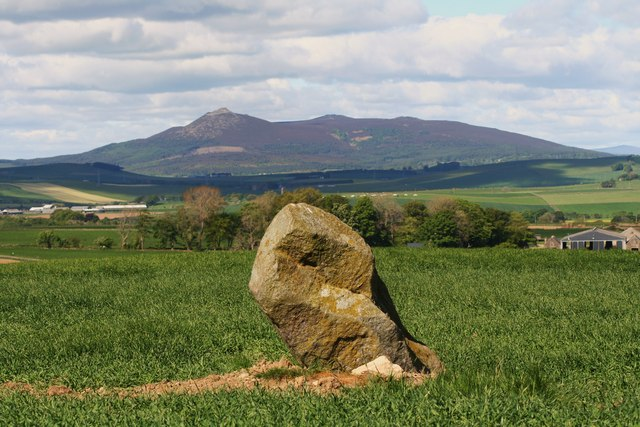
- Bennachie from the east; the battlefield is hidden by the fold of ground in the middle distance
Date	24 July 1411
Location	North of Inverurie, Scotland grid reference NJ75182422
Result	Tactical draw Both sides claim victory

Belligerents
Scottish Crown (Lowland clans loyal to the Duke of Albany)	Lordship of the Isles (Highland clans)

Commanders and leaders
Alexander Stewart, Earl of Mar; Robert Davidson, Provost of Aberdeen †; Sir James Scrymgeour, Constable of Dundee †; Sir Alexander Ogilvie, Sheriff of Angus †	Donald of Islay, Lord of the Isles; Hector MacLean †; Callum Beg Macintosh; John Mór Tanister

Strength
Several thousand	Fewer than 10,000

Casualties and losses
600 killed	900 killed

Registered battlefield
- Designated: 21 March 2011
- Reference no.: BTL11
- Location within Scotland

The Battle of Harlaw (Scottish Gaelic: Cath Gairbheach) was a Scottish clan battle fought on 24 July 1411 just north of Inverurie in Aberdeenshire. It was one of a series of battles fought during the Middle Ages between the barons of northeast Scotland and those from the west coast.

The battle was part of a series of battles fought to resolve competing claims to the Earldom of Ross, a large region of northern Scotland. Robert Stewart, Duke of Albany, Regent of Scotland, had taken control of the earldom ostensibly as guardian of his granddaughter Euphemia Leslie, but in truth, though Donald of Islay, Lord of the Isles, had the superior claim, Albany wanted Ross for his younger son, John. Donald, Lord of the Isles, had married Euphemia's aunt Mariota. Donald therefore invaded Ross with the intention of seizing the earldom by force and preventing Albany from taking all of Scotland.

The nearest contemporary record of the battle is found in the Irish Annals of Connacht, where under the year 1411, it is stated, "Mac Domnaill of Scotland won a great victory over the Galls of Scotland". The 2011 article by Iain G. MacDonald, "Donald of the Isles and the Earldom of Ross: West-Highland Perspectives on the Battle of Harlaw", also cites sources recording the victory.

== Background ==
During the Early Middle Ages, the territory of what later became Scotland was divided between the Gaelic kingdoms of Dál Riata on the western seaboard and Alba in the south-east, and Pictish kingdoms in the northeast of which Fortriu was the most important. Besides these there were the Anglo-Saxon Kingdom of Bernicia, later part of Northumbria, and the Brythonic Kingdom of Cumbria. Viking influence increased in the west, with the Norse-Gaels that became Lords of the Isles taking control of much of Dál Riata in 1156. The Gaels of Alba acquired Brythonic elements from the conquest of the Kingdom of Strathclyde in the 11th century and increasingly absorbed Norman-French and Anglo-Saxon culture, influences which also spread to the Pictish areas of the northeast. The lands of Fortriu became part of the Province of Moray, which was conquered by Alba in 1130 and fragmented into territories that were semi-independent of the king in Edinburgh.

There was a long history of conflicts between the Moray gentry and the clans of the West Coast, but some historians present Harlaw as a clash between the Scottish Highlands and Lowlands, or between Celt and Teuton. John Hill Burton (1809–1881) claimed that in Lowland Scotland Harlaw "was felt as a more memorable deliverance even than that of Bannockburn. What it was to be subject to England the country knew and disliked; to be subdued by their savage enemies of the mountains opened to them sources of terror of unknown character and extent". However Sir Robert Rait (1874–1936) detected no racial antipathy in the two contemporary accounts of the Scotichronicon and the Book of Pluscarden, and viewed Harlaw not as a conflict between races, but between two groups of Scots of which one spoke Scots and the other Gaelic. Rait mentions Buchanan's view that it was a raid for plunder.

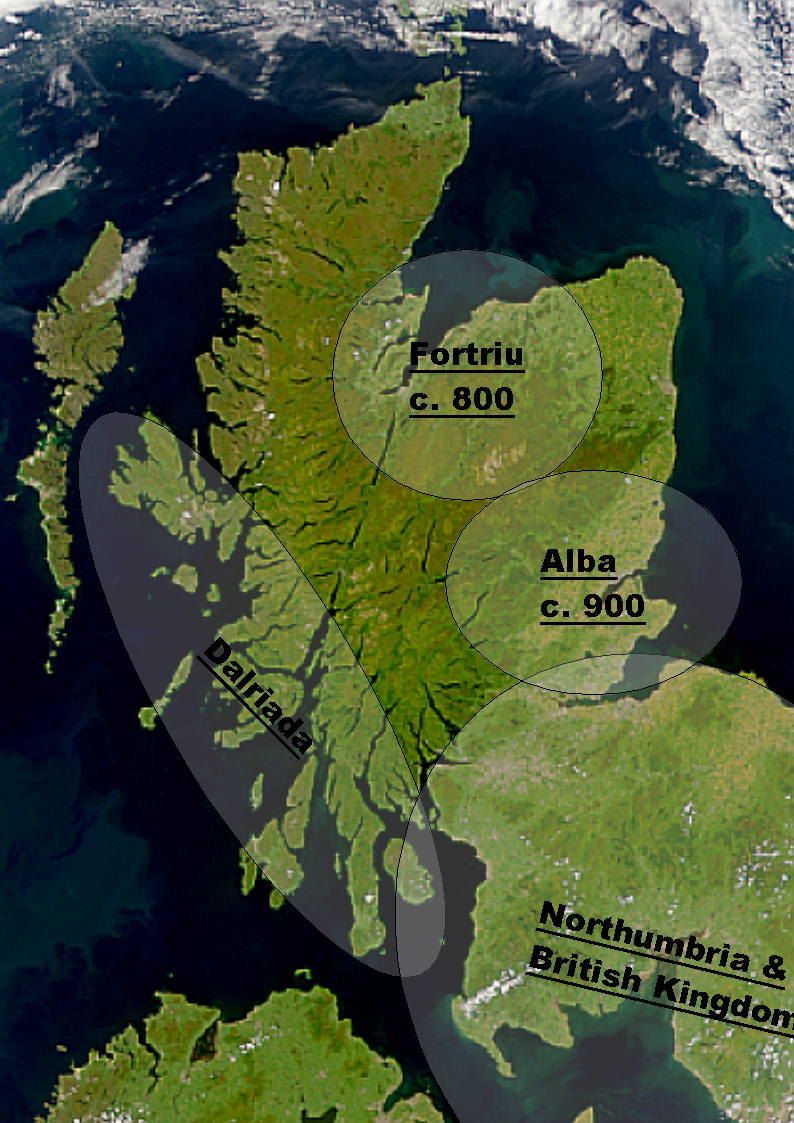
Map showing the approximate areas of the kingdom of Fortriu and neighbours c. 800, and the kingdom of Alba c. 900

== Claims on the Earldom of Ross ==
The Earldom of Ross was a vast territory reaching from Skye to Ross and Inverness-shire, with superiority over the outlying lands of Nairn and Aberdeenshire. In 1370 Uilleam (William), Earl of Ross received a charter from King David II, confirming his right to the title and directing that in the absence of male heirs, the entirety of the earldom, titles and lands would fall to "the elder daughter always" without division. Uilleam died in 1372 without a male heir, and the title passed to his daughter Euphemia. By her first husband Sir Walter Leslie, Euphemia had two children – Alexander Leslie and Mariota (anglicised as Margaret or Mary). After Walter's death, Euphemia married Alexander Stewart, Earl of Buchan (the "Wolf of Badenoch") in 1382, giving the Stewarts control of the earldom. However, in 1392 the Pope annulled the marriage and Ross was returned to Euphemia as Countess of Ross. The Wolf of Badenoch had long been living with his mistress Mairead inghean Eachainn with whom he had a number of children, including Alexander Stewart, Earl of Mar. Euphemia died in 1394 and her son Alexander Leslie inherited the title.

Robert Stewart, Duke of Albany had taken effective control of mainland Scotland towards the end of the reign of his father Robert II; his power increased during the reign (1390–1406) of his ineffective elder brother Robert III. Albany's daughter Isabel Stewart married Alexander Leslie before 1398 and their only child was a sickly daughter, also called Euphemia. According to the Calendar of Fearn, Leslie died on 8 May 1402, whilst his daughter was still a minor. Albany claimed wardship of Euphemia, and planned to take over Ross. After the capture by the English of Robert III's heir James and Robert's death soon afterwards in April 1406, Albany was confirmed as regent; Albany continued to govern Scotland until his death in September 1420.

Meanwhile, Donald (Domhnall), Lord of the Isles claimed the earldom of Ross through his marriage to Euphemia's aunt, Mariota, the oldest living female descendant of Uilleam. He also signed an alliance with Henry IV of England on 16 September 1405, which was renewed on 8 May 1408.

According to Skene, Euphemia became a nun before the battle.

== Invasion and the preceding Battle of Dingwall ==
It took Donald time to ready his assault, but in 1411 he assembled his forces at Ardtornish Castle on the Sound of Mull and invaded Ross. He met no opposition until "a severe conflict" at Dingwall, seat of the Earls of Ross, where, at the Battle of Dingwall, he fought a large body of men of the Clan Mackay from "Strathnaver". Their leader Angus Du Mackay, 7th of Strathnaver was captured and his brother Rory-Gald was killed along with "the greater part of his men"; Donald then captured and garrisoned Dingwall Castle. He imprisoned Mackay in a castle on the west coast and after the battle made peace with him, giving Angus his sister, Elizabeth, in marriage.

Donald assembled his army at Inverness, and summoned all the fighting men in Boyne and Enzie (northern Banffshire between the Rivers Deveron and Spey) to join his army. He then swept through Moray meeting little or no resistance. He then turned south-east, following roughly the route of the modern A96 road although the main road ran north of the River Urie, not south as it does today. Donald's men committed "great excesses" in Strathbogie and the Garioch, which belonged to Alexander Stewart, Earl of Mar. Finally the Islesmen and their Highlander allies came to Bennachie, the last hill of the Grampians before the coastal plain between Inverurie and Aberdeen. Donald was now within 20 miles (32 km) of Aberdeen burgh. On 23 July 1411, he set up camp just north of Inverurie, on high ground 2 km northwest of the bridge over the River Urie.

The Earl of Mar, who had made a pact with Albany to lead an army for him, had plenty of warning of their advance, and had assembled a force from among the gentry of Buchan, Angus and the Mearns (Kincardineshire). The Irvings, Maules, Moray, Straitons, Lesleys, Stirlings and Lovels were led by their respective clan chiefs. Mar gathered his troops at Inverurie, a strategic town on the Inverness-Aberdeen road, and on the morning of 24 July marched northwest to meet Donald.

== Battle ==
According to the Scotichronicon, the two armies joined battle on the eve of the feast of St James – 24 July 1411. The same source and many others put Donald's army at 10,000 Islanders, Highland clans with marriage bloodlines as well as men of Ross, They were armed with swords, bows and axes, short knives, and round targe shields.

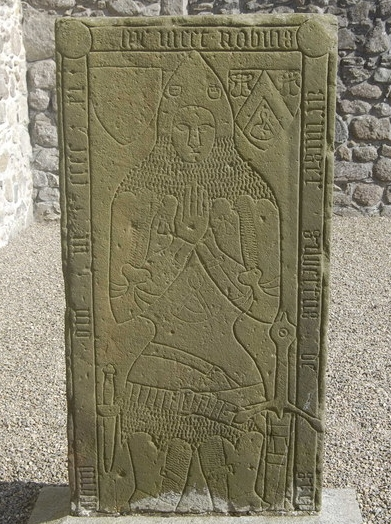
Tombstone of Gilbert de Greenlaw in Kinkell Church

Tradition has it that they faced a force numbering between 1,000 and 2,000 men; with significant numbers of knights. As an example, one Sir Gilbert de Greenlaw died at Harlaw and his tombstone at Kinkell Church gives an idea of how Mar's knights were equipped. Sir Gilbert carried a hand and a half sword and wore an open-faced bascinet helmet with a mail-reinforced arming doublet beneath plate armour. Mar's men also carried spears, maces, and battle axes. Tradition has it that the black armour in the entrance hall of Aberdeen Town House belonged to Robert Davidson, Provost of Aberdeen, who died in the battle along with most of the city's burgesses.

On spotting the Islesmen and their Highlander allies, Mar organised his force into battle array, with the main army behind a small advance guard of men-at-arms under Sir James Scrymgeour (Constable of Dundee, the hereditary standard-bearer of Scotland) and Sir Alexander Ogilvie of Auchterhouse (Sheriff of Angus). He probably split the army into three, with the knights as a cavalry reserve (some say they led the battle) and the infantry arranged in schiltrons, close-packed arrays of spearmen. There is no mention of significant numbers of archers. The Islanders and their Highlander allies were arranged in the traditional cuneiform or wedge shape, with Hector MacLean commanding the right wing and Callum Beg Macintosh, chief of the Clan Mackintosh and the confederation of Clan Chattan, on the left. Donald, Lord of the Isles commanded the centre of the army himself, backed by the MacLeods of Harris and MacLeods of Lewis, and his younger brother, John Mór Tanister, commanded the reserve, backed by the Mackenzies and Camerons. At first, the clansmen launched themselves at Scrymgeour's men, but failed to make much impression on the armoured column and many were slain. However, every wave that was repulsed, was replaced by fresh men. Mar led his knights into the main body of Donald's army and became cut off. They brought down the knights' warhorses and then used their dirks to finish off the riders.

By nightfall, the ballads claim that 600 of Mar's men were dead, including Ogilvie and his son, Scrymgeour, Sir Robert Maule, Sir Thomas Morrow (Murray), William Abernethy, Alexander Straiton of Lauriston, James Lovel, Alexander Stirling, and Sir Alexander Irvine of Drum; according to Maclean history the latter duelled with Hector Maclean until both were dead. Many families lost every male in their house; Lesley of Balquhain died with six of his sons.

Donald lost 900 men, a much smaller proportion of his total force (he still had 9100 men on the field), but including one of his commanders (Hector Maclean). In the history of the Mackintoshes, chiefs of the Chattan Federation, it is recorded that Mackintosh mourned the loss of so many of his friends and people, especially of Clan Vean (Clan MacBean). By contrast, a MacDonald Seanchaí stated that just "two or three gentlemen of the name Munroe" were killed in the battle and that they were part of the Lord of the Isles' host. The same 17th century manuscript states that the "son of Macquarry of Ulva" and "two gentlemen of the name Cameron" were also killed on the side of Donald, Lord of the Isles.

Wounded and too feeble to retreat, Mar and his surviving men camped on the battlefield, expecting combat to resume in the morning. At dawn they found that Donald had withdrawn during the night, going first to Ross and then back to the Isles. Donald clearly had the victory but decided not to press further. The McKean Historical Notes relating to the MacIain MacDonalds of Ardnamurchan, compiled by Fred G. McKean, 1906, at p. 38, refers to the Annals of the Old Abbey of Inis-Macreen and mentions the "great victory" of the Macdonald of Scotland in 1411.

== Aftermath ==
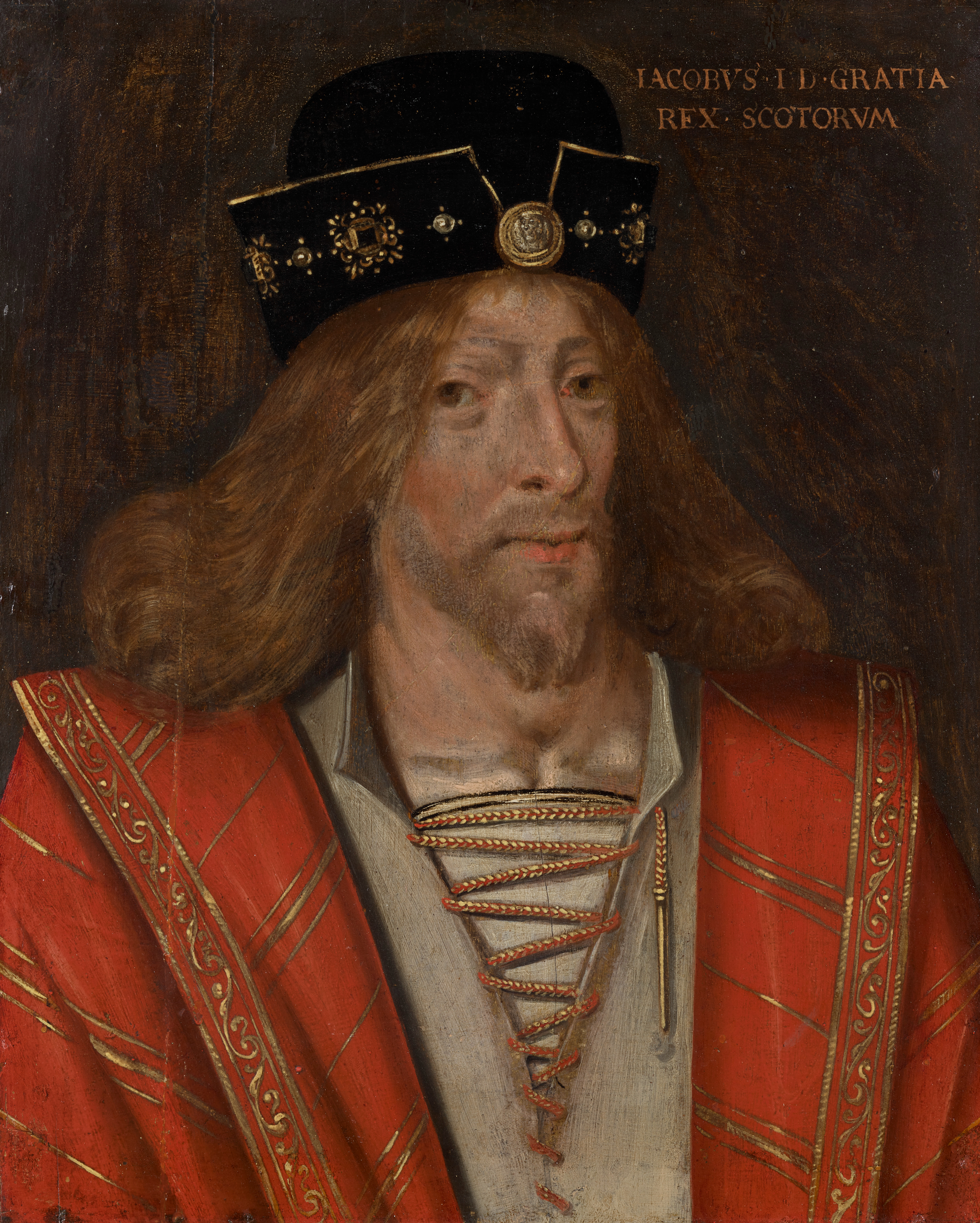
James I

Many of those who died were buried at Kinkell Church south of Inverurie. The heirs of the slain Scots were exempt from death duties in the same way as heirs of those who died fighting the English.

Suspecting that Donald had merely fallen back to rest and reinforce his troops, Albany collected an army and marched on Dingwall, seizing the castle and regaining control of Ross. In mid-1412 he followed up with a three-pronged attack on Donald's possessions, forcing Donald to surrender his claim on Ross, become a vassal of the Scottish crown and give up hostages against his future good behaviour. The treaty was signed at Polgilbe/Polgillip (Loch Gilp), an inlet of Loch Fyne in Argyll.

After Harlaw, the Earl of Mar "ruled with acceptance nearly all the north of the country beyond the Mounth" according to the Scotichronicon. He entered into an "uneasy alliance" with his uncle Albany, but the ruin of Albany's heirs left Mar in control of the north.

It was proposed on 3 June 1415 that Euphemia should marry Thomas Dunbar, 3rd (6th) Earl of Moray but the papal commission would not have arrived before she surrendered her land and titles (possibly under compulsion) to Albany's son the Earl of Buchan on 12 June 1415, after which she appears to have entered a nunnery. Buchan was killed at the Battle of Verneuil in 1424. In 1424, when James I returned to Scotland from his imprisonment in England, he had all of Albany's heirs, the Albany Stewarts, executed. Mariota claimed the earldom of Ross and the Lordship of the Isles once more, and James I awarded it to her in 1424. The title remained with the family for much of the 15th century. Donald's son Alexander succeeded to the title upon Mariota's death in 1429. He attempted an invasion of Ross in 1429 which led to his defeat and capture by Mar at the Battle of Lochaber.

In turn Mar suffered a devastating defeat at the hands of Donald's nephew Donald Balloch, at the Battle of Inverlochy. The resulting power vacuum allowed Alexander to occupy Inverness and perhaps consider himself Earl of Ross by 1437; the title was officially confirmed by the new regent, the Earl of Douglas, after the death of James I that year.

== Commemoration and archaeology ==
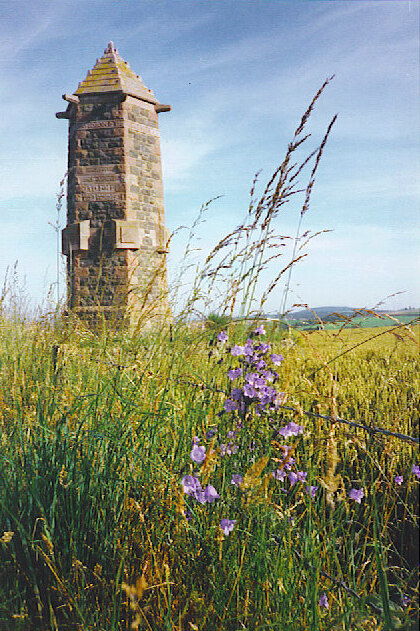
Harlaw Monument

The battle is remembered as "one of the hardest fought that ever took place on Scottish soil"; the fighting was so fierce that the battle went down in history as "Red (Reid) Harlaw". The battle is commemorated in a march, The Battle of Harlaw, and in ballads such as Child ballad 163. Maidment has a different ballad which apparently shares the same tune, but he is sceptical of its antiquity. Sir Walter Scott mentions Harlaw in his 1816 novel The Antiquary, particularly in Elspeth's ballad in Chapter 40.

Tradition has it that Mar founded Chapel of Garioch after the battle, to celebrate masses for the souls of the fallen. In 1911, Aberdeen Town Council erected the Harlaw Monument, located to the north of the town of Inverurie, to the memory of Provost Robert Davidson and the burgesses of Aberdeen who died in the battle. Designed by William Kelly and located to the south of Harlaw House, the granite monument is hexagonal and 40 feet (12.2 m) tall. There were once several cairns in the area that were traditionally associated with the battle, but little remains of them now – Drum's Cairn, Provost Davidson's Cairn, Donald's Tomb and the Liggars Stane. Twelve human skeletons were uncovered northeast of Harlaw House in 1837. Although there have been several discoveries of prehistoric artefacts, such as stone axeheads and a flint core, no artefacts directly attributable to the battle have been recorded. The battlefield has been inventoried and protected by Historic Scotland under the Historic Environment (Amendment) Act 2011.

== See also ==
- Battle of Lochaber – the final battle of a similar invasion by Donald's son in 1429
- History of Scotland
- Lord of the Isles
- Bonnie Rideout's album Harlaw, Scotland 1411 features music and commentary related to the Battle or Harlaw.

== Bibliography ==
- Keay, John; Keay, Julia (1994), Collins Encyclopaedia of Scotland, HarperCollins, ISBN 978-0-00-255082-6
- Lynch, Michael (1992), Scotland: A New History, Pimlico, ISBN 0-7126-9893-0
- Rait, Robert S. (1901), An Outline of the Relations Between England and Scotland (500–1707), London: Blackie & Son – available online as the at Google Books (2007 Echo Library reprint and others), a Gutenberg e-book at Scribd and a poorly OCR'd text file at archive.org. Appendix A (pp. 108–12 of the Echo version) helpfully collects together the descriptions of the battle (in Latin) from Walter Bower (Scotichronicon Lib. xv, ch xxi), the Book of Pluscarden (Liber Pluscardensis Bk. x, ch. xxii), John Major/Mair (Historia Majoris Britanniae Bk. vi, ch. x), Hector Boece (Scotorum Historiae Lib. xvi) and George Buchanan (Rerum Scoticarum Historia Lib. x).
- Roberts, John Leonard (1999), Feuds, Forays and Rebellions: History of the Highland Clans, 1475–1625, Edinburgh University Press, ISBN 978-0-7486-6244-9
- Tranter, Nigel (1977), The Captive Crown (1st ed.), Hodder & Stoughton, ISBN 978-1-4447-6814-5
- Tytler, Patrick Fraser (1845), History of Scotland: 1149–1603 (3rd ed.), W. Tait
- Williams, Ronald (1997) [1984 (Chatto & Windus)], The Lords of the Isles: The Clan Donald and the Early Kingdom of the Scots (Reprint ed.), Isle of Colonsay, UK: House of Lochar, ISBN 978-1-899863-17-4
