= Third regency of Robert Stewart, Duke of Albany =

Robert Stewart, Duke of Albany (1339–1420) was a younger son of Robert II of Scotland who as regent was de facto ruler of Scotland for several years during the reigns of Robert II, Robert III and James I. His third and longest period as regent was from 1402 until his death in 1420.

== Start of third regency ==
He had experienced some ups and downs, including two earlier periods as regent, but his position became threatened during the reign of King Robert III of Scotland by the rise of the king's son, David, Duke of Rothesay.

The Duke of Rothesay died in Robert Duke of Albany's custody at Falkland Palace on 25 or 27 March 1402. Although it was claimed that David died of dysentery, most contemporaries believed that Robert had ordered his nephew David to be starved to death. Robert probably faced formal accusations of murdering his nephew during a general council, called to discuss David's death, which met in Edinburgh in May 1402. Archibald, 4th Earl of Douglas, was also viewed with suspicion for his role in David's death. Despite these tensions, Robert was able to dominate the proceedings of the council. Robert arrived in Edinburgh with a large number of his affinity, while Edinburgh Castle was already controlled and garrisoned by his ally, the Earl of Douglas. Robert forced his eldest brother, Robert III, to pardon him for David's death by declaring that David had died of natural causes. At the conclusion of the council, Robert was appointed as regent of Scotland for a period of two years.

Robert's victory over his nephew made him the most powerful man in Scotland. After becoming regent in May 1402, Robert gained effective control of the Scottish royal court. By the autumn of 1402, Robert's eldest brother, the king, was surrounded on a daily basis by members of Robert's affinity, who were led by Robert's younger half-brother, Walter, Earl of Caithness. These men seem to have ensured that the king remained within the Stewart family's ancestral lands in southwestern Scotland. Robert may even have relied on Walter to physically detain their eldest brother, keeping Robert III under informal arrest.

== Homildon campaign (1402) ==
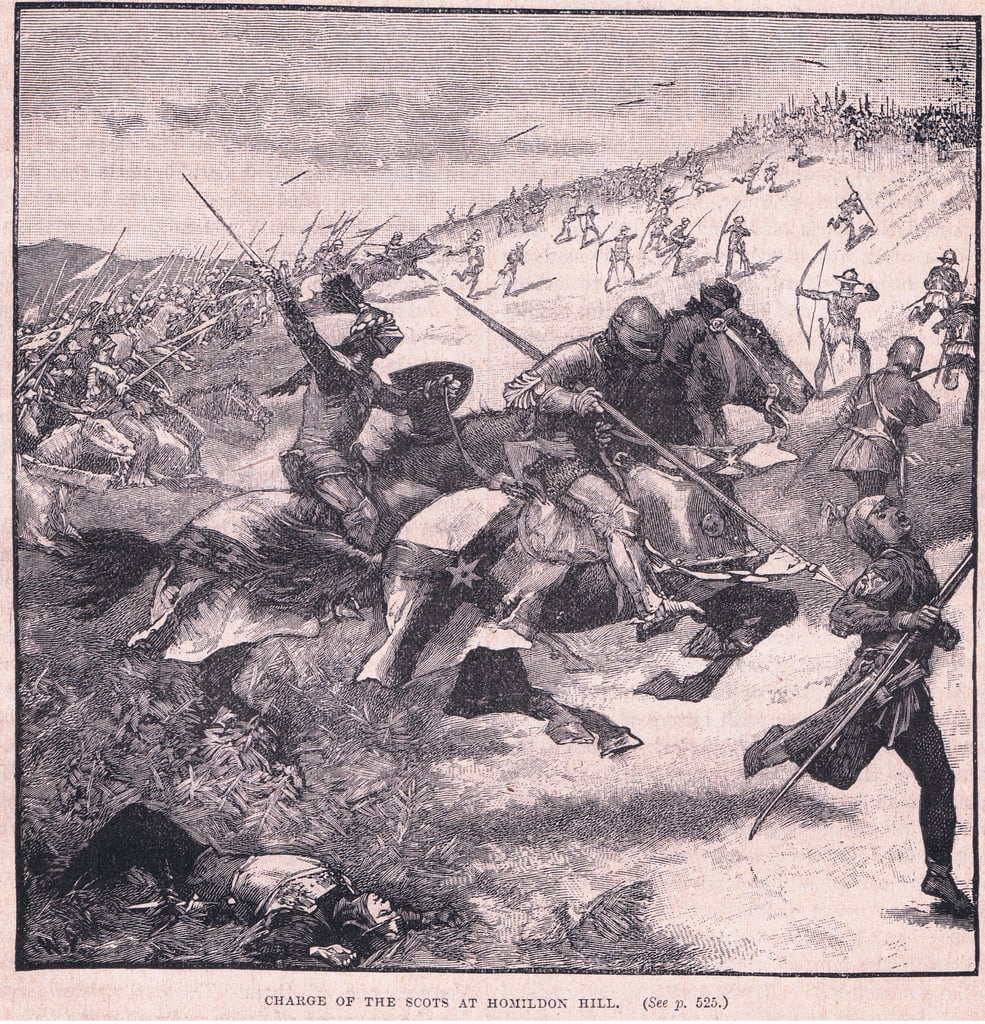
A Scottish cavalry force charges against English archers at the Battle of Homildon Hill in 1402. This Scottish defeat was a major event of Robert's third regency.

The beginning of Robert's third regency was accompanied by renewed conflict between Scotland and England. Henry IV of England, who had already invaded Scotland, faced serious challenges to his rule by 1402, including the rebellion of Owain Glyndŵr in Wales. Around this time, Thomas Warde, an impostor claiming to be Richard II, the deposed King of England, first appeared in Scottish records. Robert paid Warde an annual pension to sustain a court and entourage at Stirling Castle. After arresting his nephew at the end of 1401, Robert sent David Lindsay, 1st Earl of Crawford, to explain to the advisors of Charles VI of France that Richard II was still alive and living in Scotland. Although the French were not convinced by Robert's claims, Henry IV viewed the impostor as a dynastic threat.

Robert's promotion of Warde as a challenger to Henry IV was probably influenced by his ally, Archibald, 4th Earl of Douglas, to whom he had promised control of Anglo-Scottish policy at Culross. The earl's hostility towards England was driven by his feud with the exiled George Dunbar, Earl of March, who had taken refuge in northern England. During the summer of 1402, the Earl of Douglas supervised two Scottish attacks on northern England. The second attack met with disaster, as the Scottish army was destroyed by George, Earl of March, and his English forces at the Battle of Nesbit Moor. After this defeat, Douglas asked Robert to support a retaliatory Scottish campaign against England. Robert agreed to support the earl's war effort, and his affinity probably formed the core of the Scottish army that invaded England in September 1402.

This new Scottish invasion culminated at the Battle of Homildon Hill, fought in Northumberland on 14 September 1402. Robert's eldest son, Murdoch, led the Scottish army alongside the Earl of Douglas. The battle resulted in a serious Scottish defeat. English troops captured both Murdoch and Douglas at the end of the battle. Various Scottish noblemen, including Thomas Dunbar, Earl of Moray, Henry Sinclair, Earl of Orkney, and George Douglas, Earl of Angus, were also captured, amidst the destruction of the Scottish army on the battlefield.

== Cocklaws and renewed war ==
The Scottish defeat at Homildon Hill left southern Scotland open to English attack. Henry IV of England used his army's victory as leverage in his campaign to be recognized as the feudal overlord of Scotland. Early in 1403, Henry IV made a symbolic grant of the earldom of Douglas to Henry Percy, Earl of Northumberland. This grant provided the pretext for Percy's son, Harry Hotspur, to invade Scotland with a large army in May 1403. Hotspur besieged the tower house of Cocklaws, near Ormiston. After receiving news of the siege, Robert convened a general council at Falkland Palace to debate the Scottish response. According to Walter Bower, Robert delivered an impassioned speech in favor of relieving the garrison of Cocklaws. Robert led a Scottish army south to confront Hotspur in July 1403, recapturing Innerwick Castle during the short campaign. A potential battle between Scottish and English forces was averted when Hotspur, who had briefly joined his father's rebellion against Henry IV, was defeated and killed by the English king at the Battle of Shrewsbury on 21 July. The collapse of the English campaign of 1403 bolstered Robert's public image as a defender of Scotland on the battlefield.

Despite the apparent Scottish victory in 1403, intermittent conflict between the two kingdoms continued for several years. Robert was reluctant to engage in open war against England, due to the captivity of his eldest son, Murdoch, at the court of Henry IV. During a general council in August 1404, Robert ordered an embassy to travel to England to negotiate for the release of Murdoch and his fellow captive, Archibald, Earl of Douglas. These negotiations were ultimately rendered futile when a new Anglo-Scottish war erupted in 1405, coincidental with the major rebellion of Richard Scrope, Archbishop of York, against Henry IV. James Douglas of Balvenie, the brother of the imprisoned Earl of Douglas, led a Scottish army to plunder the city of Berwick-upon-Tweed, while Scottish and English naval forces clashed in the Irish Sea.

== Dynastic and national politics ==
Robert was reappointed as regent by a general council in April 1404, receiving a commission to govern Scotland for another two years. Robert's reappointment signaled his continued political dominance of Scotland, but his eldest brother, Robert III, began to reemerge onto the political scene around this time. The king, who had been relegated to obscurity since the death of his son in 1402, began to challenge Robert's power as regent with his remaining personal authority. Robert III's renewed presence in Scottish politics after 1404 probably stemmed from the influence of three men - Henry Sinclair, Earl of Orkney, Henry Wardlaw, Bishop of St. Andrews, and David Fleming of Biggar - who had become established as a triumvirate of royal favorites.

Robert's relationship with Wardlaw was particularly complicated. After securing the regency in 1402, Robert settled previous disputes over the diocese of St. Andrews by forcing his illegitimate half-brother, Thomas Stewart, to resign his claims to the bishopric in favor of Walter Danielston, the former keeper of Dumbarton Castle. Wardlaw was elected to succeed Danielston as bishop after the latter died before he could be consecrated. Robert likely viewed Wardlaw with animosity, which encouraged the bishop to support the king's return to power. Robert's interests in northern Scotland also set the stage for political conflict with his eldest brother. After the death of his ally, Euphemia, Countess of Ross, in c. 1396, Robert had secured the marriage of his daughter, Isabella, to Alexander Leslie, Euphemia's son and heir. Alexander's unexpected death in 1402 left Robert's young granddaughter, Euphemia Leslie, as suo jure Countess of Ross. Robert was probably forced to lead military forces to secure his granddaughter's claim on the earldom. Robert had gained substantial personal control over Ross by 1405.

Tensions between Robert and his resurgent eldest brother were also inflamed by the political situation in the earldom of Mar. After the death in 1402 of Malcolm Drummond, lord of Mar through his marriage to Isabel Douglas, Countess of Mar, Robert moved to gain physical control of the earldom. Robert likely sought to lay the groundwork for his political allies, the Erskine family, to be recognized as earls of Mar. The widowed countess initially supported Robert's dominance of Mar, but in August 1404 she signed a marriage contract with Alexander Stewart, Robert's illegitimate nephew. Robert was unable to prevent Isabella's wedding to Alexander, which took place at Kildrummy Castle on 9 December 1404. Alexander secured royal confirmation of his marriage in January 1405, signaling the king's own opposition to Robert's wishes. Robert III's support for the Scottish attack on Berwick in 1405, which jeopardized negotiations for the release of his nephew, Murdoch, was a sign that effective control of the Scottish government had been returned to the king and his triumvirate of favorites. The king's independent control of foreign policy was demonstrated when he allowed Henry Percy, the young grandson of the rebellious Earl of Northumberland, to take refuge in Scotland during 1405.

== Final ascent to power (1406) ==
Despite his recovery of political power, Robert III had become severely ill by late 1405. Later historians, including Walter Bower, claimed that the king decided to send his only surviving son, James, to France around this time. This decision was allegedly driven by fears that Robert, who had already killed his eldest nephew, also sought to arrange James' death in order to succeed his eldest brother as king. James fled Scotland early in 1406, his party pursued and attacked by Albany's allies.

Robert's political allies, the Douglas family, provoked the collapse of Robert III's triumvirate in February 1406. David Fleming of Biggar, the king's favorite knight, led a royal army into East Lothian to confront James Douglas of Balvenie, his local political rival and the brother of Archibald, 4th Earl of Douglas. Walter Bower described Fleming's campaign in East Lothian as a "provocation" against the Douglas family, while Thomas Walsingham, the contemporary English historian, believed that it represented open civil war in Scotland. Fleming brought Prince James on campaign as the figurehead of his army. Having raised his own army, Balvenie defeated and killed Fleming at Herdmanston on 14 February. James fled for safety, first to North Berwick, and then to the Bass Rock, where he remained under the care of the Earl of Orkney, another of the king's favorites. At this crucial moment, Robert's presumed hostility towards his nephew may have convinced James' advisors not to attempt his return to the Scottish mainland. A ship was instead chartered to bring James to safety in France. This desperate measure backfired when the ship was captured near Flamborough Head by English pirates. James was taken as a prisoner to the court of Henry IV.

Robert III died on 4 April 1406, shortly after hearing the news of his son's capture. With the death of his eldest brother, and the capture of his nephew, Robert was once again the most powerful man in the Stewart dynasty.

== Governor of Scotland (1406-1420) ==
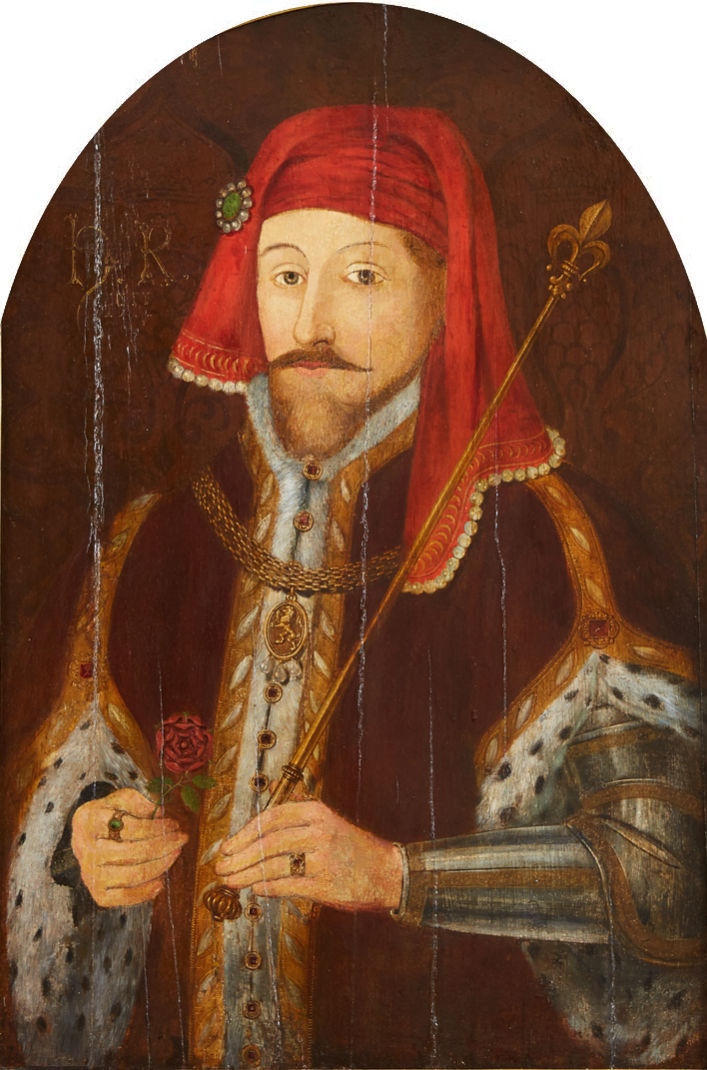
Henry IV of England, with whom Robert had a difficult relationship as governor.

Robert's nephew, James I, became King of Scots after the death of Robert's eldest brother in April 1406. James' captivity in England, however, forced the Scottish estates to recognize Robert's power as regent once again. Robert was reappointed as regent by a general council in July 1406. Unlike on previous occasions, Robert adopted the title of "Governor" in 1406. Andrew of Wyntoun, the contemporary Scottish historian, believed that Robert's appointment as governor in 1406 represented a continuation of his previous powers as lieutenant or guardian. Despite this claim, Robert began to adopt many royal privileges after 1406, marking a departure from his previous periods as regent. By 1410, Robert was using the style of Dei Gratia, traditionally reserved for kings, in diplomatic correspondence. For several years after becoming governor, Robert maintained the legal position that his nephew was merely the heir to the vacant Scottish monarchy, as he had never been crowned. Robert was clearly aware that he might succeed James as king if the latter died in captivity, and referenced the possibility in a legal document of 1409.

== Conflict and diplomacy ==
Robert's main concern after becoming governor was the course of Anglo-Scottish relations. He sought to resume negotiations with Henry IV in December 1406, sending a large embassy to meet with the English king in London. Despite this diplomacy, and the captivity of his eldest son, Murdoch, in England, Robert's relationship with Henry IV was ambivalent. Robert seemingly reversed course in 1407 by allowing the exiled Earl of Northumberland, a rebel against Henry IV, to seek refuge in Scotland. The earl gathered an army and attacked northern England in February 1408, but was killed by Henry IV's forces. The liberation of Archibald, Earl of Douglas, from English captivity formed the backdrop to these events. Douglas, who had been released on parole by Henry IV in 1407, initially swore to remain loyal to the English king, but quickly broke this oath. When his parole expired early in 1409, Douglas failed to return to England.

Douglas' arrival in Scotland was the prelude to the campaign of May 1409, during which a Scottish army attacked and captured Jedburgh Castle. Robert ordered Jedburgh, a symbol of the English occupation of southern Scotland since the Wars of Scottish Independence, to be destroyed after it fell into Scottish hands. Renewed naval conflict between Scotland and England erupted in the same year, when an English fleet led by Robert Umfraville attacked the Firth of Forth. Henry IV opened negotiations with Robert in April 1410, seeking to exchange Douglas for Robert's eldest son. These negotiations ultimately proved futile, as Douglas paid a large ransom to Henry IV to secure his freedom.

== Domestic affairs ==
After becoming governor, Robert sought to increase his control over the principality of Scotland, a collection of lands that had been set aside as a personal appanage for his nephew, James I, in 1404. Robert was opposed by the Kennedy family, the predominant landowners in the region, whose head, James Kennedy, was married to Princess Mary, Robert's niece and the captive king's elder sister. Tensions between Robert and the Kennedy family in Carrick became inflamed. James Kennedy was murdered in 1408, probably on Robert's orders, after several years of local violence. Robert also faced dissent against his rule in Ayrshire, where prominent residents supported James' claim to the principality.

The major political event of Robert's first years as governor was the return of George Dunbar, Earl of March, from exile in England. The Earl of March, who had previously sought English support against Robert's late nephew, David, Duke of Rothesay, abandoned Henry IV in June 1408 and traveled back to Scotland. Robert accepted the Dunbar family's pledges of loyalty, and began attempting to reconcile Dunbar with his old enemy, the Earl of Douglas. Robert's support of Dunbar's return provoked a dispute with Douglas, which he sought to resolve by meeting the earl at Inverkeithing in June 1409. Renewed political discussions led to a final meeting between Robert, Douglas, and Dunbar at Haddington in October 1409. During this meeting, which took place in a public forum, Robert supervised an exchange of land between Douglas and Dunbar as a mark of peace between the two noblemen. Robert arranged the marriage of his eldest son by his second marriage, John, Earl of Buchan, to Douglas' daughter Elizabeth in 1410, in a final sign of his rapprochement with the earl.

After 1410, Robert largely left the governance of southern Scotland in the hands of Archibald, 4th Earl of Douglas, the most powerful non-royal nobleman in the kingdom. Although he rebuked Douglas that same year for taking funds illegally from the Scottish exchequer, Robert allowed significant grants to be made to the earl for the remainder of his rule. Douglas effectively robbed Robert's regency government of large sums of money, and began abusing the customs revenue of Edinburgh to supply his personal income. The nadir of this difficult period for the royal finances came in 1418, when Douglas besieged Edinburgh Castle in order to arrest members of his own affinity who worked in the exchequer. Robert was unwilling to challenge the Douglas family or its strong affinity, and restricted his interference in southern Scotland to confirming the earl's charters with the Great Seal.

== War in the north (1411) ==
In order to provide security and political stability in northern Scotland, Robert increasingly turned to Alexander, Earl of Mar, his illegitimate nephew, after 1404. The Earl of Mar had emerged as a respected member of the nobility by 1411, and was particularly famous for his chivalric activities in England. Robert relied on Mar's power in northeastern Scotland to defend against Donald MacDonald, Lord of the Isles, another of his nephews. Donald, who had already ordered an attack on Elgin in 1402, opposed Robert's rule of the earldom of Ross, which Robert claimed on behalf of his granddaughter, Euphemia Leslie, Countess of Ross. Donald's claim to Ross was strengthened by his marriage to Mariota Leslie, Euphemia's aunt, who had a better claim to the earldom by proximity of blood. Robert further angered Donald when, shortly after becoming governor in 1406, he forced Euphemia to abandon her claim to the earldom of Buchan in favor of her uncle, John, Robert's eldest son by his second marriage. Donald likely feared that Robert would also force his granddaughter to resign Ross to his son, thereby permanently blocking Donald's claim to the earldom. In turn, Robert felt threatened by Donald's negotiations with Henry IV of England in 1408, when several English ambassadors traveled to the Outer Hebrides to seek an alliance with the Lord of the Isles.

A depiction of the Battle of Harlaw in 1411, one of the most notable events of Robert's rule.

The growing dispute between Robert and Donald culminated in open warfare early in 1411. Having assembled a large army of his vassals, Donald attacked and burned Inverness during the spring. Robert ordered Alexander, Earl of Mar, to raise forces to defend the earldom of Ross from Donald's army. Mar gathered an army of the men of Aberdeen, who feared that their city would become the next target of Donald's warriors, along with contingents of knights from Mar and Angus. The resulting battle, fought near Inverurie in the Garioch on 24 July 1411, ended in a tactical stalemate. Both sides claimed victory, while over a thousand common soldiers and various commanders in both armies were killed. News of the inconclusive battle prompted Robert to march north with his own army in the autumn of 1411. Robert recaptured Dingwall Castle, expelling Donald's garrison, while the lord fled back to the Hebrides.

=== Aftermath of Harlaw ===
Although the lordship of the Isles had suffered severe losses during the campaign of 1411, Donald was determined to renew his war for Ross the following year. In response to threats from the north, Robert organized three new armies during the summer of 1412. After bringing these considerable forces towards the northwest, Robert confronted Donald at Lochgilphead and forced him to submit to his authority. According to Walter Bower, Robert forced Donald to surrender hostages in exchange for his freedom. Robert's victory in 1412 secured his dominance in Ross, although Donald did not abandon his claims to the earldom. Robert felt confident enough in his hold over Ross to force his granddaughter, Euphemia, to resign the earldom in 1415, after which she entered a convent. Robert granted the earldom to his son, John, Earl of Buchan, before 1417, as Donald had allegedly feared.

== Western Schism ==
Robert's period as governor was dominated by the Western Schism, a thirty-nine-year dispute over the legitimate occupant of the Roman Catholic papacy. At the beginning of the Schism in 1378, Robert's father, Robert II, had pledged Scotland's allegiance to Clement VII, who had been elected as an antipope in opposition to Urban VI, the legitimate Roman pope. In the following decades, Robert's father and eldest brother continued to support Clement VII and his successor, Benedict XIII, as heirs to the Avignon Papacy, while the kings of England supported the Roman papacy. After becoming governor in 1406, Robert maintained the Stewart dynasty's traditional loyalty to the Avignon antipope. By 1409, however, Benedict XIII was becoming increasingly isolated. France withdrew its support for the antipope, while the Council of Pisa attempted to end the Schism by electing a third papal claimant, Alexander V. After 1409, Robert was one of very few European rulers, along with King Martin of Aragon, who continued to recognize Benedict XIII as the legitimate pope.

Benedict XIII rewarded Robert's loyalty with extensive patronage. In 1413, the antipope granted a bull to the diocese of St Andrews that established the University of St Andrews, the first university in Scotland. In the following year, Benedict XIII allowed Robert to begin collecting income from church benefices. Robert's support for the antipope drew increasing controversy within Scotland. Many Scottish clergymen attended the Council of Constance, which began in 1414 in another attempt to resolve the Schism, against Robert's wishes.< Robert's obstinate loyalty to Benedict XIII contrasted with the position of his nephew, James I, who sent representatives to the council from his captivity in the Tower of London. Robert's position became untenable after the council formally deposed Benedict XIII in July 1417. The election of Martin V in November 1417, officially ending the Schism, put further pressure on Robert. The ecclesiastical faculty of the University of St Andrews abandoned their support for Benedict XIII en masse, intending to "induce the governor" to declare his loyalty to Martin V.

Robert recognized the weakness of his position, and convened a general council at Perth in October 1418 to discuss the papal issue. Robert chose an English theologian, Robert Harding, to speak in his defense during an intellectual debate on the status of Benedict XIII. Harding attempted to deny the legitimacy of the Council of Constance, but was refuted by various clergymen who spoke in support of Martin V. The general council ultimately decided to recognize Martin V as the legitimate pope, in a political and moral defeat for Robert.

== Persecution of Lollards ==
Robert's religious policy was underpinned by his persecution of Lollards, members of a heretical Christian sect who followed the teachings of John Wycliffe, an English theologian. Andrew of Wyntoun, the contemporary historian, noted Robert's strong defense of Catholic orthodoxy. Robert supported the execution by burning in 1407 of John Resby, an English priest and follower of Wycliffe, which was conducted by religious authorities. In the following years, Lollard heresy in Scotland was accompanied by the beliefs of the Hussites, which were spread by Scotsmen with diplomatic or commercial contacts in Bohemia. There was widespread concern in Scotland about Lollard beliefs as late as 1417, when faculty at the University of St Andrews were made to swear an oath against members of the sect.

== Ransom and overseas war ==
After several years of relative peace, Anglo-Scottish relations deteriorated again following the accession of Henry V of England in March 1413. Robert's priority remained the safe release of his eldest son, Murdoch, who had now been held captive in England for over a decade. After becoming king in 1413, Henry V ordered Murdoch and his cousin, James I, to be transferred to a harsh confinement in the Tower of London. In contrast to his anxiety over his son, Robert showed little interest in the release of his nephew. James I complained in correspondence with Robert that nothing had been done to negotiate for his ransom from English captivity. Tentative negotiations for the king's return to Scotland, which were underway by the end of 1412, collapsed after Henry V's accession. Although Henry V was initially opposed to the release of his Scottish prisoners, his growing commitment to the Hundred Years' War with France forced him to negotiate with Robert. The English king agreed to ransom Murdoch into Scottish custody in 1415, in exchange for Robert's promise of neutrality in the conflict with France. Murdoch was kidnapped by a group of Lollards while journeying north to Scotland, and his ransom was cancelled following his recapture by English forces. Murdoch was finally released from captivity in February 1416, in exchange for a ransom of £10,000.

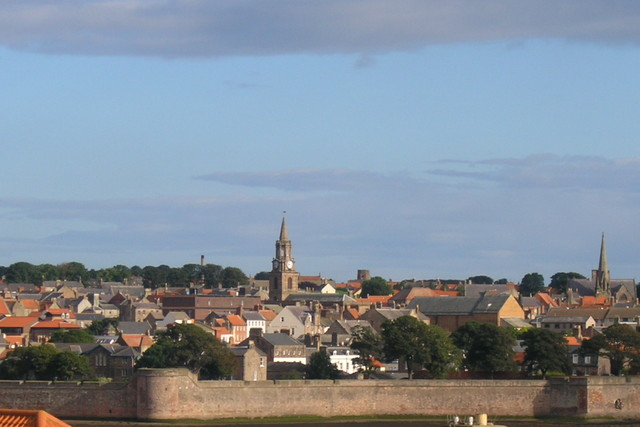
The town of Berwick-upon-Tweed, which Robert besieged in 1417 during his last military campaign.

Henry V's successful campaign against France, marked by the Battle of Agincourt in October 1415, provoked renewed aggression from Scotland, the traditional ally of France. Despite ongoing negotiations between Robert and Henry V, a Scottish army led by Archibald, 4th Earl of Douglas, attacked Penrith in 1415. Robert sanctioned a larger Scottish campaign in July 1417, after the release of his eldest son and Henry V's return to France. Robert led an army to assault the town of Berwick, while the Earl of Douglas attacked Roxburgh Castle with a second army. Robert besieged Berwick with primitive gunpowder artillery, but was unable to dislodge the English garrison. An English army led by John, Duke of Bedford, was quickly assembled to confront the Scots. Upon hearing news of Bedford's approach, Robert abandoned his siege of Berwick and retreated back across the Scottish border. The unsuccessful campaign of 1417 acquired the name of the "Foul Raid" within Scotland.

Despite the outcome of the Foul Raid, Robert continued to lend armed support to the Valois dynasty in its war with Henry V. Charles, Dauphin of France, sent ambassadors to Scotland in 1418 to meet with Robert. The general council of that year, which had met to discuss the Western Schism, agreed to raise and equip a Scottish expeditionary force to campaign in France. Robert appointed his second son, John, Earl of Buchan and Ross, to command the Scottish expedition alongside Archibald Douglas, Earl of Wigtown. After extensive preparations, an army of 6,000 men sailed from Scotland the following year, arriving at the port of La Rochelle in October 1419. Robert's support for the Dauphin formed another point of contention with his captive nephew, James I, who was now emerging as an honored figure at the English court. In order to demoralize the Scottish expedition, James I was taken to France early in 1420 as part of Henry V's army. The Scottish king lent his personal support to the Treaty of Troyes, which represented a severe defeat for the Valois cause, by attending Henry V's wedding to Catherine of Valois in June 1420.

== Death and succession ==
Robert appointed his eldest son, who had now assumed the courtesy title of Earl of Fife, as his "lieutenant" in 1417.

Robert died at Stirling Castle on 3 September 1420.

== Sources ==
- Boardman, Stephen (1996). The Early Stewart Kings: Robert II and Robert III, 1371-1406. Edinburgh: Tuckwell Press. ISBN 978 1 904607 68 7.
- Brown, Michael (1994). James I (First ed.). Canongate Press. ISBN 1-898410-40-2.
- Brown, Michael (1998). The Black Douglases: War and Lordship in Medieval Scotland (Second ed.). Tuckwell Press. ISBN 1-86232-036-5.
- Cannon, John; Cowcroft, Robert (2015). A Dictionary of British History (Third ed.). Oxford University Press. ISBN 9780191758027.
- Penman, Michael (2004). David II. East Linton: Tuckwell Press. ISBN 1 86232 2023.
- Penman, Michael (2006). The Kings and Queens of Scotland (Second ed.). Stroud, Gloucestershire, UK: The History Press. ISBN 978 0 7524 3814 6.
- Nicholson, Ranald (1974). Scotland: The Later Middle Ages (Second ed.). Edinburgh: Mercat Press. ISBN 0901824 844.
- Rose, Alexander (2003). Kings in the North: The House of Percy in British History. Phoenix Press. ISBN 9781842124857.
- Seward, Desmond (2014). The Demon's Brood: A History of the Plantagenet Dynasty. Pegasus Books. ISBN 978 1 60598 618 0.
- Thomson, Thomas; Annandale, Charles (2023). A History of the Scottish People from the Earliest Times - Volume 2 (Reprinted ed.). Legare Street Press.
