= Alexander of Islay, Earl of Ross =

Scottish nobleman

Alexander de Yle (Alasdair MacDomhnaill)
- Earl of Ross and Lord of the Isles
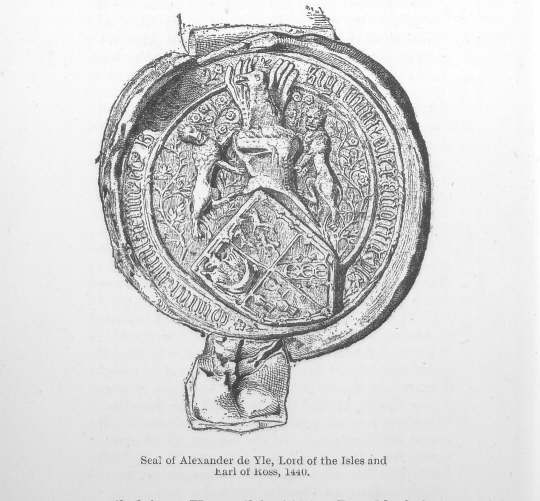
- The seal of Alexander. It includes his arms, which contains the arms of the Lordship of the Isles and the Earldom of Ross, surrounded by a royal tressure, indicating Alexander's royal blood as the grandson of King Robert II of Scotland.
- Reign: 1423/1437-1449
- Predecessor: Domhnall of Islay
- Successor: John of Islay
- Died: 1449; Dingwall
- Buried: Fortrose Cathedral, Fortrose
- Noble family: Clann Domhnaill (Clann Somhairle)
- Spouse: Elizabeth Seton
- Issue Among others: John of Islay; Hugh MacDonald, Lord of Sleat; Celestine MacDonald, Lord of Lochlash
- Father: Domhnall of Islay
- Mother: Mariota MacDonald

Alexander of Islay or Alexander MacDonald (died 1449; Scottish Gaelic: Alasdair MacDomhnaill, Dòmhnallach or MacDhòmhnaill) was a medieval Scottish nobleman who succeeded his father Domhnall of Islay as Lord of the Isles (1423–1449), later rising to the rank of Earl of Ross (1436–49). His lively career, especially before he attained the earldom of Ross, led Hugh MacDonald, the 17th century author of History of the MacDonalds, to commemorate him as "a man born to much trouble all his lifetime". Alexander allied himself with King James I of Scotland against the power of the Albany Stewarts in 1425 but, once the Albany Stewarts were out of the way, Alexander quickly found himself at odds with the new king. War with King James would initially prove Alexander's undoing, and would see the King's power in Scotland greatly increased, but at the Battle of Inverlochy Alexander's army prevailed against the forces of the King. Alexander died in 1449, having greatly extended his family's landed wealth and power. He was buried, not in the Isles of his ancestors, but at Fortrose Cathedral in his mainland Earldom of Ross.

== Biography ==
=== Alexander, the Albany Stewarts and King James ===
Alexander was the great-grandson of King Robert II of Scotland and inherited his father Domhnall's alliance with King James I of Scotland against the power of the Albany Stewarts, who by the time James returned to Scotland from English captivity in 1424 ruled more of Scotland than King James could. By 1425 James had decided to destroy the Albany Stewarts once and for all. In May of this year, Alexander attended the Stirling parliament, and sat on the jury of 21 knights and peers which ordered the execution of Murdoch (Muireadhach), Duke of Albany, along with his son Alexander and his ally Donnchadh, Earl of Lennox.

However, the destruction of the Albany Stewarts removed the main reason for the cooperation between the King and the Lord of the Isles. It is possible that, as Michael Brown believes, James acknowledged Alexander's control of the earldom of Ross as a reward for his support against Albany, in 1426. James did recognize Mariota Ross, Alexander's mother, as the heiress of Ross and by this, Alexander became the "Master of the Earldom of Ross".

As early as February 1420, his father, Donald, Lord of the Isles, appears as "Lord of the Isles and of Ross" in a papal dispensation granted for the marriage of his daughter to a grandson of Governor Albany. However, Richard Oram takes a different view, and sees Alexander's adoption of this title and occupation of much of the earldom as a provocation towards James, since it had passed to the crown after the death of John Stewart, Earl of Buchan and Ross in 1424, however, neither the Duke of Albany, nor his son, John had title superior to Donald, Lord of the Isles, and his son, Alexander. Alexander's use of this title, if it was a provocation, would have been compounded in the king's mind by the fact that Alexander's uncle John Mór MacDonald was harboring and protecting James Mór (or James the Fat), the son of Duke Murdoch, while James Mór was claiming James' throne.

=== Captivity ===
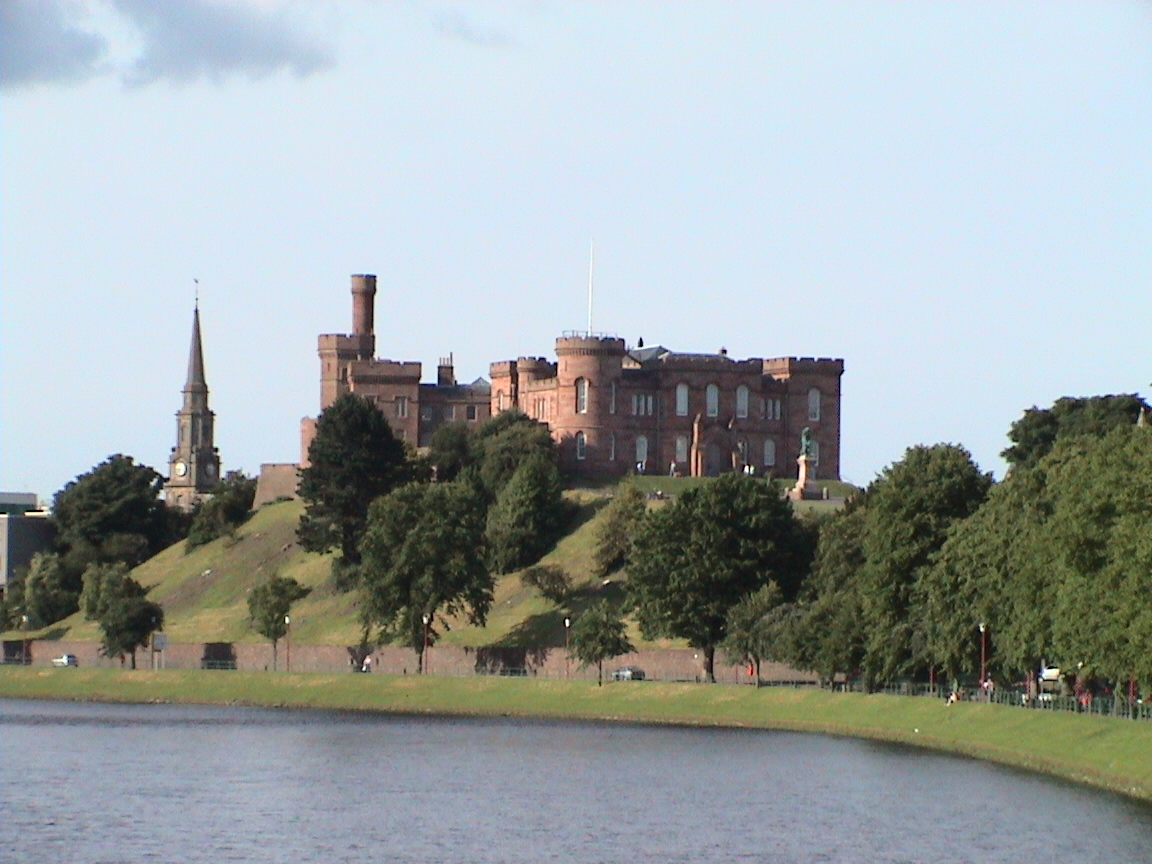
Inverness Castle, the location of Alexander's first captivity. Although the modern castle is not medieval, the site is.

Possibly due to the jealousy of the king's nobles, who had not forgotten Donald of Islay, Lord of the Isles's victory at Harlaw, the king adopted a more hostile attitude towards Donald's son, Alexander. In 1428, James traveled into the north of Scotland both to assert his authority and to bring order to the north. James summoned all the Highland clans to a meeting at Inverness. Alexander and the other clan chiefs traveled in good faith to meet James in August at Inverness, where James was holding court. James however, in a treacherous act typical of his kingship, imprisoned Alexander, his mother Mariota (by whose lineage Alexander claimed Ross) and around fifty of his followers, including his uncle and heir-designate John Mór, in the tower of Inverness Castle.

Included among the other prisoners were Alexander's most important Ross allies; men such as Aonghas Dubh MacKay, the chief of the MacKays of Strathnaver, who was married to Alexander's aunt, Elizabeth Macdonald. MacKay was a man reputed to have an army 4000 strong; a prisoner also was Aonghas' son Niall Óg, the husband of the daughter of the head of the Foulis Munro kindred of Easter Ross, one of Ross' most important families. The head of the Munros himself, George Munro, may also have been arrested, but if he was he was quickly released. William Leslie and John de Ross of Balnagown, two important landowners and kinsmen of Mariota, were also imprisoned, as were the heads of the Wester Ross Lochalsh MacMhathain (Matheson) and the Kintail MacChoinnich (MacKenzie) kindreds. Most of these men, including John Mór, seem to have been released within a short time, although James took a few back to the south with him.

According to Michael Brown and the 17th century History of the MacDonalds, James attempted to do a deal with John Mór, probably offering him the Lordship of the Isles, to which he was heir and for which he had revolted against his brother Donald decades before. John, however, refused to negotiate until his nephew, Alexander, was released. King James' plans met disaster when his messenger James Campbell attempted to arrest John Mór ("Johannis de Insulis") and killed him in the attempt. King James tried to distance himself from the killing, though Campbell claimed he acted on the king's orders. James had Campbell hanged. Before the end of 1428, Alexander was released on a promise of good behavior.

=== War against the King ===
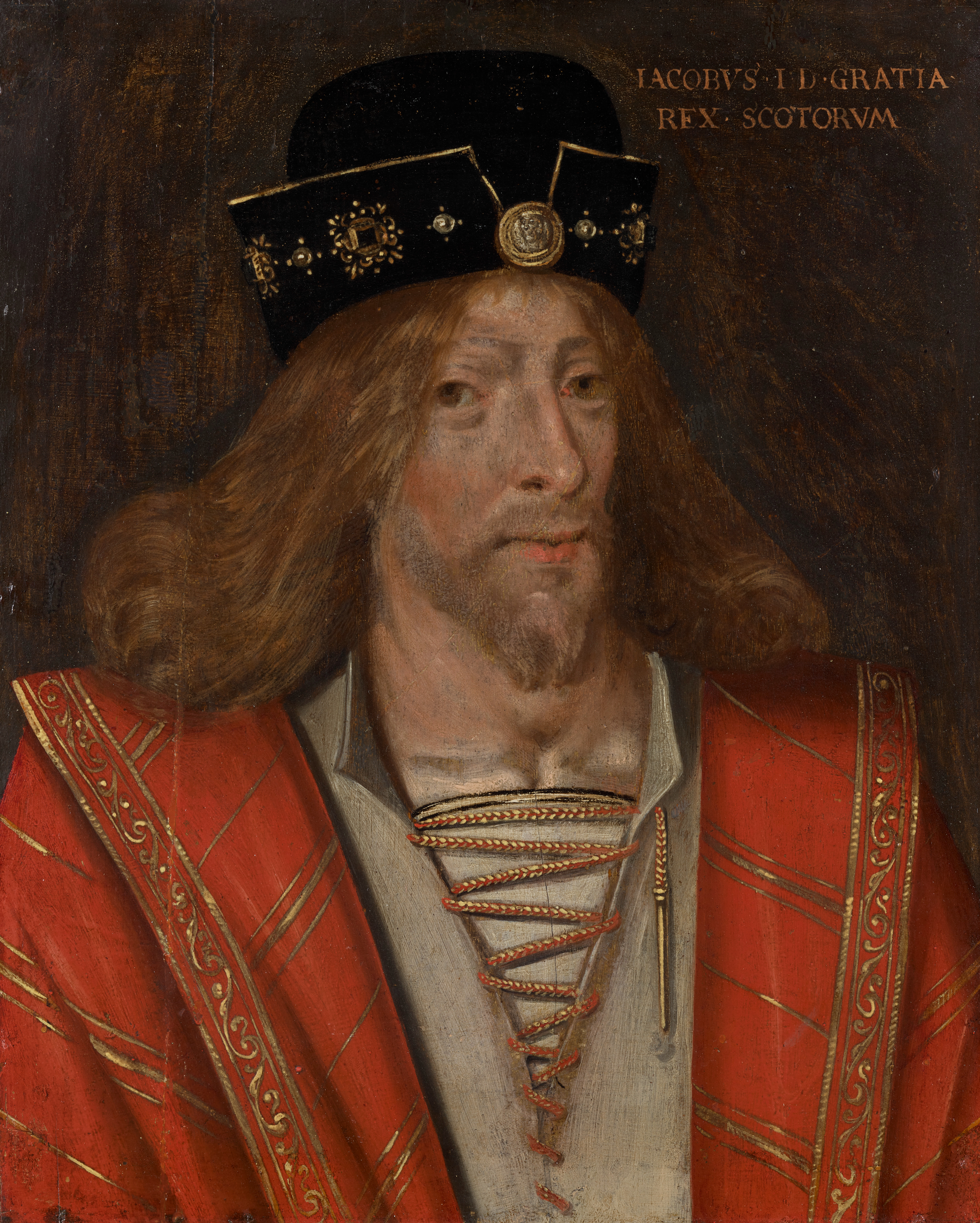
Oil-painting of James I, King of Scots (1406/24-1437).

Almost as soon as he was released, Alexander was at war with the king. His young cousin, Donald Balloch ("the Freckled"), son of Alexander's uncle John Mór, may have been seeking revenge for his father's death. He was supported by Alexander's uncle Alasdair Carrach ("the strong"), Lord of Lochaber. Together, these two men, the two most important nobles in the lordship, probably convince Alexander to go to war.

In Spring 1429, Alexander's forces advanced on Inverness. Although Maol Choluim Mac an Tóisich ("Malcolm MacKintosh"), head of Clan Chattan and custodian of the castle, managed to hold Alexander off, Alexander was still able to burn down the burgh. Alexander, meanwhile, was planning to support James Mór, son of Duke Murdoch, in his claim to the Scottish throne. James Mór had become a serious threat to King James, not merely because was he likely to have the support of Murdoch's former vassals in Lennox, Menteith and Fife, but also because he had obtained the backing of the King of England, who was angry that King James was ignoring his superior status and the terms of his release from captivity in England several years before. Now James Mór had the support of Alexander too.

At this point, however, King James was saved by the sudden death of his rival. As the Annals of the Four Masters reports:

Semus Stiuard Mac Rígh Alban, & rioghdhamhna Alban beos iarna indarbadh a h-Albain i n-Erinn do écc, iar t-techt loingis ó fheraibh Alban for a chend dia Ríoghadh.	James Stuart, son of the King of Scotland, and Roydamna of Scotland, who had been banished from Scotland to Ireland, died, after the arrival of a fleet from the men of Scotland to convey him home, that he might be made king.

In the summer, King James raised a large army and after a swift march north through Atholl and Badenoch, the royal army encountered Alexander somewhere around the borders of Lochaber and Badenoch. Although according to Walter Bower Alexander had 10,000 men, when the royal standard was unfurled the Chattan and Cameron kindreds switched over to the King. In the following engagement, Alexander was defeated. Although Alexander got away, the king capitalized on his victory by marching further north and seizing the castles of Urquhart and Dingwall. The king now sought Alexander's capture, and sent an expedition armed with artillery into the Hebrides. Alexander, who had probably fled to Islay, found himself in a very difficult position, and on 27 August 1429 surrendered to King James at Holyrood Abbey, near the burgh of Edinburgh. King James was persuaded by his magnates to give Alexander grace, and sent him to Tantallon Castle under the custody of William Douglas, 2nd Earl of Angus, King James' nephew.

=== Second captivity ===
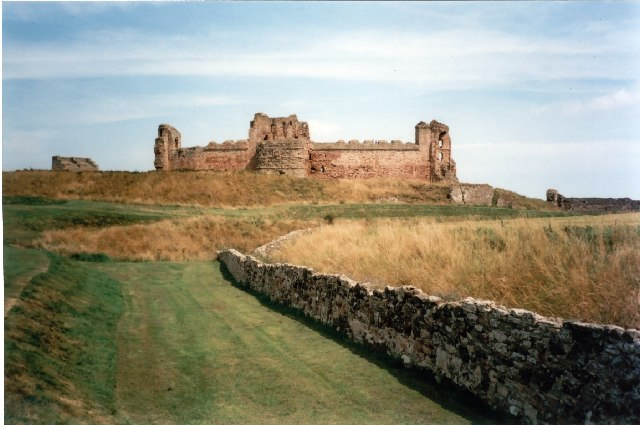
Tantallon Castle, the location of Alexander's second captivity.

While he had Alexander in custody, King James delegated the northern campaign to Alexander Stewart, Earl of Mar, with more minor roles going to Maol Choluim Mac an Tóisich, Alexander Seton of Gordon, Hugh Fraser and Aonghas de Moravia. James would never again return to Ross or Moray. Mar was given support in his role as Lieutenant when Alan Stewart, the second son of Walter Stewart, Earl of Atholl, was made Earl of Caithness in Spring 1430. The royal earldoms of Buchan and Ross, and the castle of Urquhart were put under Mar's control; by 1431 the lordship of Lochaber, held by Alasdair Carrach, was assigned to Mar's command; and by 1432 Mar had received papal dispensation to marry Margaret Seton, the mother of the heiresses to the earldom of Moray, which he would administer on their behalf. James, moreover, arranged a marriage between Lachlan Maclean, of the MacLeans of Duart, an important vassal kindred of the Lordship of the Isles, to Mar's daughter, bringing Mar's influence into the Lordship of the Isles itself. (This is questionable as Lachlan Og was actually married to Catherine, daughter of Colin Campbell, 1st Earl of Argyll. It was Lachlan his father who married Mar's daughter and that was shortly after the Battle of Harlaw in 1411.)

In 1431 Aonghas de Moravia was sent on a campaign against Aonghas Dubh MacAoidh in Strathnaver. However the main campaign was in Lochaber, where Mar hoped to make his status as Lord of Lochaber a reality. In both campaigns, however, the results were defeats for the king's forces. At the Battle of Inverlochy Mar's forces were met by both Domhnall Ballach and Alasdair Carrach of Lochaber; although Mar managed to make a long escape on foot back to Kildrummy Castle, the Earl of Caithness and 990 men were slain. In 1429, in Strathnaver, at the Battle of Drumnacoub, Aonghas Dubh MacAoidh (Angus MacKay), chief of Clan MacKay was also victorious over royal forces, this battle however was more of a family related feud. Both defeats were incurred before September 1431. James' first reaction was to raise taxes, which were granted on 16 October, in order to deliver a counter-attack; but this revenue was insufficient and James had other problems to deal with. King James therefore arranged a reconciliation with Alexander, who was pardoned for past offences and released from captivity.

=== Alexander, Earl of Ross ===
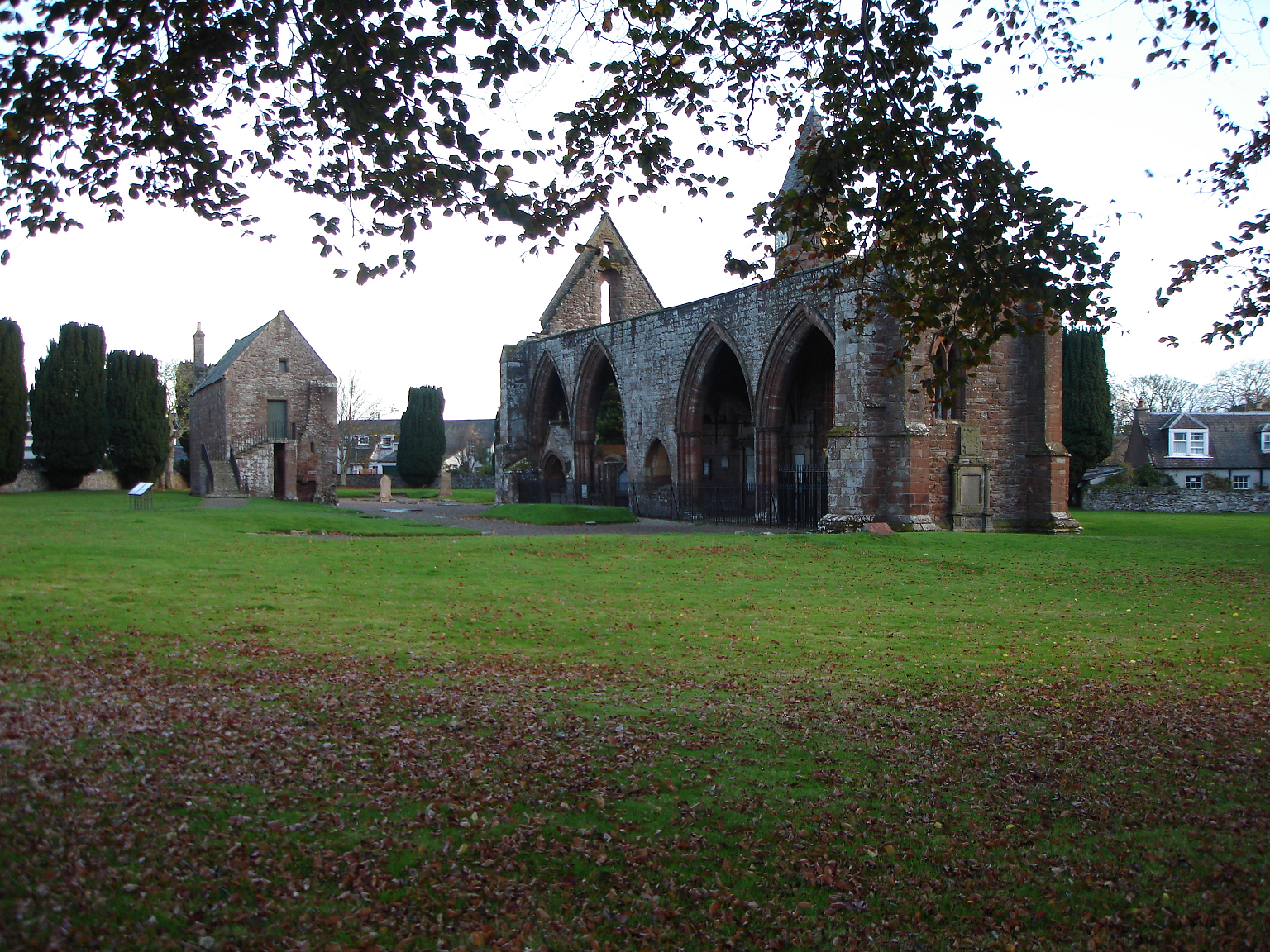
Fortrose Cathedral, burial place of Alexander.

Alexander would never again be the king's enemy, and remained subdued for the next few years. Luck, however, was on Alexander's side. The earl of Mar was in either his fifties or sixties, and his son and heir Thomas had already died in 1430. When the earl himself died in 1435, James' settlement in the north collapsed. James was in Mar by June 1436, where he was taking control of the earldom. At least by this time, and possibly early in 1436, James finally acknowledged Alexander as earl of Ross, the only magnate who could now offer security in the north-eastern Highlands. Alexander not only received control of Dingwall, but Inverness too, which he would hold until at least 1447. Moreover, the Ross earldom came with Kincardine in The Mearns, Kingedward in Buchan and Greenan in Ayrshire. By January 1437 Alexander was styling himself "Earl of Ross" in his charters, and this style was acknowledged in royal documents by 1439. Finally, by February 1439, Alexander had been appointed Justiciar of Scotia, an office which made Alexander the chief legal official in the Kingdom of Scotland.

Having achieved the chief object of his career, Alexander spent the last decade of his life consolidating his position in Ross. His charters seem to indicate that he was chiefly based at the castles of Dingwall and Inverness, and rarely anywhere else. The large number of charters issued by Alexander at Inverness is probably explained by his role as Justiciar of Scotia. Alexander's move east led to less direct lordship in the west, his original political heartland. Alexander's sons Uisdean (Hugh of Sleat) and Gilleasbaig ("Celestine") were given Sleat and Lochalsh respectively, Domhnall Ballach became more independent in Islay and Kintyre, Clan MacLeod kindred took greater control in Skye and Lewis, Clan MacLean greater control in Mull and Clan MacKintosh greater control in Lochaber.

== Marriage and children ==
Alexander married Elizabeth Seton, daughter of Alexander Seton, Lord Gordon and Elizabeth Gordon, Heiress of Gordon, some time c. 1430 in Cromarty, Ross, Scotland. They had:

- John of Islay, Earl of Ross whom married Elizabeth Livingston, daughter of James Livingston First Lord Livingston of Callendar and Marian Berwick.

Alexander had several natural with different mothers:

The daughter of Angus MacPhee of Glenpean in Lochaber

- Celestine MacDonald, Lord of Lochlash Clan MacDonald of Lochalsh., born about 1408 or 1410.

A daughter of Gillepatrick (or Patrick Roy), son of Rory, son of the lay Abbot of Applecross (a.k.a. Patrick O’Bealon) of Wester Ross. She was said to be a great beauty. Twice she was brought before King James, as Alexander could not be induced to part with her on occasion of her great beauty.

- Uisdean Hugh MacDonald, Lord of Sleat possibly in 1437 or earlier from whom the current chiefs of Clan Donald, and of Clan Uisdean (the Macdonalds of Sleat), are descended.

As well as several children of unknown mothers:

- Celestine Macdonald of Lochalsh whom married Finvola Maclean, daughter of Lachlan Lubanach Maclean
- Florence MacDonald whom married Duncan Mackintosh, 11th of Mackintosh

== Death ==
Alexander MacDonald of Islay died at Dingwall in May 1449. He was buried in Fortrose Cathedral.

== Ancestry ==
Ancestors of Alexander of Islay, Earl of Ross

16. Aonghas Mór
8. Aonghas Óg of Islay
4. John of Islay, Lord of the Isles
2. Domhnall of Islay, Lord of the Isles
20. Walter Stewart, 6th High Steward of Scotland
10. Robert II of Scotland
21. Marjorie Bruce
5. Margaret Stewart
11. Elizabeth Mure
1. Alexander of Islay, Earl of Ross
6. Walter Leslie
3. Mariota, Countess of Ross
28. Hugh, Earl of Ross
14. Uilleam III, Earl of Ross
29. Matilda de Brus
7. Euphemia I, Countess of Ross
30. Aonghas Óg of Islay
15. Màiri

== Fiction ==
Alexander of Islay is portrayed as a child, the son of Donald of Islay, Lord of the Isles, in The Strongest Heart, a novel by Regan Walker. His story, as an adult, is told in Born to Trouble, another novel by the same author. Both are books in The Clan Donald Saga.

== Notes ==
Preceded by Domhnall of Islay	Lord of the Isles; 1423–1449	Succeeded by John of Islay
Preceded by King James I Last held by John Stewart	Lord of the Earldom of Ross x1426–1437 Earl of Ross; 1437–1449	Succeeded by John of Islay
