= Earl of Ross =

Scottish title

Earldom of Ross
- Creation date: 12th century
- Peerage: Peerage of Scotland
- First holder: Ferquhard
- Last holder: Charles
- Former seat: Balnagown Castle

The Earl or Mormaer of Ross was the ruler of the province of Ross in northern Scotland, as well as chief of Clan Ross.

== Origins and transfers ==
In the early Middle Ages, Ross was part of the vast earldom of Moray. It seems to have been made a separate earldom in the mid 12th century, when Malcolm MacHeth is found designated Earl of Ross. Malcolm had earlier been imprisoned at Roxburgh for rebelling against David I, but when Malcolm's brother-in-law Somerled invaded Scotland, David was forced to relent and grant the earldom unto Malcolm.

The title was later granted by William the Lion to Floris III of Holland in 1161 upon Floris's marriage to William's sister Ada of Huntingdon. However, Floris held the title only in a nominal sense, as he took no active part in the governance of Ross. The title seems not to have been passed on, for in 1291 Floris's descendant is found complaining that he had been deprived of the earldom.

The true founder was the famous Ferquhard, from the Irish Ó Beólláin (O'Beolain, Boland, Bolan) family. This Ferquhard was the son of the lay parson of the monastery of Applecross, and was hence known as MacIntagart, meaning "son of the priest". In 1215 the newly crowned Alexander II was forced to suppress a rebellion in Moray and Ross. Ferquhard sided with the king, and captured the rebel leaders, before beheading them and presenting their heads to Alexander. For this he was knighted. He was created Earl of Ross in the 1220s, probably in 1226.

The line of Ferquhard continued until the death of William, 5th Earl of Ross, in 1372. William had two daughters, the eldest of which, Euphemia, married Sir Walter Leslie, who then became jure uxoris Earl of Ross. The Leslies continued to hold the earldom until another heiress, also named Euphemia. This Euphemia was a sickly girl, who suffered from a hunchback. Though she was nominally Countess of Ross, Ross's governance was carried out by her grandfather, the ruthless and ambitious Robert, Duke of Albany. Euphemia's uncle Donald, Lord of the Isles, had a superior claim by right of his wife, Mariota Leslie. He feared Albany would take not only Ross but more. So, in 1411, he invaded Ross with 10,000 men and won the Battle of Dingwall and the Battle of Harlaw.

In 1415 Euphemia was persuaded or forced to resign the earldom in favor of Albany's son, John. However, the Albany Stewarts would meet their downfall when King James I returned to Scotland in 1424. Robert was believed to have murdered James's brother David, who was King Robert III's heir. And he sought to capture James, the last living son. In addition, while James was in prison in London, Albany did nothing to try and free him. In revenge James had the entire family forfeited and executed (with the exception of James the Fat who escaped to Ireland). By then, the earldom had officially passed to Euphemia's grandson, Alexander of Islay (Alexander Macdonald), Lord of the Isles, who as Earl of Ross continued to hold it until his son, John forfeited it in the 1470s.

In 1481 James III granted the earldom unto his second son, also named James. James had already been made Marquis of Ormond at his baptism. In 1487 his earldom was raised to a dukedom, and he was granted the additional titles Earl of Ardmenach and Lord of Ardmannoch, Brechin and Navarre. James entered the clergy, and thus never married or had issue. He died in 1503, and all his titles became extinct.

The fourth creation was on 20 May 1565, for Henry, Lord Darnley, who was also created Lord Ardmannoch. Shortly thereafter he was created Duke of Albany. After his murder at Kirk o' Field, he was succeeded by his infant son James, whose accession as James VI a few months later returned the titles to the Crown.

Upon the investiture of Charles Stuart as Duke of Albany on 2 December 1600, he was also granted the Marquisate of Ormonde, the Earldom of Ross, and the Lordship of Ardmannoch. Charles's elder brother Henry died unexpectedly in 1612, and he became Prince of Wales as heir apparent to the throne. He acceded as king in 1625, and the titles again reverted to the Crown.

Ross currently has no earl, but it is possible the title will one day be revived for a member of the royal family. There was speculation that the title might be revived for Prince Harry; it was not.

== List of Earls of Ross ==
=== Early mormaers/earls of Ross ===
Arms of the Earls of Ross (ancient):Gules, three lions rampant argent.

- Malcolm MacHeth (died 1168)
- With the crown
- Ferquhar (died 1249)
- William I (died 1274)
- William II (died 1323)
- Hugh, Earl of Ross (died 1333) (from whom descend the chiefs of Clan Ross).
- William (died 1372)
- Euphemia I (died c. 1394)
  - Married Sir Walter Leslie
- Alexander Leslie (died 1402)
- Euphemia II (died c. 1424) (resigned c. 1415)
- John Stewart, (died 1424)
- Mariota (died c. 1429) (sister of Alexander Leslie, Earl of Ross)
  - m. Donald, Lord of the Isles
- Alexander of Islay (died 1448)
- John of Islay (died c. 1498) (forfeited 1476)

=== Earls of Ross, creation of 1481 ===
- James Stewart (1476–1504)

=== Earls of Ross, creation of 1565 ===
- Henry Stuart (1546–1567) (later Duke of Albany and King of Scotland)
- James Stuart (1566–1625) (later King of Scotland and King of England)

=== Earls of Ross, creation of 1600 ===
- Charles Stuart (1600–1649) (became king in 1625)

== Family tree ==
Earls of Ross family tree
(Dates indicate time period as Earl or Countess of Ross)

Clan Ross
Fearchar mac an t-sagairt Earl of Ross bef. 1225–1251
William I Earl of Ross; 1251–1274
William II; Earl of Ross; 1274–1323
Hugh; Earl of Ross; 1323–1333
Clan Stewart
Elizabeth of Rowallan	Robert II; King of Scots	Euphemia de Ross	William III; Earl of Ross; 1336–1372
Anabella Drummond	Robert III; King of Scots	Muriel Keith	Robert Stuart; Duke of Albany; Earl of Buchan	Margaret Graham; Countess of Menteith	Alexander the Wolf of Badenoch; Earl of Ross de jure uxoris	Euphemia; Countess of Ross suo jure 1372–1394	Walter Leslie	Margaret Stewart	John Macdonald; Lord of the Isles
Joan Beauford	James I King of Scots	John Stewart; Earl of Buchan, Earl of Ross; 1415	Isabel Stewart	Alexander Leslie; Earl of Ross c. 1395–1402	Mary Leslie; Countess of Ross suo jure 1415–1435	Donald Macdonald; Lord of the Isles
Marie of Gueldres	James II; King of Scots	Euphemia Leslie; Countess of Ross suo jure 1402–1415	Alexander Macdonald; Lord of the Isles, Earl of Ross c. 1435–1449
Margaret of Denmark	James III; King of Scots	Princess Mary Stewart; Countess of Arran	James; 1st Lord Hamilton	John Macdonald; Lord of the Isles, Earl of Ross; 1449–1475
Margaret Tudor	James IV; King of Scots	Elizabeth Hamilton	Matthew Stewart; Earl of Lennox
Mary of Guise	James V King of Scots	John Stewart; Earl of Lennox	Elizabeth Stewart
Matthew Stuart; Earl of Lennox	Margaret Douglas
Mary; Queen of Scots	Henry Stuart; Earl of Ross, Lord Darnley; 1565–1566/7
James I King of England, Ireland & Scotland; 1567–1600
Charles I King of England, Ireland & Scotland; 1600–1649

References:
- "Document 1/7/113 (_RRS_, iii, no. 110)". People of Medieval Scotland.
- Baldwin, John (1986). "The Earldom of Ross and the Lordship of the Isles". Firthlands of Ross and Sutherland (PDF). Edinburgh: Scottish Society for Northern Studies. p. 64. ISBN 0-9505994-4-1. OCLC 16692908.
- Bain, Robert (1899). History of the ancient province of Ross (The County Palatine of Scotland) from the earliest times to the present time. Dingwall: Pefferside Press. pp. 80–82 – via Internet Archive.

Family tree of the: Earls of Angus, Earls of Avondale, Earls of Douglas, Marquesses of Douglas, Earls of Forfar, Earls of Ormond and Marquesses of Ormond, Earls of Ross and Dukes of Ross

Earl of Angus (Stewart line) and Lord of Bonkyl, 1329
John Stewart d. 1331; 1st Earl of Angus, etc., Lord of Abernethy jure uxoris	William the Hardy; 1243–1298; Lord of Douglas
Thomas Stewart b. before 1331–1361; 2nd Earl of Angus, etc.	Archibald Douglas d. 1333	James Douglas "the Good" c. 1286–1330; Lord of Douglas
Earl of Douglas, 1358
Robert III c. 1337–1406; King of Scotland	Margaret Stewart d. 1417; 3rd Countess of Angus, etc.	William Douglas c. 1323–1384; 1st Earl of Douglas	Archibald Douglas "the Grim" c. 1330 – c. 1400; 3rd Earl of Douglas, Earl of Wigtown, Lord of Galloway, Lord of Douglas, Lord of Bothwell
Earl of Angus transferred from the Stewarts to the Douglasses when Margaret resigned her title in deference to her son, 1389	Earl of Avondale and Lord Balveny, 1437
James I 1394–1437; King of Scotland	Mary Stewart c. 1380–c. 1460	George Douglas; 1380–1430; 1st Earl of Angus, etc.	James Douglas c. 1358–1388; 2nd Earl of Douglas, Earl of Mar	Archibald Douglas "Tyneman" c. 1369–1424; Duke of Touraine, 4th Earl of Douglas, Earl of Wigtown, 13th Lord of Douglas, Lord of Galloway, Lord of Douglas, Lord of Bothwell m. Margaret of Carrick, daughter of Robert III	James Douglas; 1371–1443; 7th Earl of Douglas, 1st Earl of Avondale, etc.
William Douglas; 1398–1437; 2nd Earl of Angus, etc.	Douglases of Drumlanrig	Archibald Douglas c. 1391–1439; Duke of Touraine, 5th Earl of Douglas, Earl of Wigtown, Lord of Galloway, Lord of Douglas, Lord of Bothwell, Lord of Selkirk and Ettrick Forest, Eskdale, Lauderdale, Liddesdale and Annandale, Count of Longueville, Seigneur de Dun-le-roi
Earl of Ormond (Scotland) (1st creation), 1445
James II; 1430–1460; King of Scotland	James Douglas; 1428–1446; 3rd Earl of Angus, etc.	George Douglas c. 1427–1463; 4th Earl of Angus, etc.	William Douglas c. 1424–1440; Duke of Touraine, 6th Earl of Douglas, Earl of Wigtown, Lord of Galloway, Lord of Bothwell, Lord of Selkirk and Ettrick Forest, Eskdale, Lauderdale, and Annandale, Count of Longueville, Seigneur de Dun-le-roi	William Douglas; 1425–1452; 8th Earl of Douglas, 2nd Earl of Avondale, etc.	James Douglas; 1426–1491; 9th Earl of Douglas, 3rd Earl of Avondale, etc.	Hugh Douglas d. 1455; Earl of Ormond
Earldom of Douglas and Earldom of Avondale forfeit, 1491	Eardom of Ormand forfeit, 1455
James III; 1451/1452–1448; King of Scotland	Archibald Douglas c. 1449–1513; 5th Earl of Angus, etc.
Marquess of Ormond (Scotland) (1st creation), 1476; Earl of Ross, 1481; Duke of Ross, 1488
James IV; 1473–1513; King of Scotland	James Stewart; 1476–1504; Duke of Ross, etc.	George Douglas; 1469–1513 styled Master of Angus	William Douglas of Glenbervie; 1473–1513
Dukedom of Ross (1488 creation), Marqessate of Ormond (1st creation) and Earldom of Ross (1481 creation) extinct, 1504
Duke of Ross (2nd creation), 1514
James V 1512–1542; King of Scotland	Alexander Stewart; 1514–1515; Duke of Ross	Archibald Douglas; 1490–1557; 6th Earl of Angus, etc.	George Douglas of Pittendreich d. 1552	Archibald Douglas of Glenbervie; 1513–1570
Dukedom of Ross (2nd creation) extinct, 1515	Earl of Ross (1565 creation)
Mary; 1542–1587; Queen of Scotland	Henry Stuart; 1546–1567; Duke of Albany, 1st Earl of Ross, Lord Darnley, Lord Ardmannoch	David Douglas c. 1515–1558; 7th Earl of Angus, etc.	William Douglas; 1533–1591; 9th Earl of Angus, etc.
James VI and I 1566–1625; 2nd Earl of Ross, later King of Scotland	Archibald Douglas; 1555–1588; 8th Earl of Angus, etc., Earl of Morton	William Douglas; 1553–1611; 10th Earl of Angus, etc.
Earldom of Ross (1565 creation), merged with the crown
Marquess of Ormond (Scotland) (2nd creation), Earl of Ross, and Lord Ardmannoch, 1600	Earldom of Angus (1389 creation) resigned in favor of: Marquess of Douglas, Earl of Angus, Lord Abernethy, Lord Bonkyll and Preston, Lord Abernethy, and Lord Jedburgh Forest, 1633
Elizabeth Stuart; 1596–1662	Charles Stuart; 1600–1649; Marquess of Ormond, etc., Later King Charles I of England and Scotland	William Douglas; 1589–1660; 1st Marquess of Douglas, etc. 11th Earl of Angus, etc. (1389 creation)
Marquessate of Ormand (2nd creation) and Earldom of Ross (1600 creation) merged with the Crown, 1625
Earl of Ormond (Scotland) (2nd creation), 1651
Sophia of Hanover; 1630–1714	Archibald Douglas; 1609–1655; 1st Earl of Ormond
Earl of Forfar (1st creation), 1661
King George I 1660–1727	James Douglas c. 1646–1700; 2nd Marquess of Douglas, etc.	Archibald Douglas; 1653–1712; 2nd Earl of Ormond, 1st Earl of Forfar
Duke of Douglas, Marquess of Angus and Abernethy, Viscount of Jedburgh Forest, Lord Douglas of Bonkill, Prestoun, and Robertoun, 1703
King George II; 1683–1760	Archibald Douglas; 1694–1761; 1st Duke of Douglas, etc., 3rd Marquess of Douglas, etc.	Archibald Douglas; 1692–1715; 3rd Earl of Ormond, 2nd Earl of Forfar
Dukedom of Douglas, marquessate of Angus and Abernethy, and viscountcy of Jedburgh Forest, lordship Douglas of Bonkill, Prestoun, and Robertoun extinct, 1761; Marquessate of Douglas, earldom of Angus, and lordship of Abernethy and Jedburgh Forest passed to James Hamilton, 7th Duke of Hamilton	Earldoms of Ormond and Forfar extinct, 1715
Frederick; 1707–1751; Prince of Wales
King George III; 1683–1760
Edward Augustus; 1767–1820; Duke of Kent and Strathearn
Queen Victoria; 1819–1901
King Edward VII; 1841–1910
Duke of Clarence and Avondale and Earl of Athlone, 1890
Prince Albert Victor; 1864–1892; Duke of Clarence and Avondale, etc.	King George V 1865–1936
Dukedom of Clarence and Avondale and Earldom of Athlone extinct, 1892
King George VI; 1895–1952
Queen Elizabeth II; 1926–2022
Earl of Forfar (2nd creation), 2019
Prince Edward b. 1964; Duke of Edinburgh, Earl of Forfar
