= Glenquithle =

Locality in Aberdeenshire, Scotland

Glenquithle (Note: Formerly known as Glendowachy or Glendowachie) is a steep valley, locality, former feudal barony and thanage, 965 metres south west of Pennan in Aberdeenshire, Scotland.

== History ==
Hugh, Earl of Ross was granted the barony and thanage of Glendowachy by King Robert I of Scotland, which had previously been held by John Comyn, Earl of Buchan.

The location of the caput of the barony is yet to be properly identified.
