= Mariota, Countess of Ross =

Scottish noblewoman

Mariota Leslie
- Born: Scotland
- Died: 1440; Scotland
- Spouse: Donald of Islay, Lord of the Isles
- Issue: Alexander Macdonald, 10th Earl of Ross; Angus Macdonald; Anna Macdonald
- House: Clan Donald
- Father: Walter Leslie, Lord of Ross
- Mother: Euphemia I, Countess of Ross

Mariota Leslie (Mairead, also called Mary and Margaret; died 1440) was the daughter of Euphemia I, Countess of Ross and her husband, the crusading war-hero Walter Leslie, Lord of Ross. Upon the death of her brother, Alexander Leslie, Earl of Ross, she became the heiress presumptive of her niece Euphemia II, Countess of Ross although her husband Domhnall of Islay, Lord of the Isles pressed Mariota's superior claim to the earldom.

Domhnall attempted to gain control of the earldom, and sometime after 1405 but before 1411, Domhnall gained control of Dingwall Castle. In the year after the death of the nominal king Robert III of Scotland (1406), in August 1407, Domhnall sent emissaries to England to the heir of the throne, the captive James Stewart. King Henry IV of England sent his own emissaries the following year to negotiate an alliance against Robert Stewart, Duke of Albany, the Guardian of Scotland who was controlling Euphemia and the earldom.

With control over the principal seat of the earldom of Ross and support of the exiled heir to the Scottish throne, in 1411 Domhnall felt strong enough to march against Albany's main northern ally, Alexander Stewart, Earl of Mar. At the Battle of Harlaw Domhnall gained the victory (though the Lowlanders claimed otherwise), and withdrew back to his Isles and the Western Highlands. In the aftermath, though the people of Ross welcomed their new Macdonald lord, and in February 1420 in a papal dispensation granted for the marriage of Donald's daughter to a grandson of Governor Albany, Donald appears as ‘Lord of the Isles and of Ross’. Notwithstanding all this, Albany was able to retake Dingwall and seize control of Easter Ross. In 1415, Euphemia was persuaded by Albany to resign the earldom to his own second son, John Stewart, Earl of Buchan. This action was challenged by Domhnall of Islay, Lord of the Isles, who continued to claim the earldom on behalf of his wife, Mariota. {{Citation needed}}

After the return of King James the latter destroyed the power of the Albany Stewarts, executing the Albany's son and successor Murdoch Stewart, Duke of Albany. Domhnall had died in 1423, but Mariota continued to enjoy the support of his successor, her son, Alexander. Alexander took over her claims, and in 1437 her son was recognized as earl by James I, who called Donald Macdonald the "first Lord of Ross of his name". She died in 1440.

Mariota had:

- Alexander, 9th Earl of Ross whom married Elizabeth Seton, daughter of Alexander Seton, Lord Gordon and Elizabeth Gordon, Heiress of Gordon
- Angus, who became Bishop of the Isles
- Anna

Preceded by Euphemia II	Countess of Ross opposed by John Stewart; 1415–1437	Succeeded by Alexander of Islay, Earl of Ross
