= Battle of Dingwall =

Scottish clan battle

Coordinates: 57.597°N 4.428°W

- Part of the Scottish clan wars
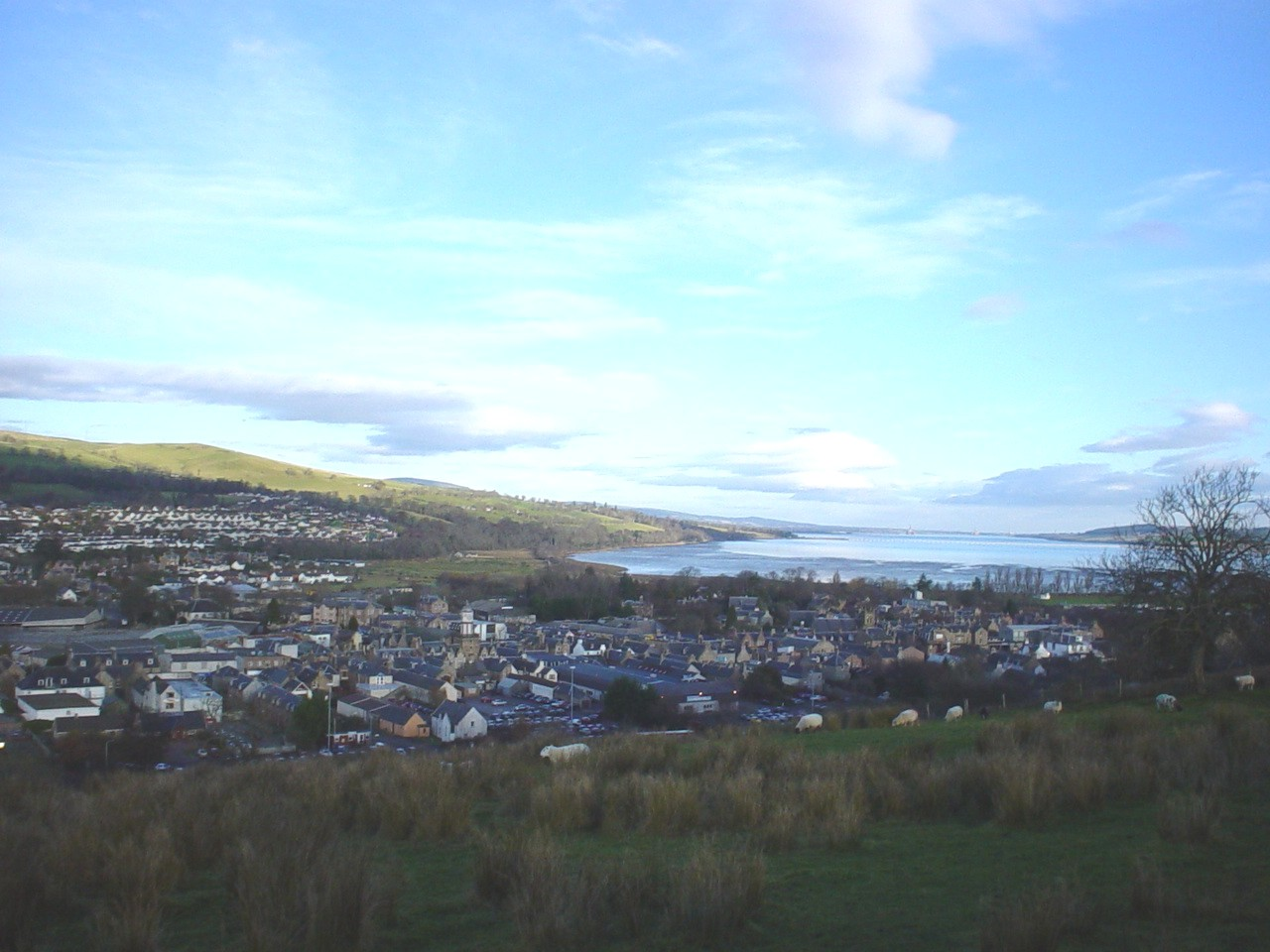
- Modern day Dingwall looking out towards the Cromarty Firth
Date	1411
Location	Dingwall, Scotland
Result	Lordship victory

Belligerents
Kingdom of Scotland (Clan Mackay and allies)	Lordship of the Isles (Clan Donald and allies)

Commanders and leaders
Angus Mackay (POW)	Donald of Islay

Strength
4,000 men	10,000 men

Casualties and losses
Unknown	Unknown

The Battle of Dingwall was a Scottish clan battle said to have taken place in the year 1411, in Dingwall in the Scottish Highlands. It was fought between the Clan Mackay and the Clan Donald.

== Accounts of the Battle ==
=== Sir Robert Gordon (c. 1630) ===
Sir Robert Gordon, from his book the A Genealogical History of the Earldom of Sutherland:

This Angus-Dow Mackay fought against Donald, Lord of the Isles at Dingwall in Ross, because that Donald had molested some friends which Angus-Dow had in that country. At this conflict Angus Dow was overcome and taken prisoner, and his brother Rory-Gald, with divers others, were slain. Donald of the Isles having detained Angus-Dow a while in captivity, released him, and gave him his daughter in marriage, whom Angus-Dow carried home with him to Strathnaver, and had a son by her, called Niel-Wass, so named because he was imprisoned in the Bass.

=== Robert Mackay (1829) ===
Robert Mackay gives an account of the battle in his book History of the House and Clan of Mackay (1829), quoting from A Genealogical History of the Earldom of Sutherland by Sir Robert Gordon:

Donald of the Isles, says Sir Robert, conceived such indignation and displeasure at his being deprived of the earldom, that he raised all the power of the Isles, and invaded and spoiled the country of Ross, where he was met by Angus-Dow Mackay, some of whose friends he had injured; a severe conflict ensued, when Mackay, overpowered by numbers, was overcome, his brother Roderick slain, and himself taken prisoner. Emboldened by this victory, Donald marched through Inverness and Murray, threatening to destroy all before him, which issued in the well known Battle of Harlaw, fought in the year 1411; in which there were slain on Donald's part, MacLean and MacKintosh, and on the other side Sir Alexander Ogilvy, Sir James Scrimeor, Sir Alexander Irvine of Drum, Sir William Aberthy of Saltoun, Sir Robert Maule of Panmure, Sir Robert Davidson, and divers other gentlemen.

== Aftermath ==
In the aftermath of the Battle of Dingwall and the Battle of Harlaw, according to 17th-century historian Sir Robert Gordon, chief Angus Du Mackay married a daughter of Donald MacDonald, Lord of the Isles. However, 19th-century historian Angus Mackay states that chief Angus Du Mackay actually married a sister of the Lord of the Isles, not his daughter.

== Other accounts ==
According to Alister Farquar Matheson, Angus Mackay led a force of Mackays, Munros, Mackenzies and Dingwalls at the Battle of Dingwall against Donald of Islay, Lord of the Isles. According to Norman Macrae, The Eagle Stone near Dingwall was placed there by the Munros while marching against Donald of Islay, Lord of the Isles in 1411. However, according to Charles Ian Fraser, there is no positive proof for the assumption that the Munros were with Angus Mackay at this battle and that some Munros did in fact fight in the Lord of the Isles' host at the subsequent Battle of Harlaw.
