= William III, Earl of Ross =

Scottish nobleman (died 1372)

- Coat of arms
- Tenure: 1333–1372
- Predecessor: Hugh, Earl of Ross
- Successor: Euphemia I, Countess of Ross
- Died: 1372
- Spouse: Máire, daughter of Aonghus Óg of Islay (died)
- Issue: William; Euphemia I, Countess of Ross; Joanna
- Father: Hugh, Earl of Ross
- Mother: Matilda Bruce

William (or Uilleam) III, 5th Earl of Ross (d. 1372) was a fourteenth-century Scottish nobleman. He was the fifth O’Beolan earl of Ross, descending from the founder of the line, Fearchar of Ross (or Fearchar MacTaggart).

== Biography ==
William was the son of Hugh, Earl of Ross, and his wife Maud aka Matilda de Brus, sister of King Robert the Bruce. He was first cousin to David II, king of Scotland, through his mother, who was a sister of Robert the Bruce.

William was in Norway at the time of his father's death at the Battle of Halidon Hill in 1333, but returned in 1336 and took possession of the earldom. Soon after his return, the earl undertook the rebuilding of the ruinous Fearn Abbey, which had been founded by Fearchar MacTaggart in the previous century.

The life of William, Earl of Ross, is closely entwined with the political and military events of the reign of David II, who was ever vigilant to repel the English as they undertook to conquer Scotland. In 1339, the English, in support of Edward Baliol's who had sworn fealty to the English king and recognised him as overlord of Scotland, held the city of Perth, and the earl played a key role in the siege of that city on King David's behalf. Aware that the defensive channel of water around the town made it difficult for the Scots to enter the city, Ross and his men diverted the waters and filled in the ditch with driftwood, giving them access to the city walls. At this point, the English garrison surrendered.

In 1342, Ross granted a charter for ten davochs (about 4,160 acres or 104 Scots acres) of land in Kintail to Ronald MacRuari (Raghnall MacRuaidhrí), a relation of John of Islay (Eóin Mac Domhnaill I), Lord of the Isles, a descendant of Somerled.

In 1346, David summoned his earls and their men to gather at Perth in advance of an incursion into England. However, before the assembled army pulled out, William became embroiled in a dispute with his vassal Ronald MacRuari and killed him at the priory of Elcho. Fearing repercussions, the earl pulled back to the safety of his own territories, and many other northern lords followed suit. David continued south into England where he was taken captive at the Battle of Neville's Cross near Durham for what turned out to be a period of eleven years.

While David was imprisoned, Earl William undertook additional measures that ultimately would alienate the king, as evidenced by court records showing that he seized all the proceeds of the court in 1348. However, in 1349, David, while still in captivity, was still relying on William in his role as justiciar of Scotland north of the Forth, by asking him to attend to a matter involving William de Deyn, Bishop of Aberdeen, in his conflict with William of St. Michael, who had seized some property of the Church. This case was resolved in Aberdeenshire at one of the courts which were still being held at the ancient Stone Circles of northern Scotland.

Nonetheless, William's behavior at the priory of Elchor, combined with his less than honorable behavior in 1348, had eroded the king's trust in him, and by 1355 he had been replaced as justiciar.

On 3 October 1357, the King David II of Scotland was finally released at Berwick on the condition that a ransom payment be secured by the taking of 20 Scottish hostages, with Earl William (or possibly his young son) named as one of the six noblemen to serve as hostages on a rotating basis. Earl William had attended the session of Parliament where plans for the ransom of David II were discussed.

Upon David's return to Scotland, he imposed heavy taxation on his nobles in order to pay his ransom, a move which led to a rebellion of the Highland lords, including William and his half-brother, Hugh de Rarichies, in 1366. In 1368, Ross and the others were required to find security to keep the peace.

Near the end of his life, William was forced to change the entail on his earldom. His only son, William, was a sickly lad, and the earl was well aware that if the boy died, leaving him without a male heir, the earldom would pass out of the Mactaggart family. To prevent this from coming to pass, he consulted with his sister Marjory, Countess of Caithness and Orkney, who consented to entailing the earldom to their half-brother, Hugh of Rarichies. This arrangement, which happened in 1350, would have had the effect of preserving the earldom in the Mactaggart family. Although young William was named in 1354 as one of the hostages for the king's ransom, records show that by August 1357 he was quite ill and must have died soon after. Indeed, in 1357, young William died, but fourteen years later, King David, never fond of William for his earlier bad decisions, ripped the earldom out of the Mactaggart line.

Instead of agreeing that Hugh of Rarichies would succeed William, the king settled the earldom on William's daughter, Euphemia, and then forced her to marry Walter de Leslie, who had made a name for himself fighting with the king of France, with the Holy Roman Emperors in the Northern Crusades, and with Peter of Cyprus on his Alexandrian Crusade. David II wished to reward this internationally renowned Scotsman for his bravery by settling an earldom on him. To this end, at Perth on 23 October 1370, David took the step of re-confirming William in the earldom of Ross and lordship of Skye, but only with the unwelcome stipulation that he must give his daughter in marriage to Leslie. Though Ross planned to seek help through the chancellor, he was stopped by the forces of Walter Leslie, who waylaid and attacked his emissaries. In 1371, after King David died, William appealed to Robert II, whom he had fought with at the Siege of Perth when Robert was High Steward of Scotland, but to no avail.

William, Earl of Ross, died on 9 February 1372 at Denly in Ross-shire, the last of the O’Baleon earls of Ross. He was succeeded by his daughter Euphemia and her husband Walter de Lesley.

== Family ==
William, 5th Earl of Ross, married first Mary (Máire), a daughter of Angus Og of Islay (Aonghus Óg Mac Domhnaill), (d. 1314×1318/c.1330), chief of Clan Donald (Clann Domhnaill). They had one son and two daughters:

- William, d. 1357.
- Euphemia, Countess of Ross, married Walter de Lesley, who became Earl of Ross in her right.
- Joanna (or Janet), married in 1375 Sir Alexander Fraser of Cowie, ancestor of the Lords Saltoun of the Fraser line; d. before 1400.

Preceded by Aodh	Mormaer of Ross; 1333/6–1370/2	Succeeded by Euphemia m. Walter Leslie
