= Euphemia II, Countess of Ross =

Scottish noblewoman

- Tenure: 1402-June 1415
- Predecessor: Alexander Leslie, Earl of Ross
- Successor: John Stewart, Earl of Buchan
- Born: c. 1399

Euphemia II, Countess of Ross (also Euphemia Leslie) was the daughter of Alexander Leslie, Earl of Ross and his wife Isabella Stewart, daughter of Robert Stewart, 1st Duke of Albany. She was the only child and heir of Earl Alexander, and succeeded to the earldom de jure upon his death in 1402.

== Life ==
She became a ward of her grandfather Robert Stewart, 1st Duke of Albany from a precept of 11 July 1405, and never seems to have exercised much power in the province of Ross. Governor Albany became Regent and persuaded her to resign the earldom to his own second son, John Stewart, Earl of Buchan. This action was challenged by Domhnall of Islay, Lord of the Isles, who claimed the earldom on behalf of his wife Mariota and who became an enemy of the Albany Stewarts. In 1411 he marched an army of 10,000 Islesmen and Ross vassals against Albany's main northern ally, Alexander Stewart, Earl of Mar.

There was a failed attempt to marry Euphemia to Thomas Dunbar, the son of Thomas Dunbar, Earl of Moray.

Euphemia thereafter disappears from the record, retiring to the nunnery of North Berwick. Some histories report that she was a hunchback 'of a weakly constitution, small, and deformed'.

Preceded by Alexander Leslie	Countess of Ross; 1402–1415	Succeeded by John Stewart ¹ ¹Opposed by Mariota with her husband Domhnall of Islay.
