= Walter Leslie (crusader) =

Scottish nobleman

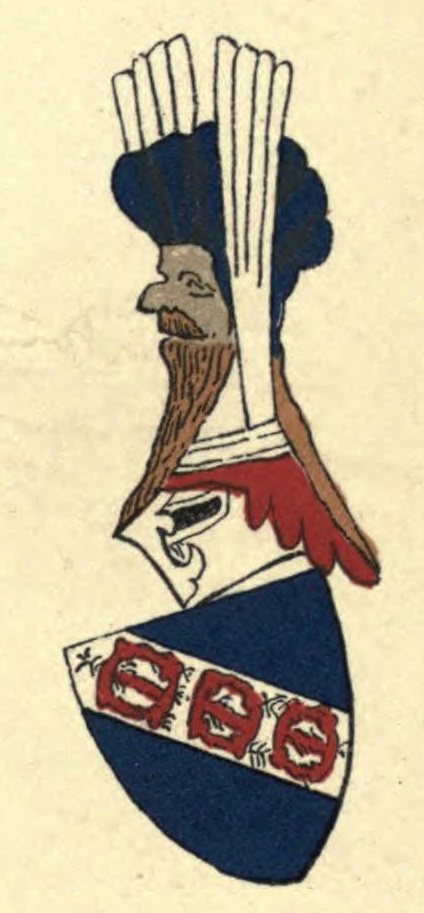
Arms of Sir Walter Leslie from the Armorial de Gelre. Sir Walter's crest, a Saracen's head, is testament to his crusader image.

Sir Walter Leslie (died 1382) was a 14th-century Scottish nobleman and crusader, one of the foremost knights of his time.

== Family ==
Leslie was a younger son, probably the third son, of Sir Andrew Leslie of Leslie Castle sixth in line from Bartholomew, founder of the name Leslie in Aberdeenshire, by his wife Mary Abernethy, daughter and coheiress of Sir Alexander Abernethy.

== Life ==
Along with his elder brother Norman, he obtained safe conduct through England on his way to Prussia to participate in a crusade against the pagans of that region. He had returned by 1356. He is then said to have gone to France, to aid the French in their wars with the English. He must have gone there more than once, for he was present at the Battle of Pontvallain in 1370, where he proved instrumental in the English defeat, and was rewarded by King Charles with a yearly pension of two hundred gold francs.

He was present in Scotland in 1363, when King David granted him a pension of forty pounds sterling. Later that year, David obtained from Edward III of England a safe passage for Walter and Norman to travel to the Holy Land. They traveled via Italy; they appear as witnesses to a deal signed by the authorities of Florence with the notorious "White Band", a group of English mercenaries who had fought in the Hundred Years' War and were then plying their trade in Italy. Walter and Norman eventually joined the crusade of Peter King of Cyprus, as the latter attacked the Egyptian city of Alexandria. The city was captured, but King Peter was unable to hold it, and abandoned the city after looting it.

Walter returned to Scotland in 1366, and was warmly welcomed by King David. The king was fascinated by the cult of the crusader, and Walter's previous exploits had already made him one of the royal favorites. As a reward for his latest exploits, David gave him permission to marry Euphemia, the daughter and heiress of the Earl of Ross, whom David coerced into allowing the marriage. The marriage took place on 13 September of the same year. After this, he appears to have remained in Scotland for a time, taking a prominent part in public affairs and frequently witnessing royal charters.

When King David died in 1371, Walter may have been worried that the new king, Robert Stewart, who was an ally of the Earl of Ross, may have rescinded the patronage. However, the new king did not, and when Ross died in 1372, Euphemia inherited the title, and Walter became jure uxoris earl or lord of Ross.

== Death and legacy ==
Walter died at Perth on 27 February 1382. He left two children, Alexander (the future Earl of Ross) and Mariota, who would marry Donald Lord of the Isles. Although Alexander did eventually inherit the earldom, de facto control of Ross passed into the hands of the Earl of Buchan, a.k.a. the "Wolf of Badenoch", who was Countess Euphemia's second husband before she divorced him in 1392.
