= Euphemia I, Countess of Ross =

Scottish countess (d. 1394–1398)

Euphemia
- Countess of Ross
- Coat of arms
- Tenure: 1372–1394 x 1398
- Predecessor: Uilleam III, 5th Earl of Ross
- Successor: Alexander Leslie, 7th Earl of Ross
- Issue: Alexander Leslie, Earl of Ross; Mariota Leslie, Countess of Ross
- Father: Uilleam III, Earl of Ross
- Mother: Máire, daughter of Aonghus Óg of Islay

Euphemia I (d. 1394–1398), also called Euphemia of Ross and Euphemia Ross, and sometimes incorrectly styled Euphemia Leslie and Euphemia Stewart (Scottish women in this period did not abandon natal names for married names), was a Countess of Ross in her own right.

== Biography ==
Euphemia was the elder daughter of Uilleam III, the last O'Beolan Mormaer of Ross. Her first marriage was compelled against the wishes of her father. King David II desired to bestow an earldom on Walter de Leslie, who had distinguished himself in combat in Europe and in Alexandria, Egypt. To give the earldom of Ross to Leslie, he forced Euphemia to marry him and, on 23 October 1370, renewed the earldom of Ross to Euphemia’s father only on the condition that it pass to Euphemia and Leslie upon his death. The charter of the earldom of Ross and of the lands of Skye was made to them in their own favor and that of their heirs male and female in reversion.

She married Leslie, by papal dispensation, dated 24 November 1366 (variously reported as December 1367), the dispensation being necessary in that Walter Leslie had had illicit intercourse with a woman related within the fourth degree of kinship with Euphemia

Leslie predeceased her in 1382, whereupon she married, secondly, Alexander Stewart, 1st Earl of Buchan, better known in history as "The Wolf of Badenoch." This marriage occurred on 24 or 25 July 1382. However, on 9 June 1392, Pope Clement VII issued a commission to dissolve this marriage and then on 5 and 15 December to grant a divorce. The date of Euphemia's death is not certain. She was still alive on 5 September 1394, and it is possible that 20 February 1394/5, usually assigned as the date of Stewart's death, was that of her own.

== Family ==
By Sir Walter Leslie she had issue:

- Sir Alexander Leslie, Earl of Ross, who became Earl of Ross.
- Mariota, who married Donald (of Harlaw) Macdonald, and in her right, succeeded to the earldom of Ross, and carried it to a new family, the Macdonald Lords of the Isles.

Preceded by Uilleam III	Countess of Ross; 1372–1394 x 1398	Succeeded by Alexander Leslie
