= Hugh, Earl of Ross =

Scottish governor

Hugh de Ross
- Mormaerdom: Ross
- Successor: William III
- Born: bef. 1297
- Died: 19 July 1333; Halidon Hill
- Family: Ross
- Wives: Matilda (Maud) de Brus; Margaret de Graham
- Father: William II, Earl of Ross
- Mother: Euphemia de Berkeley

Coat of arms of the Earls of Ross

Hugh [probably Gaelic: Aodh], was the third successor of Ferchar mac in tSagairt as Mormaer of Ross (1323–1333).

== Biography ==
Hugh de Ross was the eldest son and heir of William II, Earl of Ross, by his wife Euphemia de Berkeley, or Barclay.

Hugh was a favorite of King Robert I of Scotland, who endowed him with many lands. Hugh even married Robert's sister, Matilda (Maud) de Brus (c. 1287 - aft. September 1323), in 1308 in the Orkney Isles. Hugh's young brother, John, married Margaret Comyn, heiress of Buchan (although he died childless).

== Marriages and issue ==
Hugh de Ross married twice: (1) Matilda (Maud) de Brus, sister of Robert I "the Bruce", King of Scots, and daughter of Robert de Brus, 6th Lord of Annandale, and his wife Marjorie, Countess of Carrick; married in 1308. Hugh and Matilda had several children:

- William de Ross III, oldest son and successor, made Earl of Ross on 17 May 1336.
- Marjory de Ross, wife of Malise V, Earl of Strathearn
- John de Ross, who died on 27 May 1364 without issue.

(2) Margaret de Graham, daughter of Sir John de Graham of Abercorn; married by papal dispensation dated 24 November 1329. Hugh and Margaret had two known children:

- Hugh de Ross of Rarichies, first of Balnagown; declared heir to the earldom of Ross in 1350; was a hostage for the return of David II King of Scotland from the English in 1351.
- Euphemia de Ross, married (1) John Randolph, 3rd Earl of Moray and (2) by dispensation (due to affinity) Robert Stewart, Earl of Strathearn, subsequently Robert II, King of Scots (1371–1390) as his second wife. Euphemia is sometimes incorrectly assigned as a daughter of Matilda, but this would have involved consanguinity in the 2nd and 3rd degrees which was not stated in the dispensation for her marriage to Robert Stewart.

Hugh and Margaret are often also assigned a daughter Janet, wife of Sir John de Monymusk. This has been found to be erroneous, as Janet was actually Janet de Barclay, daughter of Margaret de Graham by her 2nd husband, John de Barclay of Gartley. All received prestigious marriage partners, including to the earls of Buchan and Moray, to Maol Íosa IV, Earl of Strathearn and the future king Robert II.

== Death ==
He was killed along many other Scottish nobles at the Battle of Halidon Hill on 19 July 1333, and was succeeded by his son and successor, William.

== Bibliography ==
- Barrow, G.W.S., Robert Bruce and the Community of the Realm of Scotland, (Edinburgh, 1988)
- Sir James Balfour Paul, Scots Peerage, Vol. VII:234-237
- John P. Ravilious, The Ancestry of Euphemia, Countess of Ross: Heraldry as Genealogical Evidence, The Scottish Genealogist Vol. LV, No. 1 (March 2008), pp. 33–38

| Preceded by William II | Mormaer of Ross; 1323–1333 | Succeeded by William III |
