= Alexander Leslie, Earl of Ross =

Alexander Leslie, Earl of Ross (died 1402) was a Scottish nobleman. Born between 1367 and 1382, he was the son of Walter Leslie, Lord of Ross and Euphemia I, Countess of Ross. In around 1394, or not later than 1398, he became Earl of Ross and sometime before 1398 he married Isabel Stewart, daughter of Robert Stewart, Earl of Fife who became Robert Stewart, Duke of Albany. They had one child, Euphemia. He died at Dingwall, Scotland on 8 May 1402.

== Early life ==
Alexander Leslie was the son of Euphemia I, Countess of Ross and her husband, the far-travelled Walter Leslie, Lord of Ross. His exact date of birth is not known. He was born somewhere between 1367, the year following his parents' marriage, and 1382, the year of his father's death. When his father died in 1382 he would have been no more than an adolescent or teenager.

== The Wolf of Badenoch ==
Later in 1382 his mother, now a wealthy widow, remarried, to Alexander Stewart (the "Wolf of Badenoch"), son of King Robert II of Scotland. The marriage significantly undermined the prospect of the young Alexander's inheritance. The marriage of 1382, supported by King Robert, saw the transfer of control of the mormaerdom or earldom of Ross and the associated barony of King Edward to the east (the northern half of the defunct earldom of Buchan) from Euphemia's hand's into the hands of Alexander Stewart. Two days after the transfer, Alexander was made Earl of Buchan by the King.

Alexander received control of the earldom of Ross in liferent (i.e. for his lifetime), and any heirs to the marriage were entitled to inherit the lordships of Skye, Lewis and the thanages of Dingwall, Deskford and Glendowachy and other lands in other parts of Scotland which had been part of Euphemia's property.

Thus the young Alexander Leslie, even if he were to obtain the earldom eventually upon Stewart's death, was faced with a likelihood of being left with an earldom stripped of a large chunk of its most important assets. These actions by King Robert alienated the powerful Leslie-Lindsay kindred, a Lowland family who had entered the higher ranks of Scottish politics as favourites of King David II of Scotland. King Robert had also deprived this family of the exercise of the Justiciarship of Scotia. Later in 1382 (November), King Robert's chamberlain, son-in-law and favourite, John Lyon, thane (toiseach) of Glamis, was murdered by James Lindsay, lord of Crawford, head of the Leslie-Lindsay kindred and claimant to the lordship of Buchan. In 1384, Lindsay-Leslie and Douglas disaffection contributed to the coup by the king's son, John Stewart, earl of Carrick, who became Guardian (1384–88).

The Leslie-Lindsay kindred sought to protect Alexander Leslie's rights in Ross. However, this was difficult while Buchan remained in such a powerful position in the north. The guardianships of Carrick and then of Carrick's brother Robert Stewart, earl of Fife and Menteith (1388–93) were both supported by the Leslie-Lindsay kindred and both aimed against Buchan's power. Moreover, Buchan's nominal wife, Euphemia, herself came into the Leslie-Lindsay camp. In 1389, Euphemia, the countess of Ross, complained to the Pope that her marriage to Buchan was meaningless, as the latter was in fact more often with his mistress, Mairead inghean Eachainn. Pope Clement V annulled the marriage in late 1392, and ordered the restoration of her lands. With the firm support of the Fife guardianship, Euphemia and her son were able to re-establish their power in Ross. By the year 1394, Buchan's power in Ross seems to have disappeared and Countess Euphemia was once again granting charters from Dingwall Castle.

== Earl of Ross ==
Alexander succeeded his mother to the Earldom of Ross sometime between the later part of 1394 and 1398. The key point perhaps is the date of his mother's death. The date is not known, but fell somewhere between late 1394 and 1398. In the November of the latter year, he had granted some lands to his relative (either cousin or uncle) George Leslie of Rothes in exchange for the 200 merks he apparently needed to take the control of the earldom out of the crown's hands. He controlled the barony of Fitkill in Fife until in 1399, when he resigned this too (via King Robert III) to Rothes. Very little is otherwise known about his activities as earl.

== Family life ==
He had married Isabel, Robert Stewart, Duke of Albany's daughter sometime before 1398. They had only one child, Euphemia, a weak child who Albany persuaded to take the veil. She bequeathed her enormous estates not to her father's sister, but to her mother's half-brother, Albany's second son John (from his second wife), whom his father made Earl of Buchan in 1408. This too may have been engineered by Albany, who had designs on Ross.

== Death ==
According to the Cronicle of the Earlis of Ross (c. 9), Alexander Leslie, Earl of Ross, died at Dingwall on 8 May 1402. His widow remarried Sir Walter de Haliburton, Knt.

== Notes ==
Preceded by Euphemia I	Earl of Ross; 1394 x 1398–1402	Succeeded by Euphemia II
