= Donald of Islay, Lord of the Isles =

Lord of the Isles and chief of the Scottish Clan Donald

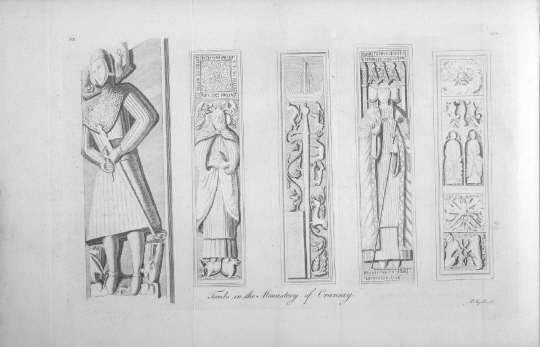
- 18th century illustration of some of the tombs of Oronsay Priory, founded by Donalds's father John sometime before 1358
- Predecessor: John of Islay, Lord of the Isles
- Successor: Alexander of Islay, Earl of Ross
- Born: Scotland
- Died: 1423; Islay, Scotland
- Spouse: Mary Leslie, Countess of Ross
- Issue: Alexander Macdonald, 10th Earl of Ross; Angus Macdonald; Anna Macdonald
- House: Clan Donald
- Father: John of Islay, Lord of the Isles
- Mother: Margaret of Scotland

Donald, Lord of the Isles (Scottish Gaelic: Dómhnall; died 1423), was the son and successor of John of Islay, Lord of the Isles and chief of Clan Donald. The Lordship of the Isles was based in and around the Scottish west-coast island of Islay, but under Donald's father had come to include most of the isles and the lands of Somerled, the King of the Isles in the 12th century, Donald's predecessor, including Morvern, Garmoran, Lochaber, Kintyre and Knapdale on the mainland.

Donald was the grandson of King Robert II of Scotland and first cousin of King Robert III; he took pride in his royal blood, even adopting the royal tressure to surround his coat of arms.

While it is customary to portray the Lords of the Isles as divorced from the mainstream of Scottish political life, and as representatives of a brand of lordship distinct from the rest of Scotland, this view obscures the fact that Donald was only one of many magnates who held large lordships with little interference from the crown in late 14th and early 15th century Scotland. The Douglas kindred of southern Scotland and the Albany Stewarts had similar roles to Donald.

== Early rule ==
Donald spent some of his first years as Lord of the Isles suppressing a revolt by his brother John Mór. John was Donald's younger brother, and resented his meagre inheritance. Although he was recognised as heir-apparent (tànaiste) until Donald produced a son, he only received patches of land in Kintyre and Islay. The rebellion initiated by the MacKinnons, including their chief, Niall and the "Green Abbot" of Iona, started in 1387 and went on into the 1390s. The MacKinnons and John obtained the support of the MacLean and MacLeod kindreds. However, John and the MacKinnons were defeated. The MacKinnon chief was hanged, the MacKinnon abbot was imprisoned for life on Iona. Eventually, John submitted to Donald, who forgave him. John Mór had fled to Ulster where he married Margery Bisset and became the Lord of Dunyvaig and the Glens. Like Donald, he was allied with the English kings, Richard II of England and Henry IV.

== Conflict with the Stewarts ==
Suppression of the revolt enabled Donald to turn his attention northwards and eastwards. Most of the area to the north and east of the Lordship, that is Skye, Ross, Badenoch and Urquhart, was under the control of Alexander Stewart, Earl of Buchan, famously known as the "Wolf of Badenoch". The Stewarts had been building up their power in the central Highlands and north of Scotland since the death of John Randolph, 3rd Earl of Moray in 1346. Alexander had acquired control of the lordship of Badenoch, the earldom of Buchan and the Justiciarship of Scotia. He had been appointed "Lieutenant of the North", giving him the flexibility to exercise total control over most of Scotland north of the mounth. Alexander was at once the de facto ruler of northern Scotland as well as how the crown itself exercised control.

However, there had been complaints over the activities of his caterans (war bands). More importantly, Alexander's position had become threatening not only to the crown, but also to Euphemia I, Countess of Ross, her son Alexander and the titular Dunbar Earl of Moray. Late in 1388, soon after becoming Guardian of the Kingdom, Robert Stewart, Earl of Fife (created Duke of Albany in 1398) deprived Alexander of the Justiciarship. The assault on Alexander's position continued into the 1390s. Donald and his brother Alexander of Lochaber were in a perfect position to benefit. In 1394, the latter entered a 17-year agreement with the Earl of Moray, taking over Alexander Stewart's role as "protector" of the wealthy comital and episcopal lands in the Moray lowlands. The MacDonalds were in possession of Urquhart Castle by the end of 1395, and had given control of the Duart Castle to Maclean of Duart.

The Guardian soon turned his hostility against Donald and his family. Alexander of Lochaber had been using his role as "protector" to further his own lordship, including granting episcopal lands to his military followers. In 1398, Robert Stewart (now Duke of Albany) was called upon to take action, but the well-prepared expedition in the end came to nothing. Lochaber continued his activities, and in a raid of 1402 burned the burgh of Elgin along with the manses of the canons belonging to Elgin Cathedral. For this, he was excommunicated by William Spynie, bishop of Moray. Later in the year Alexander visited Spynie to seek forgiveness and was thereafter absolved.

== The Earldom of Ross ==
Following the death of Alexander Leslie, Earl of Ross in 1402, Donald pressed the claims of his wife Mariota, Alexander Leslie's sister, to the possession of Ross. Donald attempted to gain control of the earldom. Sometime after 1405 but before 1411, Donald gained control of Dingwall Castle, the chief seat of the earldom and was welcomed to Ross by the people. In the year after the death of the nominal king, Robert III, Donald sent emissaries to England, to make contact with the heir of the Scottish throne, the captive and, as yet, uncrowned James Stewart. King Henry IV of England sent his own emissaries to Donald in the following year to negotiate an alliance against Albany.

With control over the principal seat of the earldom of Ross and support of the exiled heir to the Scottish throne, in 1411 Donald felt strong enough that he was in pursuit of a noble cause, so he marched an army of 10,000 Islesmen and Ross vassals against Albany's main northern ally, Alexander Stewart, Earl of Mar. At the Battle of Harlaw, Donald won a decisive victory, and thereafter returned to the western Highlands and Isles.

In the aftermath, Albany was able to retake Dingwall and seize control of Easter Ross. In 1415, the heir of Alexander Leslie, Euphemia II, resigned the earldom to Albany. Donald prepared for war and proclaimed himself "Lord of Ross". Although Albany appointed his own son John Stewart to the earldom, Donald's wife continued to regard herself as the rightful Countess.

Donald died in 1423 in Islay. He was succeeded by his son Alexander.who became Lord of the Isles and Earl of Ross.

== Marriage and children ==
He married Mariota Leslie of Ross. They had several children:

- Alexander Macdonald, 9th Earl of Ross d. 7 May 1449 whom married Elizabeth Seton, daughter of Alexander Seton, Lord Gordon and Elizabeth Gordon, Heiress of Gordon
- Angus, who became Bishop of the Isles
- Anna

== Fiction ==
The Strongest Heart, 2023, part of The Clan Donald Saga by Regan Walker

== Notes ==
Preceded by John	Lord of the Isles; 1386–1423	Succeeded by Alexander
