= John Stewart, Earl of Buchan =

14/15th-century Scottish army officer

John Stewart
- Earl of Buchan
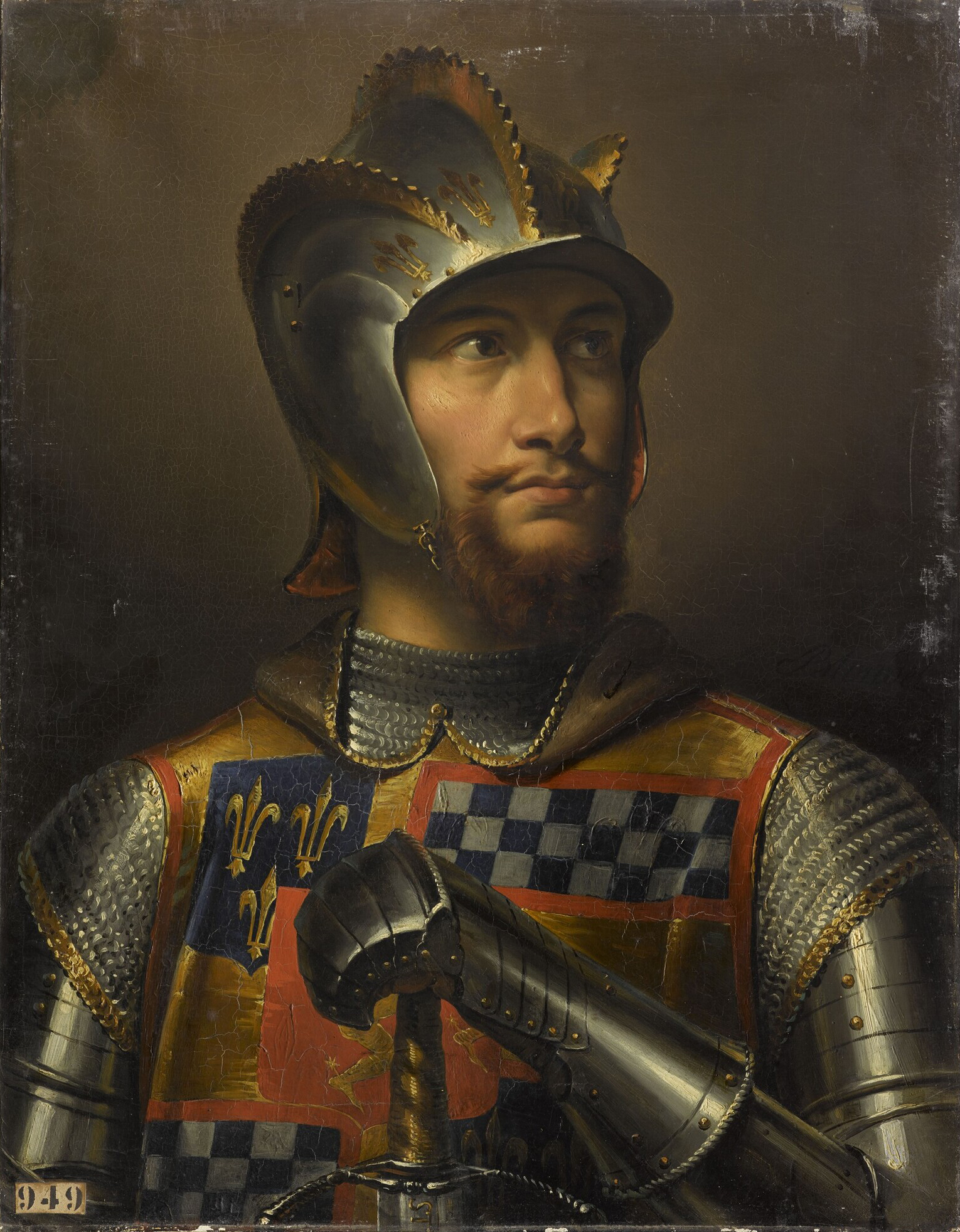
- 19th-century painting of Stewart
- Born: c. 1381; Scotland
- Died: 17 August 1424; Verneuil-sur-Avre, France
- Wars and battles: Hundred Years War; Battle of Bauge; Battle of Cravant (POW); Battle of Verneuil †
- Offices: Constable of France
- Noble family: House of Stuart
- Father: Robert Stewart, Duke of Albany
- Mother: Muriella Keith
- Military career
- Service years: 1419–1424
- Commands: Scottish Army, France, Hundred Years War.

Arms of John Stewart, 2nd Earl of Buchan

John Stewart, Earl of Buchan (c. 1381 – 17 August 1424) was a Scottish nobleman and soldier who fought alongside the Kingdom of France during the Hundred Years War. In 1419, he was sent to France by his father the Duke of Albany, Regent of Scotland, with a Scottish army of 6,000 men. Stewart led the combined Franco-Scottish army at the Battle of Baugé on 21 March 1421, where he comprehensively routed an English force under Thomas of Lancaster, Duke of Clarence.

However, two years later, Stewart was defeated and captured by an English force led by Thomas Montacute, 4th Earl of Salisbury at the Battle of Cravant in 1423. After the battle he was exchanged, and after his release in 1424 he was appointed Constable of France making him the effective Commander-in-Chief of the French army. On 17 August of that year, Buchan was killed in action fighting against English troops at the disastrous Battle of Verneuil, along with most of the Scottish troops in France. The battle led to the effective dissolution of the Scottish army in France.

== Early life ==
Stewart was born c.1381, the son of Robert Stewart, 1st Duke of Albany and his second wife Muriella Keith. He succeeded to the Earldom of Buchan sometime after the death of his uncle Alexander Stewart, Earl of Buchan (the Wolf of Badenoch). In 1406, with the capture of young King James I by Henry IV, the Duke of Albany became Regent of Scotland, making him the most powerful man in Scotland, king in all but name. John's father, Robert Stewart, Duke of Albany, was grandfather to Euphemia II, Countess of Ross and persuaded her to resign her rights to his son, despite the superior claim of Donald of Islay, Lord of the Isles. Stewart appeared as Earl of Ross for a short time. But his title was successfully challenged by Donald of Islay, Lord of the Isles, for his wife, Mariota, or Mary Leslie, Countess of Ross, and their son, Alexander, who succeeded Donald as Lord of the Isles, and held the additional titles of Earl of Ross and Justiciar of Scotia.

== Family ==
Stewart married Elizabeth Douglas (1385x1401–c.1451), daughter of Archibald Douglas, 4th Earl of Douglas. They had just one child, Margaret Stewart (before 1425–before 1461), who married George Seton, 3rd Lord Seton.

== Hundred Years War ==
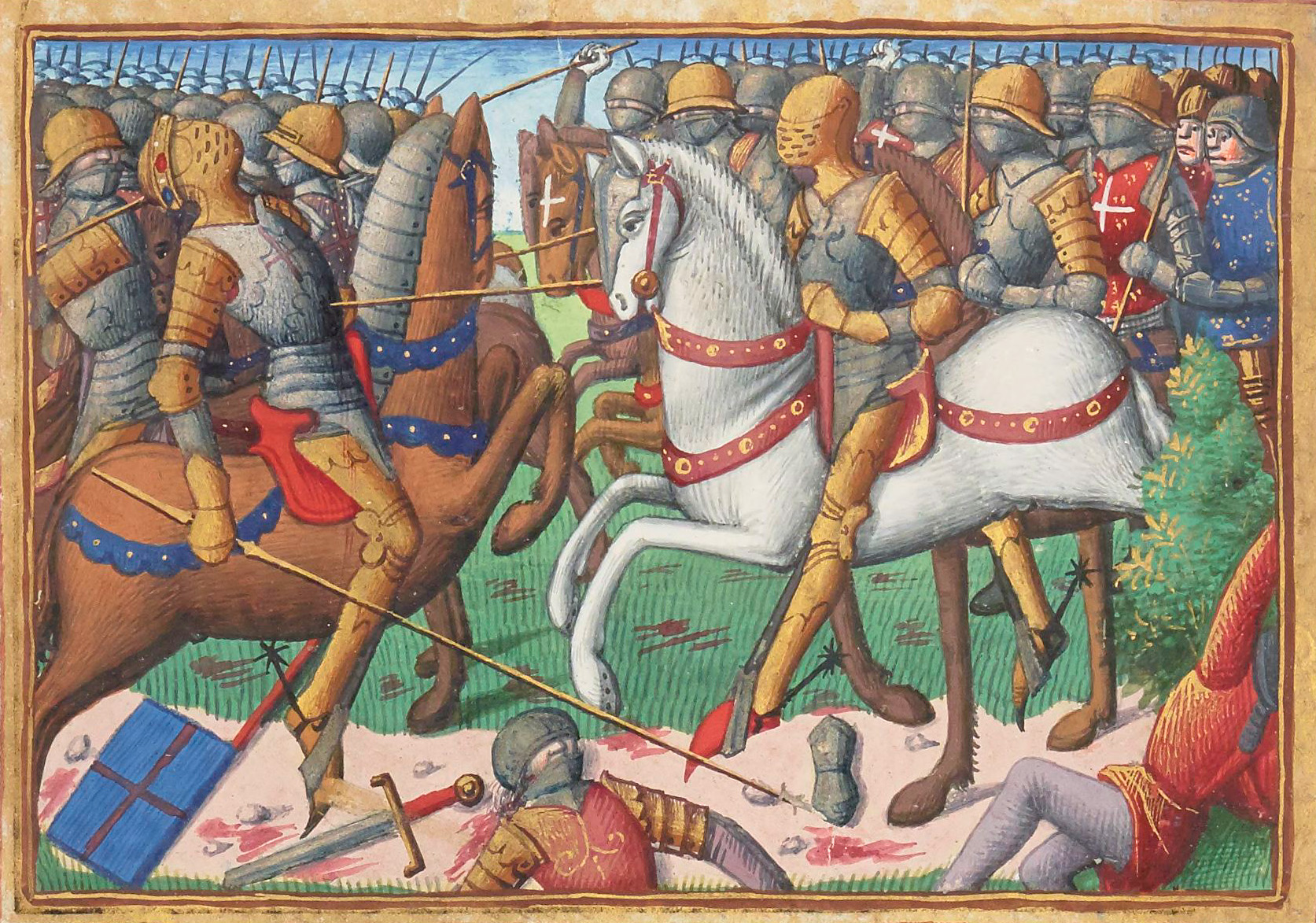
Battle of Bauge, 21 March 1421, where Stewart won a great victory over the English.

In 1419 Stewart's father sent him to France with an army of 6,000 men to fight in the Hundred Years' War, sailing to La Rochelle in a Spanish fleet. At first Stewart's soldiers prove unpopular amongst the French, owing to their fondness for food and drink, but success in battle would make the Scottish army extremely welcome in France. Stewart and Gilbert Motier de La Fayette were commanders of the combined Franco-Scottish army at the battle of Baugé on 21 March 1421, where he won a great victory over the English, the first major setback suffered by the English armies during the Hundred Years War since the reign of Richard II. Buchan had been appointed by the Dauphin to defend Anjou against the Duke of Clarence, brother of King Henry V. Clarence was among the first to fall, wounded by Sir John Swinton and dispatched by Sir Alexander Buchanon's battle axe.

Baugé was a huge boost to the morale of the Scottish and French, proving that the English were not invincible. On hearing of the Franco-Scottish victory, Pope Martin V remarked that "the Scots are well-known as an antidote to the English."

=== Capture and ransom ===
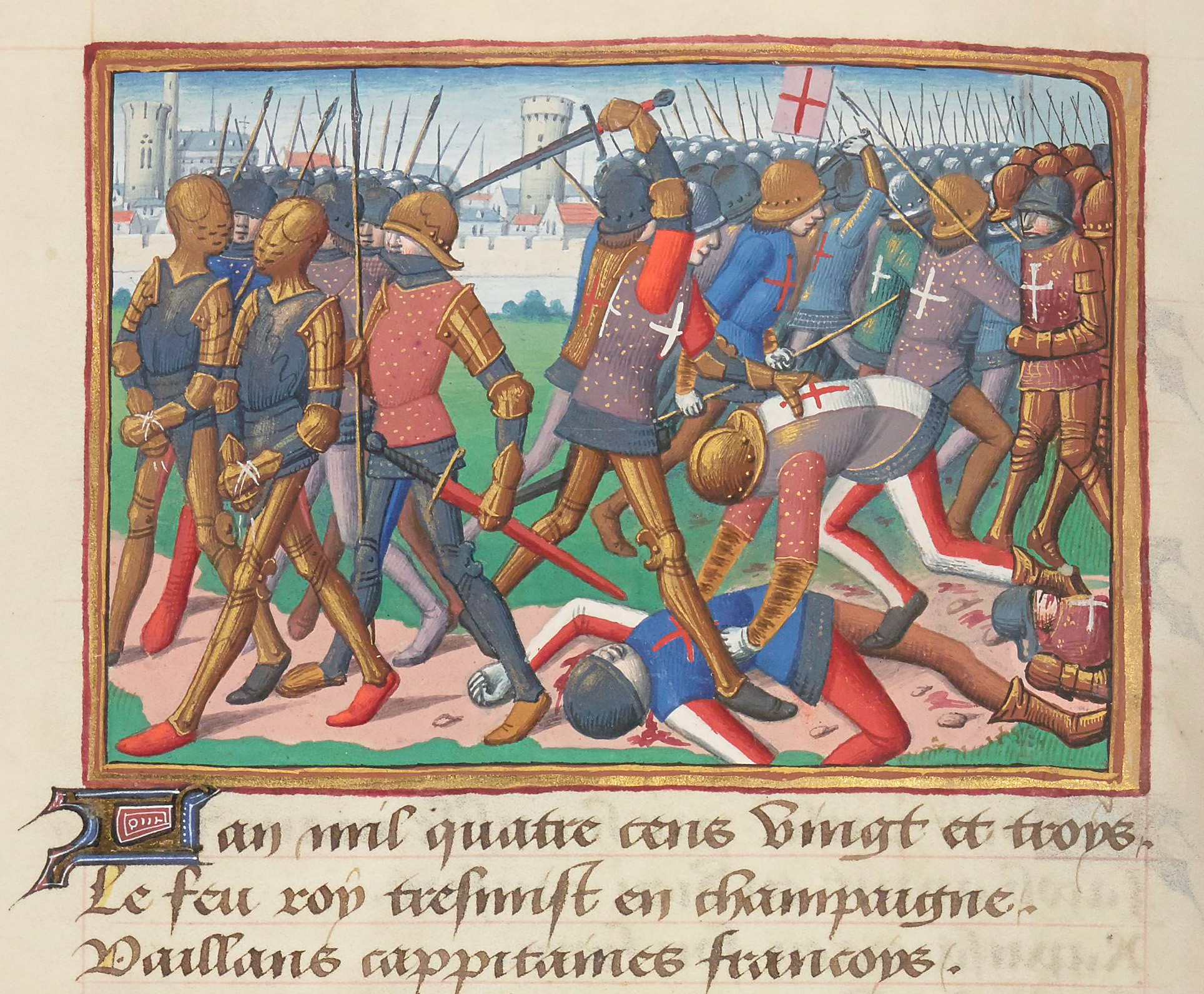
The Battle of Cravant in 1423, where Buchan was defeated and captured.

In the early summer of 1423, at the Battle of Cravant, Buchan found himself in command of a mixed force of French and Scots soldiers. Buchan confronted a combined Anglo-Burgundian army at the village of Cravant in Burgundy, at a bridge and ford on the banks of the river Yonne, a left-bank tributary of the Seine, southeast of Auxerre. Buchan's forces outnumbered the English and Burgundians on the opposite bank more than two to one. The combined English and Burgundian forces, numbering some 4,000 men, were led by Thomas Montacute, 4th Earl of Salisbury.

For three hours the forces stared each other down, neither willing to attempt an opposed river crossing. Salisbury finally took the initiative and his army began to cross the waist-high river, some 50 metres wide, under a covering hail of arrows from English archers. Meanwhile, another English force under Baron Willoughby de Eresby forced a passage through the Scots across the narrow bridge and divided the Dauphin's army.

When the French ranks began to withdraw, the Scots refused to flee and were cut down by the hundreds. Over 3,000 of them fell at the bridgehead or along the riverbanks, and over 2,000 prisoners were taken, including the Earl of Buchan and the commander of the Dauphin's forces, the Comte de Vendôme. The Dauphin's forces retreated to the Loire, leaving many prisoners behind and over 6,000 dead. Buchan may well have considered himself lucky to be taken alive. King Henry V of England had re-asserted the English claim of suzerainty over Scotland, and therefore executed Scots prisoners of war on the grounds that they were traitors, fighting against their own King.

After the battle Buchan was exchanged, and after his release in 1424 he was appointed Constable of France making him the effective Commander-in-Chief of the French army. To recover from the losses sustained at Cravant, fresh troops under the Earl of Douglas were dispatched from Scotland to France.

=== Battle of Verneuil ===
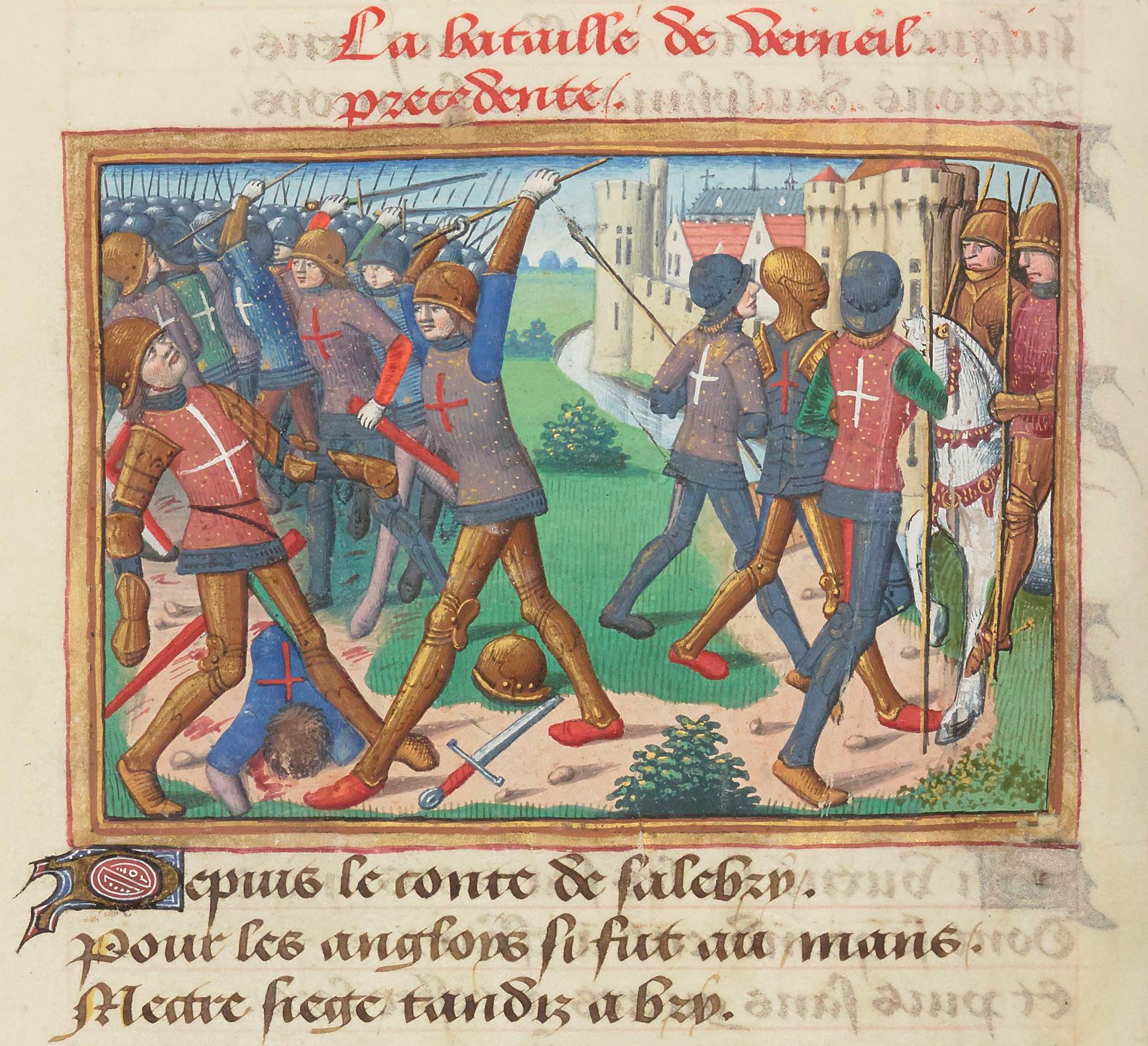
The Battle of Verneuil, where Buchan was killed in 1424.

However, despite these welcome reinforcements, disaster would soon overtake Stewart and his Scottish army. On 17 August 1424 Buchan was killed at the Battle of Verneuil, along with most of the Scottish troops in France. Buchan and his generals unwisely chose to face the English army, led by John of Lancaster, 1st Duke of Bedford in open battle. Bedford's army attacked aggressively from the south to take the Scots in the rear. Abandoned by their French allies and almost completely surrounded, the Scots made a ferocious last stand, but were overwhelmed.

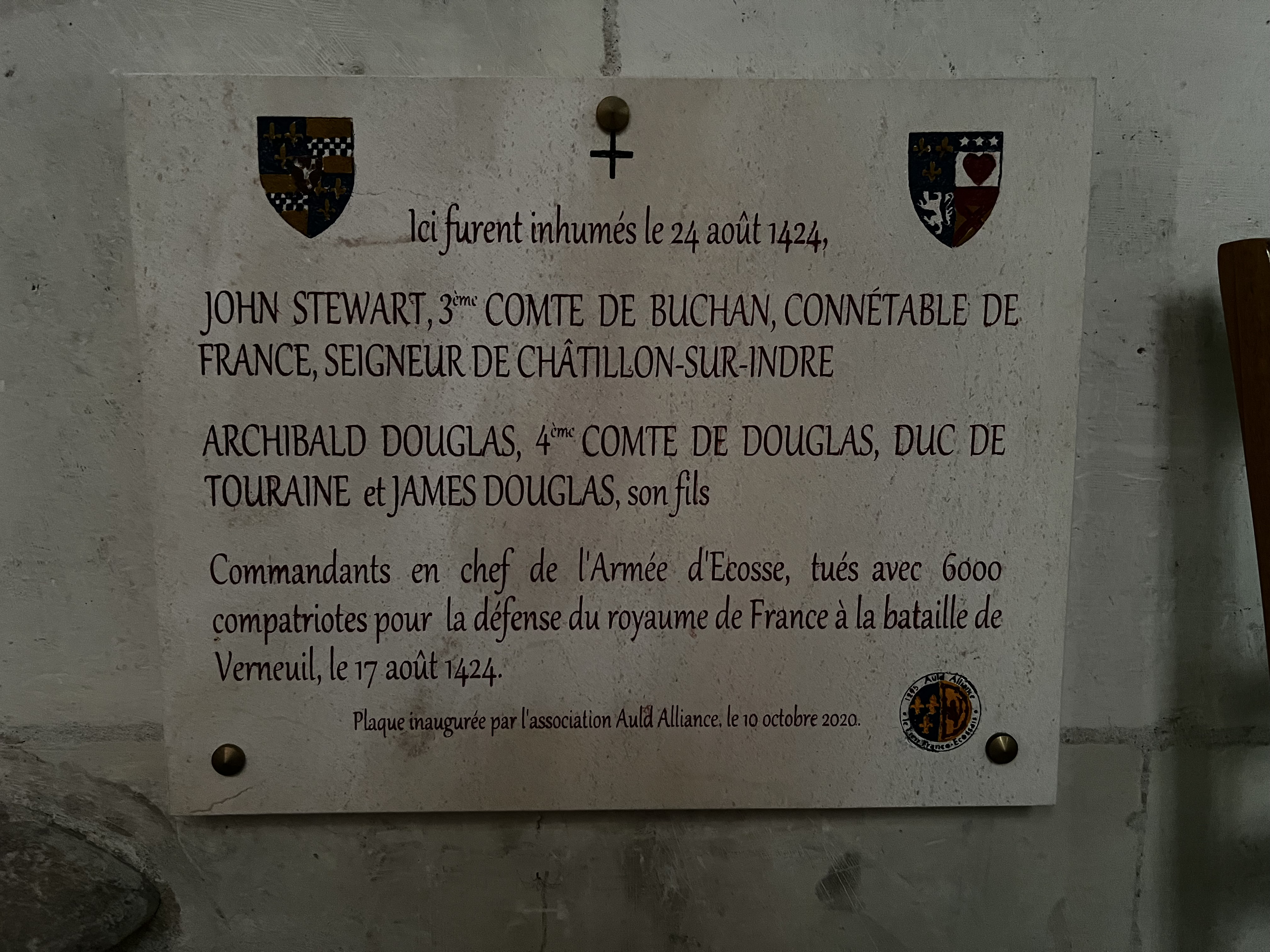
Memorial in St Gaiten Cathedral, Tours

Verneuil was one of the bloodiest battles of the Hundred Years War, described by the English as a second Agincourt. Altogether some 6000 allied troops were killed, including 4000 Scots. The English lost 1600 men, an unusually high figure for them, far greater than their losses at Agincourt, indicating the ferocity of the fight. The Earl of Douglas fought on the losing side for the last time, joined in death by Buchan.

== Legacy ==
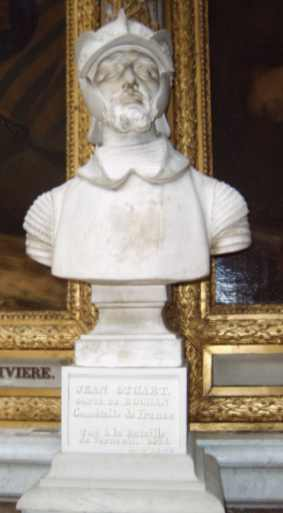
Bust of John Stewart, Earl of Buchan in the Galerie des Batailles du Château de Versailles.

Stewart's death had important consequences for domestic politics in Scotland. His death fatally weakened the position of his brother Murdoch Stewart, Duke of Albany, who was soon afterwards arrested and executed by James I of Scotland, leading to the almost complete ruin of the Albany Stewarts.

A bust of Stewart is displayed to this day in the Galerie des Batailles, in the Château de Versailles, opened in 1837.

== See also ==
- Constable of France
- Auld Alliance

== Notes ==
Peerage of Scotland
Preceded by Alexander Stewart	Earl of Buchan; 1405–1424	Succeeded by Murdoch Stewart
