= English invasion of Scotland (1400) =

English invasion of Scotland of August 1400
- Part of Anglo-Scottish border conflicts
Date	14–29 August 1400
Location	Berwickshire & Lothian
Result	Militarily inconclusive English withdrawal

Belligerents
Kingdom of Scotland	Kingdom of England

Commanders and leaders
Duke of Rothesay; Duke of Albany	Henry IV; Earl of March

Strength
Unknown	~13,000

Casualties and losses
Unknown	Unknown

The English invasion of Scotland in August 1400 was the first military campaign undertaken by Henry IV of England after deposing the previous king, his cousin Richard II. Henry IV urgently wanted to defend the Anglo-Scottish border, and to overcome his predecessor's legacy of failed military campaigns. A successful campaign against the Scots would also heighten his own image as a strong ruler and reinforce the new regime.

A large army was assembled slowly and marched into Scotland. Henry was aided by divisions within the Scottish nobility, and won over George, Earl of March, who renounced his allegiance to Robert III of Scotland. However, once in Scotland, Henry's army remained camped near Leith (northeast of Edinburgh) where it could maintain contact with its supply fleet. No pitched battle was ever attempted, nor did the King besiege Scotland's capital, Edinburgh or its Castle. Henry's army left at the end of August after only a brief stay. The campaign ultimately accomplished little except to deplete further the Crown's coffers, and was criticised by contemporary chroniclers. Modern historians have also found little to commend the expedition. It was the last time an English king led an army into Scotland.

== Background ==
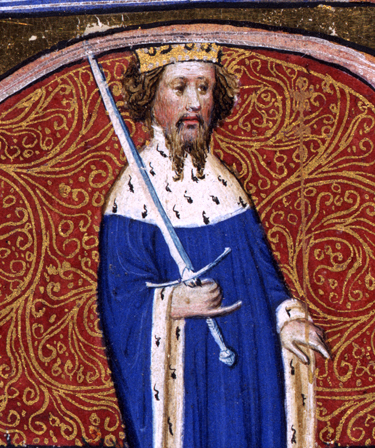
Henry IV of England as depicted on a contemporary manuscript

War between England and Scotland had started under King Edward I. By the 1370s, cross-border raids and fighting had become the norm in Anglo-Scottish relations. This generally involved Scottish incursions over the border and English attempts to repel them. The last years of Richard II's reign had seen several truces between the countries. However, the 1399 coup d'état, in which he was deposed by his cousin, Henry Bolingbroke, Earl of Derby, presented the Scots with the opportunity to regain land between the River Tweed and the Solway Firth. As the medievalist Chris Given-Wilson puts it, "England's confusion was Scotland's opportunity", and in May 1399—on Henry's coronation day—Wark Castle, in Northumberland was destroyed by one such Scottish raid. The damage inflicted and the ransoms imposed amounted to over £2,000 (equivalent to £1,903,800 in 2025); another raid in the west reached as far south as Penrith, Cumbria. So Henry's invasion had its roots in the earliest period of the reign, and became entwined in the formation of the new regime: the latest truce with Scotland had expired on the same day Richard abdicated the throne.

Something of a tradition had by then been established, of newly-crowned kings of England launching military campaigns at the beginning of their reigns. Edward III had done so in the first year of his reign and then again on the commencement of his personal rule in 1327 and 1332, respectively. Richard II invaded Scotland immediately on reaching his majority, and Henry V was to do so within three years of acceding to the crown. The historian Anne Curry and colleagues argue that these campaigns were "enforcing ... royal will and testing loyalty towards a newly established regime" as well as obtaining material strategic goals. They also instilled national unity following the upheaval caused by Richard's deposition. The presence of Henry IV's sons, Henry of Monmouth and Thomas, alongside him on the campaign was also to be heavy with significance. Curry et alia explain:

Although the princes were clearly too young to exercise effective command over large bodies of soldiers, there could not have been a better way of emphasising to both the English and their Scottish enemy the stability, and indeed virility, of the new regime than the King leading out an army alongside his two eldest sons, in succession to the childless Richard II.

In his proclamations, Henry emphasised his own Scottish ancestry as well as the claim to the Scottish throne advanced by Edward I in the 13th century. This, suggests Given-Wilson, might indicate that "whether or not he truly believed that he could unite Britain under his kingship, Henry was not insensible to the possibilities which history presented".

== Planning ==
Also, on Monday 10 November, the Earl of Northumberland, Constable of England, by command of the King explained to all the lords temporal that, as had been explained to them previously, the King intended to make war on his Scottish enemies, and that, since it was said by some people that this plan had been conceived on the advice and at the instigation of the said Earl, and of the Earl of Westmorland Marshal of England, these same earls denied that this was the case, and requested of the King that it might please him to explain his own wishes concerning this matter. Whereupon, our same lord the King explained in his own words in full parliament how God in his grace had sent him to this realm, and had placed him in the estate in which he is at present for its salvation: and therefore he intended, entirely of his own volition, to mount this expedition. Whereupon he commanded the said Earl of Northumberland to put the question of this plan to all the lords, to have their advice on it; they, questioned individually on it, agreed to this plan, that the King should mount the said expedition, in the name of God, considering the great wickedness and rebellion of the Scots, without provocation or offence on his part. Whereupon the King himself, most graciously thanking the said lords in his own words, said to them that he would never refrain from committing his body and his blood to this expedition, or to any other for the salvation of his realm, if God gave him life ....

— Contemporary record of Henry's speech to the Lords at the October 1399 parliament, now held at The National Archives, Kew, Chancery: Parliament Roll, C 65/62 mem. 14

Although Henry probably preferred to maintain peaceful relations with Scotland, much of the English nobility were keen on a pre-emptive strike. In particular, the Percys— the Earl of Northumberland and his son Henry Percy (known as Hotspur)—who were Wardens of the East and West March, saw a Scottish war as an opportunity for their own aggrandisement. A successful invasion would both provide an opportunity for plunder and protect the northern flank of their estates, which experienced constant raiding. Indeed, some contemporaries believed that the invasion was actually "conceived on the advice and at the instigation of" the Percys, as the Parliament Roll put it. The King felt forced to deny this, in person, to the House of Lords during the November 1399 parliament. The historian A. L. Brown suggests that this indicates the keen interest the King took: as his own personal plan, "it meant a lot to him, and that it had met with criticism", to which he felt obliged to respond vigorously. It was in his interest to show that he was no man's puppet. The House of Commons, however, petitioned Henry not to go north, asking that he stay "in the middle of the realm" and send others if necessary. The King ignored them and pledged to fulfil this vow before God. At around the same time, Henry received a letter from King Robert III of Scotland, which referred to Henry as "Duke of Lancaster, Earl of Derby and Lord High Steward" rather than King of England. This refusal to acknowledge Henry's claim to the throne was a direct personal insult, and probably fuelled his enthusiasm for a Scottish war. (Note: Given-Wilson says that, because of age and infirmity—Robert III was by now over 60—"it was not the Scottish king who decided policy", but his aggressive son David, Duke of Rothesay, brother Robert, Duke of Albany and Archibald, Earl of Douglas. Sumption has described Robert as "affable but infirm". The letter could also have been a riposte for the fact that, for many years English letters to the Scottish kings also refused to acknowledge them as such, choosing terms such as consanguineus noster and adversarius noster over rex Scottorum.)

=== Scottish divisions ===
Probably as persuasive to Henry and his lords were the visible divisions within the Scottish nobility. By April 1398, King Robert faced severe criticism in many parts of his kingdom. Suffering from periodic bouts of illness, he was accused of failing to maintain order. At a general council held at Perth in January 1399, Robert had been forced to surrender power to David, Duke of Rothesay, his son and heir, who was appointed regent.

George Dunbar, Earl of March felt that he had been betrayed by Rothesay's uncle, Robert Stewart, Duke of Albany, over the proposed marriage of Dunbar's daughter to Rothesay. The marriage never came to pass, even though Dunbar and the lady had been living together sometime. Rothesay married Mary Douglas, the daughter of Dunbar's rival on the march, Archibald, Earl of Douglas. Dunbar, jilted and his honour "gretly wrangit", appealed to Henry for assistance. Dunbar complained that he had been

Greatly wronged by the Duke of Rothesay, the which spoused my daughter and now, against his obliging to me made by his letter and his seal and against the law of holy Kirk, spouses another wife, as it is said.

Already known as "one of the finest soldiers of his age [and] until now an implacable enemy" of England, says Given-Wilson, Henry sent him a gift of £100 (equivalent to £95,200 in 2025) in December. Two months later, Dunbar travelled to London and pledged allegiance to Henry. In Scotland, his estates and properties were seized by the Crown.

Arms of George Dunbar, Earl of March

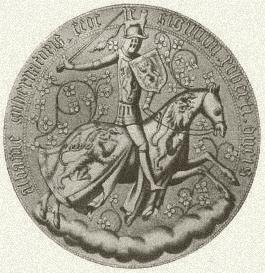
The seal of Robert, Duke of Albany as Regent of Scotland

Dunbar's involvement was important because, not only was he a major figure in Scottish politics in his own right, but he also had extensive experience in northern warfare. His secession forced the Scottish government to adopt a more conciliatory approach; a letter of 14 March addressed Henry as "our dear cousin of England". Dunbar was a power in eastern Scotland. In the west, Henry found another ally in Donald of Islay, Lord of the Isles. Both Donald and his brother John had been bitter enemies of the Dukes of Rothesay and Albany since the latter pair had led a punitive raid into Donald and John's Lochaber and Islay estates in 1398.

=== Composition and logistics ===
The English army was not raised through feudal obligation—as Richard II had unsuccessfully attempted in 1385—or the more recent bastard feudal mechanism of indenture. Instead, the King called upon not only his closest tenants-in-chief, but anyone in receipt of royal patronage. Henry's father, John of Gaunt, Duke of Lancaster, had been the richest man in the kingdom after the king, and also possessed the largest retinue. Henry's accession had therefore merged the two largest affinities in the kingdom into a socially and geographically broad-based retinencia regis, or personal retinue. This gave Henry more potential patronage than previous monarchs; this was the basis for his army in 1400. It has been estimated at around 13,000 men—1,771 men-at-arms and 11,314 archers—of which 800 men-at-arms and 2000 archers came directly from the Royal Household. These were, for example, the retinues of John Norbury, the Lord High Treasurer, Thomas Tutbury, Keeper of the Wardrobe and Robert Litton, its controller. Comprising over 230 retinues, this army was "one of the largest raised in late medieval England", say Curry et al. While it was smaller than the massive army assembled in 1345 (that which fought Crécy), it was larger than most mustered for French service. "Only the 1385 campaign to Scotland can compare", argue Curry et al, at around 13,764 soldiers. Henry's force was larger than Edward III's French army in 1359 (around 10,000 strong), while that of Henry V's Agincourt campaign in 1415 was between 10,000 and 12,000 men. Later in the century, Edward IV's army which invaded France in 1475 amounted to 11,451 men. Only the campaigns of 1346 and 1347 saw armies greater than 12,000 men.

The English nobility had a historic martial duty to follow the King into war. Seven of the eleven adult earls and dukes of England attended, and Henry's sons both brought small forces. (Note: Absentees included the Duke of York, who was elderly, the Earl of Warwick who was discredited, the Earl of Devon, who was blind and the Earl of Worcester who had been left in charge of government in Westminster.) The largest contingent was Westmorland's, although 1,000 of his 1,200 men were archers. (Note: Archers were both cheaper and easier to recruit, and the importance of raising the army speedily accounts for their supermajority in numbers. Henry may have personally favoured archers too, as during his 1390 expedition to Lithuania with the Teutonic knights, one of the victories during the otherwise unsuccessful Siege of Vilnius was recorded as being due in part to "Henry of Lancaster, who had many good bowmen". The proportion of archers in the 1400 expeditionary force was the largest of any late-medieval army.) The army's social composition was broader than that of its predecessor, in part because the recent Epiphany Rising had thinned the number of peers the King could call upon, (Note: By five: the earls of Salisbury, Huntingdon, Kent, with barons Lumley and Despenser, were all lynched and beheaded by pro-Henrician mobs—"clowns and workmen", according to Usk—soon after the conspiracy was discovered.) and many knights were required to stay south and guard against Ricardian-inspired revanchism. Participation was encouraged by a veiled threat to withdraw patronage (for example, annuities) for those who failed to attend. (Note: Ultimately, over 110 crown annuitants led retinues.) Also joining the campaign was Archambaud, Count of Périgord, who had been deposed from his French titles the previous year and was now living in English exile, along with the picaresque Gascon (and "minor chivalric celebrity", says his biographer, Simon Walker) Jenico Dartasso. Henry commanded an experienced army; many knights and senior captains had served in Ireland under Richard II in the 1390s or with Henry's father in France and Spain; several Household men had served with Henry in Lithuania on his 1390 crusade—as part of the Lithuanian Civil War—fighting at the Siege of Vilnius. Some men's military pedigrees went back to Edward III's 1369 campaign. For wages, men-at-arms received one shilling a day (Note: According to the UK National Archives, this is worth approximately £30, and was approximately twice the daily wage for a skilled tradesman.) and archers half that, while captains and leaders do not appear to have been paid a higher rate.

While the army attacked on land, the English fleet patrolled the east coast of Scotland, both to blockade Scottish trade and to resupply the army when required. At least three naval convoys were sent from London and the Humber, the first of which delivered 100 long tons (220,000 pounds) of flour and 10 long tons (22,000 pounds) of sea salt to Newcastle upon Tyne, Lindisfarne and Berwick for revictualling the army. One of these convoys comprised 20 ships from the Cinque Ports. Smaller armed convoys sailed from East Anglia, for instance, from Orwell, but details of this provisioning are now unknown; privateers from King's Lynn acted in a protective role. Five barges from the King's own personal fleet also transported goods, food and cash.

== Campaign ==
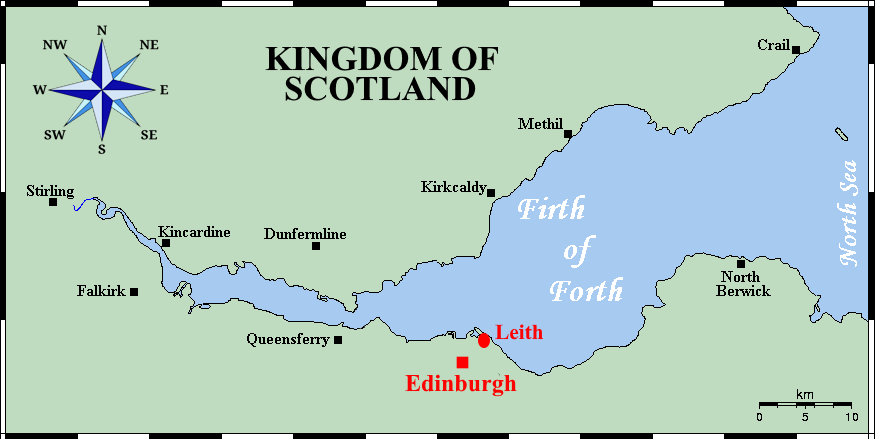
Map showing Leith to the northeast of Edinburgh

=== Approaching Scotland ===
Although Henry had announced the planned invasion at the October 1399 parliament, he did not intend a winter campaign. Instead, he continued to hold quasi-negotiations "in which he must have felt the Scots were profoundly irritating", says Brown, as the Scottish delegation avoided substantive discussion in favour of arguing about the meeting place. No progress was made. The Commons remained wary of a forthcoming war, and, since extravagance had been a major complaint against Henry's predecessor, Henry was probably constrained in requesting a parliamentary subsidy, or tax. In fact, Parliament seems to have considered a possible French invasion the most pressing issue. However, Scottish prevarication during the negotiations ("or rather manoeuvres", comments Brown) confirmed Henry's view that only an armed campaign would bring long-term peace to the border, and he began appointing commissions of array and even sending spies over the border.

The King—accompanied by Dunbar—summoned his Duchy of Lancaster retainers to muster at York "furnished and arrayed for war ... each man as his estate requires", their writs demanded, for 24 June; they in turn brought their feudal retinues. Now, with an English invasion imminent, the Scots attempted to reopen negotiations. Their ambassadors arrived at York to meet the King around 26 June; however, they returned to Scotland within two weeks. Their basis for peace was a return to the status quo ante of the 1328 Treaty of Edinburgh–Northampton, and they demanded the conference take place on the previous border which England did not recognise; the Scottish terms were wholly unacceptable to the English.

The English army was assembled by the end of June. It had rested in Clipstone, Nottinghamshire, on 14 June and Pontefract a week later. It was in York by 4 July and Northallerton on the 18th, finally arriving in Newcastle seven days later. Its slow progress was due to the gradual arrival of army supplies. There was much delay: the King's own tents, for example, were not dispatched from Westminster until halfway through July. Henry was well aware of the delays these preparations would cause his campaign. Before reaching the Scottish border, the muster was met by Henry Percy, Earl of Northumberland, in his aspect as Constable of England and Ralph Neville, Earl of Westmorland, the Earl Marshal. (Note: These were the two great military officers of the medieval English Crown.) The leaders of each retinue present were then paid a lump sum to later distribute in wages to their troops. Following this, the army eventually left York on 25 July and reached Newcastle four days later. It continued to be plagued by shortages of supplies, particularly food, of which more had to be requested before even leaving York. As the campaign progressed, bad weather exacerbated the situation. This became an increasingly important consideration, and probably contributed to the short duration of the expedition.

=== Invasion ===
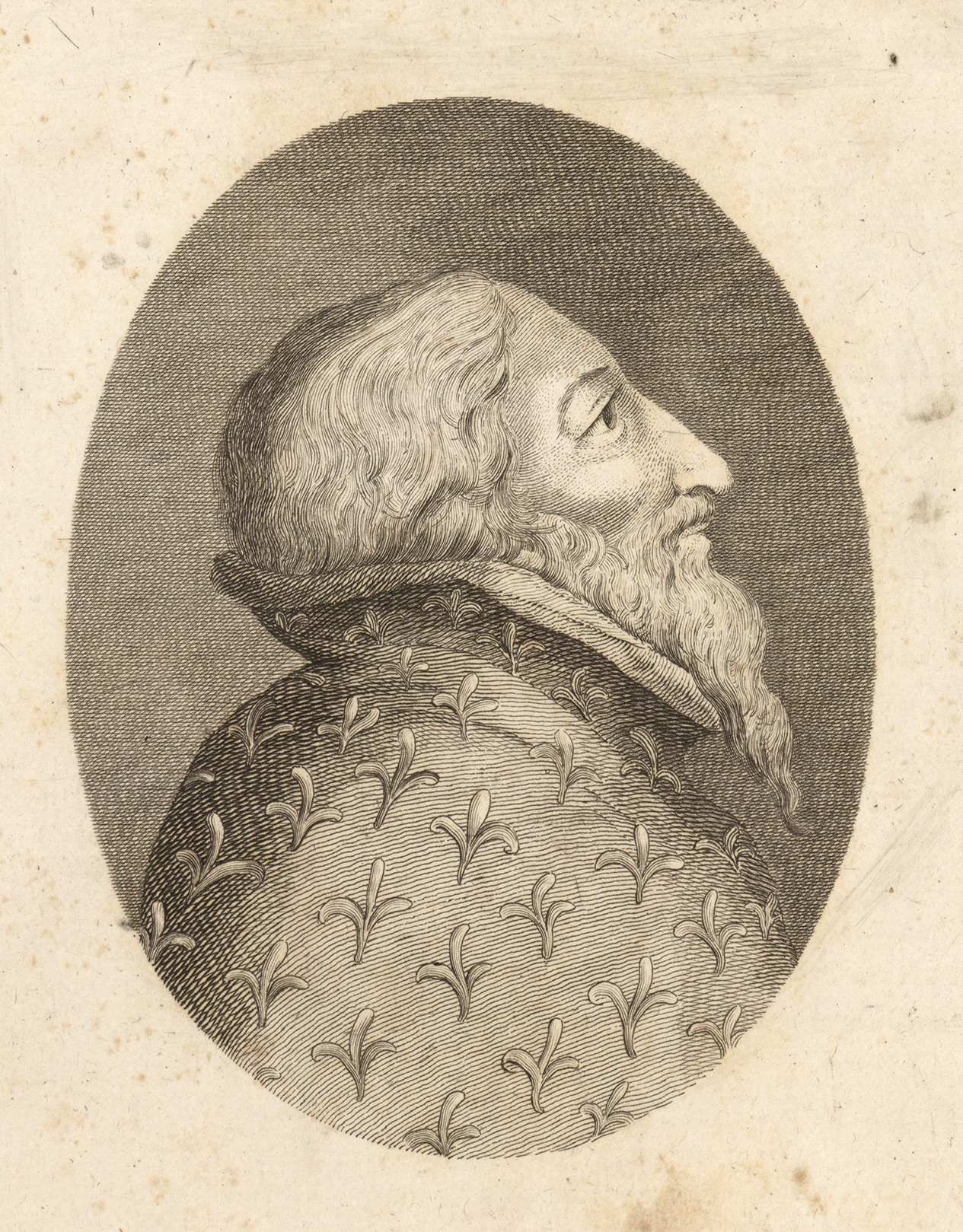
Henry Percy, Earl of Northumberland, Constable of England, from an 18th-century engraving

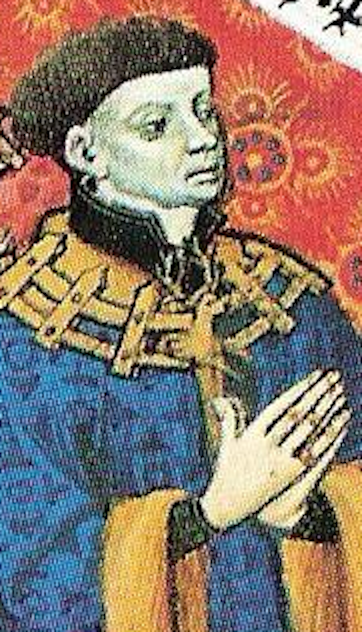
Ralph Neville, Earl of Westmorland, Earl Marshal, from the early-15th-century Neville Book of Hours

While in Newcastle, Dunbar withdrew his fealty to Robert, who, Dunbar said, "pretends himself King of Scotland". The army crossed the border on 14 August; as they did, Henry invoked the spirit of Brutus, the legendary—albeit still evocative—first King of Albion, in their cause. Henry took care not to ravage or pillage the countryside on their march through Berwickshire and Lothian. This was in marked contrast to previous expeditions, and Given-Wilson compares it specifically to the "devastation wreaked" in Richard's 1385 campaign (on which Henry, when Earl of Derby, may have served). This reflected Dunbar's presence in the English army, as his estates were centred on the region, and Henry was keen to encourage Dunbar's tenantry to join him in his new allegiance. When they arrived at Dunbar's chief stronghold, it was firmly garrisoned against them by the Douglases. The downside of this strategy was that it prevented the English from living off the land as medieval armies traditionally did. Henry intended to force either a pitched battle or a chevauchée―a punitive raid characterised by pillaging and brutality, intended to both inflict economic destruction and damage morale. Either, it was hoped, would force the Scots to submit. The English army was large enough to deter an outright attack by the Scots, who offered no resistance as the invaders made a rapid advance through Haddington on 15 August. However, the defectors Henry expected en masse from Dunbar's tenants also failed to materialise.

Details of Henry's activities in Scotland are sparse. In Brown's words, "the evidence is again too fragmentary to justify more than impressions". It is known, though, that in the event Henry's army never progressed further than Leith, a port on the southern coast of the Firth of Forth, about 4 miles (6.4 km) northeast of Edinburgh. Here, it could keep in close contact with the supporting fleet. Henry took a personal interest in his convoys, at one point even instructing that two Scottish fishermen fishing in the Firth of Forth were to be paid £2 for their (unspecified) assistance. Henry chose not to besiege Edinburgh Castle, within which the Duke of Rothesay was ensconced. Rothesay refused Henry's demands that he perform fealty to the English King; by now, Brown says, the campaign had been reduced to a war of words. Although Rothesay refused to negotiate, he did offer Henry—whom he addressed as "our adversary of England"—a trial by combat, whereby two or three hundred knights on each side would mêlée. Henry ignored the offer—"as was customary with such gestures", note Curry et al.—and reiterated his demand for homage. There was a final negotiation at a cross between Edinburgh and Leith, "at which the Scots spoke softly and promised to consider Henry's claim", comments Brown. With these vague promises, Henry had to be content. Very little, if any, actual fighting had taken place; it is unclear if the Scots raised their own army. Nor were any English knights made. (Note: It was common for knights to be dubbed on a military campaign, both before and after battle. Robert Bruce knighted James Douglas and Walter Stewart prior to the Battle of Bannockburn in 1314, as was James Douglas, son of Archibald before the Battle of Verneuil in 1424, in order to both bolster their confidence and emphasise their new responsibilities. Knights could also be made during the battle itself, as happened to several men during the 1402 Battle of Homildon Hill. However, by the 14th century, such knightings—or dubbings—were increasingly occurring after the battle, which, military historian David Potter suggests, indicates that the honour was increasingly viewed as less "a rite of initiation of youth [to] one of recognition and reward for the distinguished". Battlefield knightings were in sharp contrasty to the older traditional—and far more more lengthier—collected chivalric rituals, argues Potter, of the "bath, veillée, remise du cingulum, remise d'épcrons etc".) By 22 August the army's naval provisioning was likely proving less than adequate, as on that day 16 ports from Southampton to Liverpool, and other across the Irish Sea, were instructed to raise supplies for the army in Scotland. By 29 August, the expeditionary force had returned to Newcastle; popular opinion had been unimpressed with Henry's efforts.

Less than two months after Henry's departure, the Scots launched punishing raids into Northumberland, and in November, Douglas penetrated as far as Bamburgh.

== Aftermath ==
The English Crown had been in dire financial straits before the campaign had even begun; (Note: Henry's first parliament had not granted him any new taxes, or subsidies, merely making the now-traditional renewal of the customs.) by the time it was over, the situation had worsened considerably. The campaign cost at least £10,000 (equivalent to £9,519,000 in 2025), but had yielded nothing in booty or ransoms. (Note: To put this amount into context, in the early 15th century, the Earl Marshal, Ralph, Earl of Westmorland, had an annual income approximated between £2,500 (equivalent to £2,500,000 in 2025) and £3,000 (equivalent to £3,000,000 in 2025), while that of Henry Percy, Earl of Northumberland's has been assessed at £2,825 (equivalent to £2,900,000 in 2025).) Henry's need to pay his army―the merchant sailors' wages alone were £500 (equivalent to £475,900 in 2025)—required raising loans, many of which were not to be repaid for another two years. Brown asks, "one wonders what those who had lent money thought of the way their money had been spent". Lack of funds had constrained the campaign from the beginning; it had never been financially viable to keep the army in the field for much more than 20 days. With the Crown now a few thousand pounds further in debt, a parliament was summoned for York. Before either further finance could be raised or the parliament assembled, the Glyndŵr Rising began in Wales. This would continue for the rest of Henry's reign. In the north, far from proving a positive influence, Dunbar's defection to the English Crown exacerbated tensions, and cross-border violence increased. Henry may have felt himself deceived by the Scots' final promises: two years later, one of the Scottish delegates was captured, and Henry accused him in parliament of only achieving an English withdrawal "par pluseurs blanches paroles et bealx promesses" ("by blandishments and pretty promises"). The army that Henry IV headed in June 1400 was to be the last Scottish campaign led by an English king in person. It was also the last time Henry went to Scotland; his son was never to, while his grandson only did so as a refugee following his own deposition over sixty years later.

== Assessment ==
Contemporary observers condemned Henry's lacklustre campaign. Welsh chronicler Adam of Usk, for example, moaned that the "large and splendid army [Henry took] to Scotland to curb the depredations of the Scots" was under permanent attack by guerrilla forces who were thereby "doing us more harm than we did them". Likewise, the Scotichronicon suggested that "nothing worthy of remembrance was done" by their enemies.

The medievalist John Sadler has described this expedition as "like so many of its predecessors, fail[ing] to yield any significant results", neither forcing the Scots to battle nor making any major territorial gains. Brown, too, has described the campaign as "utterly futile", and as reflecting poorly on Henry personally:

All these dealings suggest that Henry was somewhat naive. He had over-reacted to a situation which does not seem suddenly to have become more serious ... He behaved like an honourable but inexperienced man, conscious of his kingly dignity and duty, anxious to be firm but reasonable, to succeed where Richard II had failed and with the old-fashioned belief that a campaign could bring decisive results. The Scots had made him look foolish.

Sadler has attributed the Scottish success in part to their reliance on a Fabian strategy to wear out the English while avoiding direct confrontation. According to Jonathon Sumption, the campaign dominated the early years of Henry's reign, yet left the border even less secure than it had been. It allowed Dunbar's bitter enemies, the Douglases, to consolidate their power in southeastern Scotland while undermining the traditional mechanisms of border arbitration. Given-Wilson argues that the expedition was intended to demonstrate Henry's greater commitment to the common weal, particularly in Northern England. More recently, Curry et al. have argued that the 1400 campaign demonstrates that Henry felt the need to impose his will on the nobility by leading them to war, but more, that he was able to do so, and they willingly followed him despite the recent rebellion. It was a successful illustration of the breadth and strength of the King's retinue, but it was the campaign's territorial, political and dynastic failure that drew disparaging comment from contemporaries, comment which Henry's reputation failed to surmount.
