= Gilbert Kymer =

English dean and physician (died 1463)

Gilbert Kymer (died 1463) was Dean of Salisbury Cathedral, Chancellor of Oxford University, and a physician.

Kymer was educated at the University of Oxford. He was a proctor of the university (1412–13) and principal of Hart Hall, Oxford (1412–14). He was twice chancellor of Oxford University.

In 1423, Kymer attempted to found a conjoint college of surgeons and physicians with John Somerset and Thomas Morstede. The plans for this collapsed in November 1424. In 1427, Kymer became Dean of Wimborne Minster (in Dorset). In 1449, he became Dean of Salisbury (in Wiltshire), where he occupied Leaden Hall. He was the physician in the household of Humphrey of Lancaster, 1st Duke of Gloucester. He attended King Henry VI as a physician in 1455.

Academic offices
Preceded by Thomas Chase	Chancellor of the University of Oxford; 1431–1434	Succeeded by Thomas Bourchier
Preceded by Robert Thwaits	Chancellor of the University of Oxford; 1447–1453	Succeeded by George Neville
