= Thomas Morstede =

Medieval English surgeon (c. 1411–1450)

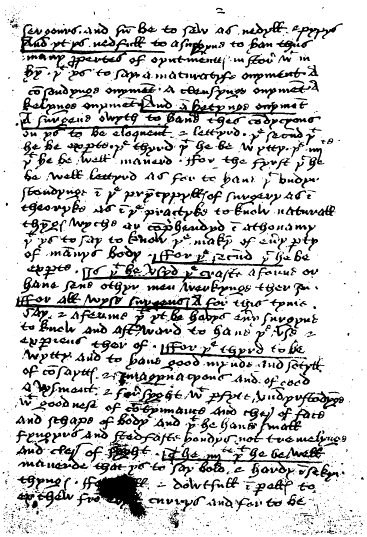
- Original manuscript of Morstede's 1446 A Fair Book of Surgery.
- Died: 20 April 1450; Church of St. Olave, Old Jewry
- Occupation: Royal Surgeon
- Spouse(s): Juliana Michell, Elizabeth Michell

Thomas Morstede (fl. c. 1411–1450) was an esquire and English surgeon who served the three successive kings, Henry IV, Henry V and Henry VI of England. He was described by Theodore Beck as the "most eminent English surgeon of the fifteenth century".

== Family ==
Thomas Morstede was the son of Thomas and Alianora Morstede from Betchworth, Surrey. After the death of his first wife, Juliana, Morstede married Elizabeth Michell in 1431. She was the widow of his wealthy friend, William Fitzharry, and the daughter of John Michell. John Michell had been an alderman since 1413, a sheriff from 1414 to 1415 and a Lord Mayor in 1424–45. As well as this, he had been a Member of Parliament for London on six occasions and thus an influential father-in-law to Morstede.

There are many other people with whom Morstede had valuable friendships during his lifetime. One notable example is in the gift of "10 marks sterling, his English book bound with two latitudinibus and all his instruments of surgery" which Morstede left to his apprentice, Robert Bryttende.

Although he was married twice, the absence of children in Morstede's will has led R.R. James to assume he did not have any.

== Career ==
Morstede apprenticed under the surgeon Thomas Dayron in London. He first entered the service of Henry IV in 1410 and was appointed as the King's Surgeon in 1411.

By 1413 Morstede was appointed Searcher of the Vessels and was responsible for collecting Henry V's dues from ships travelling on the Thames. This office had previously been held by John Bradmore. Thomas Morstede and William Bradwardyne were also asked to "raise, equip and lead" a company of surgeons during the Agincourt Campaign of 1415. They were therefore contracted to serve the king abroad.

In 1423 and working under Henry VI, Morstede, along with physicians John Somerset and Gilbert Kymer, attempted to found a conjoint college of physicians and surgeons. The college was founded "for the better education and control of physicians and surgeons in the city and its liberties". Despite this, the college only lasted a year and collapsed in November 1424. By 1426 Morstede became known as "Master Thomas" and was sheriff in the city of London.

== Legacy ==
Morstede's will is dated 20 April 1450 and his body was buried in the church of St. Olave in Old Jewry in London.

Morstede's legacy remains in many historical works. A manuscript titled A Fair Book of Surgery, which has been dated to 1446, making it one of the earliest surgical works written in English, has been attributed to Morstede. In the manuscript, Morstede states that surgeons should be skilled in both the theory and practice of surgery, and should conduct themselves graciously and show mercy to the poor.

S.J. Lang has questioned Morstede's authorship of the manuscript, as it has direct parallels with John Bradmore's Philomena. Such similarities include a description of an incident at the Battle of Shrewsbury. Here, Henry Prince of Wales was struck with an arrow in the left-hand side of his face. The arrowhead became lodged and an instrument illustrated in both Morstede and Bradmore's manuscripts was devised to remove it.
