= List of earls in the reign of Henry IV of England =

This is a list of Earls (Suo jure or jure uxoris) during the reign of Henry IV of England who reigned from 1399 to 1413.

The period of tenure as Earl is given after the name and title(s) of each individual, including any period of minority.

Earl of Arundel

- Thomas Fitzalan, 12th Earl of Arundel, 10th Earl of Surrey (1399–1415)

Earl of Devon

- Edward de Courtenay, 3rd Earl of Devon (1377–1419)

Earl of Dorset (Second creation)

- Thomas Beaufort, Duke of Exeter, Earl of Dorset (1411-1426)

Earl of Huntingdon (Fourth creation)

- John Holland, 1st Duke of Exeter, 1st Earl of Huntingdon (1388–1400)

Earl of Kent (Sixth creation)

- Thomas Holland, 1st Duke of Surrey, 3rd Earl of Kent (1397–1400)
- Edmund Holland, 4th Earl of Kent (1400–1408)

Earl of March

- Edmund Mortimer, 5th Earl of March (1398–1425)

Earl of Norfolk (Third creation)

- Thomas de Mowbray, 4th Earl of Norfolk, 2nd Earl of Nottingham (1399–1405)
- John Mowbray, 2nd Duke of Norfolk, 5th Earl of Norfolk, 3rd Earl of Nottingham (1405–1432)

Earl of Nottingham (Second creation)

- Thomas de Mowbray, 4th Earl of Norfolk, 2nd Earl of Nottingham (1399–1405)
- John Mowbray, 2nd Duke of Norfolk, 5th Earl of Norfolk, 3rd Earl of Nottingham (1405–1432)

Earl of Oxford

- Aubrey de Vere, 10th Earl of Oxford (1393–1400)
- Richard de Vere, 11th Earl of Oxford (1400–1417)

Earl of Richmond (Second creation restored)

- Arthur III, Duke of Brittany, Earl of Richmond (1393–1425)

Earl of Salisbury (Second creation)

- John Montagu, 3rd Earl of Salisbury (1397–1400)
- Thomas Montagu, 4th Earl of Salisbury(1400–1428)

Earl of Somerset (Second creation)

- John Beaufort, 1st Earl of Somerset (1397–1410)
- Henry Beaufort, 2nd Earl of Somerset (1410–1418)

Earl of Stafford

- Edmund Stafford, 5th Earl of Stafford (1395–1403)
- Humphrey Stafford, 1st Duke of Buckingham, 6th Earl of Stafford (1403–1460)

Earl of Suffolk (Third creation)

- Michael de la Pole, 2nd Earl of Suffolk (1398–1399) (1399–1415)

Earl of Surrey

- Thomas Fitzalan, 12th Earl of Arundel, 10th Earl of Surrey (1400–1415)

Earl of Warwick

- Thomas Beauchamp, 12th Earl of Warwick (1369–1401)
- Richard Beauchamp, 13th Earl of Warwick (1401–1439)

Earl of Westmorland

- Ralph Neville, 1st Earl of Westmorland (1397–1425)

== Sources ==
Ellis, Geoffrey. (1963) Earldoms in Fee: A Study in Peerage Law and History. London: The Saint Catherine Press, Limited.
