= John Somerset =

Member of the Parliament of England

John Somerset or Somerseth (died 1454) was an English physician and administrator.

He was born in London and attended Oxford University, but moved to Cambridge University to avoid the plague, graduating master in 1418.

Thomas Beaufort, Duke of Exeter, appointed him master of the grammar school at Bury St Edmunds and just five years later he was named as a governor of a proposed joint college of medicine and surgery in London. Somerset worked on the college with Thomas Morstede and Gilbert Kymer until its plans collapsed in November 1424. In 1427 he was found a place in the royal household as physician and tutor to the young Henry VI. In 1442 he became the first medical man to sit in parliament, as a knight of the shire for Middlesex. In 1439 he was appointed Chancellor of the Exchequer and Warden of the Royal Mint. Somerset's tenure as Chancellor and Warden occurred during the Great Bullion Famine and the Great Slump in England.

After 1450 he was out of favour, with Parliament demanding his removal from court as an undesirable influence.

He died intestate on 4 June 1454, leaving no children.
