= Henry IV of England =

King of England from 1399 to 1413

Henry IV
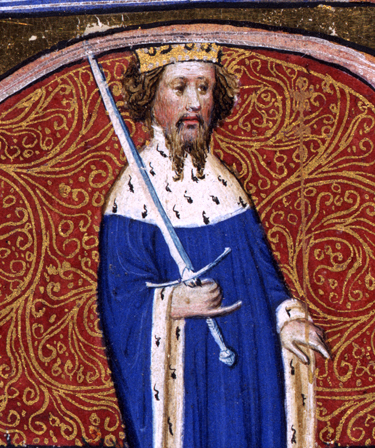
- Illuminated miniature, c. 1402

King of England
- Reign: 30 September 1399 – 20 March 1413
- Coronation: 13 October 1399
- Predecessor: Richard II
- Successor: Henry V
- Born: c. April 1367; Bolingbroke Castle, Lincolnshire, England
- Died: 20 March 1413 (aged 45); Jerusalem Chamber, Westminster, England
- Cause of death: Stroke
- Burial: Canterbury Cathedral, Kent, England
- Spouses: Mary de Bohun (m. 1381; died 1394); Joan of Navarre (m. 1403)
- Issue more...: Henry V, King of England; Thomas, Duke of Clarence; John, Duke of Bedford; Humphrey, Duke of Gloucester; Blanche, Countess Palatine; Philippa, Queen of Denmark, Norway and Sweden
- House: Lancaster
- Father: John of Gaunt
- Mother: Blanche of Lancaster

Henry IV (c. April 1367 – 20 March 1413), also known as Henry Bolingbroke (having been born at Bolingbroke Castle), was King of England from 1399 to 1413, Lord of Ireland and duke of Aquitaine. Henry was the son of John of Gaunt, Duke of Lancaster, and a grandson of King Edward III.

When Henry came of age, he was involved in the 1388 revolt of the Lords Appellant against his first cousin, King Richard II. Henry was later exiled from England in 1397. After Henry's father died in 1399, Richard blocked Henry's inheritance to the holdings of the House of Lancaster. So, Henry rallied Lancastrian supporters, imprisoned Richard II and formally deposed him, usurping the throne. These actions later contributed to dynastic disputes in the Wars of the Roses (1455–1487).

Henry was the first English ruler whose mother tongue was English (rather than French) since the Norman Conquest, over 300 years earlier. He was also the first monarch to come from the House of Lancaster. As king, he faced a number of rebellions, most seriously those of Owain Glyndŵr, the last Welshman to claim the title of Prince of Wales, and the English knight Henry Percy (Hotspur), who was killed in the Battle of Shrewsbury in 1403. Henry IV had six children from his first marriage to Mary de Bohun, while his second marriage to Joan of Navarre produced no surviving children. Henry and Mary's eldest son, Henry of Monmouth, assumed the reins of government in 1410 as the king's health worsened. Henry IV died in 1413, and his son succeeded him as Henry V.

== Early life ==
Henry was born at Bolingbroke Castle, in Lincolnshire, to John of Gaunt and Blanche of Lancaster. His epithet "Bolingbroke" was derived from his birthplace. Gaunt was the third surviving son of King Edward III. Blanche was the daughter of the wealthy royal politician and nobleman Henry, Duke of Lancaster. Gaunt enjoyed a position of considerable influence during much of the reign of his own nephew, King Richard II. Henry's elder sisters were Philippa, Queen of Portugal, and Elizabeth, Duchess of Exeter. He also had five younger half-siblings: a sister, Catherine, later Queen of Castile, born of John of Gaunt's second marriage to Constance of Castile and four children born to Gaunt's mistress, Katherine Swynford. Swynford was originally the governess to Henry's sisters and later became his father's third wife. Her children were later legitimised and were given the surname Beaufort.

Henry's relationship with his stepmother Katherine Swynford was amicable, but his relationship with the Beauforts varied. In his youth, he seems to have been close to all of them, but rivalries with Henry and Thomas Beaufort caused trouble after 1406. Ralph Neville, 4th Baron Neville, married Henry's half-sister Joan Beaufort. Neville remained one of his strongest supporters, and so did his eldest half-brother John Beaufort, even though Henry revoked Richard II's grant to John of a marquessate. Katherine Swynford's son from her first marriage, Thomas, was another loyal companion. Thomas Swynford was Constable of Pontefract Castle, where Richard II is said to have died.

One of Gaunt's esquires, Thomas Burton, was appointed Henry's tutor in December 1374, and a Gascon named William Montendre was made his instructor in military matters in 1376. It was likely Hugh Herle who taught Henry to read and write in English and French and some Latin as well; Herle served as Henry's chaplain for many years. By 1381–1382, Henry is recorded riding, hunting, and travelling with his father, as well as jousting and observing official events. He later became an active and highly successful jouster. He was besieged with King Richard and others in the Tower of London during the Peasants' Revolt in 1381 and narrowly escaped being murdered when the rebels stormed the tower. He was saved by a man named John Ferrour of Southwark, who participated in the Epiphany Rising against Henry, by then king of England, nearly twenty years later and was pardoned.

Henry had a close relationship with his father, but he did not participate much in public affairs while Gaunt was present in England. He accompanied Gaunt to negotiations with the French in Calais in November 1383. He took part in Richard's Scottish campaign with his father's forces in 1385, and he may have also served in an earlier incursion into Scotland by Gaunt. He was summoned to parliament for the first time in October 1385.

In his youth, Henry joined crusading expeditions; contemporaries remarked that he "never lost a battle", and John Gower described him as "full of knighthood and all grace".

== Conflict at court ==
=== Relationship with Richard II ===
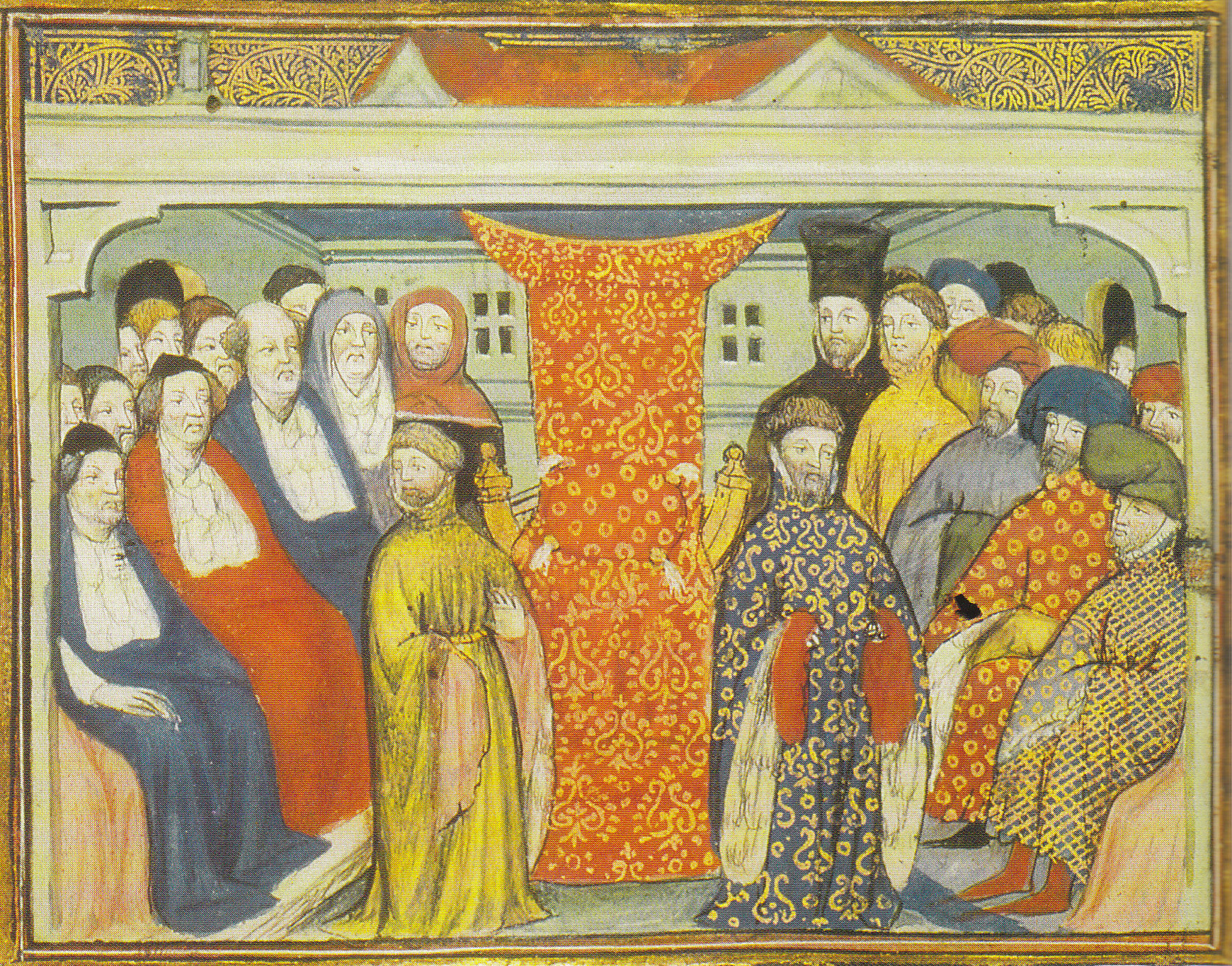
Henry of Bolingbroke, flanked by the lords spiritual and temporal, claims the throne in 1399. From a contemporary manuscript, British Library, Harleian Collection

Henry experienced a more inconsistent relationship with King Richard II than his father had. First cousins and childhood playmates, they were admitted together as knights of the Order of the Garter in 1377, but Henry participated in the Lords Appellants' rebellion against the king in 1387. After regaining power, Richard did not punish Henry, although he did execute or exile many of the other rebellious barons. In fact, Richard elevated Henry from Earl of Derby to Duke of Hereford.

Henry spent all of 1390 on a "reise", which were annual crusading expeditions organized by the Teutonic Order that attracted knights from all over Europe, who would serve for one winter-campaign as volunteers and then return home. Henry was supporting the unsuccessful siege of Vilnius (capital of the Grand Duchy of Lithuania) by Teutonic Knights as one such volunteer, together with a retinue of 70 to 80 household knights. During this campaign, he bought captured Lithuanian women and children and took them back to Königsberg to be converted, even though Lithuanians had already been baptised by Polish priests for a decade by then.

Henry's second expedition to Lithuania in 1392 illustrates the financial benefits to the Order of these guest crusaders. His small army consisted of over 100 men, including longbow archers and six minstrels, at a total cost to the Lancastrian purse of £4,360. Despite the efforts of Henry and his English crusaders, two years of attacks on Vilnius proved fruitless. In 1392–93 Henry undertook a pilgrimage to Jerusalem, where he made offerings at the Holy Sepulchre and at the Mount of Olives. Later he vowed to lead a crusade to "free Jerusalem from the infidel", but he died before this could be accomplished.

The relationship between Henry and Richard had a second crisis. In 1398, a remark about Richard's rule by Thomas de Mowbray, 1st Duke of Norfolk, was interpreted as treason by Henry, who reported it to the king. The two dukes agreed to undergo a duel of honour (called by Richard) at Gosford Green near Caludon Castle, Mowbray's home in Coventry. Yet before the duel could take place, Richard decided to banish Henry from the kingdom (with the approval of Henry's father, John of Gaunt), although it is unknown where he spent his exile, to avoid further bloodshed. Mowbray was exiled for life.

John of Gaunt died in February 1399. Without explanation, Richard cancelled the legal documents that would have allowed Henry to inherit Gaunt's land automatically. Instead, Henry would be required to ask Richard for the lands.

== Accession ==
After some hesitation, Henry met the exiled Thomas Arundel, former archbishop of Canterbury, who had lost his position because of his involvement with the Lords Appellant. Sailing from Boulogne, Henry and Arundel returned to England while Richard was on a military campaign in Ireland. With Arundel as his advisor, Henry began a military campaign, confiscating land from those who opposed him and ordering his soldiers to destroy much of Cheshire. Henry initially announced that he intended to reclaim his rights as Duke of Lancaster, though he quickly gained enough power and support to have himself declared King Henry IV, imprison Richard (who died in prison, most probably forcibly starved to death), and bypass Richard's heir-presumptive, Edmund de Mortimer, 5th Earl of March.

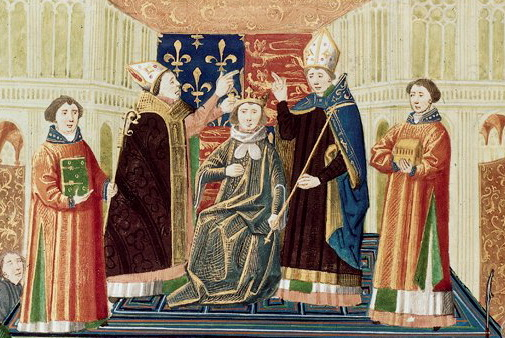
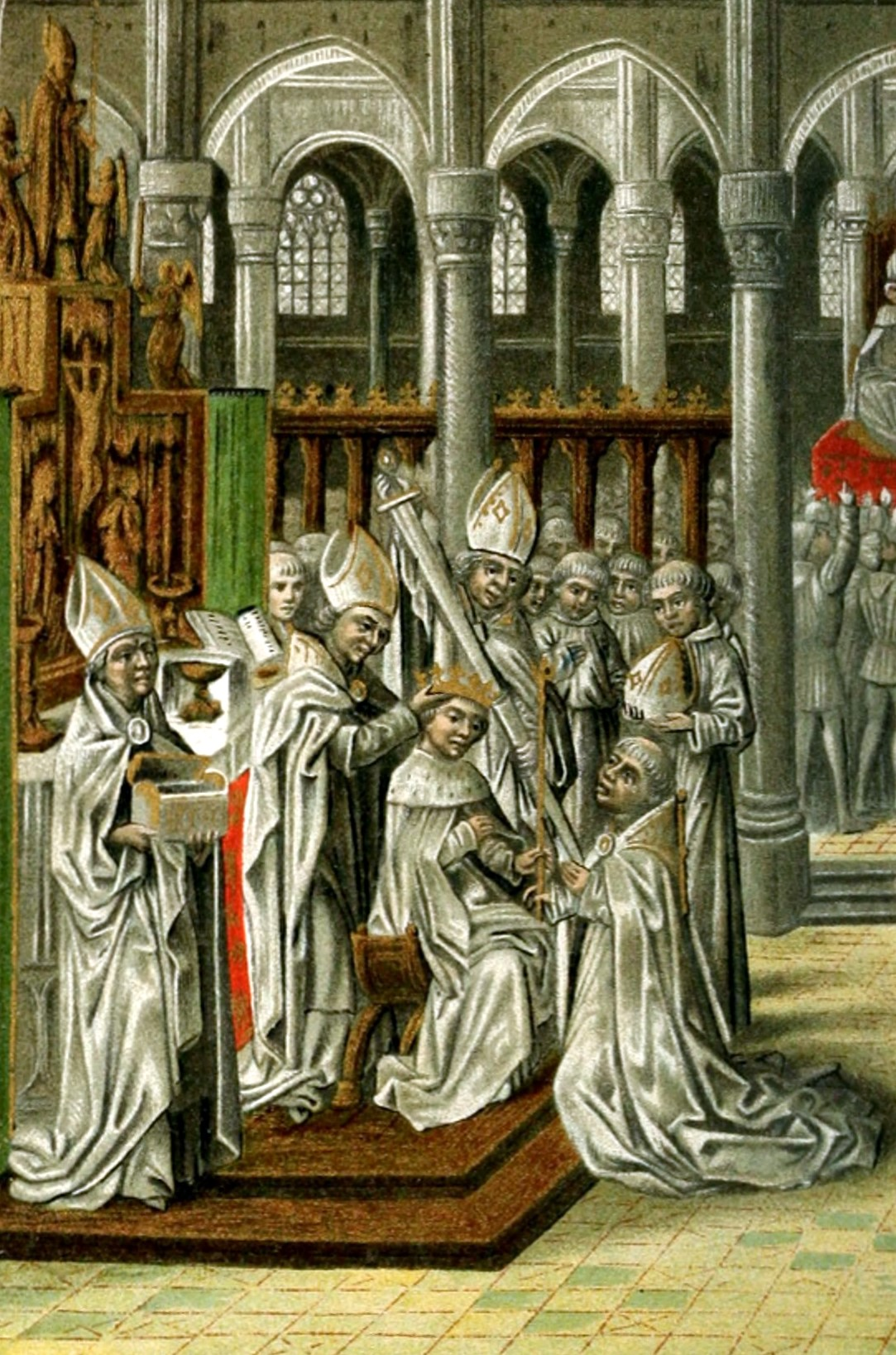
Coronation of Henry IV (left) The coronation of Henry IV of England, from a 15th century manuscript of Jean Froissart's Chronicles (right)

Henry's 13 October 1399 coronation at Westminster Abbey may have been the first time since the Norman Conquest that the monarch made an address in English. Henry was also the first king to be anointed with the Virgin Mary's sacred oils.

In January 1400, Henry quashed the Epiphany Rising, a rebellion by Richard's supporters who plotted to assassinate him. Henry was forewarned and raised an army in London, at which the conspirators fled. They were apprehended and executed without trial.

In August 1400, urgently wanting to defend the Anglo-Scottish border, and to overcome his predecessor's legacy of failed military campaigns, Henry invaded Scotland. A large army was assembled slowly and marched into Scotland. Not only was no pitched battle ever attempted, but the King did not try to besiege Scotland's capital, Edinburgh. Henry's army left at the end of the summer after only a brief stay, mostly camped near Leith (near Edinburgh) where it could maintain contact with its supply fleet. The campaign ultimately accomplished little except to deplete further the king's coffers, and is historically notable only for being the last one led by an English king on Scottish soil.

== Reign ==
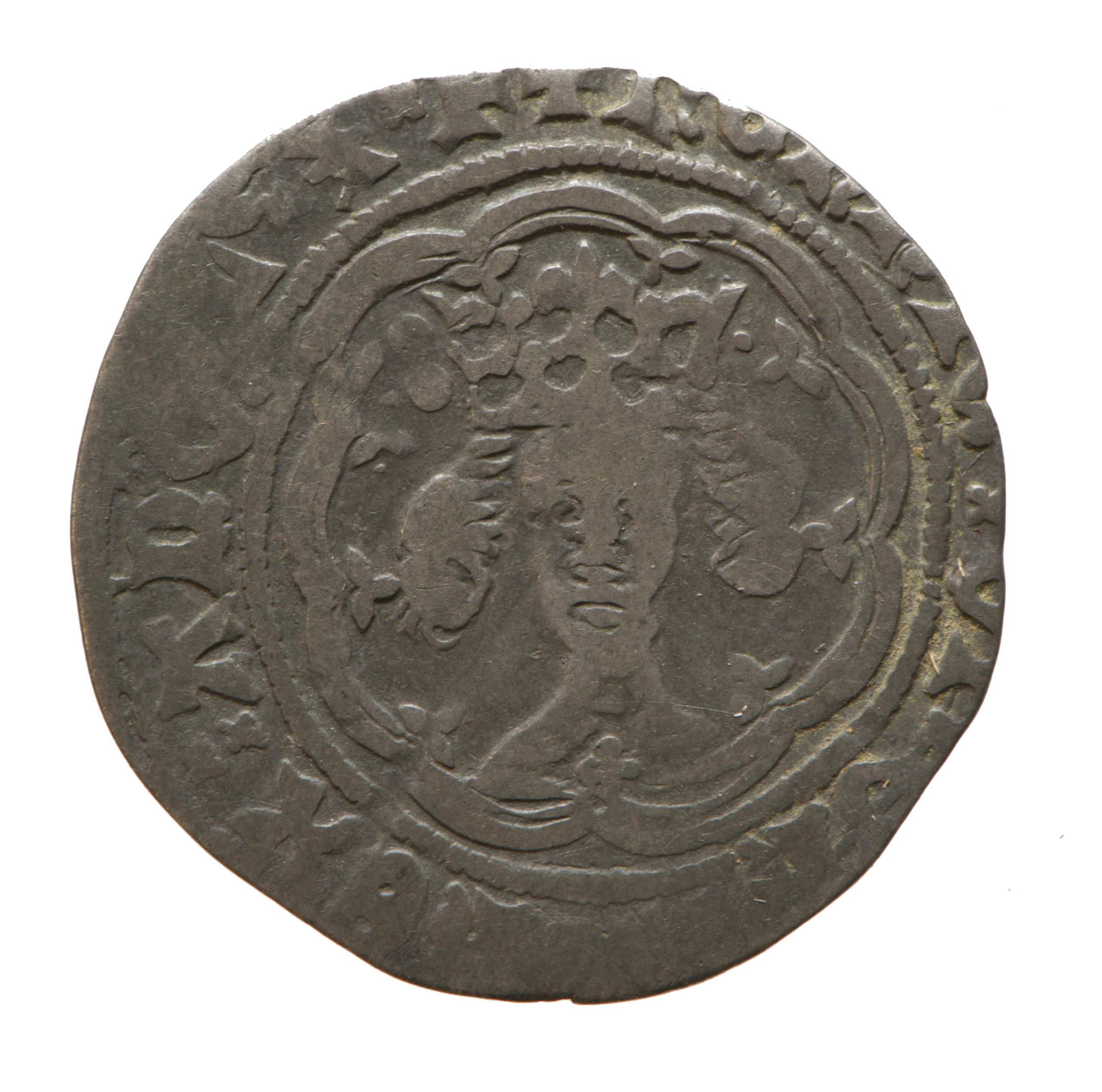
Silver half-groat of Henry IV, York Museums Trust

Henry consulted with Parliament frequently, but was sometimes at odds with the members, especially over ecclesiastical matters. In January 1401, Arundel convened a convocation at St. Paul's Cathedral to address Lollardy. Henry dispatched a group to implore the clergy to address the heresies that were causing turmoil in England and confusion among Christians, and to impose penalties on those responsible. A short time later the convocation along with the House of Commons petitioned Henry to take action against the Lollards. On this advice, Henry obtained from Parliament the enactment of De heretico comburendo in 1401, which prescribed the burning of heretics, an act done mainly to suppress the Lollard movement. In 1404 and 1410, Parliament suggested confiscating church land, in which both attempts failed to gain support.

=== Rebellions ===
Henry spent much of his reign defending himself against plots, rebellions, and assassination attempts. Henry's first major problem as monarch was what to do with the deposed Richard. After the early assassination plot was foiled in January 1400, Richard died in prison aged 33, probably of starvation on Henry's order. (Note: "Suggestive evidence that Richard's murder was carefully planned is contained among the exchequer payments. 'To William Loveney, Clerk of the Great Wardrobe, sent to Pontefract Castle on secret business by order of the King (Henry IV).'") Some chroniclers claimed that the despondent Richard had starved himself, which would not have been out of place with what is known of Richard's character. Though council records indicate that provisions were made for the transportation of the deposed king's body as early as 17 February, there is no reason to believe that he did not die on 14 February, as several chronicles stated. It can be positively said that he did not suffer a violent death, for his skeleton, upon examination, bore no signs of violence; whether he did indeed starve himself or whether that starvation was forced upon him are matters for lively historical speculation.

After his death, Richard's body was put on public display in St Paul's Cathedral, both to prove to his supporters that he was truly dead and also to prove that he had not suffered a violent death. This did not stop rumours from circulating for years after that he was still alive and waiting to take back his throne, and that the body displayed was that of Richard's chaplain, a priest named Maudelain, who greatly resembled him. Henry had the body discreetly buried in the Dominican Priory at Kings Langley, Hertfordshire, where it remained until King Henry V brought the body back to London and buried it in the tomb that Richard had commissioned for himself in Westminster Abbey.

Rebellions continued throughout the first 10 years of Henry's reign, including the revolt of Owain Glyndŵr, who declared himself Prince of Wales in 1400, and the rebellions led by Henry Percy, 1st Earl of Northumberland, from 1403. The first Percy rebellion ended in the Battle of Shrewsbury in 1403 with the death of the earl's son Henry, a renowned military figure known as "Hotspur" for his speed in advance and readiness to attack. Also in this battle, Henry IV's eldest son, Henry of Monmouth, later King Henry V, was wounded by an arrow in his face. He was cared for by royal physician John Bradmore. Despite this, the Battle of Shrewsbury was a royalist victory. Monmouth's military ability contributed to the king's victory (though Monmouth seized much effective power from his father in 1410).

In the last year of Henry's reign, the rebellions picked up speed. "The old fable of a living Richard was revived", notes one account, "and emissaries from Scotland traversed the villages of England, in the last year of Henry's reign, declaring that Richard was residing at the Scottish Court, awaiting only a signal from his friends to repair to London and recover his throne."

A suitable-looking impostor was found and King Richard's old groom circulated word in the city that his master was alive in Scotland. "Southwark was incited to insurrection" by Sir Elias Lyvet (Levett) and his associate Thomas Clark, who promised Scottish aid in carrying out the insurrection. Ultimately, the rebellion came to nought. Lyvet was released and Clark thrown into the Tower of London.

=== Foreign relations ===
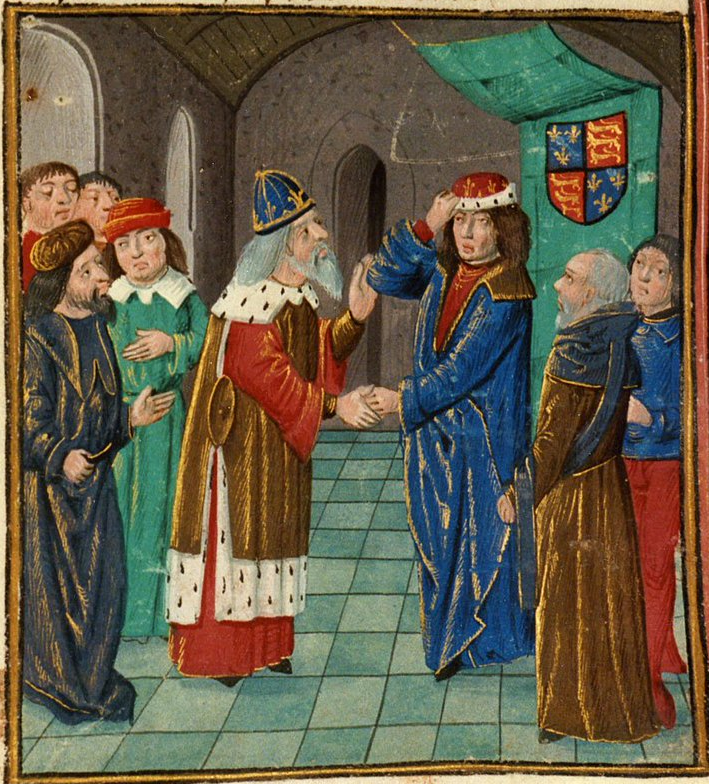
Manuel II Palaiologos (left) with Henry IV (right) in London, December 1400

Early in his reign, Henry hosted the visit of Manuel II Palaiologos, the only Byzantine emperor ever to visit England, from December 1400 to February 1401 at Eltham Palace, with a joust being given in his honour. Henry also sent monetary support with Manuel upon his departure to aid him against the Ottoman Empire.

In 1406, English pirates captured the future James I of Scotland, aged eleven, off the coast of Flamborough Head as he was sailing to France. James was delivered to Henry IV and remained a prisoner until after the death of Henry's son, Henry V.

=== Final illness and death ===
The later years of Henry's reign were marked by serious health problems. He had a disfiguring skin disease and, more seriously, suffered acute attacks of a grave illness in June 1405; April 1406; June 1408; during the winter of 1408–09; December 1412; and finally a fatal bout in March 1413. In 1410, Henry had provided his royal surgeon Thomas Morstede with an annuity of £40 p.a. which was confirmed by Henry V immediately after his succession. This was so that Morstede would "not be retained by anyone else". Medical historians have long debated the nature of this affliction or afflictions. The skin disease might have been leprosy (which did not necessarily mean precisely the same thing in the 15th century as it does to modern medicine), perhaps psoriasis, or a different disease. The acute attacks have been given a wide range of explanations, from epilepsy to a form of cardiovascular disease. Some medieval writers felt that he was struck with leprosy as a punishment for his treatment of Richard le Scrope, Archbishop of York, who was executed in June 1405 on Henry's orders after a failed coup.

According to Holinshed, it was predicted that Henry would die in Jerusalem, and Shakespeare's play repeats this prophecy. Henry took this to mean that he would die on crusade. In reality, he died in the Jerusalem Chamber in the abbot's house of Westminster Abbey, on 20 March 1413 during a convocation of Parliament. His executor, Thomas Langley, was at his side.

==== Burial ====
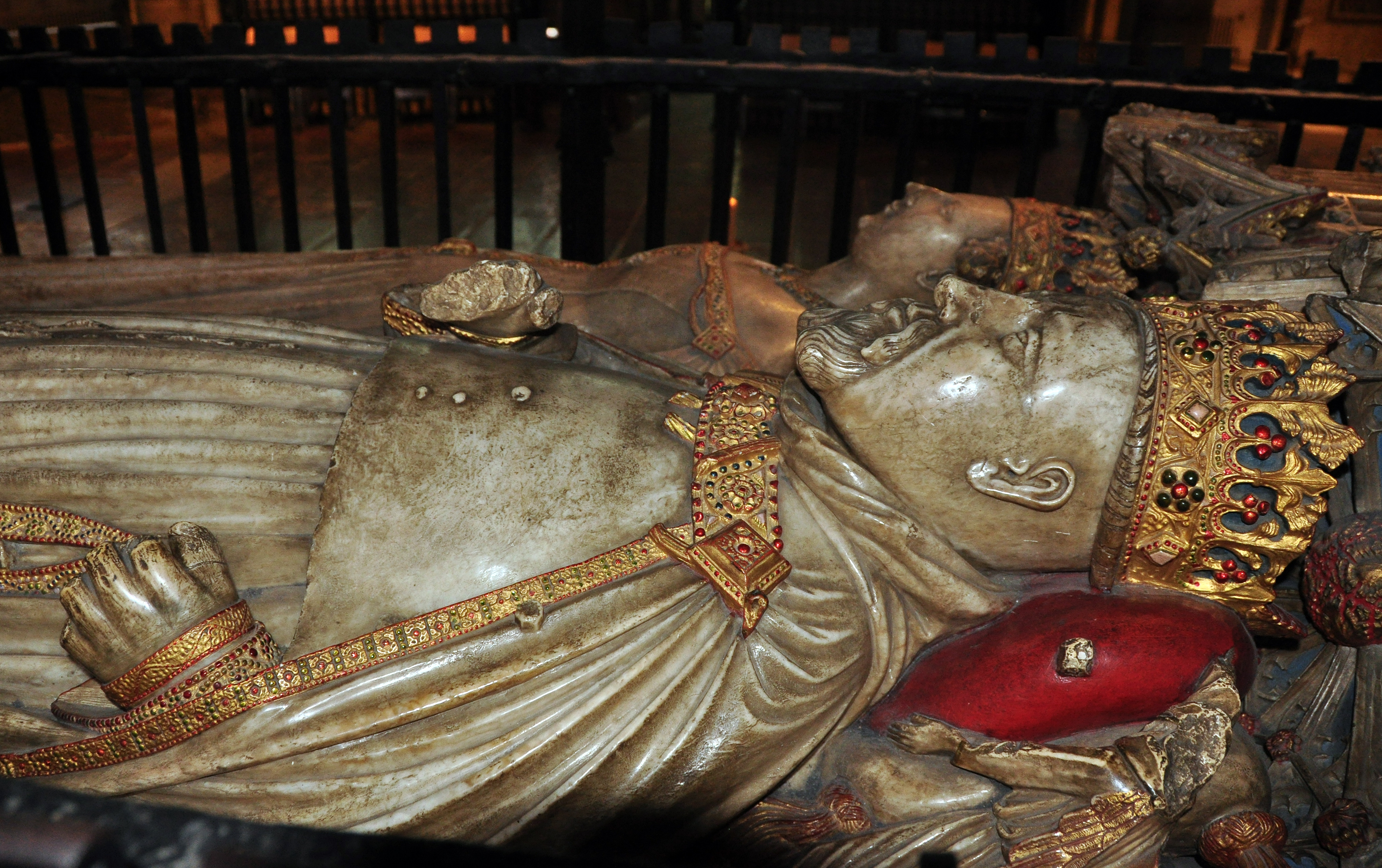
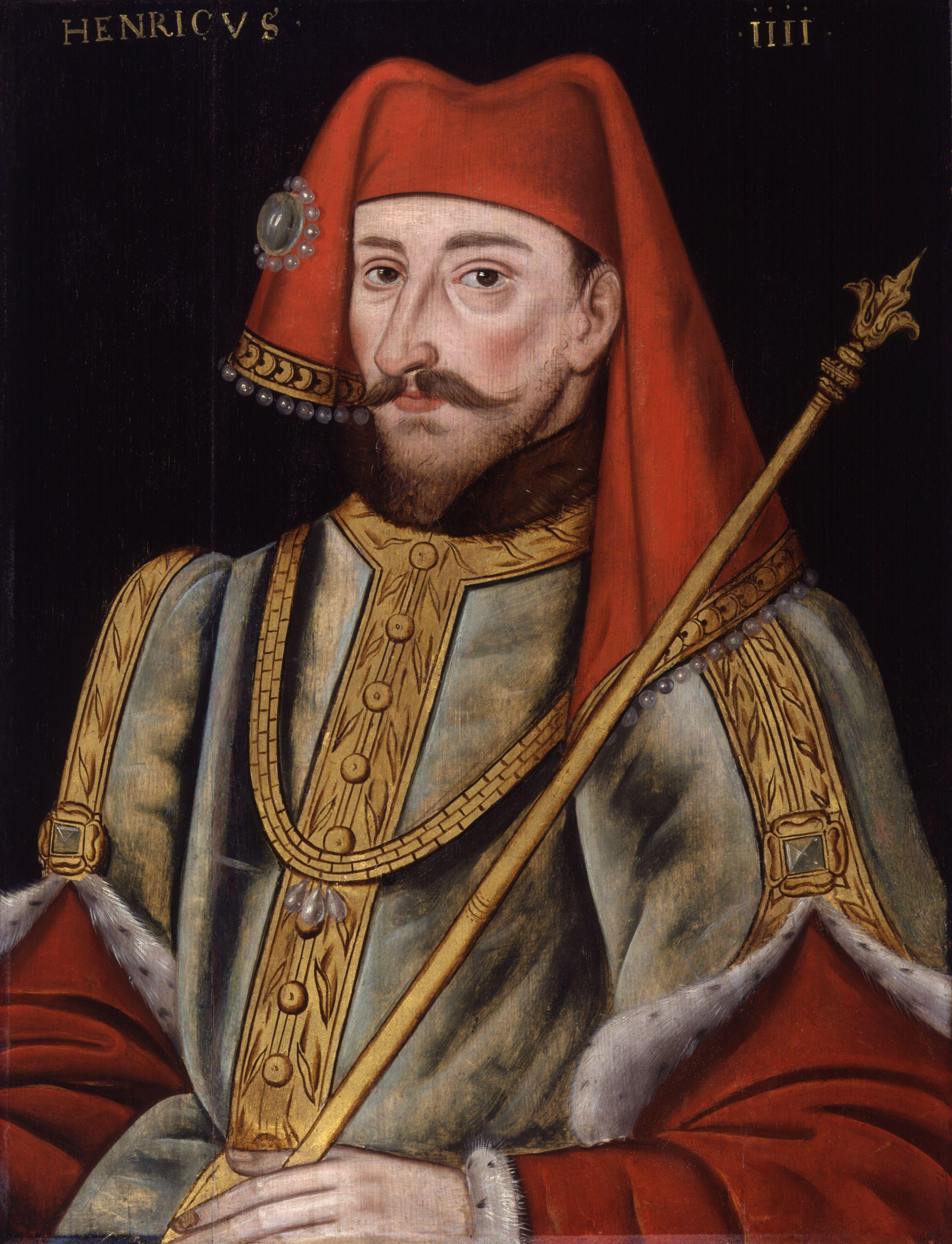
Henry IV and Joan of Navarre, detail of their effigies in Canterbury Cathedral (left) 16th-century imaginary painting of Henry IV, National Portrait Gallery, London (right)

Despite the example set by most of his recent predecessors, Henry and his second wife, Joan, were not buried at Westminster Abbey but at Canterbury Cathedral, on the north side of Trinity Chapel and directly adjacent to the shrine of St Thomas Becket. Becket's cult was then still thriving, as evidenced in the monastic accounts and in literary works such as The Canterbury Tales, and Henry seemed particularly devoted to it, or at least keen to be associated with it. The reasons for his interment in Canterbury are debatable, but it is highly likely that Henry deliberately associated himself with the martyr saint for reasons of political expediency, namely, the legitimisation of his dynasty after seizing the throne from Richard II. Significantly, at his coronation, he was anointed with holy oil that had reportedly been given to Becket by the Virgin Mary shortly before his death in 1170; this oil was placed inside a distinct eagle-shaped container of gold. According to one version of the tale, the oil had then passed to Henry's maternal grandfather, Henry of Grosmont, Duke of Lancaster.

Proof of Henry's deliberate connection to Becket lies partially in the structure of the tomb itself. The wooden panel at the western end of his tomb bears a painting of the martyrdom of Becket, and the tester, or wooden canopy, above the tomb is painted with Henry's personal motto, 'Soverayne', alternated by crowned golden eagles. Likewise, the three large coats of arms that dominate the tester painting are surrounded by collars of SS, a golden eagle enclosed in each tiret. The presence of such eagle motifs points directly to Henry's coronation oil and his ideological association with Becket. Sometime after Henry's death, an imposing tomb was built for him and his queen, probably commissioned and paid for by Queen Joan herself. Atop the tomb chest lie detailed alabaster effigies of Henry and Joan, crowned and dressed in their ceremonial robes. Henry's body was evidently well embalmed, as an exhumation in 1832 established, allowing historians to state with reasonable certainty that the effigies do represent accurate portraiture.

== Titles and arms ==
=== Titles ===
- Styled Earl of Derby (1377–1397);
- Earl of Northampton and Hereford (22 December 1384 – 30 September 1399);
- Duke of Hereford (29 September 1397 – 30 September 1399);
- Duke of Lancaster (3 February – 30 September 1399);
- King of England and Lord of Ireland (30 September 1399 – 20 March 1413).

Duke of Hereford was a title in the Peerage of England. It was created in 1397 for Richard II's cousin, Henry Bolingbroke, due to his support for the King in his struggle against their uncle Thomas of Woodstock, 1st Duke of Gloucester. As such it was a duketti ("little dukes") title. It merged in the crown on Henry's usurpation two years later, and has never since been recreated.

=== Arms ===
Before his father's death in 1399, Henry bore the arms of the kingdom, differenced by a label of five points ermine. After his father's death, the difference changed to a label of five points per pale ermine and France.

Coats of arms of Henry IV of England

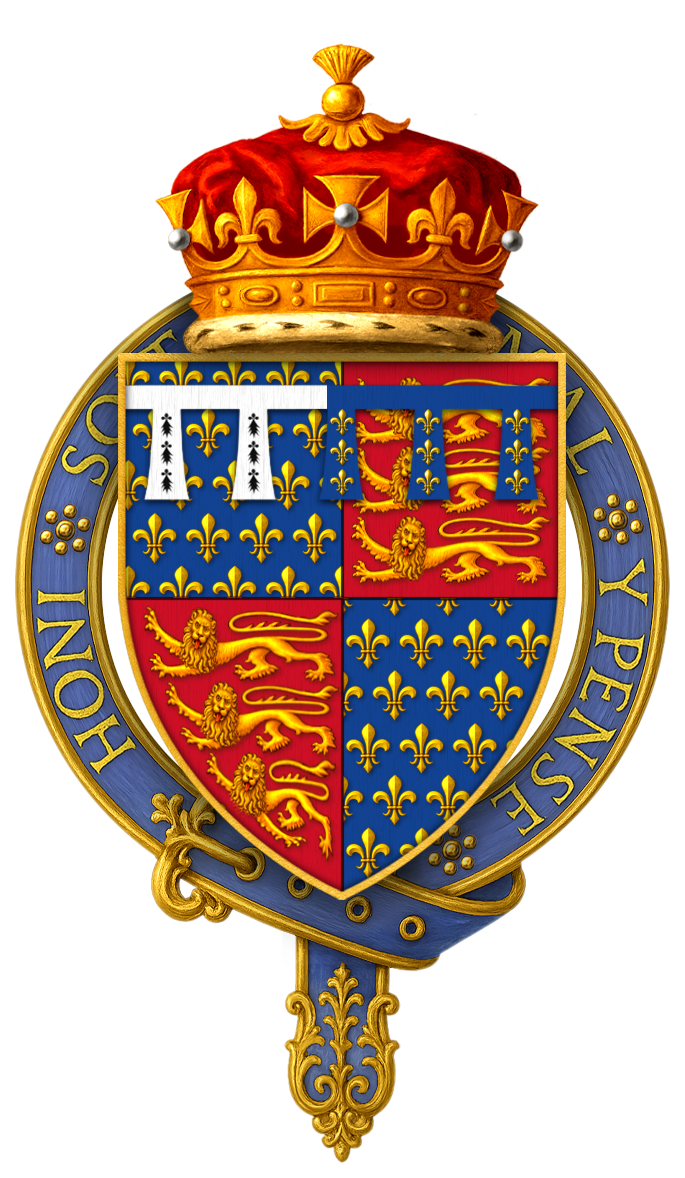
Coat of arms as 3rd Earl of Derby, KG.

Coat of arms as Duke of Hereford, KG.

Coat of arms as Duke of Hereford and Lancaster, KG.

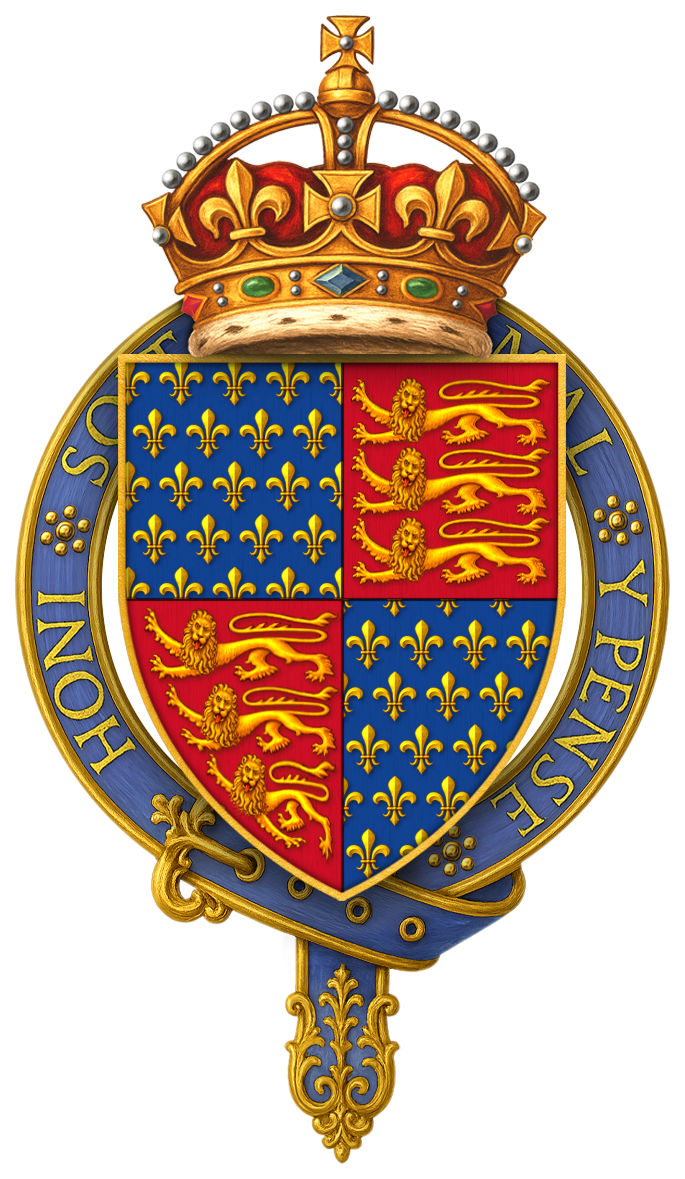
Coat of arms as king, KG.

Henry's achievement as king with the old arms of France.

Royal achievement as king updated to match an update in those of France from a field of fleur-de-lys to just three.

== Genealogy ==
Ancestors of Henry IV of England

8. Edward II of England
4. Edward III of England
9. Isabella of France
2. John of Gaunt, Duke of Lancaster
10. William I, Count of Hainaut
5. Philippa of Hainaut
11. Joan of Valois
1. Henry IV of England
12. Henry, 3rd Earl of Lancaster
6. Henry of Grosmont, Duke of Lancaster
13. Maud Chaworth
3. Blanche of Lancaster
14. Henry de Beaumont, 4th Earl of Buchan
7. Isabel of Beaumont
15. Alice Comyn, 4th Countess of Buchan

English royal families in the Wars of the Roses

Dukes (except Aquitaine) and Princes of Wales are noted, as are the monarchs' reigns.
†=Killed in action; =Executed
See also Family tree of English monarchs

Henry of Grosmont; Duke of Lancaster	Edward III; King of England r. 1327–1377
Edward of Woodstock "The Black Prince"; Prince of Wales	Thomas of Woodstock; Duke of Gloucester	Blanche of Lancaster	John of Gaunt; Duke of Lancaster	Katherine Swynford	Edmund of Langley; Duke of York	Lionel of Antwerp; Duke of Clarence
Edward of Angoulême	Richard II; Prince of Wales, King of England r. 1377–1399	Henry IV; Duke of Lancaster, King of England r. 1399–1413	John Beaufort	Thomas Beaufort; Duke of Exeter	Joan Beaufort	Ralph Neville	Philippa of Clarence
Owen Tudor; Lancastrian	Catherine of Valois	Henry V Duke of Lancaster, Prince of Wales, King of England r. 1413–1422	Humphrey; Duke of Gloucester	Henry Percy "Hotspur"	Elizabeth Mortimer	Roger Mortimer
Edward of Norwich; Duke of York	Richard of Conisburgh	Anne de Mortimer
John Beaufort; Duke of Somerset; Lancastrian	Margaret of Anjou; Lancastrian	Henry VI; King of England r. 1422–1461, r. 1470–1471; Lancastrian	Edmund Beaufort; Duke of Somerset; Lancastrian †1st St Albans	William Neville; Yorkist	Anne Neville	Henry Percy; Lancastrian †1st St Albans	Eleanor Neville	Richard Neville; Yorkist; (executed) Wakefield	Cecily Neville	Richard of York; Duke of York, Prince of Wales; Yorkist †Wakefield
Henry Beaufort; Duke of Somerset; Lancastrian; (executed) Hexham	Richard Woodville; (executed) Edgecote	Edmund Beaufort; Duke of Somerset; Lancastrian; (executed) Tewkesbury	Margaret Beaufort	Humphrey Stafford	Henry Percy; Lancastrian †Towton	John Neville; Yorkist, then Lancastrian †Barnet	Richard Neville "Kingmaker"; Yorkist, then Lancastrian †Barnet
Margaret Beaufort; Lancastrian	Edmund Tudor; Lancastrian	Jasper Tudor; Duke of Bedford; Lancastrian	Catherine Woodville	Henry Stafford; Duke of Buckingham; Yorkist, then Lancastrian (executed)	Elizabeth Woodville	Edward IV; Duke of York, King of England r. 1461–1470, r. 1471–1483; Yorkist	George Plantagenet; Duke of Clarence; Yorkist, then Lancastrian; (executed) Tower	Edward of Westminster; Prince of Wales; Lancastrian †Tewkesbury	Anne Neville	Richard III; Duke of Gloucester, King of England r. 1483–1485; Yorkist †Bosworth Field
Henry VII; King of England; Lancastrian r. 1485–1509	Elizabeth of York	Edward V Prince of Wales, King of England r. 1483; Yorkist; (executed) Tower	Richard of Shrewsbury; Duke of York; (executed) Tower

== Marriages and issue ==
=== First marriage: Mary de Bohun ===
Henry married Mary de Bohun at an unknown date, but her marriage licence, purchased by Henry's father John of Gaunt in June 1380, is preserved at the National Archives. The accepted date of the ceremony is 5 February 1381, at Mary's family home of Rochford Hall, Essex. The near-contemporary chronicler Jean Froissart reports a rumour that Mary's sister Eleanor de Bohun kidnapped Mary from Pleshey Castle and held her at Arundel Castle, where she was kept as a novice nun; Eleanor's intention was to control Mary's half of the Bohun inheritance (or to allow her husband, Thomas, Duke of Gloucester, to control it). There Mary was persuaded to marry Henry. She died in 1394 and therefore never became queen after Henry claimed the English throne in 1399. They had six children: (Note: The idea that Henry and Mary had a child Edward who was born and died in April 1382 is based on a misreading of an account which was published in an erroneous form by J. H. Wylie in the 19th century. It missed a line which made clear that the boy in question was the son of Thomas of Woodstock. The attribution of the name Edward to this boy is conjecture based on the fact that Henry was the grandson of Edward III and idolised his uncle Edward of Woodstock yet did not call any of his sons Edward. However, there is no evidence that there was any child at this time (when Mary de Bohun was 12), let alone that he was called Edward. See appendix 2 in Ian Mortimer's book The Fears of Henry IV.)

Name	Arms	Blazon
Henry V of England (1386–1422), 1st son		Arms of King Henry IV: France modern quartering Plantagenet
Thomas, Duke of Clarence (1387–1421), 2nd son, who married Margaret Holland, widow of John Beaufort, 1st Earl of Somerset, and daughter of Thomas Holland, 2nd Earl of Kent, without progeny.		Arms of King Henry IV with a label of three points argent each charged with three ermine spots and a canton gules for difference
John, Duke of Bedford (1389–1435), 3rd son, who married twice: firstly to Anne of Burgundy (d. 1432), daughter of John the Fearless, without progeny. Secondly to Jacquetta of Luxembourg, without progeny.		Arms of King Henry IV with a label of five points per pale ermine and France for difference
Humphrey, Duke of Gloucester (1390–1447), 4th son, who married twice but left no surviving legitimate progeny: firstly to Jacqueline, Countess of Hainaut and Holland (d.1436), daughter of William VI, Count of Hainaut. Through this marriage Gloucester assumed the title "Count of Holland, Zeeland and Hainault". Secondly to Eleanor Cobham, his mistress.		Arms of King Henry IV with bordure argent for difference
Blanche of England (1392–1409) married in 1402 Louis III, Elector Palatine		
Philippa of England (1394–1430) married in 1406 Eric of Pomerania, king of Denmark, Norway and Sweden.		

Henry had four sons from his first marriage, which was undoubtedly a clinching factor in his acceptability for the throne. By contrast, Richard II had no children and Richard's heir-presumptive Edmund Mortimer was only seven years old. The only two of Henry's six children who produced legitimate children to survive to adulthood were Henry V and Blanche, whose son, Rupert, was the heir to the Electorate of the Palatinate until his death at 20. All three of his other sons produced illegitimate children. Henry IV's male Lancaster line ended in 1471 during the War of the Roses, between the Lancastrians and the Yorkists, with the deaths of his grandson Henry VI and Henry VI's son Edward, Prince of Wales. Mary de Bohun died giving birth to her daughter Philippa in 1394.

=== Second marriage: Joan of Navarre ===
On 7 February 1403, nine years after the death of his first wife, Henry married Joan, the daughter of Charles II of Navarre, at Winchester. She was the widow of John IV, Duke of Brittany (known in traditional English sources as John V), with whom she had 9 children; however, her marriage to King Henry produced no surviving children. In 1403, Joan of Navarre gave birth to stillborn twins fathered by King Henry IV, which was the last pregnancy of her life. Joan was 35 years old at the time.

=== Mistresses ===
By an unknown mistress, Henry IV had one illegitimate child:

- Edmund Leborde (1401 – shortly before 19 December 1419)

== See also ==
- Cultural depictions of Henry IV of England
- Naish Priory in Somerset contains corbelled heads of Henry IV and Joanna celebrating their marriage, at the manor of Mary de Bohun's late and powerful great-aunt, Margaret de Bohun
- List of earls in the reign of Henry IV of England
- Mouldwarp

== Notes ==
Henry IV of England House of Lancaster Cadet branch of the House of Plantagenet Born: c. April 1367 Died: 20 March 1413
Regnal titles
Preceded by Richard II	King of England; Lord of Ireland; 1399–1413	Succeeded by Henry V
Preceded by Richard II	Duke of Aquitaine; 1399–1400	Succeeded by Henry V
Peerage of England
Preceded by John of Gaunt	Duke of Lancaster; 1399	Succeeded by Henry of Monmouth
In abeyance Title last held by Humphrey de Bohun	Earl of Northampton; 1384–1399	Succeeded by Anne of Gloucester
Political offices
Preceded by The Duke of Lancaster	Lord High Steward; 1399	Succeeded by The Duke of Clarence
