= John Bradmore =

English surgeon (d. 1412)

John Bradmore (died January 1412) was an English surgeon, metalworker, and court physician during the reign of King Henry IV of England. He is best known for extracting an arrow embedded in the skull of the king's son, the future king Henry V at Kenilworth, after the Battle of Shrewsbury in 1403. He compiled an early surgical treatise, which he entitled Philomena.

== Life and career ==
Bradmore was a successful surgeon living in London as early as 1377. He seems to have been a prosperous and respected member of his community, acquiring multiple properties and helping to found a parish fraternity. He married twice and had two children. John Bradmore's brother, Nicholas Bradmore, also practiced surgery in London. His daughter Agnes married another surgeon, John Longe. This suggests the Bradmores may have come from a family of surgeons.

In 1386 a charge of counterfeiting or “false coining” was brought against both John and his brother Nicholas, but they were pardoned by King Richard II in the same year. Bradmore was probably a skilled metalworker, as he is also referred to as a "gemestre" (gemster), which may mean he made jewellery. Historian Faye Getz states, "Surgeons especially seem to have engaged in metalworking as a trade, probably making surgical instruments for themselves and for sale purposes."

Sometime before 1399 Bradmore became associated with the court of Henry IV. In that year, he successfully treated the master of the king’s pavilions, William Wyncelowe, who had sustained an extensive abdominal wound while attempting suicide. In 1403 and 1406 he received payments from the crown for “fees and robes” and also received an annuity of 10 marks from the prince of Wales, perhaps due to his successful treatment of the prince at Kenilworth. In 1408 he was appointed to the post of searcher of the port of London.

Between 1403 and his death in 1412, Bradmore wrote a lengthy treatise on surgery which he titled Philomena. The treatise compiles information from multiple sources, as well as descriptions of treatments Bradmore himself oversaw, such as the arrow extraction of Henry V. Philomena exists as a Latin manuscript (BL, Sloane MS 2272) likely written by Bradmore himself, and a later Middle English translation (BL, Harley MS 173) created after his death. These manuscripts were later mistakenly attributed to surgeon Thomas Morstede.

Bradmore died on 27 January 1412 and was buried in the church of St. Botolph. A monument commemorating him and both his wives was destroyed by the Great Fire of London in 1666.

== Arrowhead extraction ==
Bradmore attended the prince at Kenilworth, where the wounded Henry had been taken after the battle of Shrewsbury. An arrow penetrated on the right side below the eye and beside the nose of the young prince. When surgeons tried to remove the arrow, the shaft broke, leaving the bodkin point embedded in his skull some five to six inches deep, narrowly missing the brain stem and surrounding arteries. Several other physicians had already been called on to resolve the problem but were unable to help. Bradmore's successor as royal surgeon, Thomas Morstede, later called them "lewd chattering leeches".

Bradmore instructed honey to be poured into the wound and invented an instrument for extraction. Two threaded tongs held a centre threaded shaft, which could be inserted into the wound: the shape was not unlike a tapered threaded rod inside a split cylinder. Once the end of the tongs was located within the skirt of the arrowhead, the threaded rod was turned to open the tongs within the bodkin socket, locking it into place, and it, along with the device, could be extracted. The instrument was quickly made by Bradmore or a blacksmith to Bradmore's specifications. Bradmore himself guided it into the wound to extract the arrowhead successfully. The wound was then filled with alcohol (wine) to cleanse it.
