= Siege of Vilnius (1390) =

1390 siege by the forces of Grand Duke Vytautas

- Part of the Lithuanian Civil War (1389–1392)
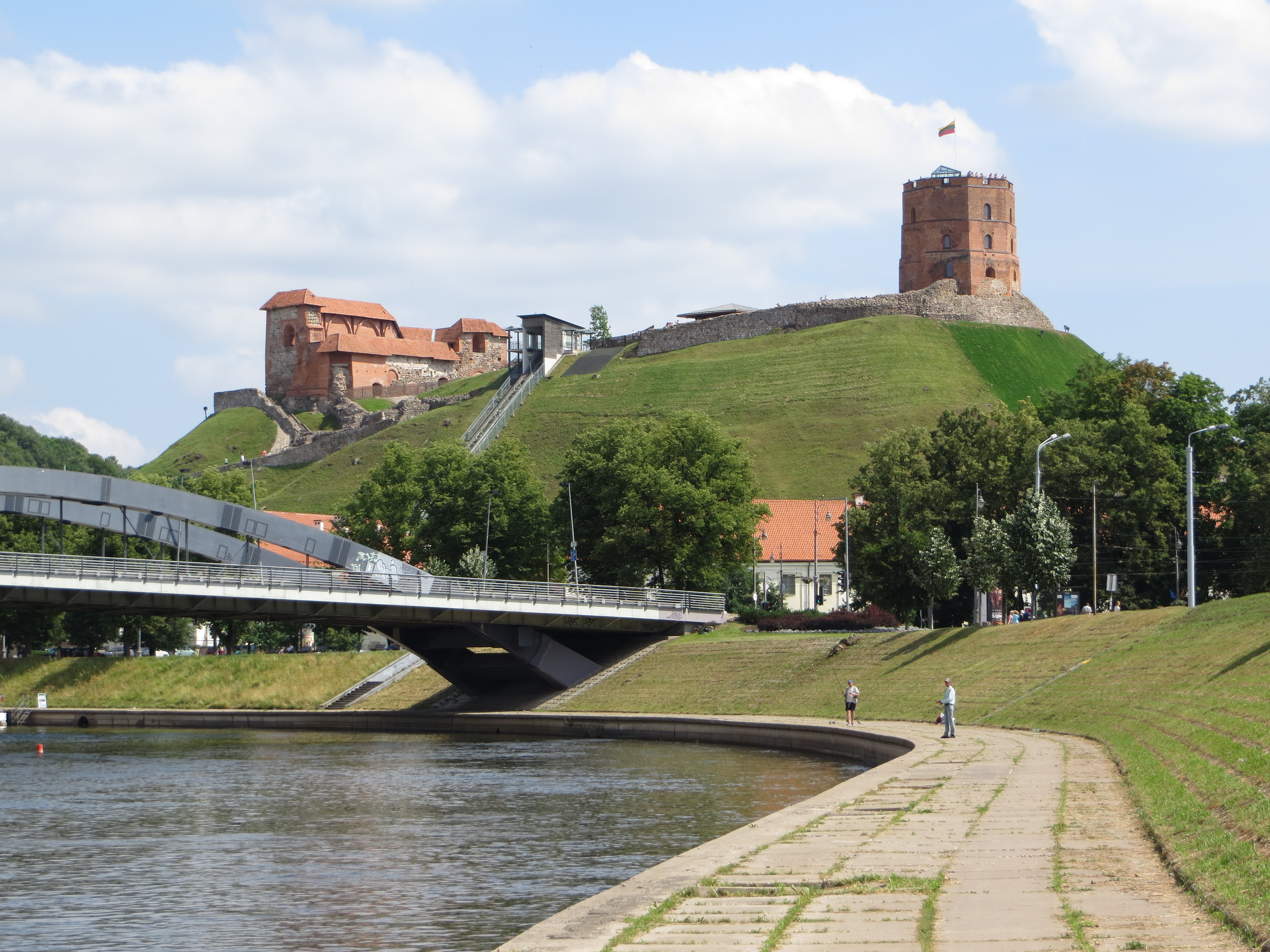
- Upper Castle remains
Date	11 September – 7 October 1390
Location	Vilnius
Result	Lithuanian victory

Belligerents
Teutonic Order	Grand Duchy of Lithuania; Crown of the Kingdom of Poland

Commanders and leaders
Konrad von Wallenrode; Vytautas the Great; Tautvilas Kęstutaitis †; Henry Bolingbroke	Skirgaila; Karigaila †; Klemens Moskarzewski; Jaska of Oleśnica

Strength
Unknown	Unknown

Casualties and losses
Unknown	~1,000 city folk

The siege of Vilnius occurred in 1390 from 11 September to 7 October. The forces of Grand Duke Vytautas, assisted by the Teutonic Order, besieged Vilnius which was defended by Polish, Lithuanian, and Ruthenian forces under Skirgaila's command. The besiegers managed to destroy the Crooked Castle, which was never rebuilt. However, after almost five weeks of battle, the invading forces decided to retreat due to the poor incoming weather and supply concerns.

== Background ==
After Vytautas's attempt to depose the unpopular Grand Duke Skirgaila failed, he allied with Lithuania's long-term enemy, the Teutonic Order. The coalition organized several small campaigns in Lithuania, including at Kernavė and Jurbarkas. Henry Bolingbroke, the future king of England (Henry IV), also campaigned in the war with 70 or 80 household knights.

At Jurbarkas, the Teutonic Grandmaster Konrad Zöllner von Rotenstein died; the coalition decided to abandon the siege and march on Vilnius instead. One contingent of the army was led by Vytautas and a marshal of the Teutonic Order, and the other contingent, made up of Livonian Order troops, was led by the new Grandmaster Konrad von Wallenrode. After crossing the Nemunas River near Kaunas, the coalition defeated a retreating unit led by Skirgaila.

Skirgaila's forces, then the garrison of the Trakai Island Castle, retreated to Vilnius. The coalition reached Vilnius on 4 September. According to Johann von Posilge, the Teutonic marshal reached Vilnius by boat. According to Jan Długosz, the defense of the Vilnius Castle Complex was entrusted to a Polish garrison led by Klemens Moskarzewski, sent by Jogaila. The defenders urgently assembled new fortifications. According to Długosz, the starost of Lithuania Jaska of Oleśnica burned the city and ordered for barriers to be built out of tree stumps. According to Albert Wijuk Kojałowicz, he also called for the city folk to shut themselves in the Lower Castle. Wigand of Marburg notes that the Teutonic Order brought food with them in carts instead of pillaging the countryside, probably hoping to secure the favor of the local population for Vytautas.

== Siege ==
=== Crooked Castle ===
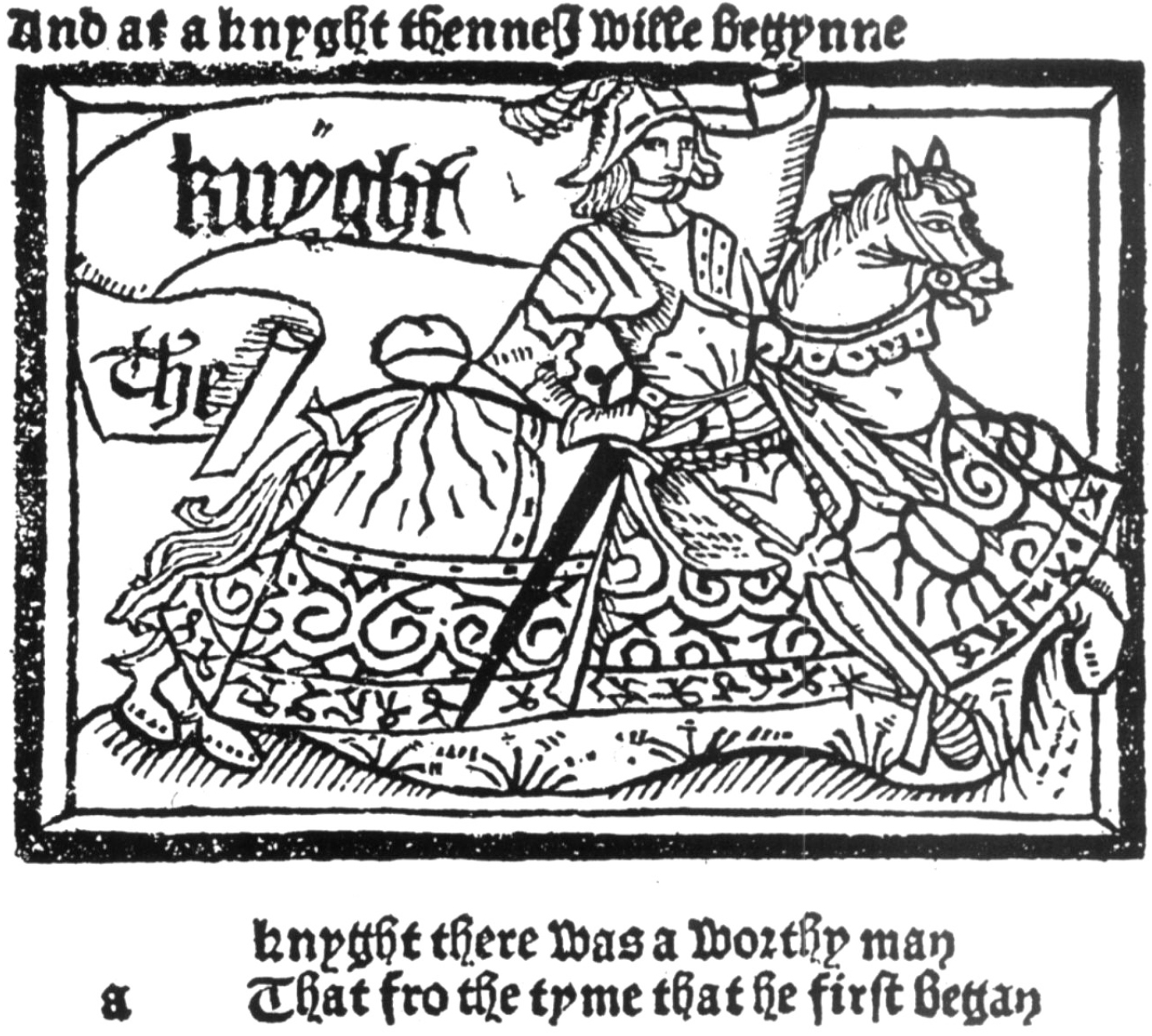
Portrait of an English Knight, from the General Prologue of The Canterbury Tales. The fictional knight took part in many crusades, including one against the Lithuanians.

The Crooked Castle was taken on 16 September. Taking that part of the castle was likely the result of either a betrayal within the defenders or panic during a fire. Archaeological findings confirm that a large fire occurred in the Crooked Castle. One thousand city folk died and two thousand were taken as prisoners. Among the deceased were Jogaila's brother Karigaila. The besiegers carried Karigaila's head on a stake and carried it around the Lower Castle, trying to intimidate the defenders and force a surrender. To alleviate some difficulties, the besiegers built a bridge across the Neris. Both sides used crossbows; it is believed that one of the besiegers, Tautvilas Kęstutaitis, son of Kęstutis, was killed by a crossbow arrow.

The Teutonic Order also used artillery, as confirmed by Henry Bolingbroke's account book, where "66 shillings and 8 pence were paid to various miners working on a certain siege engine near Vilnius", and "6 shillings and 8 pence were paid to various engineers near the Vilnius Castle." Another account also notes that a Sir Bourser was paid 4 shillings for being the first to take the flag from the Vilnius city wall.

=== Higher and Lower Castles ===
Although the attack on the Crooked Castle was successful, attacks on the Lower and Higher Castles were marked by difficulties. Johann von Posilge once again notes that "the other castles were well supplied with flying firearms and crossbows, and in such a hostile manner that the soldiers besieging them, short of two days, for five weeks, weren't able to able to conquer any of them." The attackers managed to burn down the gates of the Lower Castle and partially destroy the Higher Castle tower, however, the defenders were able to quickly fill the breaches with dung and dirt.

=== Retreat ===
During the siege, trade continued between the attackers and defenders; food was brought to the Teutonic soldiers by Vytautas's army. However, as the coalition feared suffering heavy losses and depleting supplies, as well as the deterioration of the roads due to the approaching autumn, they decided to retreat. Grandmaster Konrad von Wallenrode, in a letter to the Holy Roman Emperor Wenceslaus IV, notes that the retreat was due to the increasing bad weather.

== Bibliography ==
- Długosz, Jan (1961). Roczniki, czyli kroniki słynnego Królestwa Polskiego (in Polish). Warsaw.
- Ragauskienė, Raimonda (2006). Vilniaus Žemutinė pilis XIV a.–XIX a. pradžioje: 2002–2004 m. istorinių šaltinių paieškos (in Lithuanian). Vilnius. ISBN 9986907144.
- Vijūkas-Kojelavičius, Albertas (1988). Lietuvos istorija (in Lithuanian). ISBN 9785415005512.
- Marburgietis, Vygandas (1999). Naujoji Prūsijos kronika (in Lithuanian). Vaga. ISBN 9785415004898.
- Vitkūnas, Manvydas. Vilnius kovose su kryžiuočiais XIV a. antrojoje pusėje (in Lithuanian). General Jonas Žemaitis Military Academy of Lithuania.
- Jurginis, Juozas (1964). Lietuvių karas su kryžiuočiais (in Lithuanian). Mintis.
